= List of University of Oxford people in religion =

This is a list of University of Oxford people in religion. Many were students at one (or more) of the colleges of the university, and others held fellowships at a college.

This list forms part of a series of lists of people associated with the University of Oxford – for other lists, please see the main article List of University of Oxford people.

== Christianity ==
=== Saints ===
- John Boste (The Queen's)
- Alexander Briant (Hart Hall)
- Edmund Campion (St John's)
- Thomas of Hereford (Chancellor)
- Richard of Chichester (Chancellor)
- Richard Gwyn
- Cuthbert Mayne (St John's)
- Thomas More (Canterbury Hall)
- John Henry Newman (Trinity)
- Edmund of Abingdon (Grammar, Arts, Theology)
- John Roberts (St John's)
- Ralph Sherwin (Exeter)
- Simon Stock (college or hall not known)

=== Blessed ===
- Thomas Abel (college or hall not known)
- Thomas Cottam (Brasenose)
- Thomas Ford (Trinity)
- John Forrest (c. 1500, BD, possibly DD)
- John Ingram (New College)
- Edward James (St John's)
- George Nichols (Brasenose)
- John Duns Scotus (college or hall not known)
- John Shert (Brasenose)
- John Story (Broadgates Hall)

=== Antipope ===
- Antipope Alexander V antipope 1409-10

=== Cardinals ===
Excluding Cardinals who were Archbishop of Canterbury or York

- William Allen (Oriel and St Mary Hall) Cardinal 1587
- Joseph Cordeiro Archbishop of Karachi, Pakistan and Cardinal 1973-1994
- William Heard (Balliol) Dean of the Sacred Roman Rota 1958, Cardinal 1959
- Basil Hume (St Benet's Hall) archbishop of Westminster and Cardinal 1976–99
- Henry Manning (Balliol) archbishop of Westminster 1865-92 and Cardinal 1875-92
- John Henry Newman (Trinity) Cardinal 1879
- George Pell (Campion Hall) archbishop of Melbourne 1996–2001, archbishop of Sydney 2001–14, Cardinal 2003-23
- Timothy Radcliffe (St John's) Master of the Order of Preachers (i.e., head of the worldwide Dominican Order) 1992–2001, Cardinal from 2024
- Philip Repyngdon bishop of Lincoln 1404–19, Cardinal 1408-24

=== Archbishops of Canterbury ===
- Edmund Rich 1233-40
- John Peckham 1279-92
- Robert Winchelsey 1294-1313
- John de Stratford 1333-48 (Merton)
- Thomas Bradwardine 1349-49 (Balliol)
- William Whittlesey 1368-74
- William Courtenay 1381-96 (Stapledon Hall)
- Thomas Arundel 1397–98, 1397-1414 (Oriel)
- Henry Chichele 1414-43 (New College and All Souls)
- John Kemp 1452-54 (Merton) Cardinal
- Thomas Bourchier 1454-86 Cardinal
- John Morton 1486-1500 (Balliol) Cardinal
- Thomas Langton 1501 (The Queen's)
- Henry Deane 1501-03 (Exeter)
- William Warham 1503-32 (New College)
- Reginald Pole 1557-58 (Magdalen and Corpus Christi) Cardinal
- George Abbot 1611-33 (Balliol and University)
- William Laud 1633-45 (St John's)
- William Juxon 1660-63 (St John's)
- Gilbert Sheldon 1663-77 (Trinity and All Souls)
- William Wake 1716-37 (Christ Church)
- John Potter 1737-47 (University, Lincoln, and Christ Church)
- Thomas Secker 1758-68 (Exeter)
- Charles Longley 1862-68 (Balliol)
- Archibald Tait 1868-82 (Balliol)
- Frederick Temple 1896-1902 (Balliol)
- Randall Davidson 1903-28 (Trinity)
- Cosmo Lang 1928-42 (Balliol)
- William Temple 1942-44 (Balliol)
- Geoffrey Fisher (later Baron Fisher of Lambeth) 1945-61 (Exeter)
- Robert Runcie (later Baron Runcie of Cuddesdon) 1980-91 (Brasenose)
- Rowan Williams (later Baron Williams of Oystermouth) 2002-12 (Christ Church and Wadham)

=== Archbishops of York ===
- Walter de Gray 1216–55
- William Greenfield 1306–15
- Thomas Arundel 1388–96 (Oriel)
- Richard le Scrope 1398–1405
- John Kemp 1426–52 (Merton) Cardinal
- George Neville 1465–76 (Balliol)
- Thomas Rotherham 1480–1500 (Lincoln)
- Christopher Bainbridge 1508–14 (The Queen's)
- Thomas Wolsey 1514–30 (Magdalen) Cardinal
- Thomas Young 1561–68
- Tobias Matthew 1606–28 (University, Christ Church, and St John's)
- Accepted Frewen 1660–64 (Magdalen)
- John Dolben 1683–86 (Christ Church)
- Lancelot Blackburne 1724-43 (Christ Church)
- William Markham 1776–1807 (Christ Church)
- Charles Thomas Longley 1860–62 (Balliol)
- William Thomson 1862–90 (The Queen's)
- Cosmo Lang 1909–28 (Balliol)
- William Temple 1929–42 (Balliol)
- Cyril Garbett 1942-55 (Keble)
- Stuart Blanch (later Baron Blanch) 1975–83 (St Catherine's)
- David Hope (later Baron Hope of Thornes) 1995-2005 (Linacre)

=== Other archbishops, presiding bishops, and metropolitans ===
- Hugh Boulter (Christ Church and Magdalen) bishop of Bristol 1719–24, archbishop of Armagh 1724-42
- A. G. Edwards (Jesus) bishop of St Asaph 1889–1934, archbishop of Wales 1920-34
- Richard FitzRalph (Balliol) archbishop of Armagh 1346-60
- Francis Oliver Green-Wilkinson (Magdalen) bishop of Lusaka 1951–70, archbishop of Central Africa 1962–70
- Frank Tracy Griswold (Oriel) presiding bishop, Episcopal Church in the United States of America 1997-2006
- David Hand (Oriel) consecrated bishop 1950, archbishop of Papua New Guinea 1977-83
- Trevor Huddleston (Christ Church) archbishop of the Indian Ocean and bishop of Mauritius 1978-83
- Peter Jensen archbishop of Sydney and metropolitan of New South Wales 2001-
- Narcissus Marsh (Exeter and St Alban Hall) archbp of Cashel 1691–94, archbishop of Dublin 1694–1703, archbishop of Armagh 1703-13
- David Moxon (St Peter's) bishop of Waikato 1993-, Archbishop of the New Zealand Dioceses and co-presiding Bishop of the Anglican Church in Aotearoa, New Zealand and the Pacific 2006-
- Edward Francis Paget (Christ Church) bishop of Mashonaland 1925–57, archbishop of Central Africa 1955-57
- Paul Alfred Reeves (St Peter's) bishop of Waiapu 1971–79, bishop of Auckland 1979–85, archbishop and primate of New Zealand 1980-85
- Glyn Simon (Jesus) bishop of Llandaff 1957–71, archbishop of Wales 1968–71
- George Stone (Christ Church) archbishop of Armagh 1747-64
- Timothy Ware (Kallistos) (Magdalen and Pembroke) Orthodox bishop of Diokleia 1982-, Metropolitan 2007-
- Gwilym Owen Williams (Jesus) bishop of Bangor 1957–82, archbishop of Wales 1971-82
- Daniel Wilson (St Edmund Hall) bishop of Calcutta and metropolitan of India and Ceylon 1832-58
- John Charles Wright archbishop of Sydney 1909–33, primate of Australia 1910-33

=== Other bishops ===
Post-Reformation bishops are Anglican unless described otherwise

Name	College	Years at Oxford	Notes	Ref
William Aubrey Aitken	Trinity		bishop of Lynn, 1972–86	
Gerald Burton Allen	Wadham (scholar and chaplain), Pembroke (fellow), St Edmund Hall (principal), Christ Church (canon)		bishop of Sherborne, 1928–36, archdeacon of Oxford and canon of Christ Church 1936–52, assistant bishop of Oxford 1936–39, bishop of Dorchester 1939–52	
Lancelot Andrewes	Jesus and Pembroke		bishop of Chichester 1605–09, bishop of Ely 1609–18, bishop of Winchester 1618–26	
John Armstrong	Lincoln		bishop of Grahamstown 1853–56	
Mervyn Armstrong	Balliol		bishop of Jarrow 1958-65	
Francis Atterbury	Christ Church		bishop of Rochester and dean of Westminster 1713–23	
Richard Aungerville (Richard de Bury)			bishop of Durham 1333–45, lord high treasurer 1334–35, lord high chancellor 1335–36	
William Awdry	Balliol and The Queen's		bishop of Southampton, 1895–96, bishop of Osaka 1896–98, bishop of South Tokyo 1898–1908	
Walter Hubert Baddeley	Keble		bishop of Melanesia 1932–47, bishop of Whitby 1947–54, bishop of Blackburn 1954–60	
Paul Everard Barber	St John's		bishop of Brixworth 1989–2001	
Cuthbert Bardsley	New College		bishop of Croydon 1947–56, bishop of Coventry 1956–76	
Thomas Barlow	The Queen's		bishop of Lincoln 1675–91	
Richard Barnes	Brasenose		bishop of Nottingham 1567–70, bishop of Carlisle 1570–77, bishop of Durham 1577-87	
Shute Barrington	Merton		bishop of Llandaff 1769–82, bishop of Salisbury 1782–91, bishop of Durham 1791–1826	
Timothy John Bavin	Worcester		bishop of Johannesburg 1974–84, bishop of Portsmouth 1984-95	
Thomas Beckington	New College		bishop of Bath and Wells 1434–65, Lord Privy Seal 1443-44	
James Harold Bell	St Peter's, Wycliffe Hall, Brasenose	Undergraduate 1972–74, Academic 1976-82	bishop of Knaresborough 2003-	
John Bell	Balliol		bishop of Worcester 1539–43	
Colin Bennetts	Jesus		bishop of Buckingham 1994–98, bishop of Coventry 1998–	
Harold Ernest Bilbrough	New College		bishop of Dover 1916–27, bishop of Newcastle 1927–41	
Edmund Bonner	Pembroke		bishop of London 1539–49, 1553–59	
Cecil Henry Boutflower	Christ Church		bishop of Dorking 1905–09, bishop of South Tokyo 1909–21, bishop of Southampton 1921–33	
Ian James Brackley	Keble		bishop of Dorking 1996-	
James Brooks	Corpus Christi and Balliol		bishop of Gloucester 1554–58	
Thomas Brunce	New College		bishop of Rochester 1435–37, bishop of Norwich 1437–45	
Colin Ogilvie Buchanan	Lincoln		bishop of Aston 1985–89, bishop of Woolwich 1996–2004	
John Buckeridge	St John's		bishop of Rochester 1611–28, bishop of Ely in 1628–31	
Thomas Burgess	Corpus Christi		bishop of St Davids 1803–25, bishop of Salisbury 1825–37	
Andrew Burnham	New College and St Stephen's House		bishop of Ebbsfleet 2000-10	
Leonard Hedley Burrows	New College		bishop of Lewes 1909–14, bishop of Sheffield 1914-39	
Joseph Butler	Oriel		bishop of Bristol 1738–50, bishop of Durham 1750–52	
Henry Montgomery Campbell	Brasenose		bishop of Willesden 1940–42, bishop of Kensington 1942–49, bishop of Guildford 1949–56, bishop of London 1956–61	
Harry James Carpenter	Keble		bishop of Oxford 1955-70	
Graham Charles Chadwick	Keble		bishop of Kimberley and Kuruman 1976-82	
William Frank Percival Chadwick	Wadham, Wycliffe Hall		bishop of Barking 1959–75	
Christopher Maude Chavasse	Trinity and St Peter's		bishop of Rochester 1940–60	
Richard Ian Cheetham	Corpus Christi		bishop of Kingston upon Thames 2002-	
Alan Chesters	St Catherine's and St Stephen's House		bishop of Blackburn 1989–2003	
David Chillingworth	Oriel		bishop of St Andrews, Dunkeld, and Dunblane 2005–	
George William Clarkson	New College		bishop of Pontefract 1949–54, dean of Guildford 1954–65	
Thomas Legh Claughton	Trinity		bishop of Rochester 1867–77, bishop of St Albans 1877-90	
Henry Compton	The Queen's		bishop of Oxford 1674, bishop of London 1675–1713	
David Conner	Exeter and St Stephen's		bishop of Lynn, 1994–98, dean of Windsor 1998–, bishop to the Forces 2001–	
Stephen Conway	Keble		bishop of Ramsbury 2006–	
Thomas William Cook	Hertford		bishop of Lewes 1926-28	
Thomas Cooper	Magdalen and Christ Church		bishop of Lincoln 1571–84, bishop of Winchester 1584–94	
Edward Copleston	Oriel		bishop of Llandaff 1827–49	
George Cotes	Balliol and Magdalen		bishop of Chester 1554–55	
Peter Courtenay	Exeter		bishop of Exeter 1478–87, bishop of Winchester 1487–92	
Richard Courtenay	Exeter		bishop of Norwich 1413–15	
Richard Cox	Cardinal College		dean of Westminster 1549–53, bishop of Ely 1559–80	
Nathaniel Crew, 3rd Baron Crew	Lincoln		bishop of Oxford 1671–74, bishop of Durham 1674–1721	
Francis Whitfield Daukes	Oriel and Wycliffe Hall		bishop of Plymouth 1934–50	
Paul de Labilliere	Merton (undergraduate), Wadham (chaplain), Wycliffe Hall (lecturer)		bishop of Knaresborough 1934–38, dean of Westminster 1938–46	
Robert Deakin			bishop of Tewkesbury 1973–85	
Ivor Colin Docker	St Catherine's Society and Wycliffe Hall	1946-49	bishop of Horsham 1975–91	
John Douglas	Balliol		bishop of Carlisle in 1787–91, bishop of Salisbury 1791–1807	
David Colin Dunlop	New College		provost of St Mary's Cathedral, Edinburgh 1940–44, bishop of Jarrow 1944–49, dean of Lincoln 1949–64	
Alfred Earle	Hertford		bishop of Marlborough 1888–00, dean of Exeter 1900–18	
John Earle	Christ Church and Merton		bishop of Salisbury 1663-65	
Philip Herbert Eliot	Oriel		bishop of Buckingham 1921-44	
Gordon Fallows	St Edmund Hall and Ripon Hall		bishop of Pontefract 1968–71, bishop of Sheffield 1971–79	
John Thornley Finney	Hertford		bishop of Pontefract 1993-98	
Anthony Fisher	Blackfriars		RC auxiliary bishop archdiocese of Sydney since 2003	
George Carnac Fisher	Brasenose		bishop of Southampton 1896–98, bishop of Ipswich 1899–1906	
Joseph Fison	The Queen's and Wycliffe Hall	2nd in Greats, 1st in Theology, BA 1929, MA 1934, BD 1950	bishop of Salisbury 1963-72	
Richard Fleming	University		bishop of Lincoln 1420–31	
Peter Forster	Merton		bishop of Chester since 1996	
Reginald Foskett	Keble		provost of St Mary's Cathedral, Edinburgh 1964–67, bishop of Penrith 1967–70	
Christopher Foster	Wadham		bishop of Hertford 2001-	
Edward Fowler	Corpus Christi		bishop of Gloucester 1691–1714	
Richard Foxe	Magdalen and Corpus Christi		bishop of Exeter (1487–92), Bath & Wells (1492–94), Durham (1494–1501), Winchester (1501–28)	
Robert Frampton	Corpus Christi and Christ Church		bishop of Gloucester 1681–91	
James Fraser	Lincoln and Oriel		bishop of Manchester 1870–85	
Francis Fulford	Exeter		bishop of Montreal 1850–68	
John Garton	Worcester		bishop of Plymouth 1996–2005	
Edgar Charles Sumner Gibson	Trinity		bishop of Gloucester 1905–24	
Theodore Sumner Gibson	Keble		bishop of Kimberley and Kuruman 1928–43, bishop of St John's 1943–51	
William Percy Gilpin	Keble		bishop of Kingston upon Thames 1952–70	
Francis Godwin	Christ Church		bishop of Llandaff 1601–17, bishop of Hereford 1617–34	
Field Flowers Goe	Hertford		bishop of Melbourne 1887-1901	
Archibald Ronald McDonald Gordon	Balliol and Christ Church	BA 1950, MA 1952	bishop Portsmouth 1975–84, bishop Lambeth 1984–91, bishop HM Forces 1985–90, Sub Dean Christ Church 1991-96	
Charles Gore	Balliol, Trinity and Pusey House		bishop of Worcester 1902–05, bishop of Birmingham 1905–32	
Neville Vincent Gorton	Balliol		bishop of Coventry 1943–52	
Arthur Greaves	Keble		bishop of Grantham 1935–37, bishop of Grimsby 1937–58	
George Lanyon Hacker	Exeter		bishop of Penrith 1979-94	
Mervyn George Haigh	New College		bishop of Coventry 1931–42, bishop of Winchester 1942-52	
Robert Hallam			bishop of Salisbury 1408–17	
Walter Kerr Hamilton	Christ Church and Merton		bishop of Salisbury 1854-69	
James Hannington	St Mary's Hall		bishop of Eastern Equatorial Africa 1884–85 and martyr	
John Tyrrell Holmes Hare	Corpus Christi		bishop of Bedford 1968–76	
Richard Hare	Trinity		bishop of Pontefract 1971–92	
Maurice Harland	Exeter		bishop of Croydon 1942–47, bishop of Lincoln 1947–56, bishop of Durham, 1956–66	
Frederick Ochterloney Taylor Hawkes	Magdalen		bishop of Kingston upon Thames 1927–52	
Richard Stephen Hawkins	New College and St Stephen's House		bishop of Plymouth 1988–96, bishop of Crediton 1996–2004	
Robert Milton Hay	St John's		bishop of Buckingham 1944–60	
Arthur Cayley Headlam	All Souls, New College, Christ Church		bishop of Gloucester 1923-45	
Reginald Heber	Brasenose and All Souls		bishop of Calcutta 1823–26	
Herbert Hensley Henson	All Souls		bishop of Hereford 1917–20, bishop of Durham 1920–39	
Augustine John Hodson	Christ Church and St Stephen's House		Bishop of Tewkesbury 1938–55	
Crispian Hollis	Balliol		RC bishop of Portsmouth since 1987	
Campbell Richard Hone	Wadham		bishop of Pontefract 1931–38, bishop of Wakefield 1938–45	
Cecil Hook	Christ Church		bishop of Kingston upon Thames 1905-15	
John Hooper		BA 1519	bishop of Gloucester 1550–53, bishop of Worcester 1552–54, martyr	
Hugh Maudslay Hordern	Christ Church		bishop of Lewes 1929–46	
Hugh Leycester Hornby	Balliol		bishop of Hulme 1945-53	
George Horne	University and Magdalen		bishop of Norwich 1790–92	
William Walsham How	Wadham		bishop of Bedford 1879–89, bishop of Wakefield 1889-97	
Harold Evelyn Hubbard	Christ Church		bishop of Whitby 1939–46	
John Hunter	Keble		bishop of Kimberley and Kuruman 1943–51	
Alexander Hyde	New College		bishop of Salisbury 1665–67	
John Inge	Keble		bishop of Huntingdon 2003–07, bishop of Worcester 2007-	
Edgar Jacob	New College		bishop of Newcastle 1896–1903, bishop of St Albans 1903–19	
William Jacobson	Christ Church		bishop of Chester 1865–84	
Francis Jayne	Wadham		bishop of Chester 1889-19	
Francis Jeune	Pembroke		bishop of Peterborough 1864–68	
David Jenkins	The Queen's	Fellow and Chaplain	bishop of Durham 1984–94	
John Jewel	Merton and Corpus Christi		bishop of Salisbury 1560–71	
Roger Jupp	St Edmund Hall		bishop of Popondota 2003–05	
Eric Waldram Kemp	Exeter, Christ Church and Pusey House		bishop of Chichester 1974–2001	
Thomas Ken	Hart Hall and New College		bishop of Bath and Wells 1685–91	
White Kennett	St Edmund Hall		bishop of Peterborough 1718-28	
George Wyndham Kennion	Oriel		bishop of Adelaide 1882–94, bishop of Bath and Wells 1894–1919	
Edward King	Oriel, Cuddesdon and Christ Church		bishop of Lincoln 1885–1910	
Kenneth E. Kirk	St John's, Magdalen, Trinity and Christ Church		bishop of Oxford 1937–54	
Edward Knapp-Fisher	Trinity		bishop of Pretoria 1960–75, canon of Westminster 1975–87	
Carey Frederick Knyvett	Trinity		bishop of Selby 1941–62	
Arthur Lake	New College		bishop of Bath and Wells 1616–26	
James Henry Langstaff	St Catherine's		bishop of Lynn 2004	
Graham Leonard	Balliol		bishop of Truro 1973–81, bishop of London 1981–91, prelate of honour 2000–	
Michael Lewis	Merton		bishop of Middleton 1999–2007, bishop in Cyprus and the Gulf 2007-	
Martin Linton Smith	Hertford		bishop of Warrington 1918–20, Hereford 1920–30, Rochester 1930-40	
William Somers Llewellyn	Balliol		bishop of Lynn 1963-72	
Tom Longworth	University		bishop of Pontefract 1939–49, bishop of Hereford 1949–61	
Robert Lowth	New College		bishop of St Davids 1766, Oxford 1766–1777, London 1777–87, declined Canterbury 1783	
Henry Mackenzie	Pembroke		bishop of Nottingham 1870-77	
John Victor Macmillan	Magdalen		bishop of Dover 1927–34, bishop of Guildford 1934–49	
David Rokeby Maddock	St Catherine's Society		bishop of Dunwich 1967–76	
John Primatt Maud	Keble		bishop of Kensington 1911–32	
Malcolm Menin	University		bishop of Knaresborough 1986–97	
Peter Mews	St John's		bishop of Bath and Wells 1672–84, bishop of Winchester 1684–1706	
George Moberly	Balliol		bishop of Salisbury 1869-85	
Hugh Montefiore	St John's		bishop of Kingston upon Thames 1970–78, bishop of Birmingham 1977-87	
George Morley	Christ Church		bishop of Worcester 1660–62, bishop of Winchester 1662–84	
Peter Mumford	University		bishop of Hertford 1974–81, bishop of Truro 1981–89	
Gordon Mursell	Brasenose		bishop of Stafford 1999-	
Michael Nazir-Ali	St Edmund Hall		bishop of Raiwind 1984–86, bishop of Rochester 1994–	
William Nicolson	The Queen's		bishop of Carlisle 1702–18, of Derry 1718–27, appointed archbishop of Cashel and Emly before death	
Owen Oglethorpe	Magdalen and Christ Church		bishop of Carlisle 1557-59	
Hugh Oldham	Exeter		bishop of Exeter 1504–19	
John Owen	Jesus		bishop of St Davids 1827–1926	
John Richard Packer	Keble		bishop of Warrington 1996–2000, bishop of Ripon and Leeds 2000–	
Henry Luke Paget	Christ Church		bishop of Ipswich 1906–09, bishop of Stepney 1909–19, bishop of Chester 1919–32	
Clement George St Michael Parker	Christ Church		bishop of Aston 1954–61, bishop of Bradford 1961–71	
Samuel Parker	Wadham, Trinity and Magdalen		bishop of Oxford 1686–87	
Edward Parry (Bishop)	Balliol		bishop of Dover 1870–90	
Richard Godfrey Parsons	Magdalen and University		bishop of Middleton 1927–32, bishop of Southwark 1932–41, bishop of Hereford 1942–48	
Reginald Pecock	Oriel		bishop of St Asaph 1444–50, bishop of Chichester 1450–57	
Herbert Sidney Pelham	University		bishop of Barrow-in-Furness 1926–1944	
John Penny	Lincoln		bishop of Bangor 1504–08, bishop of Carlisle 1508-20	
George Christopher Cutts Pepys	Oriel		bishop of Buckingham 1964–74	
William Michael Dermot Persson	Oriel		bishop of Doncaster 1982–1992	
Henry Phillpotts	Corpus Christi and Magdalen		bishop of Exeter 1831–69	
Barnaby Potter	The Queen's		bishop of Carlisle 1629-42	
David Brownfield Porter	Hertford and Wycliffe		bishop of Aston 1962–72	
Grandage Edwards Powell	University		bishop of Penrith 1939-44	
John Lawrence Pritchard	St Peter's		archdeacon of Canterbury 1996–2002, bishop of Jarrow 2002–06, bishop of Oxford 2007–	
Edward Rainbowe	Corpus Christi		bishop of Carlisle 1664-84	
Ronald Erskine Ramsay	St Edmund Hall		bishop of Malmesbury 1927–46	
John Randolph	Christ Church		bishop of Oxford 1799–1807, bishop of Bangor 1807–09, bishop of London 1809–13	
Alastair Llewellyn John Redfern	Christ Church		bishop of Grantham 1997–2005, bishop of Derby 2005–	
Clement Mallory Ricketts	Keble		bishop of Dunwich 1945–55	
John Rider	Jesus		bishop of Killaloe 1612–1632	
George Ridding	Balliol and Exeter		headmaster of Winchester 1867–84, bishop of Southwell 1884–1904	
Henry Robinson	The Queen's College and St Edmund Hall		bishop of Carlisle 1598-1616	
John Robinson	Brasenose and Oriel		bishop of Bristol 1710–14, bishop of London 1714–23, Lord Privy Seal 1711-1713	
Patrick Campbell Rodger	Christ Church		bishop of Manchester 1970–78, bishop of Oxford 1978-86	
Gordon Roe	Jesus		bishop of Huntingdon 1980–97	
Alfred Carey Wollaston Rose	Worcester		bishop of Dover 1935–56	
Geoffrey Rowell	Keble		bishop of Basingstoke 1994–2001, bishop of Gibraltar in Europe 2001–	
Anthony Russell	Trinity		bishop of Dorchester 1988–2000, bishop of Ely 2000–	
John Charles Ryle	Christ Church		bishop of Liverpool 1880–1900	
Wilfrid Guy Sanderson	Merton		bishop of Plymouth 1962-72	
Gordon David Savage	St Catherine's		bishop of Buckingham 1960–64, bishop of Southwell 1964–70	
Peter Selby	St John's		bp of Kingston upon Thames 1984–92, Wm Leech Professorial Fell in Applied Chr Th Univ of Durham 1992–97, bp of Worcester 1997–2007, bp to HM Prisons 2001-	
William Senhouse			bishop of Carlisle 1495–1502, bishop of Durham 1502-05	
Edward Domett Shaw	Oriel		bishop of Buckingham 1914–21	
John Sheppey			bishop of Rochester 1353–60, lord high treasurer 1356-60	
George Smalridge	Christ Church		bishop of Bristol 1714–19	
George Smith			bishop of Victoria & warden of St Paul's College, Hong Kong 1849–65	
Lucius Smith	Balliol		bishop of Knaresborough 1905–34	
Miles Smith	Corpus Christi and Brasenose		bishop of Gloucester 1612–24, author of Preface to the Authorized Version	
Robin Jonathan Norman Smith	Worcester		bishop of Hertford 1990-2001	
Thomas Smith	The Queen's		bishop of Carlisle 1684-1702	
Alan Smithson	The Queen's		bishop of Jarrow 1990-2001	
William Smyth	Oriel and/or Lincoln		bishop of Coventry & Lichfield 1493–96, bishop of Lincoln 1496–1514	
Stuart Snell	St Peter's		bishop of Croydon 1977–85, bishop to the Forces 1977–84	
George D'Oyly Snow	Oriel		bishop of Whitby 1961–71	
Henry Kemble Southwell	Magdalen		bishop of Lewes 1920–26	
Thomas Sprat	Wadham		bishop of Rochester 1684–1713	
Thomas Stanage	Pembroke		bishop of Johannesburg 1978–82, bishop of Bloemfontein 1982–97	
David Stancliffe	Trinity		bishop of Salisbury 1993–	
Robert Stopford	Hertford		bishop of Fulham 1955–56, Peterborough 1956–61, London 1961–73, Bermuda 1976	
Neville Stuart Talbot	Christ Church and Balliol		bishop of Pretoria 1920–33, vicar of Nottingham 1933–43, chaplain RAF 1943	
Thomas Tanner	The Queen's College, All Souls and Christ Church		bishop of St Asaph 1732–35	
John Vernon Taylor	St Catherine's Society, Wycliffe Hall		Bishop of Winchester 1974-84	
Frederick Stephen Temple	Balliol		bishop of Malmesbury 1973–83	
David Thomson	Keble		bishop of Huntingdon 2008-	
Richard Thornden	Canterbury		bishop of Dover 1545-57	
Edward Trollope	Christ Church		bishop of Nottingham 1877-93	
Cuthbert Tunstall			bishop of London 1522–30, Lord Privy Seal 1523–30, bishop of Durham 1530-52 & 1553–58	
Michael Turnbull	Keble		bishop of Rochester 1988–94, bishop of Durham 1994-2003	
Herbert Victor Turner	Merton		bishop of Penrith 1944-58	
William Van Mildert	Christ Church		bishop of Llandaff 1819–26, bishop of Durham 1826-36	
Stephen Venner	Linacre and St Stephen's House		bishop of Middleton 1994–99, bishop of Dover 1999-	
John Vesey	Magdalen		bishop of Exeter 1519–51	
Michael Edwin Vickers	Worcester		bishop of Colchester 1988–94	
Samuel Waldegrave	Balliol		bishop of Carlisle 1860-69	
Eric Wall	Brasenose		bishop of Huntingdon 1972–80	
William Walsh	Merton		bishop of Mauritius 1891–97, bishop of Dover 1898–16	
Seth Ward	Trinity (Master)		Savilian Professor, bishop of Exeter 1662–67, of Salisbury 1667–89	
Geoffrey Hodgson Warde	Keble		dean of Gibraltar 1928–33, bishop of Lewes 1946–59	
Richard Charles Challinor Watson	New College		bishop of Burnley 1970–88	
William Waynflete	New College (possibly), founder of Magdalen		bishop of Winchester 1447–86, Lord Chancellor 1456-60	
John Stewart Went	Wycliffe Hall (Vice-Principal)		bishop of Tewkesbury 1996–2005	
Herbert Westfaling	Christ Church		bishop of Hereford 1586–1602	
Frank Weston	Trinity		bishop of Zanzibar 1908–1924, Major commanding Zanzibar Carrier Corps 1916, mentioned in despatches 1917, OBE 1918	
Frank Valentine Weston	The Queen's and Christ Church		bishop of Knaresborough 1997–2003	
Martin Wharton	Linacre		bishop of Newcastle 1997–	
Peter Wheatley	The Queen's		bishop of Edmonton 1999–	
Hubert Whitsey	St Edmund Hall		bishop of Hertford 1971–74, bishop of Chester 1974–81	
Samuel Wilberforce	Oriel		bishop of Oxford 1845–70, bishop of Winchester 1870-73	
David Peter Wilcox	St John's		bishop of Dorking 1986–95	
John Wilkins	Magdalen and Wadham		bishop of Chester 1668–72	
Alwyn Williams	Jesus, All Souls, Christ Church	Triple 1st in Mods 1908, Greats 1910, History 1911, Fellow All Souls 1911–18, Dean Christ Church 1934-39	bishop of Durham 1939–52, bishop of Winchester 1952–61	
Trevor Willmott	St Peter's		bishop of Basingstoke 2002-	
Alan Wilson	Balliol and Wycliffe Hall		bishop of Buckingham 2003-	
John Leonard Wilson	The Queen's and Wycliffe Hall		bishop of Birmingham 1953–69	
Colin Winter	Lincoln		bishop of Damaraland 1968–81	
Kenneth John Woollcombe	St John's		Bishop of Oxford 1971–78	
John Wordsworth	New College, Brasenose and Oriel		bishop of Salisbury 1885–1911	
Robert Wright	Trinity and Wadham		bishop of Bristol 1623–32, bishop of Lichfield and Coventry 1632–43	
Tom Wright	Exeter, Merton, Oxford and Wycliffe Hall		bishop of Durham 2003–	

=== Clergy and other ministers ===
The following are clergymen and other Christian ministers who are primarily known for their non-theological contributions to the Church, although some may also have been significant scholars

- Fitzherbert Adams (Lincoln) rector of Lincoln College and prebendary of Durham Cathedral 1685-1719
- Simon Bailey (Regent's Park) rector of Dinnington, writer, art collector
- Thomas Bastard (New College)
- Peter Beck dean of ChristChurch Cathedral (Christchurch, New Zealand) since 2002
- Derek Pattinson (The Queen's) Secretary-General of the General Synod of the Church of England 1972-90
- Richard Meux Benson (Christ Church) founder Society of St John the Evangelist
- Adam Blakeman (Christ Church) minister of Stratford, Connecticut 1639-65
- William Henry Bliss (Magdalen) sometime tutor to King Victor Emmanuel III
- Thomas Bradley (Exeter) chaplain who ministered to Charles I at his execution
- Thomas Bray (All Souls) missionary to Maryland 1699–1700, rector of St Botolph Aldgate 1706-30
- Edward Cadogan (Christ Church) Rector of Wicken 1872-1890
- Thomas Charles (Jesus) Anglican priest and Methodist
- Richard William Church (Wadham and Oriel) Dean of St Paul's 1871-90
- Thomas Coke (Jesus) father of Methodist missions and successor to John Wesley
- John Davenport after whom Davenport College, Yale is named; co-founder Colony of New Haven & Hopkins School
- Harold Davidson (Exeter) rector of Stiffkey 1906-32
- Percy Dearmer (Christ Church) liturgist, socialist, Professor of King's College London, Canon of Westminster
- Verrier Elwin (Merton and Wycliffe Hall)
- John Feckenham (Gloucester Hall) Dean of St Paul's 1554–56, Abbot of Westminster 1556-60
- Edward Drax Free (St John's)
- Bernard Green (St Benet's) Catholic priest and monk of Ampleforth
- Michael Green (Exeter and Wycliffe Hall) priest, professor, and evangelist
- Robin Griffith-Jones (New College and Lincoln) The Reverend and Valiant Master of the Temple 1999-
- Bede Griffiths (Magdalen)
- Nicky Gumbel (Wycliffe Hall) Asst Curate Holy Trinity Brompton 1986–2005, Vicar 2005-, head of Alpha 1990-
- William Ralph Inge (Hertford) Dean of St Paul's 1911-34
- Cyril Jackson (Christ Church) tutor to George IV; declined bpric of Oxford (1799) & archbpric of Armagh (1800)
- Hewlett Johnson (Wadham) "Red" Dean of Canterbury 1931-63
- R. T. Kendall (Regent's Park) Minister of Westminster Chapel 1977-2002
- Vicesimus Knox (St John's) essayist and sometime Head Master of Tonbridge School
- Christopher Lewis (Ripon Coll Cuddesdon & Christ Church) Dean of St Albans 1994–2003, of Christ Church 2003-
- Alexander Heriot Mackonochie (Wadham) Master of the Society of the Holy Cross 1863–75
- Malachi Martin (Not known) Author and exorcist
- John Mason (All Souls) Dean of Winchester 1549-54
- Edward Meyrick Goulburn (Balliol and Merton) Head Master of Rugby 1849–57, Dean of Norwich 1866-89
- Alexander Nowell (Brasenose) Dean of St Paul's 1560-1602
- Richard Pace Secretary of State 1516–26, Dean of St Paul's 1519-36
- A. P. Stanley (Balliol & University) Dean of Westminster 1863–81, Rector of St Andrews 1874-77
- Montague Summers (Trinity) poet and expert on Gothic literature, witchcraft, vampires, and werewolves
- Chad Varah (Keble) Rector of St Stephen Walbrook 1953–2003, founder of The Samaritans 1953
- Lawrence Washington (Brasenose) great-great-grandfather of George Washington
- Charles Wesley (Christ Church) hymn writer and brother of John Wesley
- John Wesley (Christ Church and Lincoln) founder of Methodism
- George Whitefield (Pembroke) founder of Methodism
- John Yonge (New College) Master of the Rolls 1508–16, Dean of York 1514-16
- Richard Calne Canon of Lanthony Secunda Priory, fl. c. 1413 – c. 1421

== Islam ==
- Rashid Khalidi (St Antony's) Edward Said Prof of Arab Studies & Head, Middle East Inst, Columbia Univ 2003-
- Ilse Lichtenstädter
- Martin Lings (Abu Bakr Siraj Ad-Din) (Magdalen) Keeper of Oriental Printed Books & MSS, British Museum 1970-73
- David Samuel Margoliouth
- Ali Mazrui (Nuffield)
- Josef W. Meri (Wolfson)
- Farhan Nizami (Wadham, St Cross, and Magdalen)
- Fazlur Rahman
- Tariq Ramadan (St Antony's)

== Judaism ==
Chief Rabbis of the United Hebrew Congregations of Great Britain and the Commonwealth

- Sir Israel Brodie (Balliol) Chief Rabbi 1948-65
- Jonathan Sacks, Baron Sacks (New College) Chief Rabbi 1991–2013

Other rabbis

- Lionel Blue 1930–2016 (Balliol)
- Moses Gaster (Lecturer in Slavonic Literature at Oxford 1886-91)

Scholars

- Martin Goodman (Trinity and Wolfson)
- Jacob Neusner (Lincoln)

== Sikhism ==
- Jagraj Singh

== Bahá'í ==
- Shoghi Effendi 1919-1921 (Balliol) Guardian of the Bahá'í Faith 1921-57

== Hinduism ==
- Shaunaka Rishi Das

== See also ==
- A select list of former Rhodes Scholars
- List of Vice-Chancellors of the University of Oxford
- List of Current Heads of Oxford University Colleges, Societies, and Halls
