= Martyn Snow =

British Anglican bishop and Lord Spiritual (born 1968)

The Right Reverend Martyn Snow
- Bishop of Leicester
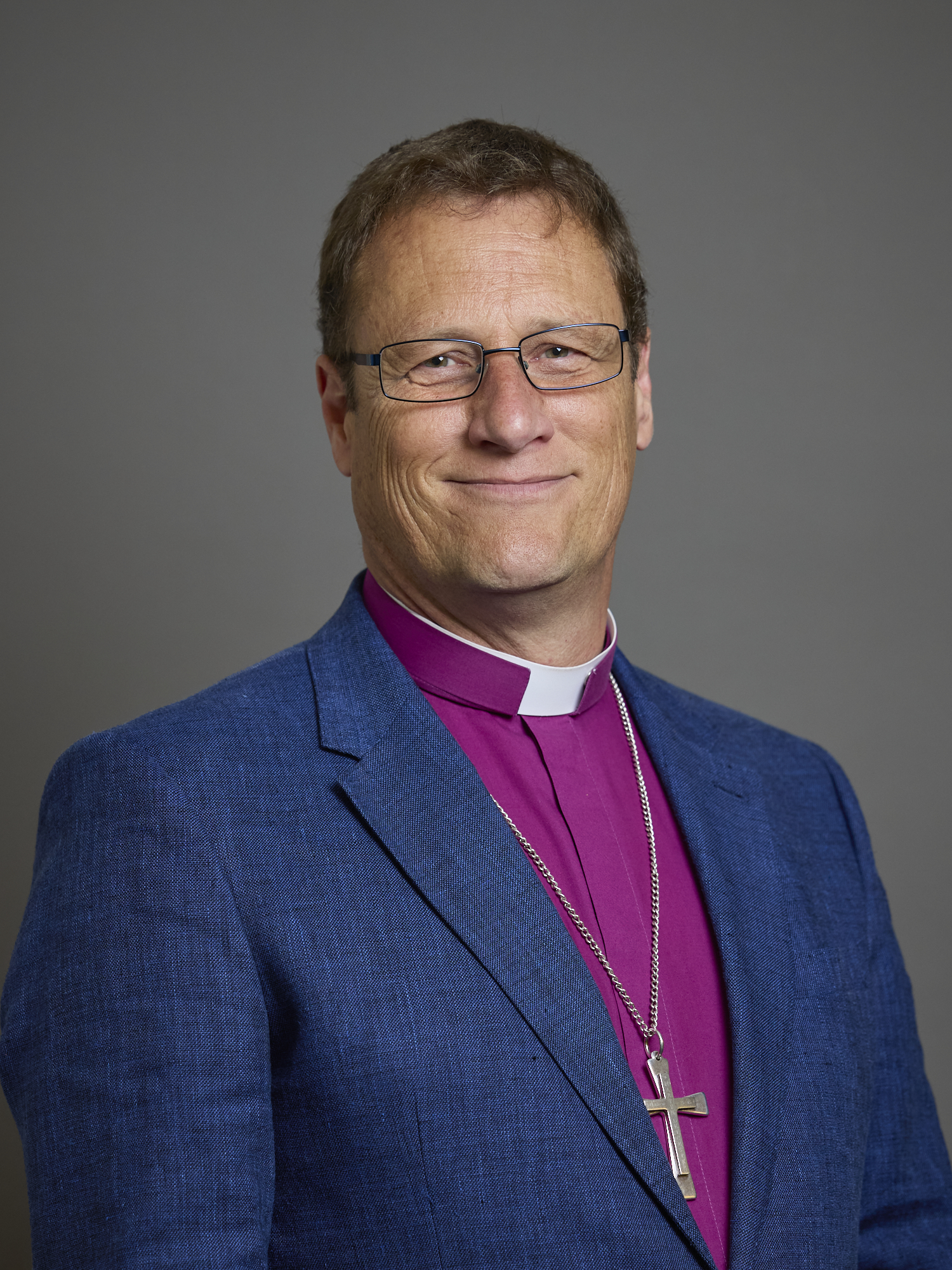
- Official portrait, 2025
- Church: Church of England
- Diocese: Leicester
- In office: 2016–present
- Predecessor: Tim Stevens
- Other posts: Lead bishop for Living in Love and Faith (2023–2025)
- Previous posts: Bishop of Tewkesbury (2013‍–‍2016); Archdeacon of Sheffield and Rotherham (2010‍–‍2013)

Orders
- Ordination: 2 July 1995 (deacon) by David Lunn; 5 July 1996 (priest) by Michael Gear
- Consecration: 25 September 2013 by Justin Welby

Personal details
- Born: Martyn James Snow; 25 January 1968 (age 58) Indonesia
- Denomination: Anglicanism
- Residence: Bishop's Lodge, Knighton
- Spouse: Lynn Snow
- Children: 3
- Education: University of Sheffield

Member of the House of Lords
- Lord Spiritual
- Bishop of Leicester; 8 November 2022

Martyn James Snow (born 25 January 1968) is a British Anglican bishop. Since 2016, he has been the Bishop of Leicester. He previously served as Bishop of Tewkesbury from 2013 to 2016, and as Archdeacon of Sheffield and Rotherham from 2010 to 2013.

== Early life and education ==
Martyn James Snow was born on 25 January 1968 in Indonesia. His parents worked with the church in Indonesia and his grandparents were missionaries in China. His grandfather was James O. Fraser who pioneered work among the Lisu people of Southwestern China and is credited with developing the Fraser script for their language.

Snow studied chemistry at Sheffield University, graduating with a Bachelor of Science (BSc) degree in 1989. He trained for ordination at Wycliffe Hall, Oxford, graduating with a Bachelor of Theology (BTh) degree in 1995. He also holds a Master of Arts (MA) degree in theology from Durham University which he completed in 2012.

== Deacon and priest ==
Snow was made a deacon at Petertide 1995 (2 July) by David Lunn, Bishop of Sheffield, at Sheffield Cathedral and ordained a priest the Petertide following (5 July 1996) by Michael Gear, Bishop of Doncaster at his title church (St Andrew's, Brinsworth). He was an assistant curate at Brinsworth with Catcliffe and Treeton before service with the Church Mission Society in Guinea. He worked as Youth Chaplain with the Anglican Diocese of Guinea in the Church of the Province of West Africa. He was vicar of Christ Church, Pitsmoor from 2001 to 2010 and area dean of Ecclesfield from 2007. In 2010 he became Archdeacon of Sheffield and Rotherham.

== Episcopal ministry ==
On 25 September 2013, Snow was consecrated a bishop by Justin Welby, Archbishop of Canterbury, during a service in Westminster Abbey. In October 2013, he started his duties as Bishop of Tewkesbury, a suffragan bishop in the Diocese of Gloucester. He was acting diocesan Bishop of Gloucester from 5 August 2014 until Rachel Treweek took up the role of diocesan bishop in June 2015.

On 15 December 2015, it was announced that Snow would be translated to Leicester in 2016. Snow officially became Bishop of Leicester with the confirmation of his election on 22 February 2016. He then become the youngest diocesan bishop in the Church of England, aged 48. On 14 May 2016, a service of installation was held at Leicester Cathedral during which he was seated on his Cathedra and given the crozier of the Diocese of Leicester.

In May 2016 Snow was one of six bishops cited in The Guardian and Church Times as subject of Clergy Disciplinary Measure complaints owing to their alleged inaction on a disclosure by a sexual assault survivor. The bishops contested the complaints. From October that year, Snow sat on the Church of England's National Safeguarding Steering Group (NSSG). He resigned in 2020.

In 2021, Snow was involved in a diocesan HR investigation into the activities of a female licensed lay minister, who was accused of stalking and harassing Jay Hulme, churchwarden of St Nicholas Church, Leicester. In an interview with the BBC in June 2025, Hulme reported that Snow had declined to uphold his complaint against the licensed lay minister. In Hulme's account of this meeting, he stated that Snow accused him of having conducted a séance in the church, and of practising witchcraft, and told Hulme that the process for him to begin training for the priesthood would be slowed. The licensed lay minister subsequently pleaded guilty to stalking and received an 18-month community order. A statement from the Diocese of Leicester on 29 June 2025 confirmed that Bishop Snow had received the advice of an independent HR expert in May 2022 that the complaint against the licensed lay minister should be upheld, but that he had chosen not to withdraw her licence. He subsequently did so on 25 July 2022, following the receipt of further evidence. A subsequent statement also confirmed that Snow had brought up the alleged séance and use of tarot cards in his initial conversation with Hulme, but denied the claim that he had accused him of witchcraft. A final statement on 30 June added that the Diocese of Leicester had been advised to lodge a formal complaint against the BBC for their coverage.

Between 2017 and 2024, Snow was chair of the College of Archbishops' Evangelists. In April 2021, Snow became the bishop protector for the third order of Franciscans, the Third Order Society of St Francis (TSSF). Snow is also sponsoring bishop for the Church of England project to grow the number of children and youth ministers in the church to 30,000. He is also a member of the Committee for Minority Ethnic Anglican Concerns.

In Leicester, Snow is also chair of the Oversight Group for Leicester Homelessness Charter, an umbrella organisation for businesses, charities and statutory agencies who work with people who have experienced homelessness.

He became a member of the House of Lords (as a Lord Spiritual) on 6 October 2022.

== Views and positions ==
=== Racial justice ===
Snow has been outspoken on issues of racial justice including 'taking the knee' outside Leicester Cathedral in July 2020 and speaking at a conference on the subject of Whiteness.

=== Same-sex relationships ===
In January 2023, following the news that the House of Bishop's of the Church of England was to introduce proposals for blessing same-sex relationships, he signed an open letter which stated:

many Christians in the Church of England and the Anglican Communion, together with Christians from across the churches of world Christianity, continue to believe that marriage is given by God for the union of a man and woman and that it cannot be extended to those who are of the same sex.

In February 2023, Snow voted to approve blessings for same-sex couples in the Church of England. In November 2023, Snow abstained during a vote on introducing "standalone services for same-sex couples" on a trial basis during a meeting of the General Synod; the motion passed. In February 2023, he had spoken of his willingness to implement the votes of the General Synod on the Prayers of Love and Faith even though he had not voted for them, and in November that year he became the lead bishop for the Living in Love and Faith (LLF) process involving the introduction of "Prayers of Love and Faith" for same sex couples. Despite this, he maintains a "traditional understanding of marriage as a lifelong union of one man and one woman".

On 6 June 2025, Bishop Snow announced that he was stepping down as lead bishop for LLF 'with a heavy heart'. The Church Times reported that it had become clear that a majority of bishops did not support his proposal for a separate system of episcopal oversight for parishes opposed to the use of Prayers of Love and Faith.

=== State benefits ===
Snow has been active in campaigning for the government to scrap the two-child limit on benefits.

== Works ==
- Coaching in the Church: leadership and growing the skills of those around you., Grove Books Ltd, 2008 ISBN 1851746986
- Leading Change in the Church: and involving everyone in the process., Grove Books Ltd, 2009 ISBN 1851747338
- Mission Partnerships: parishes working together in mission., Grove Books Ltd, 2013 ISBN 1851748598
- Reflections for Daily Prayer: Advent 2015 to Christ the King 2016., Church House Publishing, 2015 ISBN 071514457X
- Pilgrim: The Creeds., Church House Publishing, 2015 ISBN 0715144448
- Developing Leaders, https://www.biblesociety.org.uk/uploads/content/bible_in_transmission/files/2015_summer/BiT_Summer_2015_Snow.pdf
- Resourcing Sunday to Saturday Faith: Readers, Lay Ministry and Everyday Faith., 2018, https://transformingministry.co.uk/wp-content/uploads/2021/02/Resourcing-Faith-Booklet-April-19.pdf
- Anglican Evangelists: identifying and training a new generation., SPCK, 2019 ISBN 0281083649
- Anglican Discipleship: everyday faith and everyday witness., Grove Books Ltd, 2021 ISBN 1788271602
- Seeking an Intercultural Church., https://d3hgrlq6yacptf.cloudfront.net/61f2fd86f0ee5/content/pages/documents/ojim-spring-2024.pdf
- An Intercultural Church for a Multicultural World: reflections on intercultural gift exchange., Church House Publishing, 2024 ISBN 9781781404720

Church of England titles
Preceded by Richard Blackburn	Archdeacon of Sheffield and Rotherham; 2010–2013	Succeeded by Malcolm Chamberlain
Preceded by John Went	Bishop of Tewkesbury; 2013–2016	Succeeded by Robert Springett
Preceded by Tim Stevens	Bishop of Leicester; 2016–present	Incumbent
