= Roger Sharpley =

Archdeacon of Hackney

Roger Ernest Dion Sharpley (19 December 1928 – 17 February 2018) was an English Anglican priest who was the third Archdeacon of Hackney, a post he held from 1981 to 1992, during which time he was also Vicar of St Andrew, Holborn.

Born on 19 December 1928 and educated at Dulwich College and Christ Church, Oxford he was ordained after a period of study at St Stephen's House, Oxford in 1955. He was Curate of St Columba, Southwick, then Vicar of All Saints’, Middlesbrough from 1960 to 1981, when he accepted his Archdeacon’s appointment.

Church of England titles
Preceded by George Timms	Archdeacon of Hackney; 1981–1992	Succeeded by Clive Young
