= Robert Springett =

British Anglican bishop (born 1962)

The Right Reverend Robert Springett
- Bishop of Tewkesbury
- Church: Church of England
- Diocese: Diocese of Gloucester
- In office: 30 November 2016–present
- Predecessor: Martyn Snow
- Other post: Lead bishop for safeguarding (2026–present)
- Previous post: Archdeacon of Cheltenham (2010–2016)

Orders
- Ordination: 1989 (deacon); 1990 (priest)
- Consecration: 30 November 2016 by Justin Welby

Personal details
- Born: Robert Wilfrid Springett; 15 September 1962 (age 64)
- Denomination: Anglicanism
- Spouse: Helen
- Children: Two
- Education: Lincoln Theological College; University of Nottingham; King's College London

Robert Wilfrid Springett (born 15 September 1962) is a British Anglican bishop. He has served as the Bishop of Tewkesbury (a suffragan bishop in the Diocese of Gloucester) since his consecration as a bishop on 30 November 2016. He previously served as the Archdeacon of Cheltenham in the same diocese from 2010.

== Early life and education ==
Springett was born on 15 September 1962. He was educated at Brentwood School, a private school in Brentwood, Essex, and at Chelmsford College, a further education college in Chelmsford, Essex. In 1986, he entered Lincoln Theological College, an Anglican theological college, to train for ordination. During this time, he also studied theology at the University of Nottingham and graduated with a Bachelor of Theology (BTh) degree in 1989. Following ordination, he undertook postgraduate studies at King's College London, and graduated with a Master of Arts (MA) degree from the University of London in 1992.

== Ordained ministry ==
Springett was ordained in the Church of England as a deacon in 1989 and as a priest in 1990. From 1989 to 1992, he served his curacy at St James the Great, Colchester, an Anglo-Catholic parish in the Diocese of Chelmsford. He was then a curate at St Martin of Tours, Basildon, between 1992 and 1994. In 1994, he became priest-in-charge of All Saints, Belhus Park and St Nicholas, South Ockendon. From 1998 to 2001, he was also Rural Dean of Thurrock. In 2001, he was appointed Rector of the Parish of Wanstead. During his time as incumbent of the parish, he "led the church into significant growth". From 2008 to 2010, he was also Area Dean of Redbridge. In 2008, he was made an Honorary Canon of Chelmsford Cathedral.

In April 2010, Springett moved to the Diocese of Gloucester where he had been appointed the Archdeacon of Cheltenham. As an archdeacon, he was one of the most senior priests in the diocese and was responsible for four deaneries (Cheltenham, Tewkesbury and Winchcombe, Cirencester, and the Cotswolds). He was a member of the Crown Nominations Commission that chose Rachel Treweek as Bishop of Gloucester in 2015 (she became the first woman diocesan bishop in the Church of England).

=== Episcopal ministry ===
On 25 July 2016, it was announced Springett was to become the next Bishop of Tewkesbury, a suffragan bishop in the Diocese of Gloucester. He was consecrated a bishop on 30 November 2016 during a service at Canterbury Cathedral, and was welcomed as the Bishop of Tewkesbury during a service at Gloucester Cathedral on 11 December 2016. He has been chair of the Diocesan Board of Education since 2017, and therefore leads the oversight of the diocese's 116 church schools.

From January 2024 until March 2026, he was additionally one of two deputy lead bishops for safeguarding. In April 2026, he succeeded Joanne Grenfell as the church's lead bishop for safeguarding.

=== Views ===
In January 2023, Springett stated that he supports the celebration and blessing of "faithful monogamous same-sex relationships", but does not support changing the Church of England's doctrine of marriage (i.e. that marriage is the life long union of one man and one woman).

In November 2023, he was one of 44 Church of England bishops who signed an open letter supporting the use of the Prayers of Love and Faith (i.e. blessings for same-sex couples) and called for "Guidance being issued without delay that includes the removal of all restrictions on clergy entering same-sex civil marriages, and on bishops ordaining and licensing such clergy".

== Personal life ==
In 1991, Springett married Helen Bates. Together, they have two daughters; Charlotte and Alice.

Church of England titles
Preceded by Hedley Ringrose	Archdeacon of Cheltenham; 2010–2016	Succeeded by Phil Andrew
Preceded by Martyn Snow	Bishop of Tewkesbury; 2016–present	Incumbent
