= Jeremy Walsh =

Bishop of Tewkesbury

The Right Reverend Jeremy Walsh
- Bishop of Tewkesbury
- Diocese: Diocese of Gloucester
- In office: 1986–1995
- Predecessor: Robert Deakin
- Successor: John Went

Orders
- Consecration: 29 January 1986 by Robert Runcie

Personal details
- Born: 1929 (age 96–97)
- Denomination: Anglican
- Spouse: Cynthia Knight
- Education: Pembroke College, Cambridge

Geoffrey David Jeremy Walsh (born 1929 - 24 June 2026) was the fifth Anglican Bishop of Tewkesbury (the suffragan bishop in the Diocese of Gloucester) from January 1986 until his retirement in October 1995.

Educated at Felsted School and Pembroke College, Cambridge Walsh studied for ordination at Lincoln Theological College before embarking on curacies in Southgate, London and Cambridge. From 1958 until 1961 he was Staff Secretary of the SCM and from then until 1966 Vicar of St Mary Moorfields, Bristol. There then followed two rectorships of ten years apiece at, firstly, Marlborough and latterly Ipswich. Appointment to the suffragan bishopric of Tewkesbury in 1986 completed his ecclesiastical career and he retired (to Ipswich) in 1995. He was ordained and consecrated a bishop (thereby taking up his suffragan see) on 29 January 1986, by Robert Runcie, Archbishop of Canterbury, at Gloucester Cathedral.

Walsh died in 2026, aged 96.
