= Lyle Dennen =

Lyle Dennen is an Anglican priest, most notably a former Archdeacon of Hackney: a post he held from 1999 to 2010.

Born on 8 January 1942 and educated at Trinity College, Cambridge, he was ordained in 1972. He was Curate at St Anne, South Lambeth then Curate in charge of St Matthias, Richmond. He was Vicar of St John the Divine, Kennington from 1978 to 1999; and also Rural Dean of Brixton from 1988. He was Vicar of St Andrew, Holborn from 1999 until his retirement on 8 January 2014.

Church of England titles
Preceded by Clive Young	Archdeacon of Hackney; 1999–2010	Succeeded by Rachel Treweek
