= Liz Adekunle =

British Anglican priest (born 1977)

Elizabeth Adekunle (born 1977) is a British Anglican priest and former Archdeacon of Hackney, London.

Born in 1977 in North London, United Kingdom, Adekunle read theology at Birmingham University, graduating as Bachelor of Theology (BTh), before pursuing further studies in divinity at London and Cambridge universities: MA in African Christianity (SOAS) and in Pastoral care and counselling (Cantab), while training at Ridley Hall, Cambridge for ordination.

Ordained in the Church of England, Adekunle was, from 2007 to 2011, curate and then priest-in-charge at St Luke's Church, Hackney. During this time she also served as a chaplain to Homerton Hospital and St Mellitus College. Adekunle was appointed chaplain of St John's College, Cambridge in 2011, serving till 2016.

On 1 July 2015, Adekunle was appointed as Archdeacon of Hackney in the Diocese of London following Bishop Rachel Treweek; She was collated as archdeacon on 5 April 2016, when she became joint patron of the living of St John's Hoxton (with the Haberdashers' Company). She resigned effective 13 August 2021 and was reported to be pursuing non-executive roles in the health service and public sector.

== See also ==
- Diocese of London

Church of England titles
Preceded by Rachel Treweek	Archdeacon of Hackney; 2016–2021	Succeeded by Peter Farley-Moore
