= Hilary Dawson =

British Anglican priest

Hilary Joan Dawson (born 3 October 1964) is a British Anglican priest. Since 2019, she has served as Archdeacon of Gloucester in the Church of England Diocese of Gloucester.

Dawson was educated at the University of Wales, the University of the West of England and the University of Exeter. She was formerly a social worker then a teacher. Dawson was ordained in the Church of England as a deacon in 2008 and as a priest in 2009. She served her title in the Netherexe Parishes in the Diocese of Exeter between 2008 and 2011. She was Rector of the Holyford Mission Community in the Diocese of Exeter until her appointment as Archdeacon. She has announced her intention to resign effective 19 December 2025.

Church of England titles
Preceded by Jackie Searle	Archdeacon of Gloucester; 2019–present	Succeeded by Incumbent
