= Forbes Horan =

Forbes Trevor Horan was the Anglican Bishop of Tewkesbury from 1960 to 1973.

The son of a clergyman, Horan was educated at Sherborne and Trinity Hall, Cambridge. After a short military career in the Oxfordshire and Buckinghamshire Light Infantry he studied for ordination at Westcott House, Cambridge and from 1933 embarked on curacies in Newcastle upon Tyne before wartime service in the RNVR. Livings in Shrewsbury and Huddersfield followed before his elevation to the suffragan bishopric of Tewkesbury in 1960. After 13 years he resigned to begin retirement in Cheltenham. His first wife died in 1983 and five years later at the age of 83 he married again. He died on 11 May 1996

== Notes ==
Church of England titles
| Preceded by Edward Barry Henderson | Bishop of Tewkesbury; 1960 – 1973 | Succeeded by Robert Deakin |
