= Michael Hodgins =

Michael Minden Hodgins (26 August 1912 – 11 May 1998) was the inaugural Archdeacon of Hackney: a post he held from 1951 to 1971. Born into a military family and educated at Wellington College, Berkshire, he was ordained after a period of study at Ripon College Cuddesdon in 1939. After a curacy at St Barnabas, Northolt Park he was Secretary of the London Diocesan Fund from 1946 to 1974.

Church of England titles
Preceded by Inaugural appointment	Archdeacon of Hackney; 1951–1971	Succeeded by George Boorne Timms
