= George Timms =

George Boorne Timms (4 October 1910 – 15 November 1997) was the second Archdeacon of Hackney, a post he held from 1971 to 1981.

Born on 4 October 1910 and educated at Derby School and St Edmund Hall, Oxford he was ordained after a period of study at the College of the Resurrection, Mirfield in 1936. After curacies at St Mary Magdalen, Coventry and St Bartholomew, Reading he was the Oxford Diocesan Inspector of Schools from 1944 to 1949. He was Sacrist of Southwark Cathedral from 1949 to 1952 then Vicar of St Mary, Primrose Hill until 1965. After this he was Rural Dean of Hampstead and then Vicar of St Andrew, Holborn before his Archdeacon’s appointment.

A noted author, he died on 15 November 1997.

Church of England titles
Preceded by Michael Minden Hodgins	Archdeacon of Hackney; 1971–1981	Succeeded by Roger Ernest Dion Sharpley
