= Austin Hodson =

British bishop

- Bishop of Tewkesbury
- Diocese: Diocese of Gloucester
- In office: 1938–1955
- Successor: Edward Henderson
- Other posts: Canon of Gloucester (1934–1961); Archdeacon of Gloucester (1938–1948)

Orders
- Ordination: 1906 (deacon); 1908 (priest) by Edgar Gibson (Gloucester)
- Consecration: 1938 by Cosmo Lang (Canterbury)

Personal details
- Born: 6 May 1879
- Died: 28 January 1961 (aged 81)
- Denomination: Anglican
- Parents: John & Annie
- Education: Christ Church, Oxford

Augustine John Hodson (called Austin; 6 May 1879 – 28 January 1961) was the first Bishop of Tewkesbury (suffragan bishop in the Diocese of Gloucester) from 1938 until his resignation in 1955.

Son of John and Annie, Hodson was educated at Lichfield Grammar School and Christ Church, Oxford. He studied for ordination at St Stephen's House, Oxford, and never married.

He was made deacon in Advent 1906 (23 December), by Edgar Gibson, Bishop of Gloucester, at Gloucester Cathedral, and ordained priest in 1908, serving his curacy at All Saints', Cheltenham. Between 1911 and 1915 he was Assistant Missioner to the Gloucester Diocesan Mission before serving Leckhampton as curate-in-charge (1915–1921); during the latter he was also a temporary chaplain (1918–1920). He had been interviewed by the Chaplain-General in July 1918, was described as 'Dark, keen... good' and sent to France to work in a Casualty Clearing Station. Before he was demobilised, it was reported, 'Has done good work as hospital chaplain in spite of rather poor health'. He moved in 1921 to become Vicar of Chalford, then of Wotton-under-Edge from 1924.

Hodson departed Wotton in 1934 to become a canon residentiary of Gloucester Cathedral, in which post he remained until death. During that time, he was Archdeacon of Gloucester (1938–1948) and Bishop of Tewkesbury — the first suffragan bishop of the diocese (1938–1955). He was consecrated a bishop on 24 February 1938 (the Feast of St Matthias), by Cosmo Lang, Archbishop of Canterbury, at Lambeth Palace chapel; and resigned the See effective 31 March 1955. His younger brother was Robert, Bishop suffragan of Shrewsbury.

Church of England titles
New title	Bishop of Tewkesbury; 1938–1955	Succeeded by Edward Henderson
