= Phil Andrew =

English Anglican priest

- Archdeacon of Cheltenham
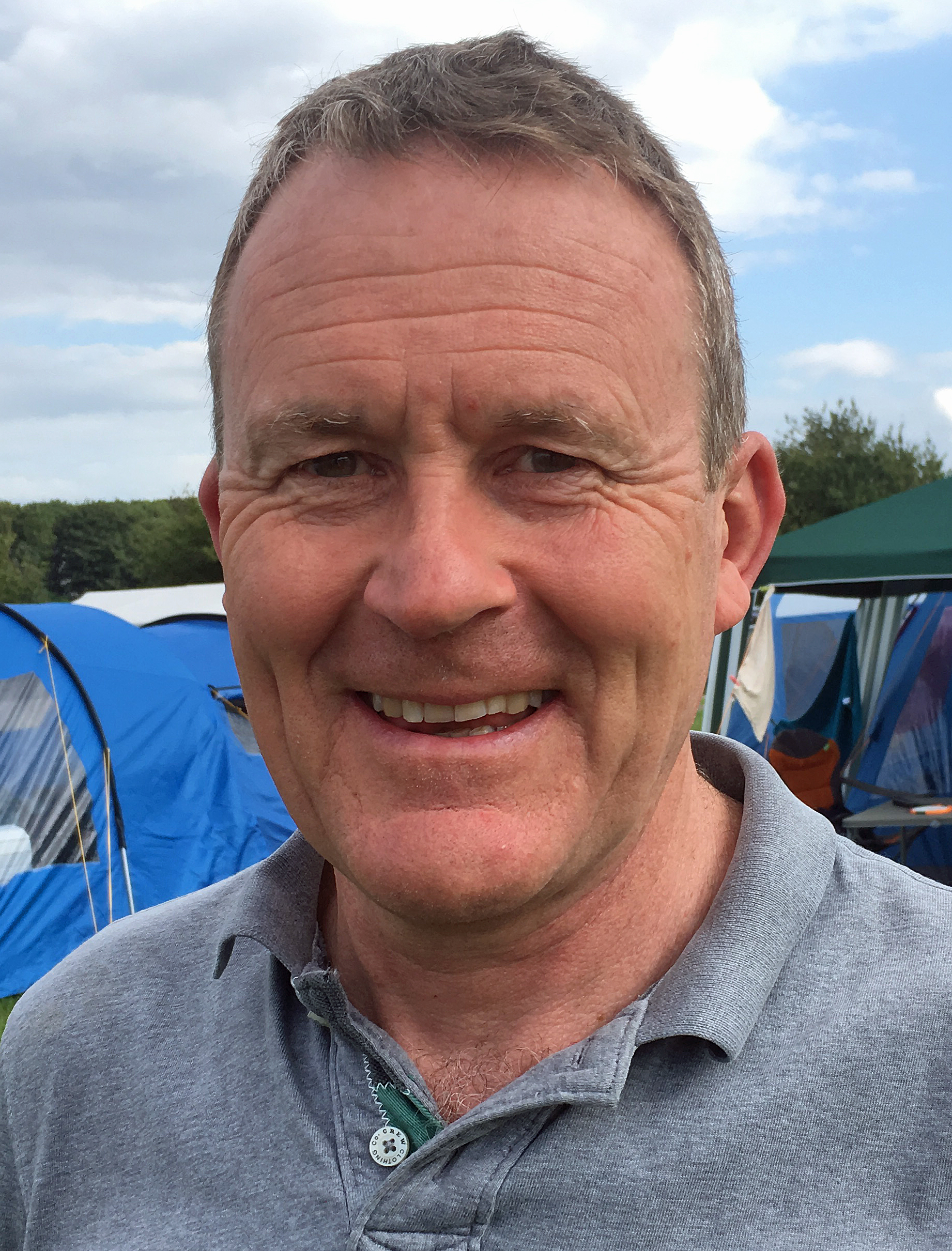
- Phil Andrew
- Diocese: Diocese of Gloucester
- In office: March 2017 – 31 December 2024
- Predecessor: Robert Springett

Personal details
- Born: 4 December 1962 (age 63) Eldoret, Kenya
- Denomination: Anglican

Philip John Andrew (born 4 December 1962, Eldoret, Kenya) is an English Anglican priest who served as Archdeacon of Cheltenham from 17 March 2017 until his resignation at the end of 2024.

Andrew was educated at King Edward's School, Witley, the University of Nottingham and St John's College, Nottingham; and ordained in 2003. After a curacy at Greyfriars Church, Reading, he was Vicar of St Mary Magdalene, Reigate from 2006 until his appointment as Archdeacon of Cheltenham.

In September 2024, it was announced that Andrew intended to resign his archdeaconry effective 31 December 2024.

== Notes ==
Church of England titles
Preceded by Robert Springett	Archdeacon of Cheltenham; 2017–2024	TBA
