= Edward Henderson (bishop) =

English bishop (1910–1986)

The Rt Rev Edward Barry Henderson DSC (22 March 1910 – 12 June 1986) was an Anglican cleric who was Bishop of Tewkesbury from 1955–60 and Bishop of Bath and Wells from 1960–75.

The son of Edward Henderson, former Dean of Salisbury, Henderson was born in Derby and educated at Radley and Trinity College, Cambridge (BA 1931, MA 1942). He trained for ordination at Cuddesdon College and was ordained deacon in 1934 and priest in 1935.

After a curacy in Pimlico at St Gabriel's, Warwick Square (1934-35) and Curate-in-charge at All Saints, Grosvenor Road (1936-39) he was Rector of Holy Trinity, Ayr from 1939 until 1947 (a period which encompassed wartime service in the RNVR). He was awarded the DSC in 1944. He was then Vicar of St Paul's Church, Knightsbridge from 1947 until his elevation to the suffragan bishopric of Tewkesbury in 1955, translation to Bath See following in 1960. He was consecrated a bishop on 11 June 1955, by Geoffrey Fisher, Archbishop of Canterbury, at St Paul's Cathedral. After 15 years at Bath, he resigned to begin retirement in Somerset.

Church of England titles
| Preceded by Augustine John Hodson | Bishop of Tewkesbury; 1955 – 1960 | Succeeded by Forbes Trevor Horan |
| Preceded by Harold William Bradfield | Bishop of Bath and Wells; 1960 – 1975 | Succeeded by John Monier Bickersteth |
