= John Mort =

Anglican bishop in Nigeria

John Ernest Llewelyn Mort, CBE (13 April 1915 – 30 July 1997) was an Anglican clergyman who served as Bishop of Northern Nigeria in the third quarter of the twentieth century.

Mort was educated at Malvern, St Catharine's College, Cambridge and Westcott House, Cambridge; and ordained deacon in 1940 and priest in 1941. After a curacy in Dudley, Worcestershire, he was the Diocese of Worcester's youth organiser from 1944 to 1948. He was also private chaplain to William Wilson Cash, the Bishop of Worcester, from 1943 to 1952; and vicar of Bedwardine from 1948 to 1952.

He was the first Bishop of the newly created diocese of Northern Nigeria from 1952 to 1969.

From 1970 until 1988 he was a residentiary canon and the treasurer) of Leicester Cathedral; and from 1972 an assistant bishop in the Diocese of Leicester.

His Times obituary described him as

"a warm, friendly guileless man whose great strengths were pastoral care and administrative skill"
