= John Went =

English bishop (born 1944)

- former Bishop of Tewkesbury
- Church: Church of England
- Diocese: Diocese of Gloucester
- Installed: 1996
- Term ended: 2 March 2013 (retired)
- Predecessor: Jeremy Walsh
- Successor: Martyn Snow
- Other post: Archdeacon of Surrey (1989–1996)

Orders
- Ordination: 29 September 1969 (deacon); 29 September 1970 (priest) by Robert Stopford (deacon); Graham Leonard (priest)
- Consecration: 25 January 1996 by George Carey

Personal details
- Born: 11 March 1944 (age 82)
- Denomination: Anglican
- Spouse: Rosemary Dunn (m. 1968)
- Education: Corpus Christi College, Cambridge

John Stewart Went (born 11 March 1944) was the Anglican Bishop of Tewkesbury, the suffragan bishop in the Diocese of Gloucester, from 25 January 1996 until 2 March 2013.

He was educated at Colchester Royal Grammar School and Corpus Christi College, Cambridge. He was made deacon at Michaelmas 1969 (29 September), by Robert Stopford, Bishop of London, at St Paul's Cathedral, and ordained priest the Michaelmas following (29 September 1970), by Graham Leonard, Bishop of Willesden, at St Mary's, Willesden. Went married Rosemary Dunn in 1968 before embarking on a clerical career with a curacy in Northwood, London followed by an incumbency at Margate. Vice-principal of Wycliffe Hall, Oxford from 1983 until 1989 when he became Archdeacon of Surrey. In 1996 he became the suffragan Bishop of Tewkesbury; he was consecrated a bishop on 25 January 1996 by George Carey, Archbishop of Canterbury, at Westminster Abbey.

== Styles ==
- The Reverend John Went (1969–1989)
- The Venerable John Went (1989–1996)
- The Right Reverend John Went (1996–present)

Church of England titles
Preceded by Jeremy Walsh	Bishop of Tewkesbury; 1996–2013	Succeeded by Martyn Snow
