= King Edward VI School, Lichfield =

King Edward VI School
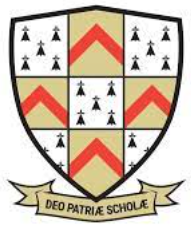

Location
- Upper St John Street; Lichfield, Staffordshire, WS14 9EE; England
- 52°40′34″N 1°49′22″W

Information
- Type: Community school
- Motto: Deo Patriae Scholae; For God, Country, and School
- Established: 1495; 531 years ago
- Local authority: Staffordshire
- Department for Education URN: 124408 Tables
- Ofsted: Reports
- Headteacher: C Forster
- Gender: Co-educational
- Age: 11 to 18
- Enrolment: 1430
- Houses: Addison, Clinton, Darwin and Garrick
- Website: http://www.keslichfield.org.uk

King Edward VI School, Lichfield, is a co-educational comprehensive secondary school and sixth form located near the heart of the city of Lichfield, Staffordshire, England. It is a community school maintained by Staffordshire Education Authority and admits pupils from the age of 11 (Year 7), with most electing to continue their education into the sixth form, leaving at 18 (Year 13). In the main school (Years 7–11), the published admissions number is 250 pupils for each year group. In total there are in excess of 1600 pupils on roll.

In 1995, the school celebrated its 500th anniversary, its Quincentenary. During its long history the school has educated some famous names, most notably Samuel Johnson.

== History ==
In 1495 Bishop Smythe established the school as a free grammar school as part of the same foundation as St. John's Hospital, a home for the elderly. Every day prayers are said for the school in the tiny chapel which forms part of the St. John's almshouses in St. John's Street. The school takes its name from the Tudor boy king who reigned between 1547 and 1553. The school crest incorporates features of the royal Tudor coat of arms. The Latin inscription beneath, "Deo, Patriae, Scholae", is broadly translated as "for God, Country, and School".

In the 18th century a number of eminent people were educated at the school. These included the great writer and lexicographer, Dr. Samuel Johnson (the buildings of the former grammar school bear his name), David Garrick, the actor, and Joseph Addison, the essayist and politician. Two of the school's four houses are named after Addison and Garrick. (The other houses are named after Roger de Clinton who founded a priory in Lichfield in the 12th century and Erasmus Darwin, who lived in the City for a number of years).

Until the beginning of the twentieth century the school occupied the school house in St. John's Street, opposite St. John's Hospital. It can still be seen, now forming part of the District Council premises. In 1903 the first building on the present site was opened. Further extensions were added in the 1920s and 1950s to what has come to be known as Johnson Hall.

King Edward VI School was also linked to the last State boarding school in the Staffordshire area. From 1953 to 1981 it was linked to Maple Hayes boarding school which housed up to 70 boys. Maple Hayes was purchased by Staffordshire council in 1951 after being sold by the Worthington family and officially opened as a boarding school on 18 November 1953. Boys would walk the 3.1 miles to King Edward VI school each day and board at Maple Hayes. It closed as a boy's boarding school in 1981 ending a 200 year history of State boarding schools in the Staffordshire area.

=== Recent developments ===
The present King Edward VI School was created in 1971 by the merger of the grammar school with Kings Hill secondary modern school which had been built on an adjacent site in the 1950s to cater for the City's expanding population. The premises of the former Kingshill School are referred to as Bader Hall in recognition of Douglas Bader, the World War II fighter ace, who opened that school in 1959. The original grammar school area is referred to as 'Johnson' after Dr Samuel Johnson, the famous British author who was educated at the school and lived in Lichfield for a time.

In 2008 a new music block built was built which includes state of the art rooms and an ecological design. Around the same time a new sixth form block was built where sixth form students can relax and socialise. It also contains four class rooms used exclusively for sixth form lessons.

== Notable former pupils ==
Since the merger

- Helen Baxendale, actress
- Ben Sharpe, Olympian, Sydney 2000
- Simon Smith (rugby union), Cambridge University, Wasps RUFC & England Rugby Union

As a grammar school

- Paul Addison, historian
- Elias Ashmole
- John Everard, Ambassador from 2006-8 to the Democratic People's Republic of Korea (North Korea), and from 2001-5 to Uruguay
- Admiral Sir Frederic Fisher CVO, younger brother of John Fisher, 1st Baron Fisher
- Very Rev Christopher George Hardwick, Dean of Truro since 2005
- Rt Rev Augustine John Hodson, Bishop of Tewkesbury from 1938–55
- Robert James
- Samuel Johnson
- Lt Gen Louis Lillywhite CB MBE, Surgeon General, Ministry of Defence from 2006-9
- Robin Marlar, Captain from 1955-9 of Sussex County Cricket Club, President from 2005-6 of the Marylebone Cricket Club (MCC), and Cricket Correspondent from 1970-96 of The Sunday Times
- Leslie Megahey, film director, and Head of Arts and Music from 1988-91 at BBC TV

== See also ==
- List of the oldest schools in the United Kingdom
