= Harold Bradfield =

British Anglican bishop

Harold Bradfield

Harold William Bradfield (20 September 1898 – 1 May 1960) was an Anglican bishop who served as Bishop of Bath and Wells from 1946 to 1960.

Harold was born in Lambeth, an only child whose father was a 'Club and Smoking Room worker'. He was at school at Dulwich College, and was 18 when he joined the City of London Yeomanry and the Army Cyclist Corps. He served in France in 1918-19 and, after the Great War ended, he was awarded the Victory and British War Medals. In 1922, he completed a Bachelor of Divinity degree at King's College, London, and was ordained and served in Lancashire as a curate and Vicar of St Mark's, Heyside. In 1934, he was appointed Secretary of the Canterbury Diocesan Board of Finance and in 1942, Archdeacon of Croydon. Bradfield had been considered for bishoprics including Croydon in 1942, but concerns were expressed about his health because of over-exertion. Nevertheless, his reputation as 'one of the ablest and most clearheaded men in administration and finance' was emphasised by the Archbishop of Canterbury to the new prime minister, Clement Attlee, who was the key figure in the appointment process, and Bradfield was offered the bishopric of Bath and Wells. He remained in post until his death in 1960, the last in a series of bouts of ill-health. He gained national fame in 1953 when he was one of the Queen's supporters at her coronation. The occasion was one of the first major outside broadcasts, and Bradfield's distinctive spectacles and dark hair can be seen to the Queen's left, with Michael Ramsey of Durham, a future Archbishop of Canterbury, to her right. Unusually for a Bishop of a major diocese in England in the 1949s and 1950s, Bradfield was not from a middle-class family nor had an Oxbridge degree. His success in the Church of England resulted from his own considerable strengths, particularly in the field of administration.

Church of England titles
Preceded by William Wand	Bishop of Bath and Wells; 1946 – 1960	Succeeded by Edward Henderson
