= Clive Young =

Church of England bishop

The Right Reverend Clive Young
- Bishop of Dunwich
- Church: Church of England
- Diocese: Diocese of St Edmundsbury and Ipswich
- In office: c. 1999 – 2013
- Predecessor: Tim Stevens
- Successor: Mike Harrison
- Other post: Archdeacon of Hackney (1992–1999)

Orders
- Ordination: 1972 (deacon); 1973 (priest)
- Consecration: 24 June 1999

Personal details
- Born: 31 May 1948
- Died: 7 October 2015 (aged 67)
- Buried: Dore Abbey, Herefordshire
- Denomination: Anglican
- Education: St John's College, Durham

Clive Young (31 May 1948 – 7 October 2015) was a Church of England bishop. From 1999 to 2013, he was the Anglican Bishop of Dunwich, a suffragan bishop in the Diocese of St Edmundsbury and Ipswich.

== Early life ==
Young was educated at King Edward VI Grammar School, Chelmsford. He then studied at St John's College, Durham and graduated in 1970 with a Bachelor of Arts (BA) degree. He then entered Ridley Hall, Cambridge, an Anglican theological college, to prepare for ordination.

== Ordained ministry ==
Young was ordained a deacon in 1972 and began his career with a curacy at Neasden (1972-1975), followed by a second curacy at St Paul's Hammersmith (1975-1979). He was then Priest in charge of Old Ford, London, latterly also Area Dean of Tower Hamlets; and then Vicar of St Andrew, Holborn and Archdeacon of Hackney.

In 1999, he was consecrated to the episcopate. From 1999 until his retirement on 12 May 2013, he was the Anglican Bishop of Dunwich, a suffragan bishop in the Diocese of St Edmundsbury and Ipswich. He then retired from full-time ministry and was appointed an honorary assistant bishop in the Diocese of Hereford.

He was a member of the Hymn Society of Great Britain and Ireland, acting as its conference chaplain in 2001.

== Personal life ==
In his spare time he was a keen gardener.

Young died on 7 October 2015. His funeral took place at Dore Abbey in Abbey Dore, Golden Valley, Herefordshire. He is buried in the Abbey's churchyard.

== Styles ==
- The Reverend Clive Young (1972–1992)
- The Venerable Clive Young (1992–1999)
- The Right Reverend Clive Young (1999–2015)

Church of England titles
Preceded by Tim Stevens	Bishop of Dunwich; 1999–2013	Succeeded by Mike Harrison
