= Archdeacon of Hackney =

Church of England ecclesiastical office

The Archdeacon of Hackney is a senior Anglican priest serving the diocese of London, responsible for the disciplinary and pastoral supervision of the clergy within its three area deaneries: Hackney, Islington, and Tower Hamlets.

Created from the archdeaconry of London by Order-in-Council on 2 March 1951, the archdeaconry originally comprised the rural deaneries of Bethnal Green, Hackney, Stoke Newington, Islington, Poplar, and Stepney.

== List of archdeacons ==
Anglican Archdeacon heraldic ornaments

- 1951 – 1971 (resigned): Michael Hodgins
- 1971 – 1981 (retired): George Timms (then Archdeacon Emeritus)
- 1981 – 1992 (resigned): Roger Sharpley
- 1992 – 1999 (translated): Clive Young (then Bishop of Dunwich)
- 1999 – 2010 (retired): Lyle Dennen
- 2011 – 2015 (translated): Rachel Treweek (then Bishop of Gloucester)
- 2015 – 2016 (acting): Jonathan Brewster
- 5 April 2016 – 13 August 2021 (resigned): Liz Adekunle
- 10 April 2022 – present: Peter Farley-Moore
