= King Edward's School, Witley =

King Edward's Witley

Location
- Petworth Road; Wormley, Surrey, GU8 5SG; England; 51.137365°N 0.644500°W

Information
- Type: Public school day and boarding school
- Motto: "United by Diversity since 1553"
- Religious affiliation: Church of England
- Established: 1553; 473 years ago
- Founder: King Edward VI
- Local authority: Surrey
- President: The Duchess of Gloucester
- Head: Joanna Wright
- Staff: c.60 teaching
- Gender: Mixed
- Age: 11 to 18
- Enrolment: c.400
- Campus size: 100 acres
- Houses: 8 Houses
- Colours: Blue and Navy
- Publication: Kestrel
- Former pupils: Old Witleians
- Website: http://www.kesw.org

King Edward's Witley is a co-educational boarding and day public school, founded in 1553 by King Edward VI and Nicholas Ridley, Bishop of London and Westminster, in The Palace of Bridewell near Fleet St in the City of London. The School is located in the village of Wormley (near Witley), Surrey, England, having moved to its present location in 1867. The School became fully co-educational in 1952. As of September 2010, the school has joined the small number of independent schools in the UK which offer the IB Diploma Programme in place of A-Levels in the sixth form. The school re-introduced A-levels as part of the curriculum from September 2015.

== History ==
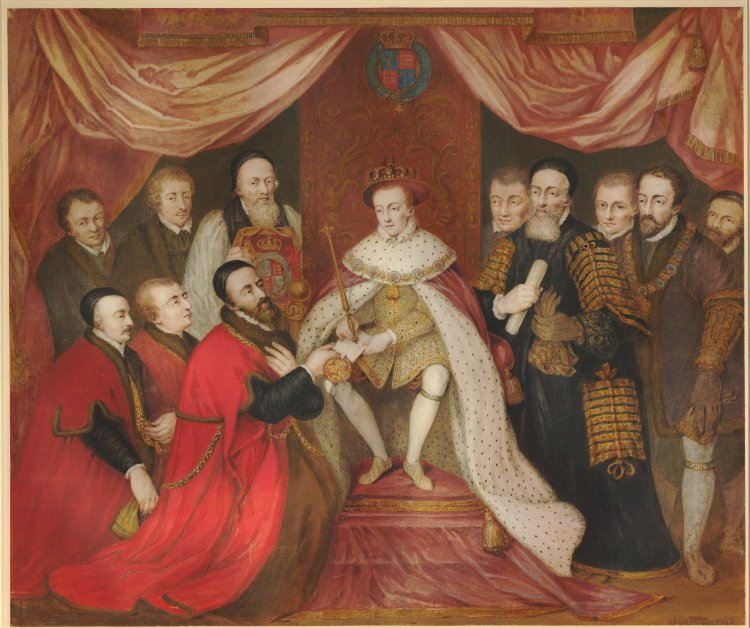
King Edward VI, the school's founder, awarding the charter to the Lord Mayor of London, Sir George Barne. Watercolour by George Vertue, 1750. British Museum, London.

The school was founded in 1553 as Bridewell Hospital, after Nicholas Ridley petitioned Edward VI to give some of his empty palaces over to the City of London (governed by the City of London Corporation) to house homeless women and children. The school's creation was sanctioned by the same royal charter of 1553 (26 June, 7 Edw. VI) as that of Christ's Hospital and St Thomas' Hospital, with the three institutions using the same coat of arms, although slightly modified by the latter.

In 1867 the school moved from the City of London to its present location in Surrey, at the same time adopting the current name. In common with other large building located outside of urban areas, the school installed its own gasworks.

The school was commandeered by the Royal Navy during the Second World War to test and develop the use of radar. This is remembered with a plaque in the central area, a junction of corridors known as 'Piccadilly'. The president of Bridewell Royal Hospital (the title was kept after the move of location) is now Birgitte, Duchess of Gloucester, appointed from 1 January 2006. Queen Elizabeth The Queen Mother held the title from 1953 to 2002. The school maintains strong links with the City of London, and is still supported by it in funding some bursaries. As of the academic year 2021/22 Senior School day fees are £20,520 per year, with senior school boarding fees £38,874 per year, though a number of bursaries and scholarships are available.

The school was in the news in April 2015 when Edward Moore, a choirmaster, was convicted of inappropriate sexual conduct with a girl student and jailed for nine months, despite Moore having been warned by the school's headteacher, deputy headteacher, and the pupil’s boarding tutor, to end all contact with her. Moore continued to meet her privately despite the warnings, ultimately having sex with the pupil in his office before cutting contact with her.

In July 2019, the Department for Education requested an unannounced additional visit by the Independent Schools Inspectorate to check the School's compliance with legal regulations and standards. The School was judged not to be meeting regulations including those relating to safeguarding. In February 2020, the school underwent an unannounced progress monitoring visit in order to check if the School had fully implemented the plans set out following the visit in July 2019. The findings of the inspection were that the school met the required standards for the regulations that were the main focus of the visit. The School met all of the requirements of the Education (Independent School Standards) Regulation 2014 "National Minimum Standards for Boarding Schools", and no further action was required as a result of the visit.

== Houses ==
There are seven senior Houses in total, four male, two female and one mixed house. The Houses at the School are paired, and, in the case of the senior pupils, conjoined in the centre of the buildings. This central area allows the boys and girls from the paired Houses to meet in the evenings and during spare time. The Lower School pupils board in Queen Mary House (QMH) where there are shared communal areas and separate sleeping quarters.

The senior Houses were built in the 1970s, and the plans can be seen in the school museum, housed in the History Department. Boarders moved into these new buildings in fall 1976 and the inauguration was commemorated by a visit from Queen Elizabeth The Queen Mother.

The school recently renovated some of the Senior Houses. Ridley relocated next to Grafton.

Ridley's relocation left 'Old Ridley' and St Bridget's empty and in 2021 work began on re-purposing these houses into a day-and-boarding, mixed house reserved for Upper Sixth pupils. In October 2022 Jubilee House was officially opened by Alderman Sir Peter Estlin, former Head Boy.

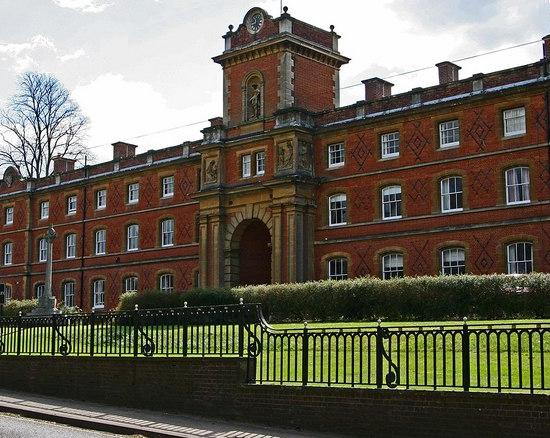
King Edward's School, as viewed from Petworth Road

=== Current houses ===
Juniors

- Queen Mary House - Queen Mary was president of the School from 1940 until 1953. It is known as QMH.

Seniors

- Wakefield – Named after Charles Wakefield, 1st Viscount Wakefield, president and benefactor from 1916 to 1940. This is a boys' house and is paired with Elizabeth.
- Elizabeth – Named After Queen Elizabeth the Queen Mother, president of Bridewell Royal Hospital from 1953 to 2002. She visited the School four times: in 1958, 1965, 1976 and 1991. This is a girls' house and is paired with Wakefield
- Edward – Named after King Edward VI, the founder. This is a boys' house and is paired with Tudor.
- Tudor – Named after The House of Tudor, the current royal family at the time of the School's founding. This is a girls' house and paired with Edward.
- Grafton – Named after Richard Grafton, MP, printer and historian. The first treasurer of Bridewell Royal Hospital. This is a boys' House and was formerly paired with St Bridget's but is now a bachelor House.
- Ridley – Named after bishop Nicholas Ridley, who preached to King Edward to request Bridewell Palace be given to the City of London for charitable purposes. This House was unused for a number of years, but re-opened in September 2013, having undergone extensive refurbishment. This is a boys' day house.
- Jubilee – Named in connection to the school's historic links with royalty. Jubilee House was set up to provide a bridge between school and the independent living found in university education. This house is a mixed house and is only for students in Upper Sixth.

=== Previous houses ===
Seniors

- Queens' - After the two queens who have been presidents (Mary and Elizabeth). This girls' House closed as of September 2019.
- St Bridget's – Saint Brigid of Kildare was a 5th-century Irish saint who is associated with a well which gave its name to the church of St. Bride and then to the palace, Bridewell Palace, built by Henry VIII. St Bridget's and 'Old Ridley' were renovated to create Jubilee House which opened in 2022.

== Notable Old Witleians ==
Former pupils of King Edward's are referred to as Old Witleians, or Old Wits.

- Phil Andrew - Archdeacon of Cheltenham
- Sally Bercow - wife of John Bercow, former Speaker of the House of Commons
- Ivor Caplin - Labour Member of Parliament
- Edd China - television presenter
- Sir Peter Estlin - 691st Lord Mayor of London
- Liz Gordon - New Zealand Member of Parliament
- Du'aine Ladejo - Olympic silver medallist
- Suphanat Minchainant - Thai Member of Parliament
- James Mullinger - comedian
- Mun Sung-hak - racing driver
- Toby Roberts - Olympic gold medallist at Paris 2024; the first British male climber to qualify for the Olympic Games
- Richard Short - actor
- Edward Tudor-Pole - musician and actor

== Heads ==
- Joseph Myall ( –1856)
- Edward Rudge (1856–1886)
- Gerard Mason (1886–1900)
- Charles Raynham (1900–1926)
- Alfred Bellerby (1926–1951)
- Gordon Humphreys
- John Hansford (1969–1980)
- Richard Wilkinson (1985–)
- Rodney Fox (1988–2000)
- Kerr Fulton-Peebles (2000–2010)
- John Attwater (2010–2019)
- Joanna Wright (2019– )

== Notable associations ==
Aerial view of King Edward's School

- Christopher Cocksworth - teacher (1981–1984)
- Caroline Cox, Baroness Cox – governor
- Birgitte, Duchess of Gloucester - patron
- John Palmer, 4th Earl of Selborne – treasurer (1972–1983)
- Samuel Pepys – governor in the 17th century
- Sir James Sanderson, 1st Baronet – president of Bridewell (1793–98)
- Sir John Stuttard - governor
