= Robert Deakin =

Thomas Carlyle Joseph Robert Hamish Deakin, known as Robert Deakin (1917–1985), was the Anglican Bishop of Tewkesbury from 1973 until his death in 1985.

He was born in the village of Parkend in The Forest of Dean, Gloucestershire, the son of Thomas Carlyle Deakin and Harriet Herries Deakin. His grandfather and his father had both been J.P.s and, at different times, managers of Parkend Colliery. When the mine closed, in 1944, his father trained to become an Anglican priest, eventually becoming rector of St Giles in Uley and Holy Cross in Owlpen, Gloucestershire.

Deakin was educated at Oxford and Wells Theological College before embarking on a curacy at Stroud, Gloucestershire (during which time he married Marion Dyer), the incumbency at Holy Trinity in Drybrook then St Mary's Charlton Kings and the Rural Deanship of Cheltenham in 1949 until his elevation to suffragan bishop of Tewkesbury in 1973. He died on 3 August 1985

== Notes ==
Church of England titles
Preceded by Forbes Trevor Horan	Bishop of Tewkesbury; 1973 – 1985	Succeeded by Jeremy Walsh
