= St James the Great, Colchester =

Church of St James the Great, Colchester
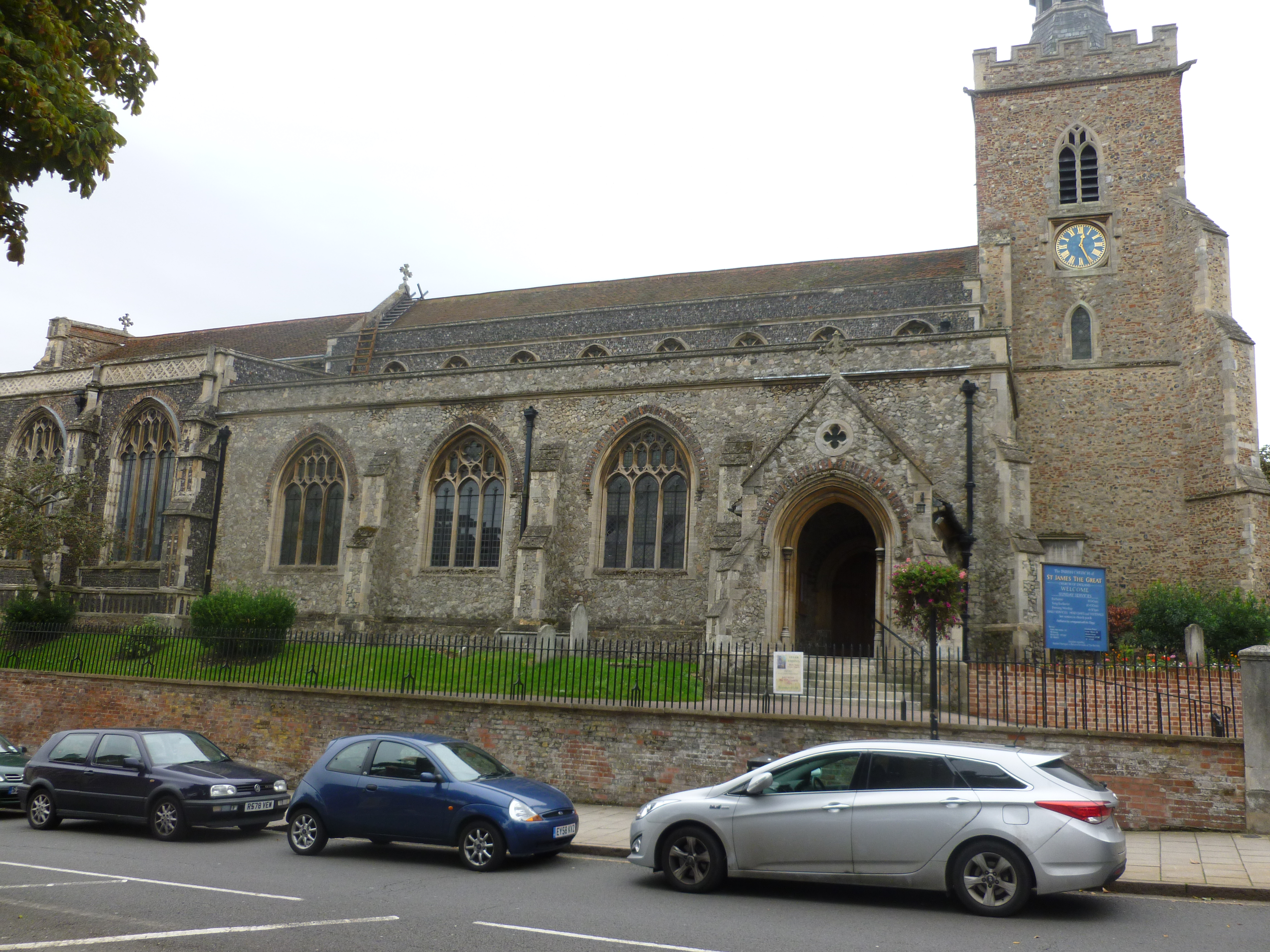
- Church of St James the Great, Colchester
- 51°53′23″N 0°54′26″E
- Location: East Hill, Colchester, Essex, CO1 2QL
- Country: England
- Denomination: Church of England
- Churchmanship: Traditional Catholic

History
- Status: Active

Architecture
- Functional status: Parish church
- Heritage designation: Grade II* listed

Administration
- Diocese: Diocese of Chelmsford
- Archdeaconry: Archdeaconry of Colchester
- Deanery: Colchester
- Parish: St. James and St. Paul Colchester

Clergy
- Bishop: The Rt Revd Norman Banks (AEO)

The Church of St James the Great is a Church of England parish church in Colchester, Essex. The church is a grade II* listed building.

== History ==
The church was originally built from the 13th to 15th centuries. It was restored from 1870 to 1871 by Samuel Sanders Teulon.

On 24 February 1950, the church was designated a grade II* listed building.

=== Present day ===
The Church of St James the Great is part of the Parish of St. James and St. Paul Colchester in the Archdeaconry of Colchester in the Diocese of Chelmsford.

The parish stands in Traditional Catholic tradition of the Church of England. As it rejects the ordination of women, the parish receives alternative episcopal oversight from the Bishop of Richborough (currently Norman Banks).

== Notable people ==
- Robert Springett, later Bishop of Tewkesbury, served his curacy here

== Gallery ==
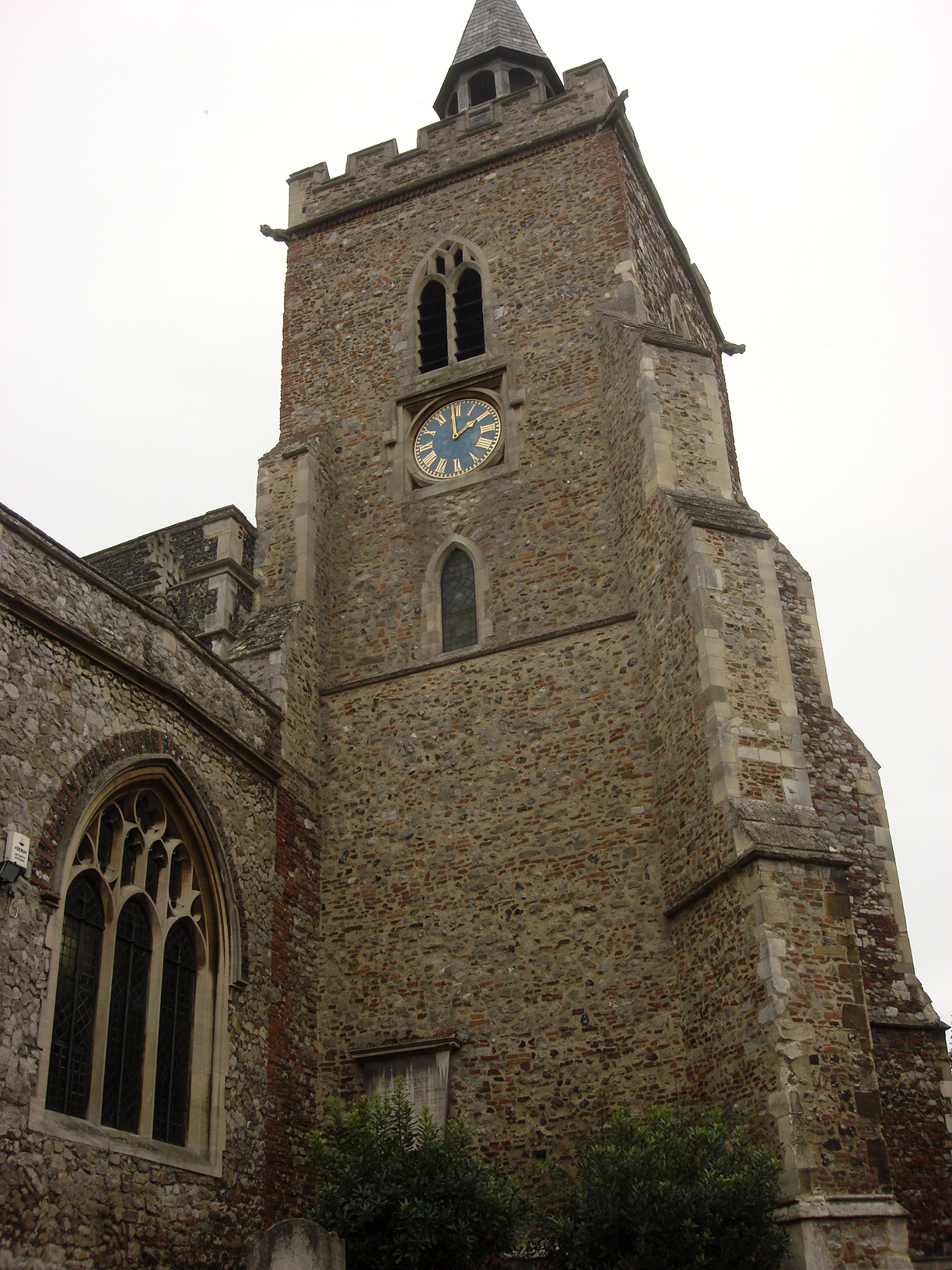
Tower

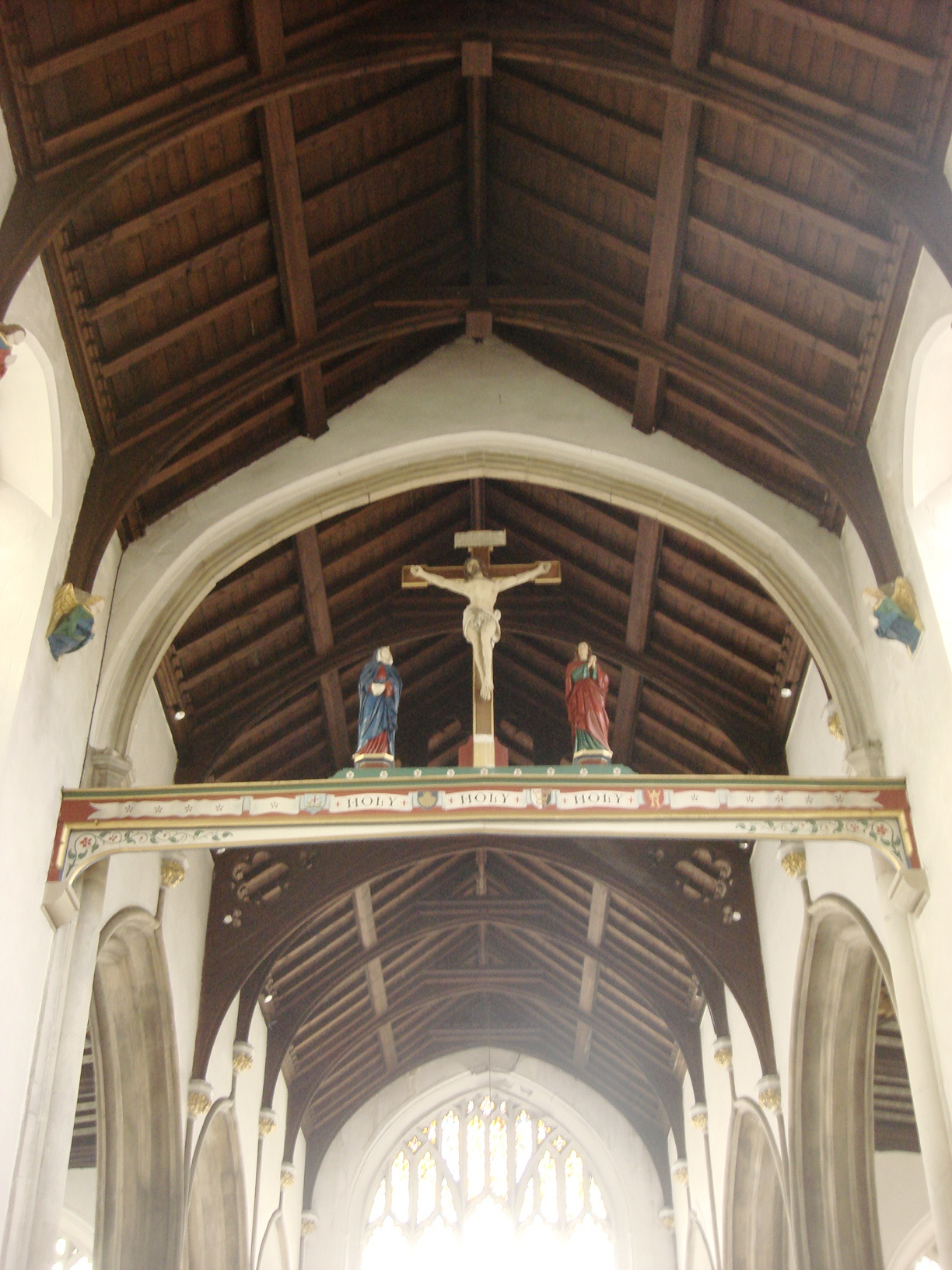
Rood beam

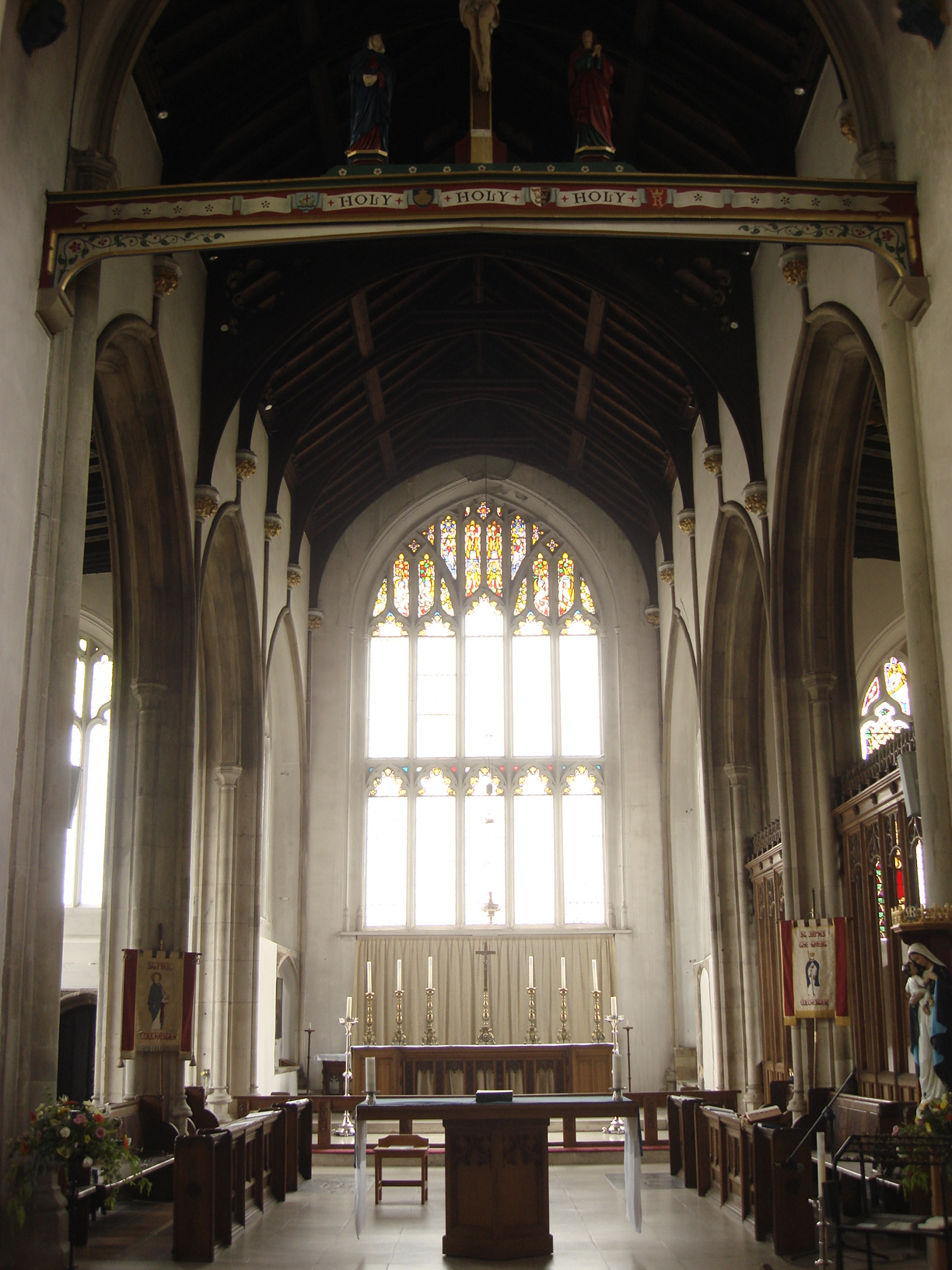
Chancel
