= Tim Stevens =

Retired British Anglican bishop (born 1946)

The Right Reverend Tim Stevens CBE GCStJ
- Bishop of Leicester
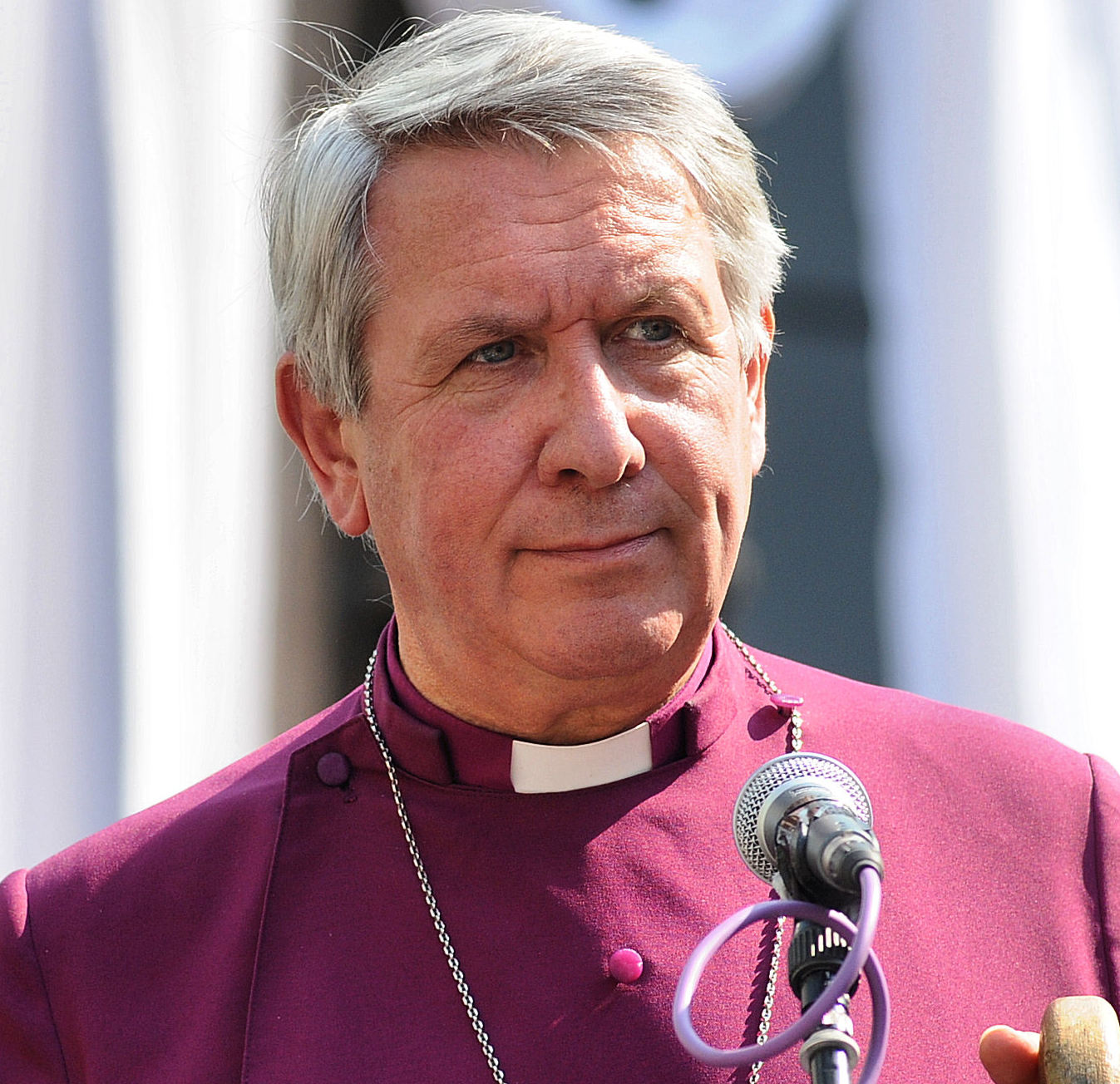
- Stevens in 2011
- Church: Church of England
- Diocese: Diocese of Leicester
- In office: 1999 – 11 July 2015 (retired)
- Predecessor: Tom Butler
- Successor: Martyn Snow
- Other posts: Bishop of Dunwich (1995–1999); Convenor of the Lords Spiritual (November 2009 – May 2015)

Orders
- Ordination: 1976
- Consecration: 1995

Personal details
- Born: 31 December 1946 (age 79) Ilford, Essex, United Kingdom
- Denomination: Anglican
- Residence: Bishop's Lodge, Leicester
- Parents: Ralph Stevens & Ursula Plowman
- Spouse: Wendi Price (m. 1973)
- Children: 1 daughter, Rachel (deceased) & 1 son, Adam
- Education: Selwyn College, Cambridge

Convenor of the Lords Spiritual
- In office 1 November 2009 – 18 May 2015
- Preceded by: Office Established
- Succeeded by: David Urquhart

Member of the House of Lords
- Lord Spiritual
- Bishop of Leicester; 3 December 2003 – 31 August 2015

Timothy John Stevens, CBE, GCStJ (born 31 December 1946) is a retired British Anglican bishop. He was Bishop of Dunwich from 1995 to 1999 and was Bishop of Leicester from 1999 to 2015. From 2003 to 2015, he was a member of the House of Lords as a Lord Spiritual and served as Convenor of the Lords Spiritual from 2009 to 2015.

== Early life ==
Stevens was born in Ilford, Essex, to Ralph Stevens and Ursula Plowman. He was educated at Chigwell School. He studied classics and English at Selwyn College, Cambridge, and graduated with a Bachelor of Arts degree in 1968; as per tradition, this was promoted to a Master of Arts (MA (Cantab)) degree in 1972.

From 1968 to 1973, Stevens worked as a senior management trainee for British Overseas Airways Corporation (BOAC) and in 1972 and 1973 as a second secretary at the Foreign and Commonwealth Office.

== Ordained ministry ==
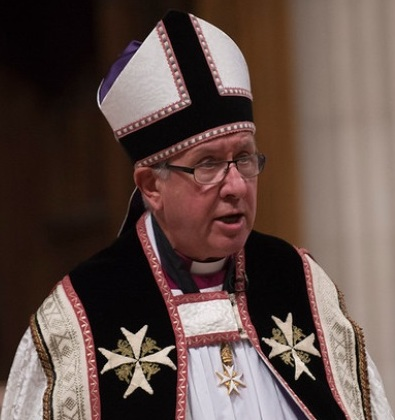
Bishop Stevens GCStJ, Prelate of the Venerable Order of St John

After Cambridge, Stevens studied at Ripon Hall, Oxford, where he gained a diploma in theology. He was ordained in 1976, becoming a curate in East Ham in the same year. From 1979 to 1980, he was Team Vicar of Upton Park and from 1980 to 1988 Team Rector of Canvey Island. He was the Bishop of Chelmsford's urban officer from 1988 to 1991 and the Archdeacon of West Ham from 1991 and 1995.

Stevens was consecrated a bishop by George Carey, Archbishop of Canterbury, at Southwark Cathedral on 17 November 1995; he became the Bishop suffragan of Dunwich in 1995 and occupied that See until 1999, when he was appointed as the Bishop of Leicester. It was announced on 18 November 2014 that Stevens was to retire in July 2015. On 11 July, he led his last service as Bishop of Leicester at Leicester Cathedral.

He took a seat in the House of Lords as one of the Lord Spiritual in 2003. He was the Convenor of the Lords Spiritual from November 2009 until May 2015. On 16 July 2015, he gave his last speech in the House of Lords. He was succeeded by the first female Lord Spiritual, Rachel Treweek, when parliament reconvened in the autumn.

Stevens was appointed Commander of the Order of the British Empire (CBE) in the 2016 Birthday Honours for services to the Church of England and the community in Leicestershire.

On 1 September 2016, he was appointed as the Prelate of the Most Venerable Order of the Hospital of Saint John of Jerusalem. On 11 February 2017, Stevens was one of fourteen retired bishops to sign an open letter to the then-serving bishops of the Church of England. In an unprecedented move, they expressed their opposition to the House of Bishops' report to General Synod on sexuality, which recommended no change to the Church's canons or practises around sexuality. By 13 February, a serving bishop (Alan Wilson, Bishop of Buckingham) and nine further retired bishops had added their signatures; on 15 February, the report was rejected by synod.

In January 2020, Stevens became interim Principal of Westcott House, Cambridge, where he had previously served as Chair of the Governing Body while a bishop. He was succeeded as Principal of Westcott House by Helen Dawes in 2021.

Stevens is currently Chair of the organisation, Common Purpose UK.

== Personal life ==
Stevens has been married to Wendi Kathleen Price since 1973. She died in May 2020. They had one daughter, now deceased, and have one son.

== Styles ==
- The Reverend Tim Stevens (1976–1991)
- The Venerable Tim Stevens (1991–1995)
- The Right Reverend Tim Stevens (1995—2016)
- The Right Reverend Tim Stevens CBE (2016–present)
