= Rachel Treweek =

British Anglican bishop and Lord Spiritual (born 1963)

The Right Reverend Rachel Treweek
- Bishop of Gloucester
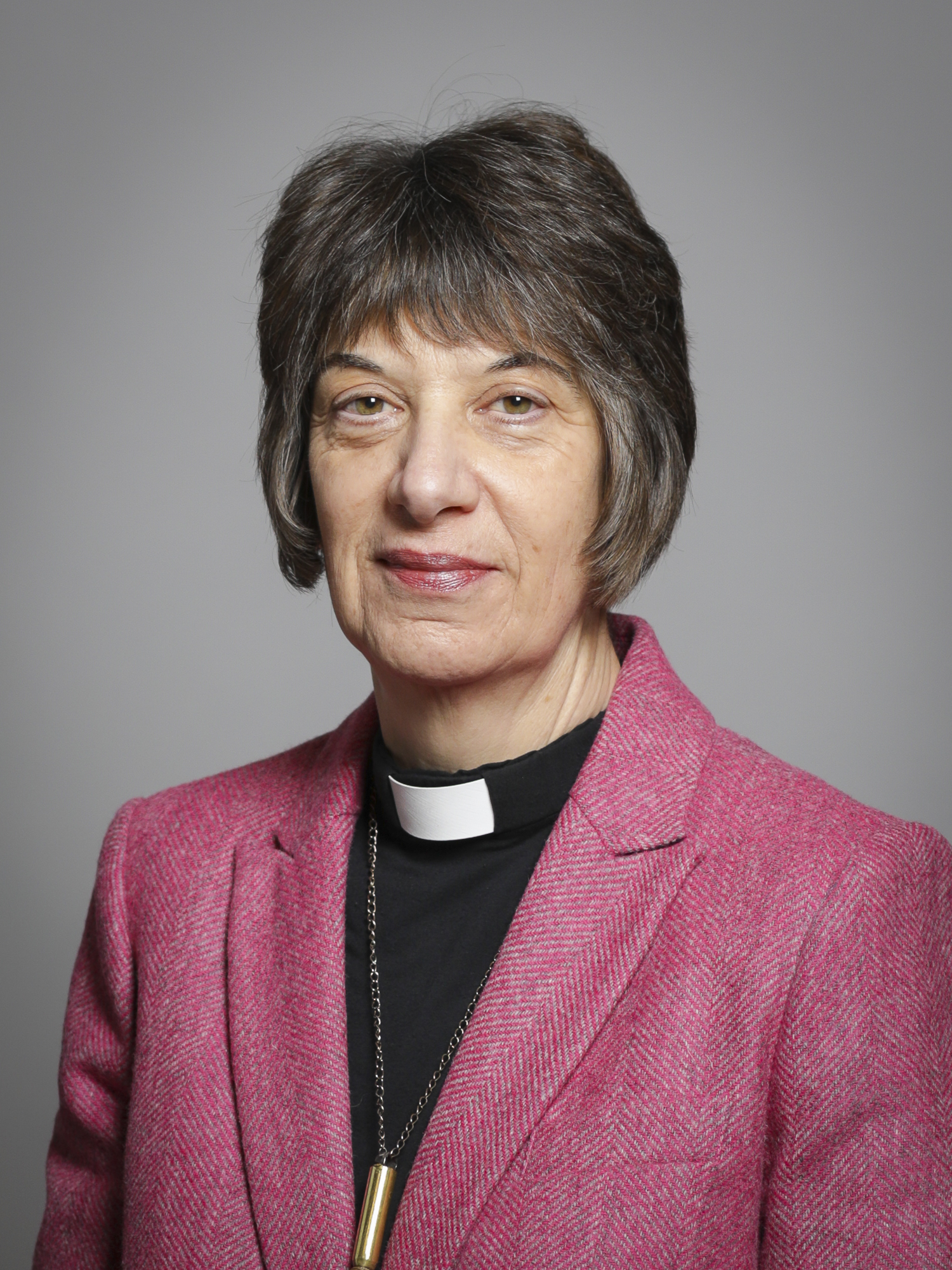
- Official portrait, 2019
- Church: Church of England
- Diocese: Diocese of Gloucester
- In office: 2015–present
- Predecessor: Michael Perham
- Other posts: Bishop to HM Prisons (2020–present); Lord Spiritual (2015–present)
- Previous posts: Archdeacon of Hackney (2011–2015); Archdeacon of Northolt (2006–2011)

Orders
- Ordination: 3 July 1994 (deacon) by David Hope; 27 June 1995 (priest) by Martin Wharton
- Consecration: 22 July 2015 by Justin Welby

Personal details
- Born: Rachel Montgomery; 4 February 1963 (age 63) Broxbourne, Hertfordshire, England
- Denomination: Anglican
- Residence: Bishopscourt, Gloucester
- Spouse: Guy Treweek (m. 2006)
- Profession: Former speech therapist; Former family therapist
- Education: University of Reading; Wycliffe Hall, Oxford

Member of the House of Lords
- Lord Spiritual
- Bishop of Gloucester; 26 October 2015

Rachel Treweek (née Montgomery; born 4 February 1963) is an English Anglican bishop who has served as Bishop of Gloucester since 2015 and is the joint third female bishop in the Church of England, and first female diocesan bishop. A former speech and language therapist, she was the archdeacon of Hackney in the Diocese of London from 2011 until 2015.

== Early life and career ==
Born Rachel Montgomery on 4 February 1963, she was educated at Broxbourne School, a state school in Broxbourne, Hertfordshire. She studied at the University of Reading, graduating in 1984 with a Bachelor of Arts (BA) degree in linguistics and language pathology.

Treweek's first career was as a speech and language therapist. After six years as a paediatric speech therapist in the National Health Service, she left her job to train for ordination in the Church of England.

== Ordained ministry ==
Treweek studied for ordained ministry at Wycliffe Hall, Oxford, an Anglican theological college, and graduated with a Bachelor of Theology (BTh) degree in 1994. She was made a deacon at Petertide 1994 (3 July), by David Hope, Bishop of London, at St Paul's Cathedral, and ordained a priest the following Petertide (27 June 1995), by Martin Wharton, Bishop of Kingston, at her title church. From 1994 to 1997, she served a curacy at St George and All Saints’ Church, Tufnell Park, London. She remained at St George and All Saints’ Church as the associate vicar from 1997 to 1999. In 1999, she was appointed Vicar of St James-the-Less, Bethnal Green, London. In addition to the incumbency, she was appointed the continuing ministerial education officer for the Diocese of London.

In 2006, Treweek left parish ministry on her appointment as the archdeacon of Northolt, one of six archdeacons in the Diocese of London. She held the position for five years before becoming the archdeacon of Hackney on 14 May 2011. She relinquished this appointment on confirmation of her appointment as Bishop of Gloucester on 15 June 2015.

In September 2013, Treweek was elected as one of eight "participant observers" of the House of Bishops representing the South East of England. Such observers were senior female priests who attended and participated in meetings of the House of Bishops until six women were sitting in the House by right as bishops. She attended her first meeting of the House of Bishops of the General Synod of the Church of England on 9 December 2013.

=== Episcopal ministry ===
On 26 March 2015, it was announced that Treweek was to become the next bishop of Gloucester, the diocesan bishop of the Diocese of Gloucester. Though there had been two women appointed bishops previously in the Church of England, she was the first woman to be appointed a diocesan rather than suffragan bishop. She was the first woman to become a bishop in the Province of Canterbury, jointly with Sarah Mullally, Bishop of Crediton. On 15 June 2015, her election was confirmed during a sitting of the Arches Court of Canterbury at St Mary-le-Bow, City of London. At this point, she legally became the bishop of Gloucester. On 22 July 2015, she was consecrated by Justin Welby, Archbishop of Canterbury, during a ceremony at Canterbury Cathedral, being the first woman to be consecrated as diocesan bishop in the Church of England. On 19 September 2015, she was installed at Gloucester Cathedral as the 41st Bishop of Gloucester.

Following the Lords Spiritual (Women) Act 2015, Treweek was the first woman bishop eligible to be admitted to the House of Lords as a Lord Spiritual when parliament reconvened in September 2015 after its summer recess, in place of Tim Stevens who had retired as Bishop of Leicester and Convenor of the Bishops in the Lords. She sent back the first version of her writ of summons because it referred to her as a "Right Reverend Father in God"—bishops' writs have simply omitted "Father in God" ever since, even for male bishops. Then, on 26 October 2015, she was introduced to the House by Justin Welby, Archbishop of Canterbury, and Richard Chartres, Bishop of London. In 2020, she became (additionally) Bishop to HM Prisons.

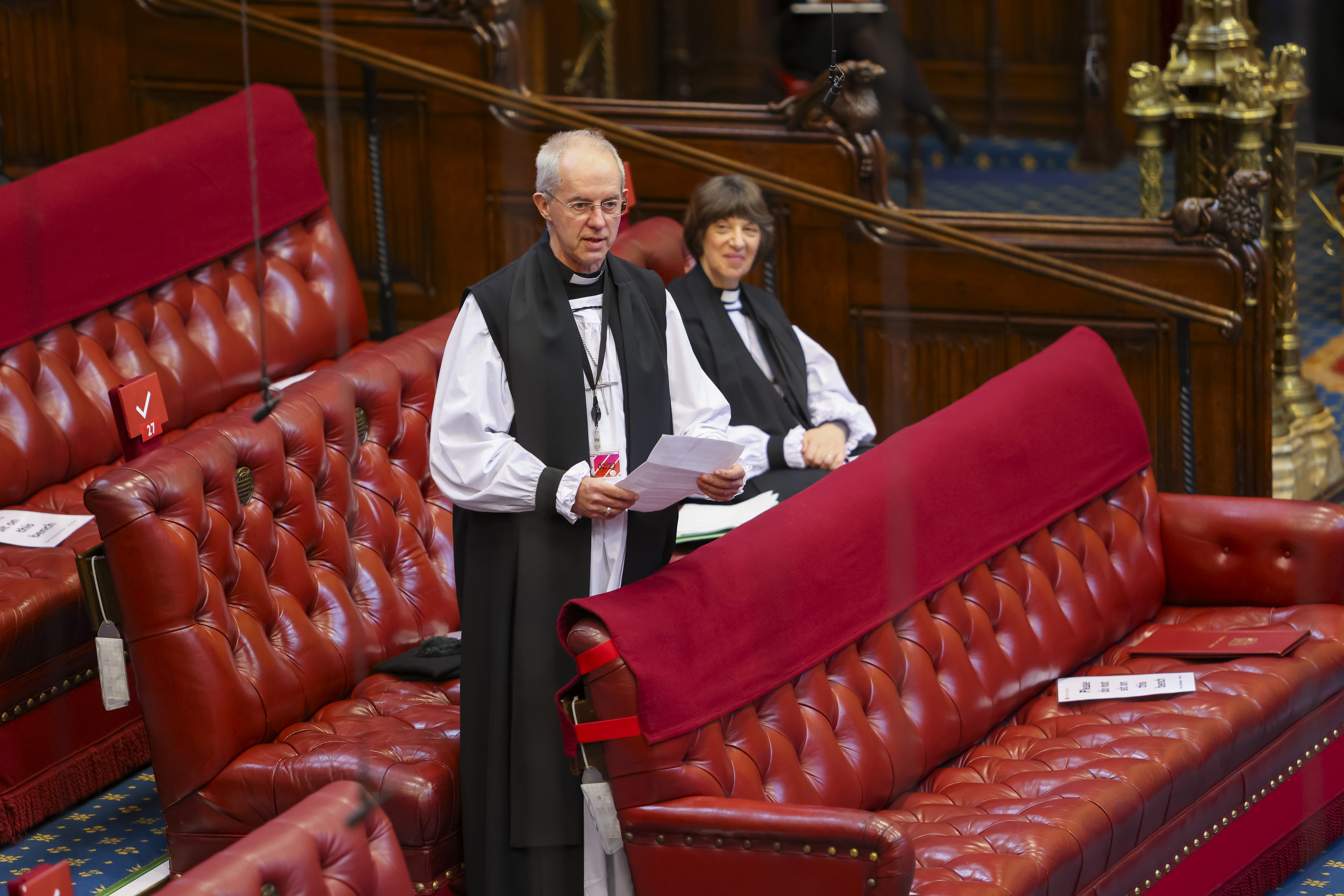
Treweek in the chamber of the House of Lords, observing Justin Welby, Archbishop of Canterbury speaking, 2021

== Theology and views ==
Treweek believes that God should be considered to be neither male nor female and tries to avoid using gender-specific pronouns when referring to God. Explaining this view to The Observer, she said she "personally prefers to say neither 'he' nor 'she', but 'God'. 'Sometimes I lapse, but I try not to.'" On 15 January 2016 Treweek presided at an LGBTI Eucharist with Inclusive Church.

In January 2023, she stated that she supported the celebration and blessing of "faithful monogamous same-sex relationships", but did not support changing the Church of England's doctrine of marriage as the life-long union of one man and one woman.

In November 2023, she was one of 44 Church of England bishops who signed an open letter supporting the use of the Prayers of Love and Faith (i.e. blessings for same-sex couples) and called for "Guidance being issued without delay that includes the removal of all restrictions on clergy entering same-sex civil marriages, and on bishops ordaining and licensing such clergy".

Following Justin Welby's decision in November 2024 to stand down as Archbishop of Canterbury due to his failing to act after becoming aware of child abuse by John Smyth, who was associated with the Church of England, Treweek said that resignation was the right thing to do, commented that the position was "very, very difficult ... stepping into the structures that do need to change", and said that the affair had shown the "very clunky governance we have within the Church of England ... We do not have quick decision making, there are too many different levels, groups, involved. We need to be able to move much more swiftly".

== Personal life ==
In 2006, she married Guy Treweek; he is a Church of England priest and was priest-in-charge of two ancient City of London parishes at the time of her appointment to the episcopate.

== Patronages ==
Treweek is a Patron of Prisoners Abroad, a charity supporting the welfare of Britons imprisoned overseas and their families as well as Marah Trust, who support vulnerable and marginalised people in the Stroud area.

== Honours ==
On 8 July 2016, Treweek received an honorary doctorate (Hon DLitt) from her alma mater, the University of Reading.

== Styles ==
- The Reverend Rachel Montgomery (1994 – March 2006)
- The Reverend Rachel Treweek (March – May 2006)
- The Venerable Rachel Treweek (May 2006 – 2015)
- The Right Reverend Rachel Treweek (since 2015)

Church of England titles
Preceded by Christopher Chessun	Archdeacon of Northolt; 2006–2011	Succeeded by Duncan Green
Preceded by Lyle Dennen	Archdeacon of Hackney; 2011–15 June 2015	Succeeded by Liz Adekunle
Preceded by Michael Perham	Bishop of Gloucester; 15 June 2015–present	Incumbent
