= Richard Calne =

- Education: University of Oxford
- Occupation: Canon of Lanthony Secunda
- Years active: c. 1412-c. 1421
- Known for: Manuscript collection

Richard Calne was a canon of Lanthony Secunda who studied at the University of Oxford from c. 1413 to c. 1421. He is known for his acquisition of nine manuscripts during his studies and was responsible for the final significant expansion of Lanthony Secunda's collection.

== Life ==
Little is known about Richard Calne beyond the evidence preserved in manuscripts owned by him. He was a canon of Lanthony Secunda and studied at the University of Oxford from 1412x1413 until at least 1421. The Oxford college he attended is unknown, and the Augustinian college of St Mary's was not founded until 1435.

In 1413, he was appointed proxy by John Wyche when Wyche was summoned by the prior of St Oswald. Kirsty Bennett interprets this appointment as evidence that he was a capable canon before his studies at Oxford.

The last record of Calne at Oxford was in 1421, when he pledged Lambeth Palace MS 141 to the common chest of the Austin Canons. This manuscript later entered Lanthony Secunda's library, indicating either that he redeemed the work quickly or remained at Oxford for some time after 1421. Bennett suggests that if he did return in 1421, his return may have been associated with Lanthony Secunda being entrusted with Carmarthen Priory.

== Manuscripts ==
Nine manuscripts can be connected with Richard Calne's time at Oxford, all of which were acquired by him during his studies. Their contents relate largely to the university curriculum of the period and include works unlikely otherwise to have been available in Lanthony Secunda's collection.

The manuscripts acquired by Calne probably entered Lanthony Secunda's collection when he returned during the 1420s. Only three other surviving manuscripts are known to have been acquired by the priory during the fifteenth century. He was responsible for the final significant expansion of the collection and Bennett presents him as an example of how the interests and activities of a single community member could have a substantial impact upon the community's library.

His manuscripts are valuable for the information they contain about their acquisition. Inscriptions record that Calne obtained them and how, and in some cases also provide the date of acquisition or identify a scribe. The chronology of these works may reflect his academic progress, but as Lanthony Secunda was not a wealthy foundation the acquisitions may instead have been opportunistic, with Calne limiting himself to essential or cheap works.

=== Acquisition and production ===
Calne began obtaining works soon after his arrival at Oxford, likely with funding from Lanthony Secunda. He did so through second-hand purchases, unredeemed pledges, commissioned copying, and his own scribal work. M. B. Parkes describes his methods as representative of how students of the period obtained works.

His second-hand purchases included Lambeth Palace MS 70 in 1413, Lambeth Palace MS 111 for 2s 6d in 1414, Lambeth Palace MS 97 for 3s in 1415, and Lambeth Palace MS 370 in 1418. He also purchased Lambeth Palace MS 74, probably in 1414, and folios 1-137 of Lambeth Palace MS 145 at an unknown date.

Calne also participated in the production of Lambeth Palace MS 393 and Lambeth Palace MS 396, copying some parts himself while commissioning other scribes to supply the remainder. Three scribes, including Calne himself, worked on LP 396. As Calne is known to be one of the scribes of LP 393, and there only appears to be a single hand in common between the manuscripts, it is likely that we can identify Calne's hand. About one-fifth of LP 393 and half of LP 396 are in his hand.

Bennett argues that it is unlikely that Calne copied these works solely to reduce costs, since in that case he likely would have copied them in their entirety. She proposes that he had possession of new works, and to accelerate the completion of his copy divided the scribal work and then bound the booklets together. The production of manuscripts from separately copied booklets was common by this period.

Lambeth Palace MS 141 may itself have reached Calne as an unredeemed pledge. It contains cautio entries from Turville's common chest dated 1409 and 1412 and had probably previously belonged to John Grandisson, bishop of Exeter, whose will provided books for poor theology students at Exeter College.

In addition to the works he acquired, Calne may have borrowed manuscripts from Lanthony Secunda for the duration of his studies. Lambeth Palace MS 83 contains two cautiones placing it with a canon of Lanthony at Oxford during Calne's stay there, while an end leaf bears the initials "R.C." in a hand resembling that found in other manuscripts connected to him. As MS 83 may have been held in Lanthony Secunda's collection in the fourteenth century, it is possible that Calne borrowed it for his studies. If this identification is correct, the manuscript places him at Oxford in 1412 and may have been temporarily pawned to fund Calne's initial living expenses.
