= Title (Christianity) =

In the Church of England, a priest cannot be ordained deacon until she/he has a church at which she/he can serve; she/he has to give its "title" in order to proceed. Thus he/she is said to "serve his[/her] title". This is also called a curacy, and he/she the (assistant) curate.
