= Bachelor of Theology =

Academic degree

The Bachelor of Theology degree (BTh, ThB, or BTheol) is a two- to five-year undergraduate degree or graduate degree in theological disciplines and is typically (but not exclusively) pursued by those seeking ordination for ministry in a church, denomination, or parachurch organization. Candidates for this degree typically must complete course work in Greek and (or) Hebrew, as well as systematic theology, biblical theology, ethics, homiletics, hermeneutics, counseling and Christian ministry. The Bachelor of Theology may include a thesis component and may consist of an additional year beyond the coursework requirements for the degrees of Bachelor of Religious Education and Bachelor of Arts. In some denominations, such as the Church of England or the Presbyterian Church in America, it is considered sufficient qualification for formal ordination.

== UK and Europe ==
In the United Kingdom and other European nations, the Bachelor of Theology is a two to five year degree for students pursuing ordination.

BTh is currently offered at:

- The University of Oxford as an undergraduate degree offered at two colleges
- The University of Cambridge as Bachelor of Theology for Ministry offered at five colleges
- Edinburgh Theological Seminary validated by the University of Glasgow
- University of Aberdeen as a distance learning degree
- South West Baptist College
- Cardiff Baptist College
- St Padarn's Institute for the Church in Wales, validated by University of Wales, Trinity Saint David
- St Patrick's College, Maynooth as a three-year, Level 8 degree
- Carmelite Institute of Britain and Ireland

== United States ==
Within the United States, the Bachelor of Theology (or Bachelor of Divinity) is generally identical in coursework and requirements to the Master of Divinity. More common than the Bachelor of Theology in the US are dual-degree programs where one may earn an undergraduate degree in Bible and(or) theology and a Master of Divinity simultaneously.

== Notable BTh graduates ==
- Rev. Canon Prof. Susan Gillingham
- Rachel Treweek, Bishop of Gloucester (2015–present)
- Rt Reverend Saju Muthulaly, Bishop of Loughborough (2022–present)
- Martyn Snow, Bishop of Tewkesbury (2013–2016), Bishop of Leicester (2016–present)
- Henry Richmond (bishop), Bishop of Repton (1985–1999)
- Ric Thorpe, Bishop of Islington (2015–present)
- David Hawkins (bishop), Bishop of Barking (2002–2014)
- Robert Springett, Bishop of Tewkesbury (2016–present)
- Simon Burton-Jones, Bishop of Tonbridge (2018–present)
- John McDowell (bishop), Archbishop of Armagh (2020–present)
- William Wright (Australian bishop), Bishop of the Roman Catholic Diocese of Maitland-Newcastle in Australia (2011–2021)
- Arthur Jeffery, Australian Methodist minister and renowned scholar of Middle Eastern languages and manuscripts

== See also ==
- Associate of Theology
- Bachelor of Divinity
- Bible College
- Ordination
- Licentiate in Theology
- Seminary
