= Bishop of Tewkesbury =

Anglican suffragan bishop in England

The Bishop of Tewkesbury is an episcopal title used by a suffragan bishop of the Church of England Diocese of Gloucester, in the Province of Canterbury, England. The title takes its name after the town of Tewkesbury in Gloucestershire, but the bishop's responsibilities cover the whole diocese. As with all suffragan sees, the need for the see of Tewkesbury is reconsidered every time it falls vacant. In both 2013 and 2016, the diocesan synod recommended that a new bishop be appointed, concluding that the need for a bishop was greater than ever.

The first Bishop of Tewkesbury, Austin Hodson, was consecrated on 24 February 1938, as a suffragan to the Bishop of Gloucester. The longest-serving bishop to date was John Went, who retired in 2013 after 17 years in post. The only bishop to have died in office was Robert Deakin, who died on 3 August 1985, aged 68.

The incumbent is Robert Springett, previously Archdeacon of Cheltenham, whose nomination to the Suffragan See of Tewkesbury was approved by the Queen on 25 July 2016. His consecration took place on 30 November.

== List of bishops ==
Bishops of Tewkesbury
From	Until	Incumbent	Notes
1938	1955	Austin Hodson	(1879–1961)
1955	1960	Edward Henderson	(1910–1986). Translated to Bath and Wells
1960	1973	Forbes Horan	(1905–1996)
1973	1985	Robert Deakin	(1917–1985). Formerly Vicar of St Mary's Charlton Kings and Rural Dean of Cheltenham. Consecrated 1973. Died in office 1985.
1986	1995	Jeremy Walsh	(1929-2026). Formerly Rector of Ipswich. Consecrated January 1986. Retired 1995.
1996	2013	John Went	(b. 1944) Formerly Archdeacon of Surrey
2013	2016	Martyn Snow	(b. 1968) Formerly Archdeacon of Sheffield and Rotherham; translated to Leicester
2016	present	Robert Springett	(b. 1962) Formerly Archdeacon of Cheltenham; consecrated 30 November 2016.
