= Diocese of Gloucester =

Diocese of the Church of England

Coordinates: 51.867°N 2.247°W

Diocese of Gloucester Dioecesis Glocestrensis
- Coat of arms

- Flag

Location
- Ecclesiastical province: Canterbury
- Archdeaconries: Cheltenham, Gloucester

Statistics
- Parishes: 323
- Churches: 396

Information
- Cathedral: Gloucester Cathedral; Bristol Cathedral (1836–1897)
- Language: English

Current leadership
- Bishop: Rachel Treweek, Bishop of Gloucester
- Suffragan: Robert Springett, Bishop of Tewkesbury
- Archdeacons: Hilary Dawson, Archdeacon of Gloucester; Katrina Scott, Archdeacon of Cheltenham

Website
- gloucester.anglican.org

The Diocese of Gloucester is a Church of England diocese based in Gloucester, covering the non-metropolitan county of Gloucestershire. The cathedral is Gloucester Cathedral and the bishop is the Bishop of Gloucester. It is part of the Province of Canterbury.

== History ==
The diocese was founded during the English Reformation on 3 September 1541 from part of the Diocese of Hereford and the Diocese of Worcester. In 1542 the Diocese of Bristol was created out of part of the southern part of the diocese, to cover Bristol. Gloucester diocese was briefly dissolved and returned to Worcester again from 20 May 1552 until Queen Mary re-divided the two Sees in 1554.

Coat of arms of the Diocese of Gloucester and Bristol, consisting of the diocesan arms of Gloucester impaled with the diocesan arms of Bristol

On 5 October 1836, the Diocese of Bristol was merged back into the Gloucester diocese, which became the Diocese of Gloucester and Bristol until Bristol became an independent diocese again on 9 July 1897, whereupon the Gloucester diocese resumed the name Diocese of Gloucester.

The diocese has twinning links with the dioceses of Dornakal and Karnataka Central in the Church of South India, Västerås in Sweden, El Camino Real in California, USA, and Western Tanganyika in Tanzania. It is currently supporting the work of the Diocese of Western Tanganyika to build a new high school.

== Organisation ==
The diocese is divided into two archdeaconries: Cheltenham, headed by the Archdeacon of Cheltenham (Katrina Scott), and Gloucester, headed by the Archdeacon of Gloucester, Hilary Dawson. The Archdeaconry of Cheltenham consists of the deaneries of Cheltenham, Cirencester, North Cotswold, and Tewkesbury, and the Archdeaconry of Gloucester consists of the deaneries of Forest South, Gloucester City, Severn Vale, Stroud, and Wotton.

=== Bishops ===
The diocesan Bishop of Gloucester, Rachel Treweek (the first female diocesan bishop in the Church of England), is assisted by the Bishop suffragan of Tewkesbury, Robert Springett. The provincial episcopal visitor (for parishes in this diocese – among twelve others in the western part of the Province of Canterbury – that reject the ministry of priests who are women, since 1994) is the Bishop suffragan of Oswestry, who is licensed as an honorary assistant bishop of the diocese in order to facilitate his work there.

There are four former bishops licensed as honorary assistant bishops in the diocese:

- 2010–present: Retired former Bishop suffragan of Warrington David Jennings lives in Northleach and is also licensed in the Diocese of Oxford.
- 2013–present: Bob Evens, retired former Bishop suffragan of Crediton, lives in Charlton Kings.
- 2014–present: Anthony Priddis, retired Bishop of Hereford, lives in Bridstow in Hereford diocese.
- 2014–present: retired Bishop of Guildford Christopher Hill lives in Ruardean.
