= Curate =

Religious occupation

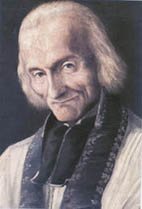
John Vianney, an early-19th-century French Catholic curate

A curate (/ˈkjʊərɪt/) is a person who is invested with the care or cure (cura) of souls of a parish. In this sense, curate means a parish priest; but in many English-speaking countries the term curate is commonly used to describe clergy who are assistants to the parish priest. The duties or office of a curate are called a curacy.

== Etymology and other terms ==
The term is derived from the Latin perfect passive participle cūrātus 'arranged (taken care of); healed, cured' of the verb curō 'arrange, see to, attend to; cure; etc.' (compare curator).

In other languages, derivations from cūrātus may be used differently. In French, the curé is the chief priest (assisted by a vicaire) of a parish, as is the Italian curato, the Spanish cura, and the Filipino term kura paróko (which almost always refers to the parish priest), which is derived from Spanish.

== Catholic Church ==
In the Catholic Church, the English word curate is used for a priest assigned to a parish in a position subordinate to that of the parish priest. The parish priest (or often, in the United States, the pastor or rector) is the priest who has canonical responsibility for the parish. He may be assisted by one or more other priests, referred to as curates, assistant priests, parochial vicars, or (in America) associate or assistant pastors.

== Anglican Communion ==
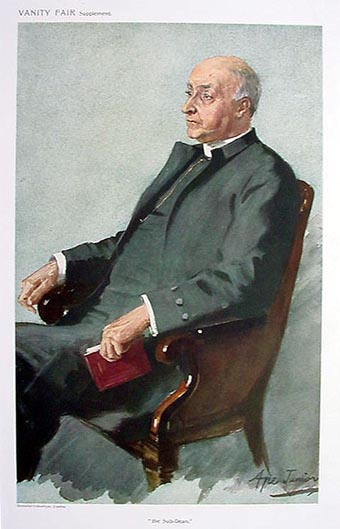
Edgar Sheppard, Curate at Marlow and Hornsey

In the Church of England today, curate refers to priests (or, in the first year, transitional deacons) who are in their first post after ordination (usually for four years), and are completing their training (not unlike an apprenticeship). The technical term curate, as found in the 1662 Book of Common Prayer, meant the incumbent of a benefice, that is the person licensed by the diocesan bishop to the "cure of souls", who, depending on how the benefice income was raised and distributed, was a rector, a vicar, or a perpetual curate. A vicar arises when a rectory was sold to lay rectors, which would often be a monastic house (such as abbey) or university college; a perpetual curacy where another priest or senior cleric has long-term control of the parish finances, granting an agreed stipend and general powers to the curate, albeit of theoretically of the same job security, below.

Although the expression curate-in-charge was mainly used of an informal arrangement whereby an incumbent gave most responsibility for one of the parish churches to an assistant, in law it denoted a cleric licensed by the bishop to exercise some or all of the cure of souls when the incumbent had failed to make adequate provision for them or was subject to disciplinary measures. Once in possession of their benefices, rectors and vicars enjoyed a somewhat locally varied array of rights, absolutely, a home in which to live without charge, and generally a generous income from the parish especially in the era of tithes, yet could be removed after due legal process and for a restricted number of reasons.

Perpetual curates were placed on a similar footing in 1838 and were commonly styled "vicars", and this practice was legally recognised in 1868. Clergy (both transitional deacons and priests) who assist the "curate" were, and are, properly called assistant curates, but are often referred to as "the curate".

A house provided for an assistant curate is sometimes colloquially called a "curatage". Assistant curates are also licensed by the bishop, but only at the request of the "curate", who had the right of dismissal subject to certain conditions. Although it is customary for a priest to serve as a curate in one or more parishes before becoming an incumbent, it is by no means unknown for priests who have previously been beneficed or consecrated bishop to return to a curacy (as assistant curate), sometimes as a matter of choice. For example, Geoffrey Francis Fisher served as Curate of Trent near Sherborne after retiring as Archbishop of Canterbury in 1961.

With the 1968 Pastoral Measure and subsequent legislation, the Church of England has undergone a major process of reform which still continues today, and much of above no longer holds good. Ministers in the Church of England whose main income comes from sources other than their work as clergy may be termed "self-supporting ministers" or "curate (SSM)".

Terms like rector and curate were carried overseas with the spread of Anglicanism, but their exact meaning depends on local conditions and regulations. In the Church of Ireland some curates are styled "bishop's curates" as they are accountable directly to the diocesan bishop, while sometimes mentored by local parish clergy, and are perceived to have more autonomy than other assistant curates.

In Anglican parishes with a charismatic or evangelical (low church) tradition, the roles of curates are usually seen as being an assistant leader to the overall leader, often in a larger team of pastoral leaders. Many of the larger charismatic and evangelical parishes have larger ministry teams with a number of pastoral leaders, some ordained and others who are not.

In the Episcopal Church of the United States, the curacy may be a temporary place to continue training after ordination, similar to an internship, or it may be a permanent, subordinant position, more akin to a perpetual curate.

=== Training ===
In the Church of England, the ongoing training of assistant curates is typically overseen by officers of the bishops called Initial Ministerial Education (IME) or Continuing Ministerial Development (CMD) Advisers.

== History ==
Originally a bishop would entrust a priest with the "cure of souls" (pastoral ministry) of a parish. When, in medieval Europe, this included the legal freehold of church land in the parish, the parish priest was a "perpetual curate" (curatus perpetuus), an assistant would be a (plain) curate (curatus temporalis).

The words perpetuus and temporalis distinguish their appointments but not the length of service, the apparent reference to time is accidental. A curate is appointed by the parish priest and paid from parish funds. A perpetual curate is a priest in charge of a parish who was (usually) appointed and paid by the bishop.

As the church became more embedded into the fabric of feudal Europe, various other titles often supplanted "curate" for the parish priest. "Rector" was the title given to a priest in possession of the tithe income. This right to the income was known as a "living". The title of rector comes from regere, 'to rule'.

Those parishes where a monastery had appropriated the rights to the tithe income, a portion of this income was set aside for a priest to occupy the parish, essentially acting on behalf of the monastery, in other words vicariously – hence "vicar". In some cases, a portion of a tithe for a vicar could exceed the income of some rectors, depending on the value of the livings being compared.

== Minor canons ==
Minor canons are those clergy who are members of a cathedral's establishment and take part in the daily services but are not part of the formal chapter. These are generally clergy who are nearer to the beginning than the end of their ministries, who have already served their curacy (title post) in a parish church. They are often selected for their singing and liturgical ability.

== See also ==
- Curate's egg
- Roman Curia
