= St Paul's Church, Shadwell =

Church in London, England

Coordinates: 51°30′34″N 0°3′9″W

St. Paul's Church, Shadwell
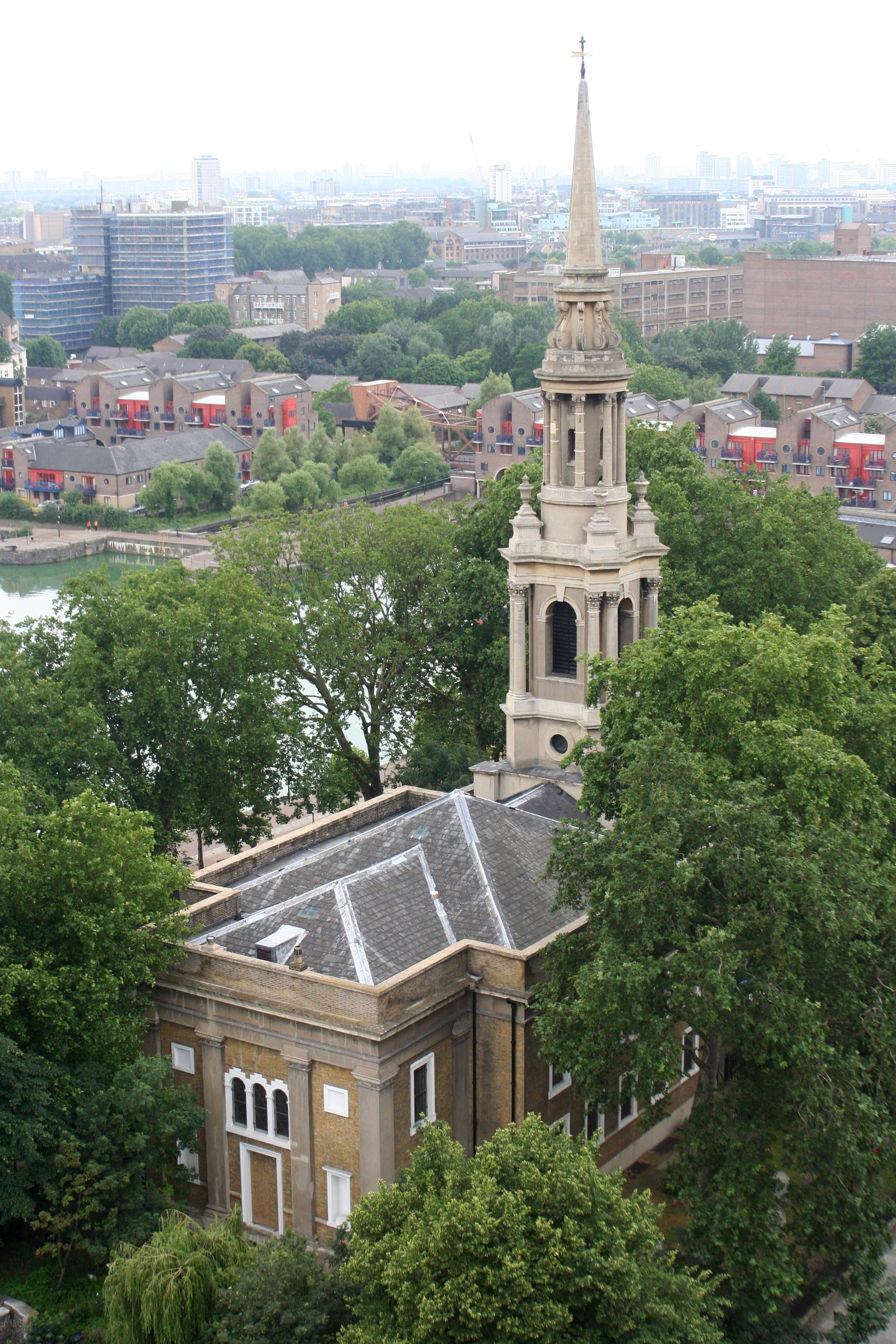
- St Paul's Church, Shadwell
- St. Paul's Church, Shadwell
- Location: Shadwell
- Country: England
- Denomination: Church of England
- Churchmanship: Charismatic/Evangelical Anglican

Architecture
- Heritage designation: Grade II*
- Architect: John Walters

Administration
- Diocese: London

Clergy
- Rector: Phil Williams

St Paul's Church, Shadwell, is a Grade II* listed Church of England church, located in Shadwell, in the London Borough of Tower Hamlets, England. The church is traditionally nicknamed the Church of Sea Captains.

== History ==
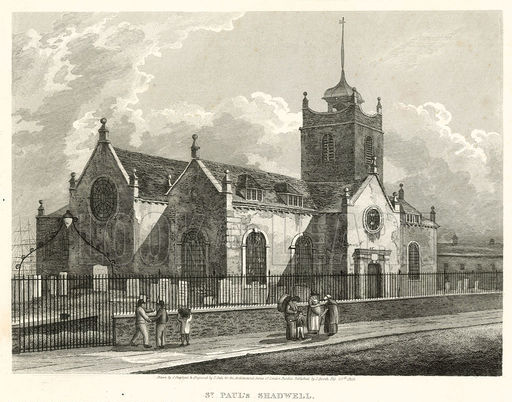
Original St Paul's Shadwell building

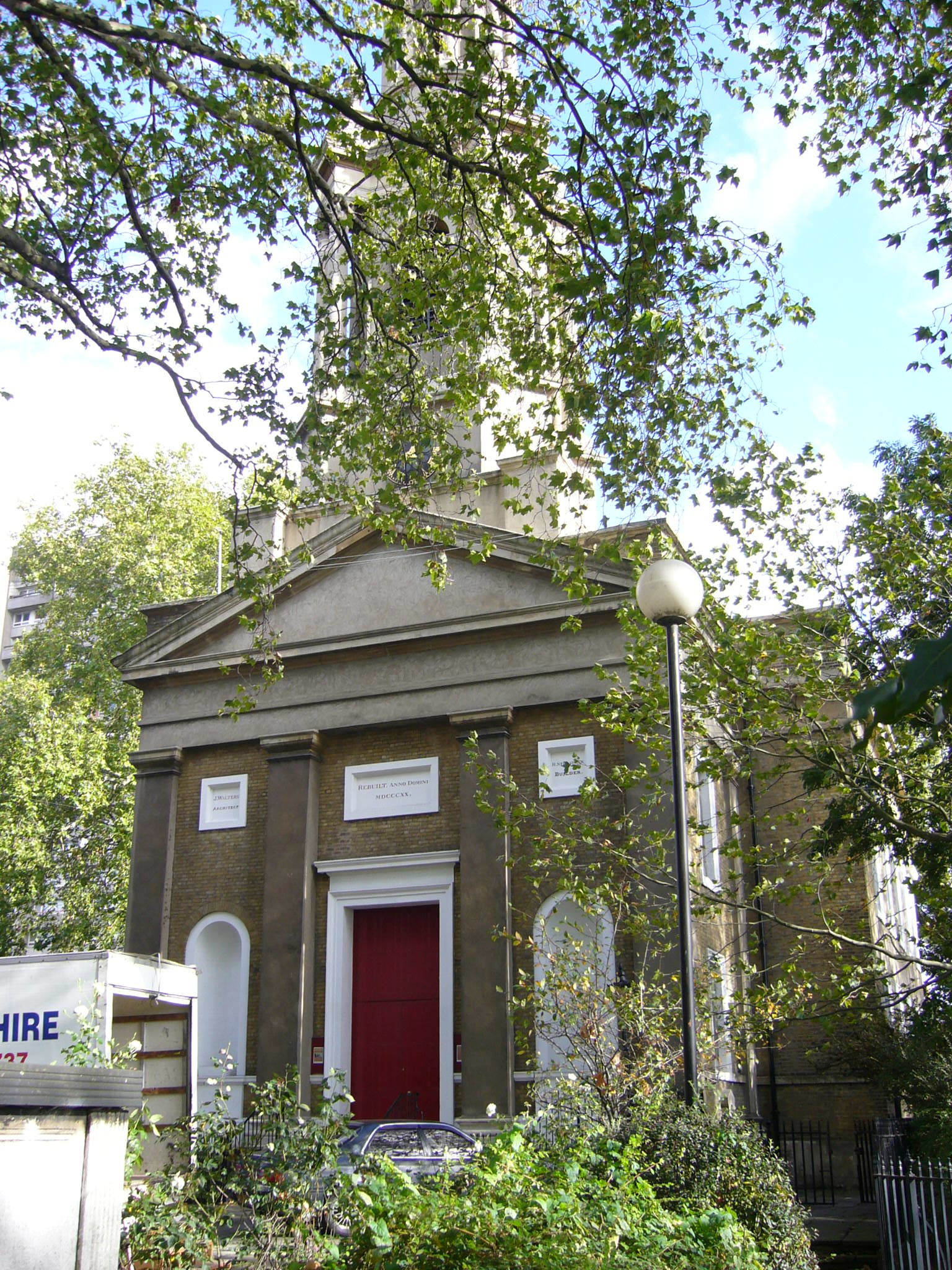
St Paul's Church, Shadwell in 2007

The old parish church, traditionally known as the Church of Sea Captains, was built in 1656, and was principally financed by Thomas Neale. It is believed that 75 sea captains are buried at the Church.

Matthew Mead was minister of the chapel from 1658 until 1662, when he was replaced after the Restoration for being too non-conformist. During the Great Plague of London it was one of five sites in the parish of Stepney used as plague pits. During the Great Plague of London in 1665, the Shadwell area was heavily affected by the outbreak. Historical burial records report that 504 burials took place between September and December of that year. October was one of the deadliest months, with 299 recorded burials. This shows how much impact the Plague had on the Shadwell community.

It was rebuilt in 1669 as the Parish Church of Shadwell, and by the Shadwell Church Act 1670 (22 Cha. 2. c. 14), St Paul's Shadwell became a separate parish from St Dunstan's, Stepney, where it had previously been a hamlet. The church was named after St Paul's Cathedral, and became the first parish created from St Dunstan's, Stepney since Whitechapel in 1338.

John Wesley was a preacher at St Paul's. Captain James Cook worshipped there, as did Jacob Phillip, the father of Captain Arthur Phillip, the first Governor of New South Wales. Cook's eldest son was baptised at St Paul's Church in 1763. Also baptised there were William Henry Perkin, the chemist who discovered the first aniline dye, and Jane Randolph, mother of Thomas Jefferson. The 1669 church was built in brick, and measured 87 feet (27 m) by 63 feet (19 m).

The church was demolished in 1817 and the present building, a Waterloo church designed by John Walters, was erected in 1821. A ring of eight bells, cast at the Whitechapel Bell Foundry in 1819, was installed. It is the only building built by John Walters that still survives. In the 1840s, half of the churchyard land was bought by the London Dock Company in a compulsory purchase order, in order to expand Shadwell Basin.

After the churchyard closed to burials, it was laid out as a garden by Fanny Wilkinson on behalf of the Metropolitan Public Gardens Association in 1886. The design included a partially flagged area in front for recreation. Some London planes survive from the original design. The rectory garden has an ancient Black Mulberry tree, which has been associated with Protestant Huguenot migrants from France, who greatly stimulated the East End weaving trade.

In 1950, the building became a Grade II* listed building.

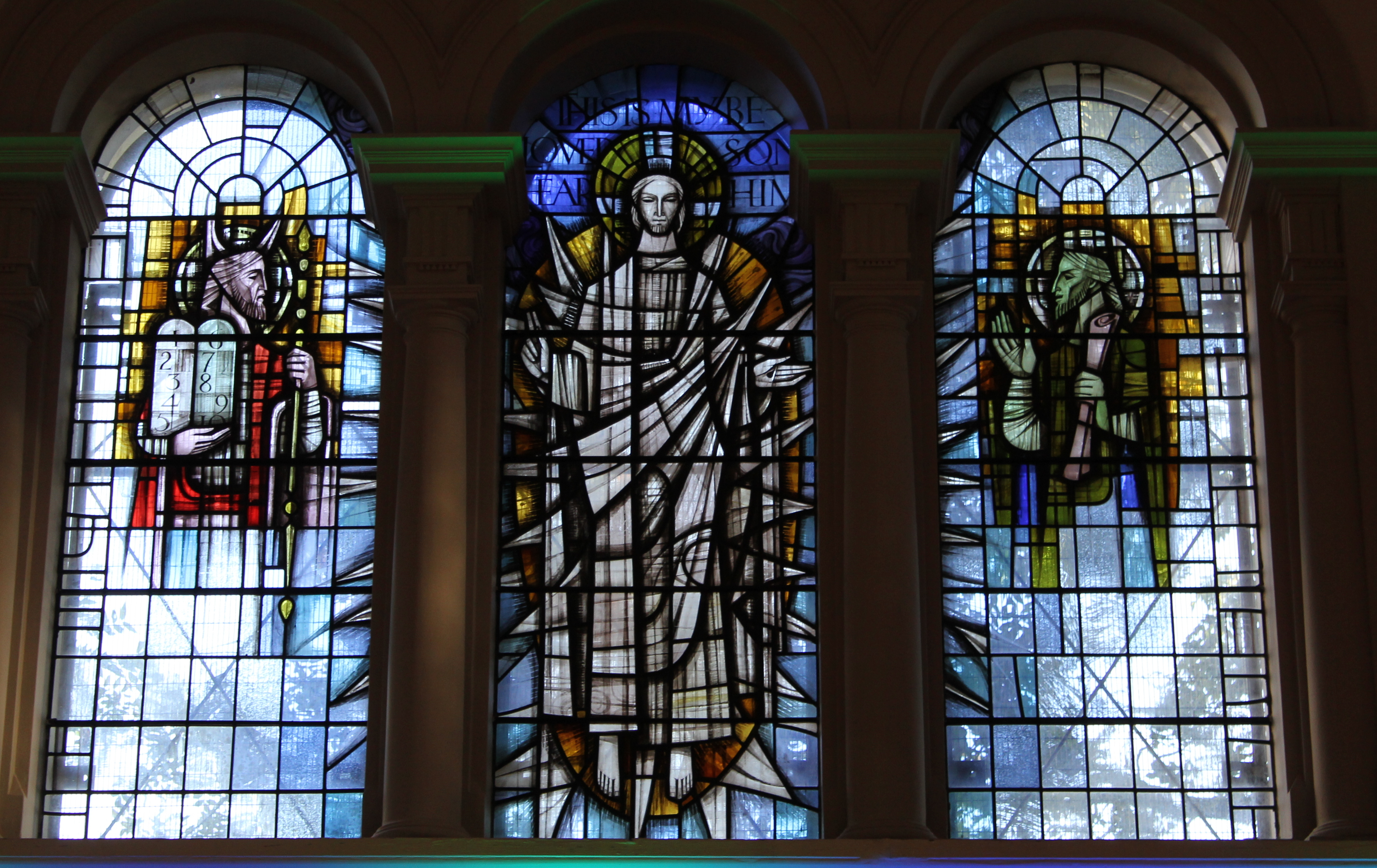
East chancel window by John Hayward (1964)

In 1964 a modern three-light stained-glass window, designed and made by John Hayward, was installed in the east chancel. It depicts the Transfiguration of a Christ with Moses and Elijah.

== Present ==
In January 2005, a team from the congregation of Holy Trinity Brompton moved to Shadwell to minister with the existing members of St. Paul's in serving the local area. This follows a number of similar church plants from Holy Trinity Brompton to declining churches around London with the support of the Bishop of London. The Rev Ric Thorpe was licensed as the new Priest-in-Charge on 20 January 2005 with The Rev Jez Barnes assisting him as the associate pastor. Thorpe was appointed Rector in 2010, and left in 2015 to become the Bishop of Islington.

St Paul's stands in the charismatic and evangelical Anglican traditions.

== Appearance in literature ==
The church is a pivotal location in James Lovegrove's Sherlock Holmes and the Shadwell Shadows.
