= Richard Thorpe (disambiguation) =

Richard Thorpe was an American film director.

Richard Thorpe may also refer to:

- Jerry Thorpe (Richard Jerome Thorpe), son of the film director, American television and film director and producer
- Richard Thorpe (rugby union), rugby union player
- Richard Thorpe (priest), Anglican priest
- D. R. Thorpe, known as Richard, historian and biographer
- Ric Thorpe (Richard Charles Thorpe), British Church of England bishop

== See also ==
- Rick Thorpe, Canadian politician
- Richard Thorp, English actor
- Richard Thorp (architect), Australian architect
