= Governor Elphinstone =

Governor Elphinstone may refer to:

- John Elphinstone, 13th Lord Elphinstone (1807–1860), Governor of Madras from 1837 to 1842 and Governor of Bombay form 1853 to 1860
- Mountstuart Elphinstone (1779–1859), Governor of Bombay from 1819 to 1827
