= Roger Sainsbury =

Roger Sainsbury may refer to:

- Roger Sainsbury (bishop) (1936–2025), British Anglican bishop
- Roger Sainsbury (engineer) (born 1940), British civil engineer
