= Michael Lloyd =

Michael Lloyd may refer to:

- Michael Lloyd (music producer) (born 1948), American record producer, musician, songwriter and music supervisor
- Michael Lloyd (RAF officer), Royal Air Force officer
- Michael Lloyd (priest) (born 1957), British Church of England priest and academic
- Michael Lloyd (special effects artist), special effects artist
- Michael Lloyd, jockey in the 1970 Grand National

== See also ==
- Michael Lloyd Ferrar (1876–1971), British officer of the Indian Civil Service
