= Francis Wollaston (philosopher) =

English natural philosopher and professor

Francis John Hyde Wollaston (13 April 1762 – 12 October 1823) was an English natural philosopher and Jacksonian Professor at the University of Cambridge.

== Life ==
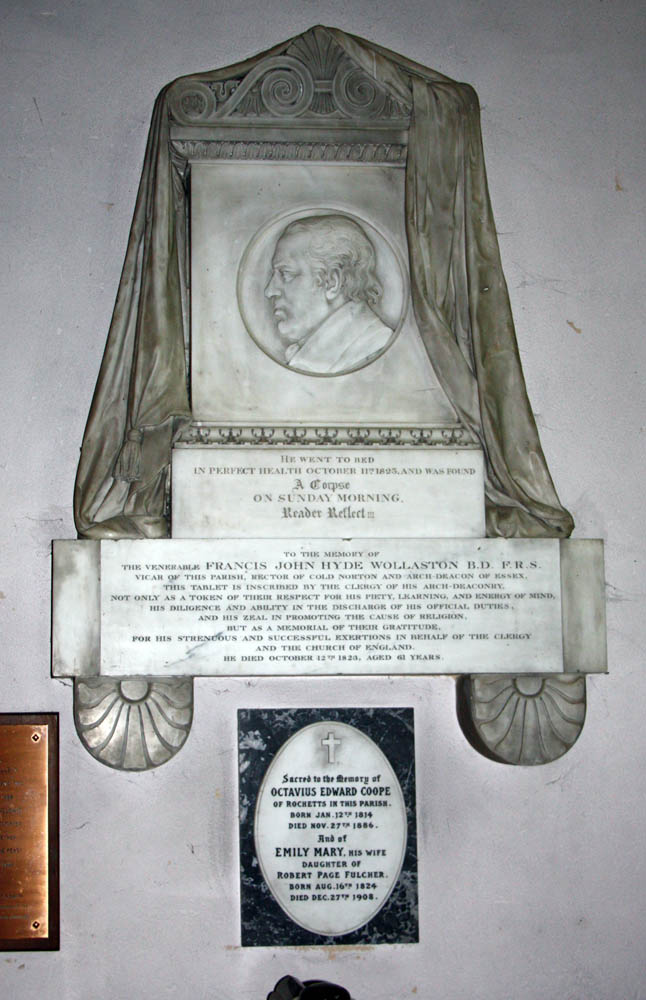
Monument to Francis Wollaston in South Weald church

Francis John Hyde Wollaston was born in London, the son of Francis Wollaston (1731–1815) and Althea Hyde, and brother to William Hyde Wollaston (1766-1828). He was educated in Scarning, Norfolk, and at Charterhouse before entering Sidney Sussex College, Cambridge, in 1779. He graduated as senior wrangler in 1783, became a fellow of Trinity Hall in 1785, and was ordained a priest in 1787.

Wollaston was elected a Fellow of the Royal Society in 1786. From 1792 to 1813, he was a Jacksonian Professor at Cambridge. Resigning his Trinity Hall fellowship to marry Frances Hayles in 1793, he became Rector of South Weald the following year. In 1807, he was elected Master of Sidney Sussex College, but the election was declared invalid on the grounds that he had never been a fellow of Sidney Sussex. On resigning his professorship in 1813, he assumed additional clerical duties: from 1813 to 1823 he was rector of Cold Norton and Archdeacon of Essex.

He is buried with his father in St Nicholas's Churchyard in Chislehurst.

== Works ==
- A Plan of a Course of Chemical Lectures, 1794
- Charge, delivered to the Clergy of the Archdeaconry of Essex, 1815

Academic offices
Preceded by Isaac Milner	Jacksonian Professor of Natural Philosophy; 1792–1813	Succeeded by William Farish
Preceded by William Elliston	Master of Sidney Sussex College, Cambridge (Disputed); 1807–1808	Succeeded by Edward Pearson
Church of England titles
Preceded by William Gretton	Archdeacon of Essex; 1813–1823	Succeeded by Hugh Jones
