= Hugh Jones (archdeacon of Essex) =

Ven. Hugh Chambres Jones (7 May 1783 – 29 September 1869) was a Welsh churchman who was Archdeacon of Essex from 1823 to 1861.

Jones was born in Liverpool, the only son of John Chambres Jones. He was educated in Liverpool and Macclesfield and in 1796 joined Westminster School as a King's scholar. In 1801, he was offered a scholarship to Trinity College, Cambridge but declined in favour of attending Christ Church, Oxford as a commoner. He matriculated in 1801, graduating B.A. in 1805. M.A. in 1807. He was Domestic Chaplain to the Duke of Portland. He held livings at West Ham for 36 years. He was Rector of Aldham from 1823–40 and Archdeacon of Essex from 1823–61.

In 1816, he became Treasurer of St Paul's Cathedral, holding the post until his death.

He married Helen, daughter of John Carstairs, of Stratford, Essex. They had no children. He divided his time between his residence in Portland Place and the family estate in Brynsteddfod or Bryn Eisteddfod, Glan Conwy, Wales. He died in Wales in 1869, following two years of illness.

Church of England titles
Preceded by Francis Wollaston	Archdeacon of Essex; 1823–1861	Succeeded by Carew St John Mildmay
