= David Hawkins (bishop) =

British Anglican bishop

The Right Reverend David Hawkins
- area Bishop of Barking
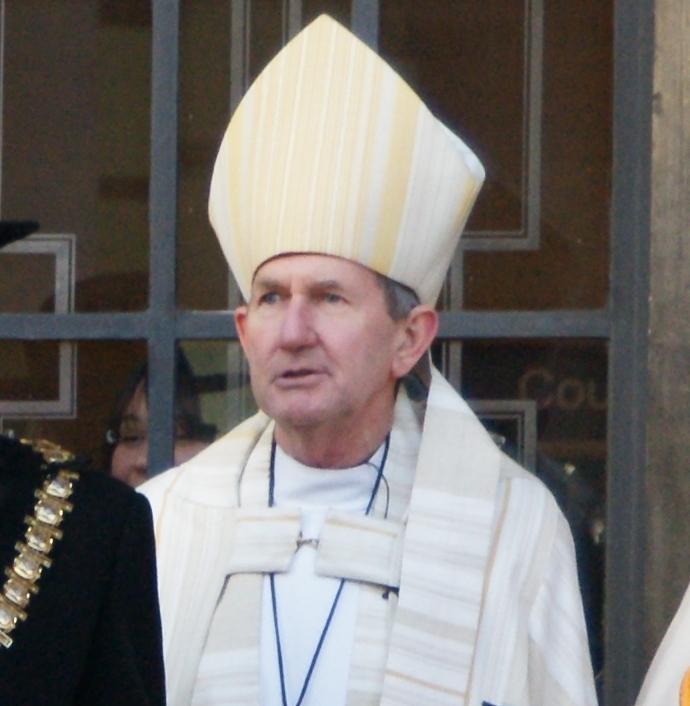
- Bishop Hawkins in 2010
- Church: Church of England
- Diocese: Diocese of Chelmsford
- In office: 2002–2014
- Predecessor: Roger Sainsbury
- Successor: Peter Hill

Orders
- Ordination: 1974
- Consecration: 17 October 2002

Personal details
- Born: 3 March 1949 (age 77)
- Denomination: Anglican
- Spouse: Carole (wife)
- Children: 3 daughters
- Education: University of Nottingham

David John Leader Hawkins (born 3 March 1949) is a British retired Anglican bishop. He was the third area Bishop of Barking (8th Bishop of Barking) in the Church of England from 2002 to 2014.

== Early life and education ==
Hawkins was educated at the University of Nottingham. After further study at St John's College, Nottingham he was ordained in 1974. He has a Bachelor of Theology (BTh).

== Ordained ministry ==
He began his ordained ministry as a curate at St Andrew's Bebington, after which he was spent six years in Nigeria. He was then vicar of St George's Leeds for 16 years until his ordination to the episcopate. On 17 October 2002, at Southwark Cathedral, he was one (with Richard Cheetham and David Hamid) of the last three people to be ordained and consecrated a bishop by George Carey before his retirement as Archbishop of Canterbury. He was installed at Chelmsford Cathedral in January 2003 and retired on 30 March 2014.

== Personal life ==
Hawkins is married with three children. He is a keen mountain walker.

== Styles ==
- The Reverend David Hawkins (1974–1982)
- The Reverend Canon David Hawkins (1982–2002)
- The Right Reverend David Hawkins (2002—present)

Church of England titles
Preceded by Roger Sainsbury	Bishop of Barking; 2002—2014	Succeeded by Peter Hill
