= Richard Turnbull =

Richard Turnbull may refer to:

- Richard Turnbull (theologian) (1960–2025), English theologian
- Richard Turnbull (colonial administrator) (1909–1998), British colonial administrator
- Richard Turnbull (politician) (1826–1890), New Zealand politician
