= Archdeacon of West Ham =

Church of England office

The Archdeacon of West Ham is a senior ecclesiastical officer – in charge of the Archdeaconry of West Ham – in the Church of England Diocese of Chelmsford. The current archdeacon is Mike Power.

== Brief history ==
Historically, the Archdeaconry of Essex formed part of the Diocese of London, until the Victorian diocese reforms transferred it, on 1 January 1846, to the Diocese of Rochester. The title first occurs in sources before 1100, as one of four archdeacons in the (then much larger) Diocese of London, but there had been four archdeacons prior to this point, some of whom may be regarded as essentially predecessors in the line of the Essex archdeacons.

From 4 May 1877, the archdeaconry made up part of the newly created Diocese of St Albans until it became part of the newly created Diocese of Chelmsford on 23 January 1914.

On 17 March 1922, the Archdeaconry of Essex was renamed the Archdeaconry of West Ham when the new Archdeaconry of Southend was created from part of the old archdeaconry.

The role of Archdeacon of West Ham has existed separately from the Bishop suffragan of Barking since 1958; the archdeaconry was itself divided to create the Harlow archdeaconry following a 1989 decision of the Diocesan Synod and again on 1 February 2013, by Pastoral Order of the Bishop of Chelmsford, the new Archdeaconry of Barking was created from the West Ham archdeaconry; initially, the Archdeacon of West Ham was also Acting Archdeacon of Barking.

== List of archdeacons ==
=== High Medieval ===
- ?–c. 1102: Theobald
- bef. 1102–bef. 1111: Walter (Note: Walter is not called "Archdeacon of Essex" in any sources; rather his territory can be deduced.)
- bef. 1132–1167 (d.): Richard Ruffus
- bef. 1168–bef. 1196 : Robert Banastre
- bef. 1204–aft. 1215: Richard de Hegham
- bef. 1221–aft. 1225: Theobald de Valognes
- bef. 1228–aft. 1243: Thomas de Fauconberg
- bef. 1248–aft. 1250 (res.): Hugh de Sancto Edmundo
- bef. 1253–aft. 1265: Stephen de Sandwic
- bef. 1272–aft. 1271 (res.): Richard of Gravesend
- bef. 1271–aft. 1274: Adam de Faversham
- bef. 1274–1283 (res.): Roger de La Legh
- bef. 1288–1293 (res.): Robert Winchelsey
- bef. 1295–bef. 1297 (deprived): Laurence de Fuscis de Bera
- 31 March 1299–aft. 1301: Aldebrand Riccardi de Militiis

=== Late Medieval ===
- bef. 1307–aft. 1307: Hildebrand de Anibaldis
- 29 January 1315–bef. 1319: Stephen de Segrave
- bef. 1328–bef. 1331 (d.): John de Elham
- 2 December 1331 – 3 September 1332 (exch.): William Vygerous
- 3 September 1332–bef. 1333 (d.): Robert de Canterbury
- 9 November 1333 – 22 January 1337 (exch.): Hugh de Statherne
- 22 January 1337–c. 1351 (res.): John de Bouser
- 20 June 1351 – 1361 (d.): William de Rothwell
- 30 November 1361–bef. 1367 (res.): John Barnet (son of Bishop John Barnet)
- 20 June 1367–?: John de Cantebrugg
- ?–bef. 1368 (res.): Roger de Freton (afterwards Dean of Chichester)
- 18 January 1368–bef. 1400 (d.): Henry de Winterton
- 11 February 1400–?: Richard Prentys
- bef. 1406–7 September 1420 (exch.): Edward Prentys
- 7 September 1420–bef. 1435 (d.): John Shirborne
- 5 April 1435–bef. 1461 (d.): Zanobius Mulakyn
- 5 August 1461 – 1472 (res.): James Goldwell (also Dean of Salisbury from 1463)
- 3 October 1472 – 16 May 1478 (exch.): John Gunthorpe
- 16 May 1478–bef. 1479 (d.): John Crall/Sudbury
- 22 December 1479 – 1480 (res.): Edmund Audley
- 21 July 1480 – 1499 (res.): Thomas Jane
- 4 November 1499–bef. 1502 (d.): John de Lopez
- 1502–23 August 1503 (d.): François de Busleyden, Archbishop of Besançon
- 24 January 1503–bef. 1543 (d.): Richard Rawson

=== Early modern ===
- 29 October 1543–bef. 1558 (d.): Edward Moylle
- 22 October 1558 – 23 October 1559 (deprived): Thomas Darbyshire (deprived)
- 3 January 1560–June 1571 (d.): Thomas Cole
- 10 July 1571–bef. 1585 (res.): John Walker
- 27 August 1585–bef. 1603 (res.): William Tabor
- 17 January 1603 – 1609 (res.): Samuel Harsnett
- 8 November 1609–bef. 1634 (d.): George Goldman
- 1634–11 August 1680 (d.): Edward Layfield
- 20 December 1680–bef. 1689 (res.): Thomas Turner
- 17 July 1689–bef. 1714 (d.): Charles Alston
- 22 July 1714–bef. 1737 (res.): Thomas Gooch
- 22 July 1737 – 9 August 1746 (d.): Reuben Clerke
- 6 February 1747 – 31 October 1752 (d.): William Gibson
- 28 November 1752 – 5 October 1771 (d.): Thomas Rutherforth
- 11 October 1771 – 5 April 1773 (d.): Stotherd Abdy
- 21 April 1773 – 10 November 1795 (d.): James Waller
- 2 December 1795 – 29 September 1813 (d.): William Gretton
- 11 December 1813 – 12 October 1823 (d.): Francis Wollaston
- 14 November 1823 – 1861 (res.): Hugh Jones

On 1 January 1846, the archdeaconry was moved to the Diocese of Rochester.

=== Late modern ===
- 18 February 1862 – 13 July 1878 (d.): Carew St John Mildmay

On 4 May 1877, the archdeaconry was again moved, this time to the newly created Diocese of St Albans.

- 1878–1882: Alfred Blomfield
- bef. 1883–17 March 1885 (d.): Gaspard-le-Marchant Carey
- 1885–1894 (res.): Henry Johnson
- 1894–22 August 1920 (d.): Thomas Stevens (as Bishop suffragan of Barking, 1901–1919)

On 23 January 1914, the archdeaconry was again moved, this time to the newly created Diocese of Chelmsford.

- 1920–1922: James Inskip, Bishop suffragan of Barking (became Archdeacon of West Ham)

On 17 March 1922, the Archdeaconry of Essex was renamed to the Archdeaconry of West Ham.

- 1922–1948 (ret.): James Inskip, Bishop suffragan of Barking
- 1948–1958: Hugh Gough, Bishop suffragan of Barking
- 1958–25 October 1964 (d.): John Elvin
- 1965–1970 (res.) Denis Wakeling
- 1970–1975 (res.): James Adams
- 1975–1980 (res.): John Taylor
- 1980–1988 (res.): Peter Dawes
- 1988–1991 (res.): Roger Sainsbury
- 1991–1995 (res.): Tim Stevens
- 1995–2007 (ret.): Michael Fox
- 2007 – 2024 (ret.): Elwin Cockett (retired 30 September 2024)
- 2024–present: Mike Power (previously Archdeacon of Southend; collated 5 October 2024)

== Sources ==
- Greenway, Diana E. (1968), Fasti Ecclesiae Anglicanae 1066–1300, vol. 1, pp. 12–14
- Horn, Joyce M. (1963), Fasti Ecclesiae Anglicanae 1300–1541, vol. 5, pp. 9–11
- Horn, Joyce M. (1969), Fasti Ecclesiae Anglicanae 1541–1857, vol. 1, pp. 9–10
- Horn, Joyce M. (1974), Fasti Ecclesiae Anglicanae 1541–1857, vol. 3, p. 59
