= George Russell Clerk =

British civil servant in India

Painting of Sir George Clerk, c. 1840

Sir George Russell Clerk GCSI KCB (pronounced Clark; c. 1801 – 25 July 1889) was a British civil servant in British India.

== Life ==
Clerk was born at Worting House in Mortimer West End, Hampshire, the son of John Clerk of Gloucester and Anne St John Mildmay, daughter and coheir of the late Carew St John Mildmay of Shawford House, Hampshire. Like all civil servants until the introduction of Competitive examinations in the 1850s, Clerk had studied at Haileybury College in Hertfordshire, being posted to Bengal as a writer in 1817.

Early in his career he worked in the Political and Secret Department of the Government, and most of his subsequent work was in that line. He thus worked as an Assistant to the President in Rajputana and Delhi, before being posted as Political Agent at Ambala and subsequently at Ludhiana in 1839 and Lahore in 1840.

In 1843, he was posted as Lieutenant-Governor of the North-Western Provinces (present day U.P.). He was then appointed Governor of Bombay from 1848 to 1850.

Subsequently, he worked outside India, helping establish the Orange Free State between 1853 and 1856 and then became the first Permanent Under-Secretary of State for India, a position which replaced that of the Examiner at East India House when the Government of India was looked after by the East India Company.

He was Governor of Bombay for a second time from 11 May 1860 to 24 April 1862. After this, like a lot of eminent personnel in the civil and military line, he was appointed as a member of the Council of India. He remained there until 1876.

He died in London at his residence, 33 Elm Park Gardens, on 25 July 1889.

== Family ==
In 1827, Clerk married Mary (died 26 November 1878), widow of Colonel Stewart. Their son was Sir Godfrey Clerk and grandson Sir George Clerk.

Government offices
Preceded by Vacant previously by- T. C. Robertson	Lieutenant Governor of North-Western Provinces; 30 June 1843 – 22 December 1843	Succeeded by James Thomason
Preceded by Lestock Robert Reid	Governor of Bombay; 1848–1850	Succeeded by The Viscount Falkland
Preceded by The Lord Elphinstone	Governor of Bombay; 1860–1862	Succeeded by Sir Henry Bartle Frere
