= John Walker (archdeacon of Essex) =

English churchman

John Walker D.D. (died 1588) was an English churchman, archdeacon of Essex from 1571.

== Life ==
Walker graduated from Cambridge, B.A. in 1547, and M.A. of Peterhouse in 1551. He was B.D. in 1563, and D.D. in 1569. He was presented to the small living of Alderton, Suffolk, and at some time was a noted preacher at Ipswich.

Walker attended the Convocation of 1563 as proctor for the clergy of Suffolk. In this capacity he voted in favour of the six articles for reforming rites and ceremonies, and signed the petition of the lower house for improved discipline. In 1564 he was licensed to be parish chaplain in St. Peter's, Norwich. Here his preaching was admired, and Matthew Parker, finding in 1568 that Walker was about to return to Alderton to avoid an information for non-residence, suggested that one of the prebendaries named Smythe should resign in Walker's favour. Parker also appealed to Lord-chancellor Nicholas Bacon, as did the Duke of Norfolk, with the result that, after some delay, Walker was installed a canon of Norwich on 20 December 1569.

In September 1570 Walker and some other Puritan prebendaries protested against the ornaments in Norwich Cathedral. He was cited, it appears, to Lambeth Palace in 1571 for his puritanism, but was collated to the archdeaconry of Essex on 10 July 1571, to the rectory of Laindon-cum-Basildon, Essex, on 12 November 1573, and on 14 August 1575 was installed prebendary of Mora in St. Paul's Cathedral.

John Aylmer summoned Walker in 1578 to elect sixty of the clergy to be visitors during the prevalence of the plague. In 1581 he was prominent in the conviction of Richard Wright, chaplain to Robert Rich, 2nd Baron Rich, who because of his ordination at Antwerp was refused a licence by the bishop; and on 27 September of the same year he assisted William Charke at a conference in the Tower of London with Edmund Campion, the Jesuit. The fourth day's dispute was chiefly in Walker's hands. Bishop Aylmer also employed him to collect materials for a work in refutation of Campion's Decem Rationes, and in 1582 appointed him to confer with captured Catholic priests. He preached at Aylmer's visitation on 21 June 1583, but resigned the archdeaconry about August 1585. His will was made 15 September 1588 and proved 21 September following. On 12 December 1588 the prebend in St. Paul's was declared vacant by his death.

== Works ==
Walker wrote a dedicatory epistle to Certaine Godlie Homilies or Sermons, translated by Robert Norton from Rodolph Gualter, London, 1573.
