= James Adams (bishop of Barking) =

Albert James Adams (9 November 1915 – 11 May 1999) was an Anglican bishop. He was the fifth Bishop of Barking — a suffragan bishop in the Church of England Diocese of Chelmsford — from 1975 to 1983.

Adams was educated at Brentwood School and King's College London. His first ordained ministry position was as a curate in Walkley. He was then successively succentor, then precentor, of Sheffield Cathedral; Rector of Bermondsey; Rector of Wanstead during which time he was also Rural Dean of Redbridge; and Archdeacon of West Ham (1970–1975) before being ordained to the episcopate on 24 June 1975 by Donald Coggan, Archbishop of Canterbury, at St Paul's Cathedral. He retired on 30 April 1983.

Church of England titles
| Preceded by William Chadwick | Bishop of Barking; 1975–1983 | Succeeded by James Roxburgh |
