= John Elvin =

John Elijah Elvin (b Sheffield 8 August 1900 d Romford 25 October 1964) was Archdeacon of West Ham in the Diocese of Chelmsford from 1958 until his death.

Elvin was educated at the University of Sheffield. He was ordained Deacon in 1927; and Priest in 1928. After curacies in Forest Gate and Squirrels Heath he was Priest in charge of St Michael, Gidea Park from 1931 to 1938; and Vicar there from 1938 until his appointment as Archdeacon.
