= James Roxburgh =

British bishop (1921–2007)

James William Roxburgh (5 July 1921 – 10 December 2007) was an Anglican bishop. He was the sixth Bishop of Barking (but first area bishop under the 1983 scheme) in the Church of England from 1983 to 1990.

Roxburgh was educated at Whitgift School in South Croydon and St Catharine's College, Cambridge. His first appointment in ordained ministry was as a curate in Folkestone. He then held incumbencies in Bootle, Drypool (Kingston upon Hull) and Barking. Before being ordained to the episcopate, he was the Archdeacon of Colchester. Following his retirement, he served as an Assistant Bishop in Liverpool.

Church of England titles
Preceded by James Adams	Bishop of Barking; 1983 – 1990	Succeeded by Roger Sainsbury
