= Hugh Gough (bishop) =

Australian bishop (1905–1997)

The Most Reverend Hugh Gough CMG OBE TD
- Archbishop of Sydney
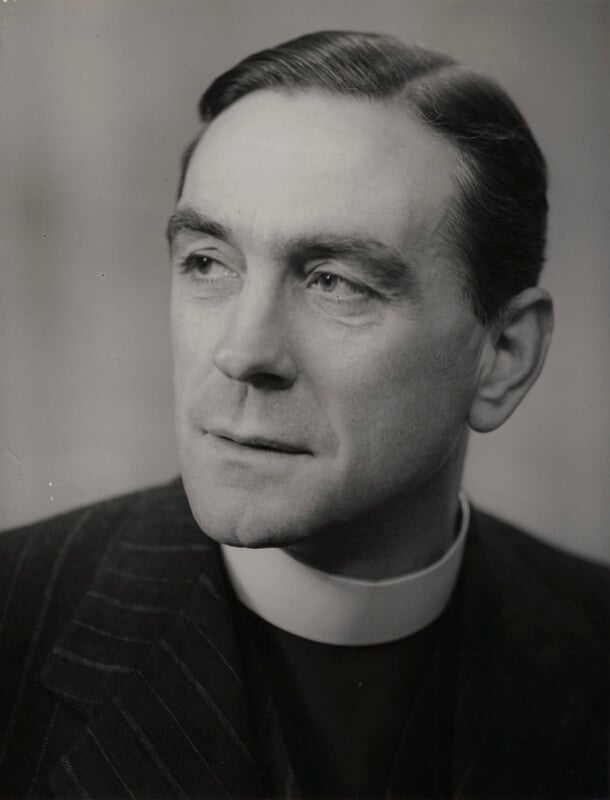
- Gough in 1948
- Church: Church of England in Australia
- Province: New South Wales
- Diocese: Sydney
- In office: 1959–1966
- Predecessor: Howard Mowll
- Successor: Marcus Loane
- Other posts: Metropolitan of New South Wales; (ex officio); Primate of Australia; (1959–1966)
- Previous posts: Bishop of Barking; (1948–1959); Archdeacon of West Ham; (1948–1958)

Orders
- Ordination: 1928 (as deacon); 1929 (as priest)
- Consecration: 1948

Personal details
- Born: Hugh Rowlands Gough; 19 September 1905 Thandiani, Punjab, British India (now Pakistan)
- Died: 13 November 1997 (aged 92)
- Denomination: Anglican
- Parents: Charles Massey Gough; Lizzie, née Middleton
- Spouse: Hon. Madeline Elizabeth Kinnaird (m. 1929)
- Children: 1
- Education: Weymouth College
- Alma mater: Trinity College, Cambridge
- Coat of arms

Hugh Rowlands Gough (19 September 1905 – 13 November 1997) was an Anglican bishop.

== Early life ==
Gough was born in Thandiani, Punjab, British India, into a clerical family, the son of the Rev. Charles Massey Gough and his wife, Lizzie Middleton. He was educated at Weymouth College and Trinity College, Cambridge.

== Clerical career ==
He trained for ordination at the London College of Divinity and was made deacon in 1928 and ordained a priest in 1929. His first position was as a curate at St Mary's Islington (1928–1931).

He was then successively perpetual curate of St Paul's Walcot, Bath (1931–1934), vicar of St James' Carlisle (1934–1939), Vicar of St Matthew's, Bayswater (1939–1946) as well as a chaplain in the British Armed Forces during World War II and (before his consecration to the episcopate) the vicar of St Mary's, Islington (1946–1948) and Rural Dean of Islington (1946–1948) and a prebendary of St Paul's Cathedral, London, in 1948.

He was the Bishop of Barking from 1948 to 1959 and Archdeacon of West Ham for most of that time before he was translated to be the Archbishop of Sydney, during which time he also served as Primate of the Church of England in Australia.

In 1961 he courted controversy by attacking atheist philosophers at Sydney University such as John Anderson for corrupting the youth.

His departure from Australia followed a complaint and allegations of having had an improper relationship with a married woman, after which the Rector of St Mark's Church, Darling Point was instructed to seek his immediate resignation.

On his return to England he was Rector of St Peter's Church, Freshford (1967–1972) after which he retired.

== Personal life ==
In 1929 he married the Hon. Madeline Elizabeth, daughter of the 12th Lord Kinnaird and his wife Frances Clifton of Lytham Hall. They had a daughter Lucy Gough born in 1931. She married first Mervyn Temple Richards and secondly John Vivian, 4th Baron Swansea.

Church of England titles
Preceded by James Theodore Inskip	Bishop of Barking; 1948 – 1959	Succeeded by William Frank Percival Chadwick
Anglican Communion titles
Preceded by Howard West Kilvinton Mowll	Archbishop of Sydney; 1959 – 1966	Succeeded by Marcus Lawrence Loane
Preceded by Howard West Kilvinton Mowll	Primate of Australia; 1959 – 1966	Succeeded by Philip Nigel Warrington Strong
