= Charles Turner (bishop) =

- Bishop of Islington
- Diocese: Diocese of London
- In office: 1898–1923 (d.)
- Other post: Rector of St Andrew Undershaft (1898–1911)

Orders
- Ordination: 1868 by Harold Browne (Ely)
- Consecration: 1898 by Frederick Temple (Canterbury)

Personal details
- Born: 14 January 1842
- Died: 13 July 1923 (aged 81)
- Denomination: Anglican
- Residence: Clapham Common (at death)
- Education: Trinity College, Cambridge

Charles Henry Turner (14 January 1842 – 13 July 1923) was an Anglican bishop, Bishop of Islington from 1898 to 1923.

Charles Henry Turner was educated at Highgate School and Trinity College, Cambridge. Ordained by Harold Browne, Bishop of Ely, in 1868, he was appointed Curate of Godmanchester then Chaplain to the Bishop of London. Afterwards he was Vicar of St Saviour's, Fitzroy Square in 1874, transferring to St George in the East, Shadwell five years later. Appointed to be Rural Dean of Stepney in 1897, he was ordained to the episcopate the following year.

He was consecrated a bishop on the Feast of St Barnabas 1898 (11 June), at St Paul's Cathedral by Frederick Temple, Archbishop of Canterbury. He served as Bishop suffragan of Islington, with responsibility for North London, which had hitherto been under the Bishops suffragan Bedford and then of Stepney. Turner was simultaneously Rector of St Andrew Undershaft. He died on 13 July 1923 at home in Clapham Common; he was still in post de jure but had de facto gradually retired in ill-health over the course of several years.

Church of England titles
| New title | Bishop of Islington; 1898–1923 | In abeyance Title next held by Ric Thorpe |
