= Edward Layfield =

Anglican priest

Edward Layfield (8 January 1605 – 7 August 1680) was a Church of England priest in the 17th century.

Layfield was born on 8 January 1604/5, the son of John Layfield, Rector of St Clement Danes in London and a translator of the King James Version, and his first wife Bridget (née Robinson), half-sister of William Laud, Archbishop of Canterbury.

He entered Merchant Taylors' School, London in 1617, and matriculated at St John's College, Oxford (of which Laud was then President) in 1620, graduating B.A. in 1624 (incorporated at Cambridge in 1625), M.A. 1628 (incorporated at Cambridge in 1633). He was awarded a Lambeth B.D. in 1635, and later a D.D.

In the church, Layfield's livings included:

- Rector of Ibstock, Leicestershire, 1632–35
- Prebendary of St Paul's Cathedral, London, 1633–80
- Archdeacon of Essex, 1634–80
- Vicar of All Hallows-by-the-Tower, London, 1635–80
- Rector of East Horsley, Surrey, 1637
- Rector of Wrotham, Kent, 1638
- Rector of Chiddingfold, Surrey, 1640–45
- Rector of Barnes, Surrey, 1663–80

Layfield's Laudian high-church practice brought him into conflict with the Puritans among his congregation at All Hallows. They complained to the Bishop of London and to Parliament that Layfield had set the communion table against the east wall of the church, that he had installed statues of saints to which he bowed, and 40 IHS inscriptions, and refused the sacrament to people who tried to remove them. In February 1643 Layfield was deprived of his church offices by Parliament. He refused to obey the order of deprivation. While celebrating a service, he was dragged from the church, placed on a horse with a prayer book tied round his neck, and made to ride through a jeering crowd, then imprisoned. At various times he was held in different prisons, and even on board a ship on the Thames.

He was restored to his positions in the church in 1662.

Layfield's vicarage next to All Hallows-by-the-Tower was destroyed in the Great Fire of London (the church itself survived except the porch); Layfield rebuilt it after the fire.

He died on 7 August 1680, and was buried on 10 August at All Hallows-by-the-Tower.
