= William Chadwick (bishop) =

Rt Rev Bishop William Frank Percival Chadwick (27 February 1905 – 12 February 1991) was Bishop of Barking from 1959 to 1975.

Born in Pudsey, Yorkshire, he was educated at Wadham College, Oxford and studied for ordination at Wycliffe Hall, Oxford before a curacy in St Helen's. He was then successively Vicar of Widnes, Crouch End and Barking. In 1959, he was appointed Suffragan Bishop of Barking in the Diocese of Chelmsford, where he remained until his retirement to Long Melford in 1975. He died in Sudbury, Suffolk in 1991.

Church of England titles
Preceded by Hugh Rowlands Gough	Bishop of Barking; 1959–1975	Succeeded by Albert James Adams
