= James Inskip =

British Anglican bishop (1868–1949)

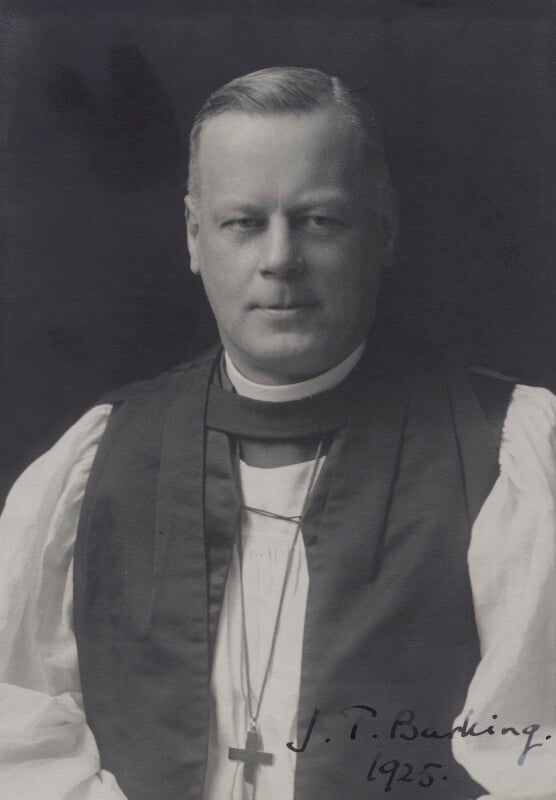
Inskip, c. 1925

James Theodore Inskip (6 April 1868 – 4 August 1949) was a British Anglican priest who served as Bishop of Barking from 1919 to 1948.

Inskip was the son of James Inskip, a Bristol solicitor, and his first wife Elizabeth, daughter of Edward Thomas Inskip. His younger half-brothers were Thomas Inskip, 1st Viscount Caldecote, who served in the government of Neville Chamberlain and as Lord Chief Justice of England, and Sir John Inskip, who served as Lord Mayor of Bristol. Inskip's mother died when he was one year old. He was educated at Clifton College and Corpus Christi College, Cambridge. His youngest daughter was the novelist, Constance Elizabeth (Betty) Inskip.

Ordained in 1892, his first post was as a curate at St James’, Hatcham. He was then successively a lecturer in pastoral theology at King's College London, Vicar of Jesmond and finally (before his elevation to the episcopate) Vicar of Christ Church, Southport. While Bishop of Barking, he also held the positions of Archdeacon of Essex (1920–1922) and Archdeacon of West Ham (1922–1948). Whilst bishop, Inskip lived first at Leyton, then in a large house bought by the diocese, Hillside, later the Gables, Albion Hill, Loughton.

Church of England titles
Preceded by Thomas Stevens	Bishop of Barking; 1919 – 1948	Succeeded by Hugh Rowlands Gough
