= Harry George Grey =

English missionary, author and theologian

Henry "Harry" George Grey (1851-1925) was an English missionary, author, and theologian who served as the third Principal of Wycliffe Hall, Oxford.

Harry Grey

Grey was the second son of Admiral George Grey (1809-1891) and a grandson of Prime Minister Earl Grey. He was educated at Wadham College, Oxford, graduating BA in 1873 and MA in 1876.

After a training curacy in the London slums, from 1876 to 1885 Grey served as Vicar of Holy Trinity Church, Oxford, a parish in the mostly working-class suburb of St Ebbe's. Grey returned to the metropolis in 1885, being licensed by the Bishop of Rochester to the curacy of St James, Clapham Park. Grey's work here was brief, as the greatest part of his ministry (1887-1909, with a break 1900-05) was spent as an agent of the Church Missionary Society in British India, particularly areas which would later become Pakistan, including Quetta, Amritsar, Lahore, and Gojra. He began work in this field just as Bishop Valpy French was leaving it due to ill-health. Grey's work in the region was described by Thomas Ewing as earnestly labouring 'in a more honourable part of the master's field'.

Grey returned to England and served as Principal of Wycliffe Hall, Oxford in succession to Francis Chavasse from 1900 to 1905, during which time he completed a number of scholarly works and was licensed by the Bishop of Oxford as to take services on the site of what was to become St Andrew's Church, Oxford. Although Grey resigned as Principal in 1905 for a second tour of service in India, he returned within five years to resume the post at Wycliffe Hall in 1910. He worked intermittently during this time and beyond (until 1923) as Examining Chaplain for Chavasse, who had moved to serve as second Bishop of Liverpool. The final years at Wycliffe were clouded by the First World War, during which the hall served to house refugees from Serbia and trainees from the Royal Flying Corps. It was Grey's second cousin once removed, Edward Grey, who for most of the war was directing British foreign policy. This may have been the reason for the Flying Corps' stationing at Wycliffe. On the death of another cousin, Albert Grey, 4th Earl Grey, Harry became heir presumptive to the earldom of Grey, though he was outlived by the 5th Earl, so never inherited the title or estate.

After living at the Hannington Hall from 1915 to 1921, and suffering acutely from arthritis, Grey finally left Oxford, concluding an association with the city which had lasted over fifty years, to live with his sister, Mary Elizabeth Grey at Moreton Pinkney Manor House. Following Grey's death in 1925, Chavasse (now in retirement in Oxford) published a biographical tribute to his old friend which includes a selection of Grey's sermons.

== Works ==
- St Paul's Epistle to the Romans (commentary) (1911)
- Baptism (1913)
- Comity in the Mission Field (1914)
- The Death of Christ (1916)
