= William Gibson (archdeacon of Essex) =

William Gibson DD (1717 - 1754) was a Canon of Windsor from 1746 to 1754 and Archdeacon of Essex from 1747 to 1752.

== Family ==
He was born in 1717, the son of Bishop Edmund Gibson of London.

== Career ==
He was educated at Christ Church, Oxford and graduated BA in 1737, MA in 1740, BD and DD in 1751.

He was appointed:

- Rector of Thorley, Hertfordshire
- Rector of Gilston, Hertfordshire
- Rector of St Botolph Bishopsgate 1743 - 1752
- Rector of St Martin Ludgate 1741 - 1743
- Prebendary of Rugmere in St Paul’s 1741 - 1743
- Prebendary of Kentish Town in St Paul’s 1742 - 1746
- Prebendarty of Chamberlainwood in St Paul’s 1742 - 1746
- Archdeacon of Essex 1747 - 1752

He was appointed to the eighth stall in St George's Chapel, Windsor Castle in 1746 and held the canonry until 1754.
