= Lynne Cullens =

British Anglican bishop

Lynne Susan Cullens (born 1964) is a British Anglican bishop serving as the tenth Bishop of Barking, a suffragan bishop in the Diocese of Chelmsford.

== Ordained ministry ==
Cullens was ordained in the Church of England as a deacon in 2012 and as a priest in 2013. She served as rector of Stockport and Brinnington in the Church of England's Diocese of Chester from 2019 until her consecration. She was consecrated a bishop by Justin Welby, Archbishop of Canterbury, on 25 January 2022 at St Paul's Cathedral.

=== Views ===
In 2023, she was one of 44 Church of England bishops who signed an open letter supporting the use of the Prayers of Love and Faith (i.e. blessings for same-sex couples) and called for "Guidance being issued without delay that includes the removal of all restrictions on clergy entering same-sex civil marriages, and on bishops ordaining and licensing such clergy."
