= William Charke =

English religious controversialist (died 1617)

William Charke (died 1617) was an English Puritan cleric and controversialist, known as one of those brought into the Tower of London to debate with the imprisoned Jesuit, Edmund Campion.

== Life ==
Charke was a fellow of Peterhouse, Cambridge. He was expelled in 1572 for declaring, in a sermon preached at Great St. Mary's, that the episcopal system was introduced by Satan. After the judgment of the vice-chancellor and heads of houses, he appealed to the chancellor, Lord Burghley, who interceded for him, but without success. On his expulsion from the university he was appointed domestic chaplain first to Henry Cheney, 1st Baron Cheney of Toddington, and then to Anne Seymour, Duchess of Somerset.

In 1580 Charke published a work against Edmund Campion. When Campion was a prisoner in the Tower, Charke was employed with John Walker to hold a discussion with him, on the fourth day of the procedure. A true report of the disputation ... set down by the reverend learned men themselves that dealt therein, was published in 1583. Robert Persons, in his Defence of the Censure gyven vpon two Bookes of William Charke and Meredith Hanmer, launched a heavy personal attack on Charke. It accused him of "merciless behaviour" in the place of execution.

In 1581 Charke was elected constant preacher to the society of Lincoln's Inn. After holding this post for some years, he was suspended in 1593 by Archbishop John Whitgift for Puritanism.
