= Church planting =

Establishment of a Christian church

Church planting is a term referring to the process (mostly in Protestant frameworks) that results in a new local Christian congregation being established. It should be distinguished from church development, where a new service, worship center or fresh expression is created that is integrated into an already established congregation. For a local church to be planted, it must eventually have a separate life of its own and be able to function without its parent body, even if it continues to stay in relationship denominationally or through being part of a network.

== History of church planting ==
According to the Rev. Mike Ruhl, "Church planting has been happening for nearly twenty centuries." The first place that the church spread from Judea was Samaria. Christianity spread to other areas because persecution forced the Christians to leave Jerusalem. Christianity then spread to the Gentiles largely because of the Apostle Paul, who had formerly been a Pharisee and a persecutor of the church. In the Bible, the book of Acts describes Christianity as spreading by the preaching of it in public areas. It then describes the believers of Christianity as gathering together regularly in homes and, at least in the beginning, at the Temple in Jerusalem. This period is known as the Apostolic Period. During this period, and up until the late 2nd century, there is no record of church buildings; instead, there are references to house churches. Not much is known about how these house churches multiplied. After the late-2nd century, church buildings became the norm. In 380, Christianity became the official religion of the Roman Empire, which convinced many to become Christians. As Germanic kings conquered areas of the Roman Empire, many of them converted to Christianity to gain the support of their new subjects.

In British colonies, Anglican missionary and church planting efforts coincided with British colonialism. The missionary model of Baptist missionaries, such as in mid-20th century Brazil, was a form of church planting. For Southern Baptists, church planting, with its focus on establishing new and independent congregations, is a logical outcome of their theology. "Southern Baptist mission work was driven by church planting. Based on a voluntaristic faith, the work defined individual salvation as the cornerstone of religious life; and religious life took place within local, autonomous congregations."

Recently, there has been a focus on Church Planting Movements. However, not all SBC/IMB members agree with the general theory of church planting movements and think much of it is, detrimentally, man- and method- focused rather than centered on God. Church planting is not troublesome but the "movements" part of the theory is For a discussion on the viability of church planting movements, Linda Bergquist and Michael Crane argue for and against the notion.

Holy Trinity Brompton, a Church of England church in London, has been involved in planting churches since the 1980s. Its plants form the HTB network. In May 2015, the Church of England announced that the See of Islington would be brought out of abeyance to create a "bishop for church plants". The bishop would be based in the Diocese of London but would also assist the whole Church. The following month, Ric Thorpe was announced as the first bishop for church plants. As of 2018, there were 49 churches in the HTB network.

== Models of church planting ==
There are several different models of church planting:

- Parachute or parachute drop method. In this method, a church planter and family move into a new location to start a church from scratch.
- Another method is for an existing church or church planting organization, known as the "mother" church, to provide the initial leadership, money, and personnel to start a new "daughter" or "mission" church. This may also be done by a group of organizations working together. The daughter church may either serve a new housing development, or may serve a specific cultural group which speaks a different language than the mother church.
  - One expression of this model is called the hiving method, in which a church sends a portion of its membership to start the new church.
- Another method is the "house church", or cell church, method. Small groups, called cells, which meet in homes may form and multiply using a relational model (see house church). Some cell groups are networked with one another and periodically meet together in a larger group.
- A church may also be planted when an existing church splits.
- The expansion of a multi-site church may result in new locations being established; however, this is not the same as church planting and, in some cases, is the result of the main church taking over a struggling independent congregation.
- In Methodist practice, "New Churches for New People" is concerned with creating new church communities and new forms of church, while "Church at the Margins" (CaM) is specifically focussed on church formation and inclusion among people who are "economically impoverished or vulnerable to economic poverty".

== Advocates ==
C. Peter Wagner describes church planting as "the single most effective evangelistic methodology under heaven" and for its advocates this remains church planting's greatest rationale. Gisbertus Voetius, a Dutch Reformer, viewed the purpose of Christian missions as threefold: conversion, church planting, and the glorification of God's grace. Georg Vicedom, in his book The Mission of God, says the goal of Christian missions to both proclaim the message and to gather people into the church.

== Territorial objections ==
For Anglicans and Catholics, "church-planting" can be very problematic because of the territorial nature of a diocese. For both the Catholic and Anglican churches, this practice may be viewed as an abrogation of the rights of a local bishop. This is because the bishop of the diocese has the right to decide where churches will be planted, and the phenomenon of church planting sometimes ignores both courtesy and obedience to the local bishop. Traditionally the Catholic Church has used this method in its missionary work to establish the initial church of a region or colony with the goal of establishing a brand new diocese. However in the modern era the necessity of this method has declined partly due to the global nature of the modern church.

This issue is particularly sensitive in regard to the Anglican diocese of Sydney in Australia, from which many Evangelical churches are "planted" in non-evangelical dioceses.

The Church of England has begun its Fresh Expressions initiative, which is seeking to encourage the development of new congregations even when they are across parish boundaries, for the sake of mission, under the bishop's permission. The recent Anglican conference GAFCON contained a broad hint that it would consider offering oversight to churches that have been planted without authorization from the local bishops.

== Church planting movement ==
In a missiological context, church planting may be defined as "initiating reproductive fellowships who reflect the kingdom of God in the world." When this happens with rapid growth, it is generally known as a church planting movement or disciple making movement. In a church planting movement, indigenous churches plant more churches within a people group or geographic area. A church will sponsor formation of multiple spinoff churches that will themselves very quickly reproduce new churches, generally with common teachings and doctrine. It is different from traditional missions in that the new churches are generally started by a lay leader from the sponsoring church and not an outside missionary. A key characteristic of an authentic church planting movement is the rapidity with which a new congregation itself starts another similar church.

=== History of church planting movements ===
The modern Church Planting Movement can trace its roots to the mid-nineteenth century when Henry Venn and Rufus Anderson developed the three-self formula of an indigenous missions policy: "they believed that young churches should be self-propagating, self-supporting, and self-governing from their inception." Donald McGavran, a missionary in India who "coined the concept of 'people movements' to Christ," is credited as an early proponent of the kind of missionary work that underlies the Church Planting Movement, by focusing his missionary work on converting groups of people ("groups, tribes, villages, ethnic groups") rather than individuals.

According to One Magazine, the official organ of the National Association of Free Will Baptists, such tactics were used successfully in Cuba in the 1940s by Tom and Mabel Willey; in the 1950s in North India Carlisle and Marie Hanna; and in the 1960s in Ivory Coast by LaVerne Miley. Christianity Today also claims success in Cuba for the "Western Baptists, historically linked to the Southern Baptist Convention." Bhojpuri church planting movement was started by David L. Watson and produced thousands of Churches from the beginning of Nineties. This is also the longest surviving (rather thriving) movement in the world. It has become Movementum now and still producing thousands of Churches. This movement is also referred to where the term church planting movement originated. This Movement has impacted many other countries and continues to impact the other parts of India as well.

=== Essentials of church planting movements ===
There are three key characteristics of a Church Planting Movement: it reproduces rapidly, multiplying churches, and that the churches are indigenous.

- Within a very short time, newly planted churches are already starting new churches that follow the same pattern of rapid reproduction. Though the rate varies from place to place, Church Planting Movements always outstrip the population growth rate as they race toward reaching the entire people group. Where with other methods of church planting it may take five years to plant a church, with church planting movement, multiple generations of churches may be planted within five months.
- "Church Planting Movements do not simply add new churches. Instead, they multiply." Most churches in the middle of a Movement will start as many churches as they can, with a goal of filling the area with new churches.
- Church Planting Movements are indigenous. It may start with the training from a non-native missionary or church member, but will very quickly form new congregations that are all within a single ethnic people group. Leaders are self-identified by their willingness to do what the trainer asks them, and then are given additional instruction on how to reproduce new churches.
- Church Planting Movements train leaders.

=== Methods ===
There is not a solitary method used to spark a church planting movement. The Training for Trainers (T4T) method has been successful in China. It differs from the Insider Movement in that leaders do not seek to act like indigenous persons, but simply train locals who train others within their (or closely related) people group. One popular interrelated element with T4T is called OBD (Obedience Based Discipleship) but it has not met with acceptance from certain church planters.
