= Gaspard-le-Marchant Carey =

James Gaspard-le-Marchant Carey (21 June 1831 – 17 March 1885) was an Anglican priest in the second half of the 19th century.

Born in Cape of Good Hope, Carey was educated at Brighton College and Trinity College, Cambridge. He was ordained in 1854, and served curacies at Charlcombe and Henny. He was Rector of Snodland from 1866 to 1874; and then of Boreham. He was appointed Archdeacon of Essex in 1882. and died in post in Folkestone.
