= John Elphinstone, 13th Lord Elphinstone =

Scottish soldier, politician and colonial administrator

John Elphinstone, 13th Lord Elphinstone, 1st Baron Elphinstone, GCB, GCH, PC (23 June 1807 – 19 July 1860) was a Scottish soldier, politician and colonial administrator. He was twice elected to the Parliament of the United Kingdom as a Scottish representative peer, serving once from 14 January 1833 to 29 December 1834 and then again from 8 September 1847 to 23 April 1859. His political career also included the governorships of Madras and of Bombay.

== Life ==
The only son of John Elphinstone, 12th Lord Elphinstone in the peerage of Scotland, he was born on 23 June 1807. He succeeded his father as Lord Elphinstone in May 1813, and entered the army in 1826 as a cornet in the Royal Horse Guards. He was promoted lieutenant in 1828, and captain in 1832, and was a lord in waiting to William IV from 1835 to 1837. The king made him a Knight Grand Cross of the Royal Guelphic Order in 1836, in which year he was sworn of the privy council.

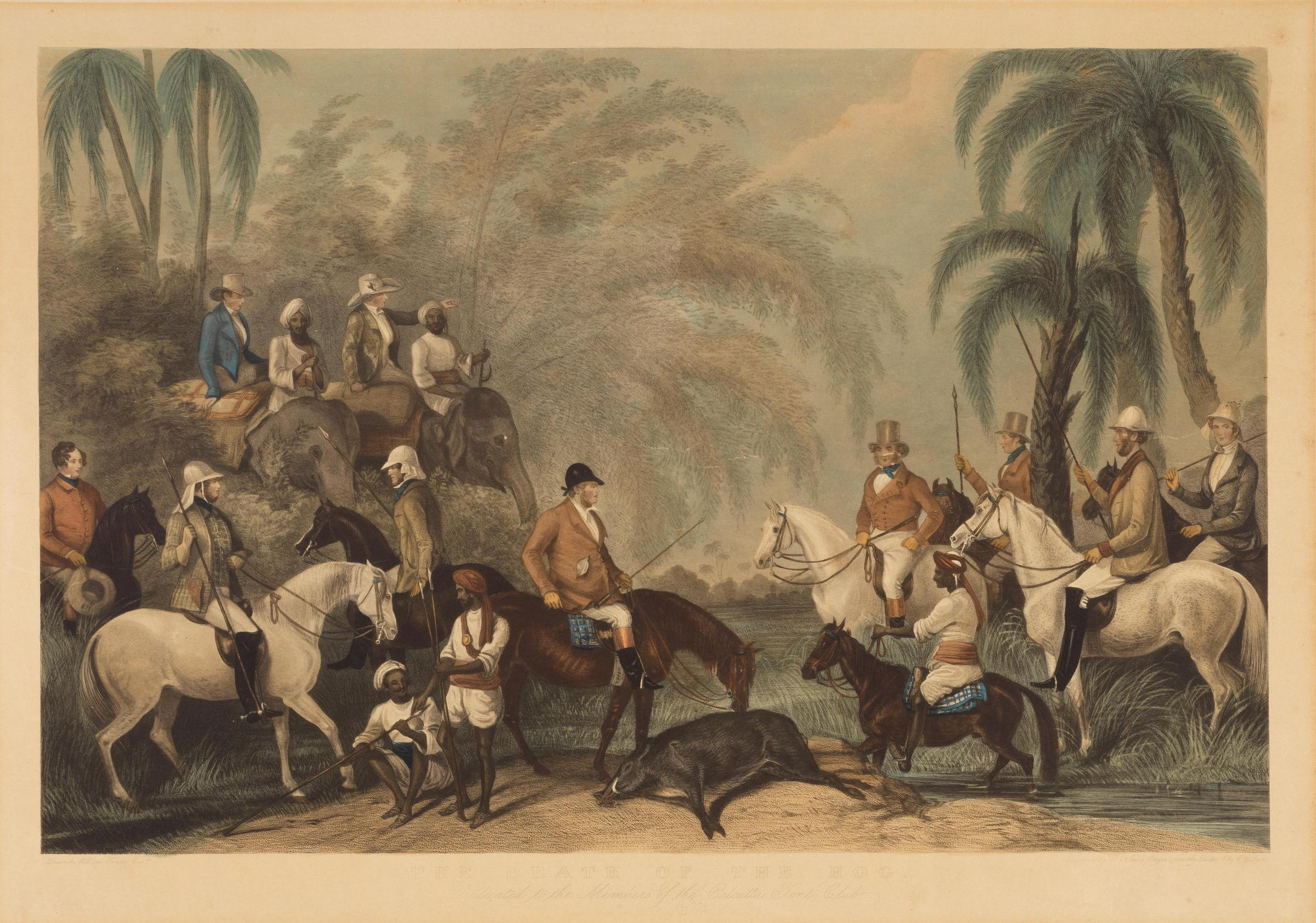
Captain Parr, and Elphinstone on elephants, hog hunting with members of the Calcutta Tent Club in 1840, as sketched by William Tayler

In 1837, he left the Guards on being appointed governor of Madras by Lord Melbourne; it was said at the time that his appointment was made in order to dissipate a rumour that the young Queen Victoria had fallen in love with him. He was governor of Madras from 1837 to 1842; he built a house at Káiti, in the Nilgiri Hills. On resigning his governorship in 1842 he travelled for some years, and explored Kashmir.

He returned to England in 1845, and in 1847 was appointed by Lord John Russell to be a lord in waiting to the queen, an office which he held until 1852, and again under Lord Aberdeen's administration from January to October 1853, when he was appointed governor of Bombay. During this governorship the Indian Rebellion of 1857 broke out. Elphinstone checked the rising at a few places in his presidency, and put down the insurrection of the Rajah of Sholapur. He discovered a conspiracy in Bombay itself, and he seized the ringleaders. and prevented the conspiracy from coming to anything. He sent many of his troops elsewhere.

He served as the District Grand Master of District Grand Lodge of Madras (1840-1852).

He was made a Knight Grand Cross of the Order of the Bath in 1858, and on 21 May 1859, on his return to England, he was created a peer of the United Kingdom as Baron Elphinstone of Elphinstone, Stirlingshire. He died unmarried in King Street, St. James's, London, on 19 July 1860, when his peerage of the United Kingdom became extinct.

Political offices
Preceded by Sir Frederick Adam	Governor of Madras; 1837–1842	Succeeded by The Marquess of Tweeddale
Preceded by The Viscount Galway	Lord-in-waiting; 1853	Succeeded by ?
Preceded by The Viscount Falkland	Governor of Bombay; 1853–1860	Succeeded by Sir George Clerk
Peerage of Scotland
Preceded by John Elphinstone	Lord Elphinstone; 1813–1860	Succeeded by John Elphinstone-Fleming
Peerage of the United Kingdom
New title	Baron Elphinstone; 1859–1860	Extinct
