= Michael Lloyd (priest) =

British Church of England priest and academic

The Reverend Canon Michael Lloyd
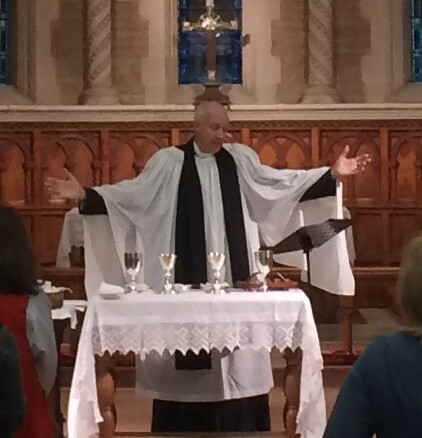
- Lloyd presiding at Holy Communion in 2020

Principal of Wycliffe Hall, Oxford
- Incumbent
- Assumed office 2013
- Preceded by: Simon Vibert (acting)

Personal details
- Born: 1 November 1957 (age 68)
- Education: Downing College, Cambridge; Cranmer Hall, Durham; Worcester College, Oxford

Religious life
- Religion: Christianity
- Church: Church of England
- Ordination: 1984 (deacon); 1985 (priest)

Michael Francis Lloyd (born 1 November 1957) is a British Church of England priest and academic. He has been principal of Wycliffe Hall, University of Oxford, since his appointment in 2013.

== Early life and education ==
Lloyd was born on 1 November 1957. He studied at Downing College, Cambridge, graduating with a Bachelor of Arts (BA) degree in 1979: as per tradition, his BA was promoted to a Master of Arts (MA Cantab). From 1981 to 1984, he trained for ordination at Cranmer Hall, Durham, an open evangelical theological college. He also studied theology at Durham University as a member of St John's College, and graduated in 1983 with first-class honours BA. He later undertook postgraduate research at Worcester College, Oxford, completing his Doctor of Philosophy (DPhil) degree in 1997. His doctoral thesis was titled "The cosmic fall and the free will defence".

== Ordained ministry ==
Lloyd was ordained in the Church of England as a deacon in 1984 and as a priest in 1985. From 1984 to 1987, he served his curacy at St John the Baptist, Locks Heath in the Diocese of Portsmouth. After his curacy, he moved in to university chaplaincy and served as assistant chaplain at Worcester College, Oxford from 1989 to 1990. He moved to the University of Cambridge and was the director of studies in theology and chaplain of Christ's College, Cambridge from 1990 to 1994 and chaplain of Fitzwilliam College, Cambridge from 1995 to 1996.

He was formerly the chaplain at The Queen's College, Oxford, and was the Director of Studies in Theology at Christ's College, Cambridge. Lloyd has taught theology and doctrine at the University of Oxford, Cambridge University and St Paul's Theological Centre, London. He has published the popular introduction Café Theology and has a particular interest in the doctrine of evil and the problem of pain.

In February 2025, he was appointed an honorary canon of Christ Church Cathedral, Oxford.

== Selected works ==
- Lloyd, Michael (2005). Café Theology: Exploring Love, the Universe and Everything. London: Alpha International. ISBN 978-1904074762.
- Atkinson, Rachel; Lloyd, Michael (2023). Image Bearers: Restoring our identity and living out our calling. London: Hodder and Stoughton. ISBN 978-1529318661.
- Southgate, Christopher; Fiddes, Paul; Lloyd, Michael; Messer, Neil; Sollereder, Bethany; Wynn, Mark (2025). God, struggle, and suffering in the evolution of life (1st ed.). London: T&T Clark. ISBN 978-0567716484.
