= Roger Sainsbury (bishop) =

English Anglican clergyman (1936–2025)

The Rt Revd Roger Sainsbury
- Bishop of Barking
- Diocese: Diocese of Chelmsford
- In office: 1991–2002
- Predecessor: James Roxburgh
- Successor: David Hawkins
- Other posts: Honorary assistant bishop in Bath & Wells (from 2003 until his death); Archdeacon of West Ham (1988–1991)

Orders
- Ordination: 1960 (deacon); 1961 (priest)
- Consecration: 1991

Personal details
- Born: 2 October 1936
- Died: 20 May 2025 (aged 88)
- Denomination: Anglican
- Parents: Frederick & Lillian
- Spouse: Jennifer Carey (m. 1960)
- Profession: Author
- Education: Jesus College, Cambridge

Roger Frederick Sainsbury (2 October 1936 – 20 May 2025) was an English Anglican bishop. He was the second area Bishop of Barking (the seventh Bishop of Barking) in the Church of England from 1991 to 2002.

== Biography ==
Sainsbury was born on 2 October 1936. He was educated at Jesus College, Cambridge before beginning his ordained ministry as a curate at Christ Church, Spitalfields. He was then "missioner" at Shrewsbury House, Liverpool, Warden of the Mayflower Family Centre, Canning Town; Vicar of Walsall; and finally, before being ordained to the episcopate, the Archdeacon of West Ham. In retirement he served as an assistant bishop in the Diocese of Bath and Wells, where he lived at Portishead, Somerset.

Sainsbury died on 20 May 2025, at the age of 88.

Church of England titles
Preceded by James Roxburgh	Bishop of Barking; 1991–2002	Succeeded by David Hawkins
