= Peter Hill (bishop) =

British Anglican bishop (born 1950)

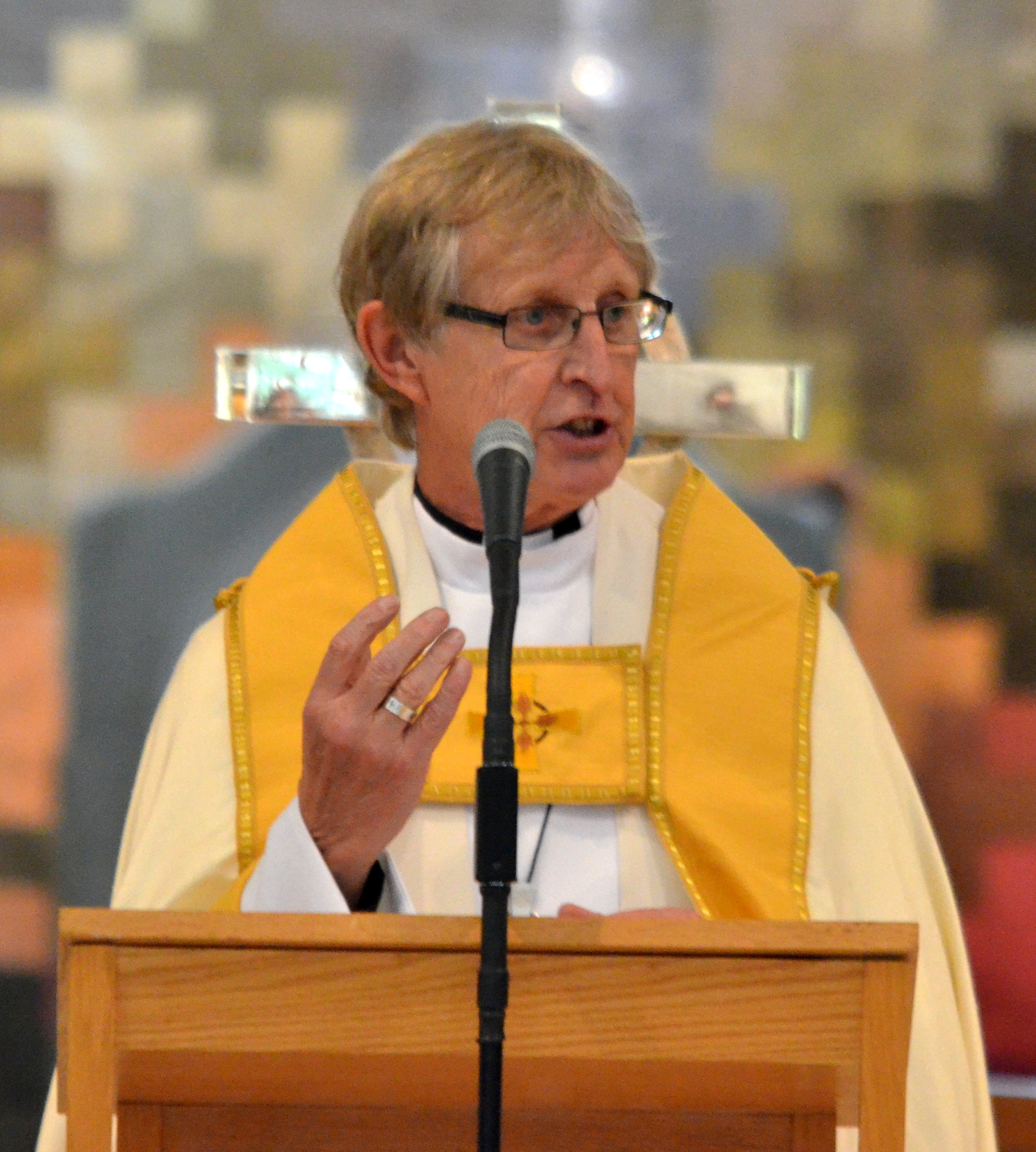
Hill at his installation, Chelmsford Cathedral, 2014

Peter Hill (born 4 February 1950) is a retired Church of England bishop who served as Bishop of Barking (an area bishop in the Diocese of Chelmsford), 2014–2021. He was previously Archdeacon of Nottingham, 2007–2014.

== Early life and education ==
Hill grew up in Swansea and studied at the University of Manchester, then the University of Nottingham. He spent eight years teaching in Manchester before training for the ministry at Wycliffe Hall, Oxford.

== Ordained ministry ==
Hill was made a deacon at Petertide 1983 (3 July) and ordained a priest the Petertide next (1 July 1984) — both times by Denis Wakeling, Bishop of Southwell, at Southwell Minster.

He was curate of St James' Church, Porchester in Nottingham from 1983 to 1986 and Vicar of All Saints' Church, Huthwaite from 1986 to 1995. Appointed Priest-in-Charge of St Wilfrid's Church, Calverton in 1995 he also served as Area Dean of Southwell from 1997 to 2001. He moved from both posts in 2004 to be Chief Executive of the Diocese of Southwell and Nottingham. He was consecrated a bishop on 25 July 2014, by Justin Welby, Archbishop of Canterbury, at St Paul's Cathedral; he is also currently Vice Chair of the Dioceses Commission.

Ahead of Stephen Cottrell's translation from Chelmsford to York, Hill became (additionally) Acting diocesan Bishop of Chelmsford on Easter Day, 12 April 2020. That role ended on 19 April 2021. Hill then retired effective 4 August 2021.

Bishop Peter Hill is now an associate minister at St Mary Magdalene Church, Newark-on-Trent.
