= Bishop of Barking =

Episcopal title

The Bishop of Barking is an episcopal title used by an area bishop of the Church of England Diocese of Chelmsford, in the Province of Canterbury.

The Barking area comprises the east London boroughs of Barking and Dagenham, Havering, Newham, Redbridge and Waltham Forest, together with the Epping Forest and Harlow districts of west Essex. The total population of these in 2023 was 1,674,392 (estimated) and includes a wide mix of ethnicity and culture. The area comprises 166 churches, 60 of which are set in urban priority area parishes. The Barking area also includes the main site for the 2012 Summer Olympics in London. Initially, the see was suffragan to the Bishop of St Albans – the Diocese of Chelmsford was not created until 1914. The bishops suffragan of Barking have been area bishops since the Chelmsford area scheme was erected in 1983.

The current bishop, since 2022, is Lynne Cullens. She had previously been Rector of Stockport and Brinnington in the Diocese of Chester since 2019.

== List of bishops ==
Bishops of Barking
From	Until	Incumbent	Notes
1901	1919	Thomas Stevens	(1841–1920). Also Archdeacon of Essex (1895–1920).
1919	1948	James Inskip	(1868–1949). Also Archdeacon of Essex (1920–1922); Archdeacon of West Ham (1922–1948).
1948	1959	Hugh Gough	(1905–1997). Also Archdeacon of West Ham (1948–1958); translated to Sydney.
1959	1975	William Chadwick	(1905–1991)
1975	1983	James Adams	(1915–1999)
1983	1990	James Roxburgh	(1921–2007) First area bishop.
1991	2002	Roger Sainsbury	(1936–2025)
2002	30 March 2014	David Hawkins	(b. 1949)
25 July 2014	4 August 2021	Peter Hill	(b. 1950). Previously Archdeacon of Nottingham; retired effective 4 August 2021.
2022	present	Lynne Cullens	(b. 1964). Consecrated 25 January 2022.
