= Thomas Stevens (bishop) =

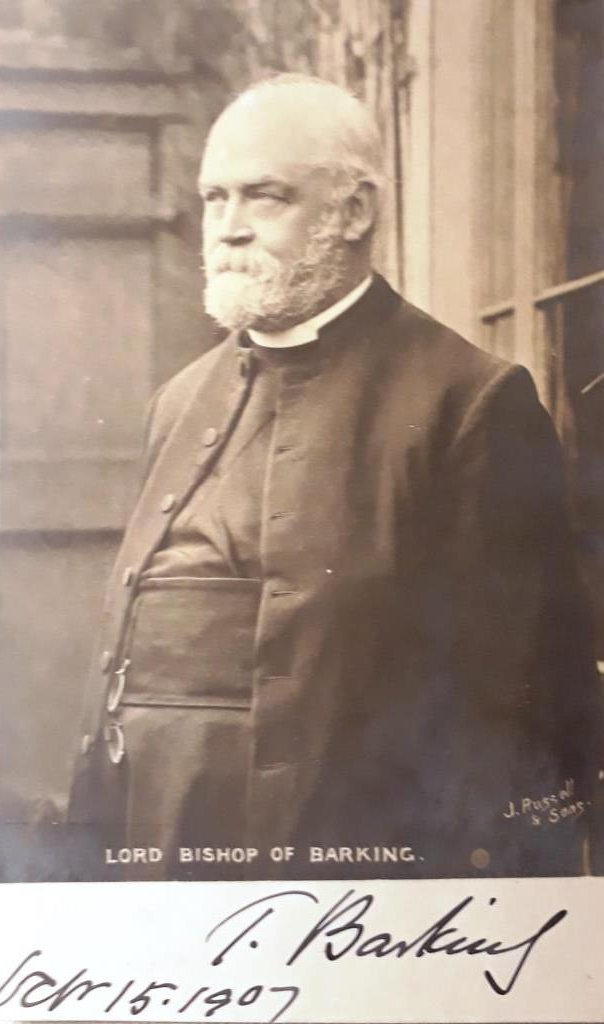
Rt Rev Thomas Stevens DD Lord Bishop of Barking (1907)

Thomas Stevens FSA (19 September 1841 – 22 August 1920) was an Anglican bishop, the first Bishop of Barking.

Stevens was born in Salisbury, the son of Thomas Ogden Stevens and his wife, Harriet Wansbrough. He was educated at Shrewsbury, Sherborne and Magdalene College, Cambridge. He received the degree of Doctor of Divinity from Magdalene College, Cambridge in May 1901. He was consecrated a bishop on 17 February 1901, at St Margaret's, Westminster, by Archbishop of Canterbury.

His first post was as an Assistant Master at Charterhouse. He then held incumbencies at St Luke, Victoria Docks, Saffron Walden and finally (before his elevation to the episcopate) Vicar of St John's, Stratford. He was appointed Suffragan Bishop of Barking in February 1901.

He married Anne Elisabeth Bertram, granddaughter of Sir George Clement Bertram, Bailiff of Jersey. Retiring in 1919, he died in Wymondham in 1920.

Stevens was a very active Freemason, initiated as a student in 1861 in Cambridge's Isaac Newton University Lodge. He became Provincial Grand Chaplain for Essex in 1885, and then in 1896 became the joint Grand Chaplain of the United Grand Lodge of England, serving jointly with the Bishop of Llandaff (Richard Lewis), and succeeding the Bishop of Barrow-in-Furness, the Rt Revd Henry Ware.

Church of England titles
Preceded by First incumbent	Bishop of Barking; 1901 – 1919	Succeeded by James Inskip
