= Richard Thorpe (priest) =

Richard Joshua Thorpe (born 13 May 1838 Hoghton; died 23 October 1920 Christchurch) was an Anglican priest in the second half of the 19th century and the first two decades of the 20th.

Thorpe was educated at Trinity College, Dublin and ordained in 1862. He served three curacies: at St John, Dublin (1861–1864); St Andrew the Less, Cambridge (1864-1866) and St John, Langley, Essex (1866–1867).He was at All Saints, Nelson from 1867 to 1878, where he was also archdeacon of Waimea and dean of New Zealand. He was then the incumbent of St Paul, Wellington.
