= Richard Turnbull (theologian) =

English theologian (1960–2025)

Richard Duncan Turnbull (17 October 1960 – 26 November 2025) was an English theologian and clergyman in the Church of England. He was the Principal of Wycliffe Hall, Oxford, an Evangelical Anglican theological college which is part of the University of Oxford from 2005 to 2012. From 2012 until 2025, he was the Director of The Centre For Enterprise, Markets and Ethics which he co-founded with Brian Griffiths.

== Education and career ==
Turnbull was born on 17 October 1960. He was educated at the University of Reading (BA 1982) and St John's College, Durham (BA first class theology 1992, PhD 1997). Turnbull became a member of the Institute of Chartered Accountants of Scotland in 1985. He also had an honorary Master of Arts degree from the University of Oxford in 2005.

He was ordained deacon in 1994 and priest in 1995. He served as assistant curate of Christ Church, Portswood (1994–1998) and vicar of Chineham (1998–2005).

Turnbull had also been a member of the General Synod of the Church of England (1995–2005), chairman of the Business Committee of the General Synod (2004–05) and chairman of working parties that produced reports on clergy pay and funding a theological education. He was a member of the Archbishops' Council of the Church of England (2003–2005) and chairman of the House of Clergy of the Diocesan Synod of the Diocese of Winchester (2000–2005).

Before his death, he had been undertaking research projects in Evangelical spirituality and the future of Evangelicalism. He was a member of the committee that drafted the document "A Covenant for the Church of England".

He was appointed Principal of Wycliffe Hall, Oxford in 2005. He taught courses on Anglicanism, Anglican and Evangelical Identity and the Reformation. He stepped down in June 2012 following a long-running dispute.

In 2007, Turnbull controversially told a conference that 95% of Britons would go to hell unless the message of the gospel was brought to them.

In 2010, Turnbull published a biography of Lord Shaftesbury.

From 2017, he had been a member of the board of trustees for the Christian Institute. From 2021, he served as the chair.

In 2025, Richard retired as Director of CEME to work on a book on Quaker Capitalism that was under contract with Cambridge University Press.

== Personal life and death ==
Turnbull was married to Caroline and they had four children.

Turnbull died on 26 November 2025, at the age of 65.

== Publications ==
- Anglican and Evangelical? (Continuum, 2007)
- 'Evangelicalism: the state of scholarship and the question of identity', Anvil 16:2 (1999)
- Eschatology and the Social Order: A Historical Perspective (Whitefield Institute Briefings 3:2, March 1998)
- 'Lord Shaftesbury', in Theologische Realenzyklopadie (1993)
- 'The emergence of the Protestant Evangelical Tradition', Churchman 107 (November 1993)

Academic offices
Preceded by Alister McGrath	Principal of Wycliffe Hall, Oxford; 2005–2012	Succeeded by Simon Vibert (acting)
