= Ric Thorpe =

British bishop and expert in church planting

The Most Reverend Ric Thorpe
- Archbishop of Melbourne
- Church: Anglican Church of Australia
- Province: Victoria
- Diocese: Diocese of Melbourne
- Installed: 30 November 2025
- Predecessor: Philip Freier
- Other post: Metropolitan of the Province of Victoria (2025)
- Previous posts: Bishop of Islington (2015-2025); Bishop of London's Adviser for Church Planting (2012–2015); Rector of St Paul's Church, Shadwell (2005–2015)

Orders
- Ordination: 1996 (deacon); 1997 (priest)
- Consecration: 29 September 2015 by Justin Welby

Personal details
- Born: Richard Charles Thorpe; 3 February 1965 (age 61)
- Spouse: Louie Thorpe
- Children: 3
- Education: University of Birmingham; Wycliffe Hall, Oxford

Richard Charles "Ric" Thorpe (born 3 February 1965) is a British Anglican bishop and church planter. Since November 2025 he has been Archbishop of Melbourne, Australia; previously he was the Bishop of Islington in the Diocese of London and the Church of England's "bishop for church plants".

== Early life ==
Thorpe was born on 3 February 1965. He was educated at Stowe School, a private school in Stowe, Buckinghamshire. He studied chemical engineering at the University of Birmingham and graduated with a Bachelor of Science (BSc) degree in 1987 and began working as a marketing manager with Unilever.

From 1990 to 1992, Thorpe was a lay worship leader at Holy Trinity Brompton (HTB) in the Diocese of London. In 1993, he entered Wycliffe Hall, an Evangelical Anglican theological college, to study theology and train for ordained ministry. He graduated from the University of Oxford with a Bachelor of Theology (BTh) degree in 1996.

== Ordained ministry ==
Thorpe was ordained in the Church of England: deaconed at Petertide 1996 (30 June) by Richard Chartres, Bishop of London at St Paul's Cathedral and priested the Petertide following (29 June 1997) by Michael Colclough, Bishop of Kensington at Holy Trinity Church, Hounslow. He began his ministry as a curate at Holy Trinity Brompton (HTB) in the Diocese of London. After almost 10 years of ordained ministry, he was chosen to lead a church plant from HTB to St Paul's Church, Shadwell. This involved moving 100 parishioners and a number of clergy from HTB to St Paul's to revitalise the church. He was appointed priest in charge of St Paul's with St James, Ratcliffe in 2005 and rector in 2010. From 2010 to 2014 he was also priest in charge of All Hallows, Bow. Thorpe was involved with a further four church plants.

From 2012 to 2015, he was the Bishop of London's Adviser for Church Planting. He was a tutor in church planting at St Mellitus College, an Anglican theological college, and leader of its church planting course. From 2015 until 2025, he led the Gregory Centre for Church Multiplication.

=== Episcopal ministry ===
In May 2015, it was announced that the See of Islington would be brought out of abeyance to create a "bishop for church plants". The bishop would be a suffragan bishop in the Diocese of London but would be free from territorial responsibilities and work with the whole Church of England. Thorpe was appointed to this role on 9 July 2015 and on 29 September was consecrated by Justin Welby, Archbishop of Canterbury, at St Paul's Cathedral.

On 24 May 2025, it was announced that Thorpe had been elected as the next Archbishop of Melbourne, Australia. His election was confirmed and he was installed on 30 November 2025 at St Paul's Cathedral, Melbourne.

=== Views ===
In 2023, following the news that the House of Bishops of the Church of England was to introduce proposals for blessing same-sex relationships, he signed an open letter which stated:

many Christians in the Church of England and the Anglican Communion, together with Christians from across the churches of world Christianity, continue to believe that marriage is given by God for the union of a man and woman and that it cannot be extended to those who are of the same sex. [...] Without seeking to diminish the value of many committed same-sex relationships, for which there is much to give thanks, we find ourselves constrained by what we sincerely believe the Scriptures teach which cannot be set aside.

During the Church of England's February 2023 General Synod meeting, Thorpe was one of four bishops to vote against the successful proposal to introduce blessings and prayers for same-sex relationships. He also voted against introducing "standalone services for same-sex couples" on a trial basis during a General Synod meeting in November 2023; the motion passed.

Church of England titles
In abeyance Title last held by Charles Turner	Bishop of Islington; 2015–present	Incumbent
