= William Gretton =

English academic (1736–1813)

William Gretton (1736–1813), was the master of Magdalene College, Cambridge.

Gretton was the second son of John Gretton, a retailer of Bond Street, London, and his wife Jane. Born in 1736, he was educated at St Paul's School and Peterhouse, Cambridge, where he graduated B.A. in 1758 and proceeded M.A. in 1761. Having taken holy orders in 1760, he served as curate of St Neots before obtaining the living of Littlebury, Essex, in 1761 and Saffron Walden, Essex, in 1766.

In 1784 Lord Howard de Walden, owner of Audley End House, appointed him his domestic chaplain. Gretton served as a JP for Essex and was made Archdeacon of Essex on 2 December 1795. In 1797 he was elected master of Magdalene College, Cambridge, and was vice-chancellor of Cambridge University in 1800-1. He died on 29 September 1813. His memorial is in the chapel of Magdalene College.

A later master of Magdalene College, the novelist A. C. Benson, borrowed Gretton's name for an officious college dean in his novel Watersprings.
