= Carew St John-Mildmay =

Archdeacon of Essex (1800–1878)

Carew St John-Mildmay (2 February 1800 – 13 July 1878) was Archdeacon of Essex from 18 February 1862 until his death.

The son of Henry St John-Mildmay, 3rd Baronet he was born at Dogmersfield Park. He was educated at Oriel College, Oxford. He held livings at Shorwell, Burnham-on-Crouch and Chelmsford.
