= Bishop of Islington =

Anglican suffragan bishop in England

The Bishop of Islington is an episcopal title used by a suffragan bishop of the Church of England Diocese of London, in the Province of Canterbury, England.

The title takes its name after Islington, an inner-city district of London, and the first suffragan bishop, who lived at Clapton Common, was simultaneously Rector of St Andrew Undershaft. Turner received responsibility for North London, which had hitherto been under the Bishops of Bedford and then of Stepney. Towards the end of his life, Turner slowly handed over his responsibilities due to ill health, but retained his See until death; between 1923 and 2015, the title remained in abeyance.

It was reported in 2015 that Richard Chartres, Bishop of London, had proposed to take the see out of abeyance for the appointment of a national "bishop for church plants", and this was confirmed on 1 May 2015. Ric Thorpe became Bishop of Islington from his consecration on 29 September; he vacated the See on 30 November 2025, upon his translation as Anglican Archbishop of Melbourne.

== List of bishops ==
Bishops of Islington
From	Until	Incumbent	Notes
1898	1923	Charles Turner	Suffragan for North London; died in post, having long retired from duties.
1923	2015	in abeyance	
29 September 2015	2025	Ric Thorpe	Translated to Melbourne
