= Church of St John the Baptist, Cirencester =

Church in Gloucestershire, England

Coordinates: 51°43′04″N 1°58′04″W

Church of St. John Baptist, Cirencester
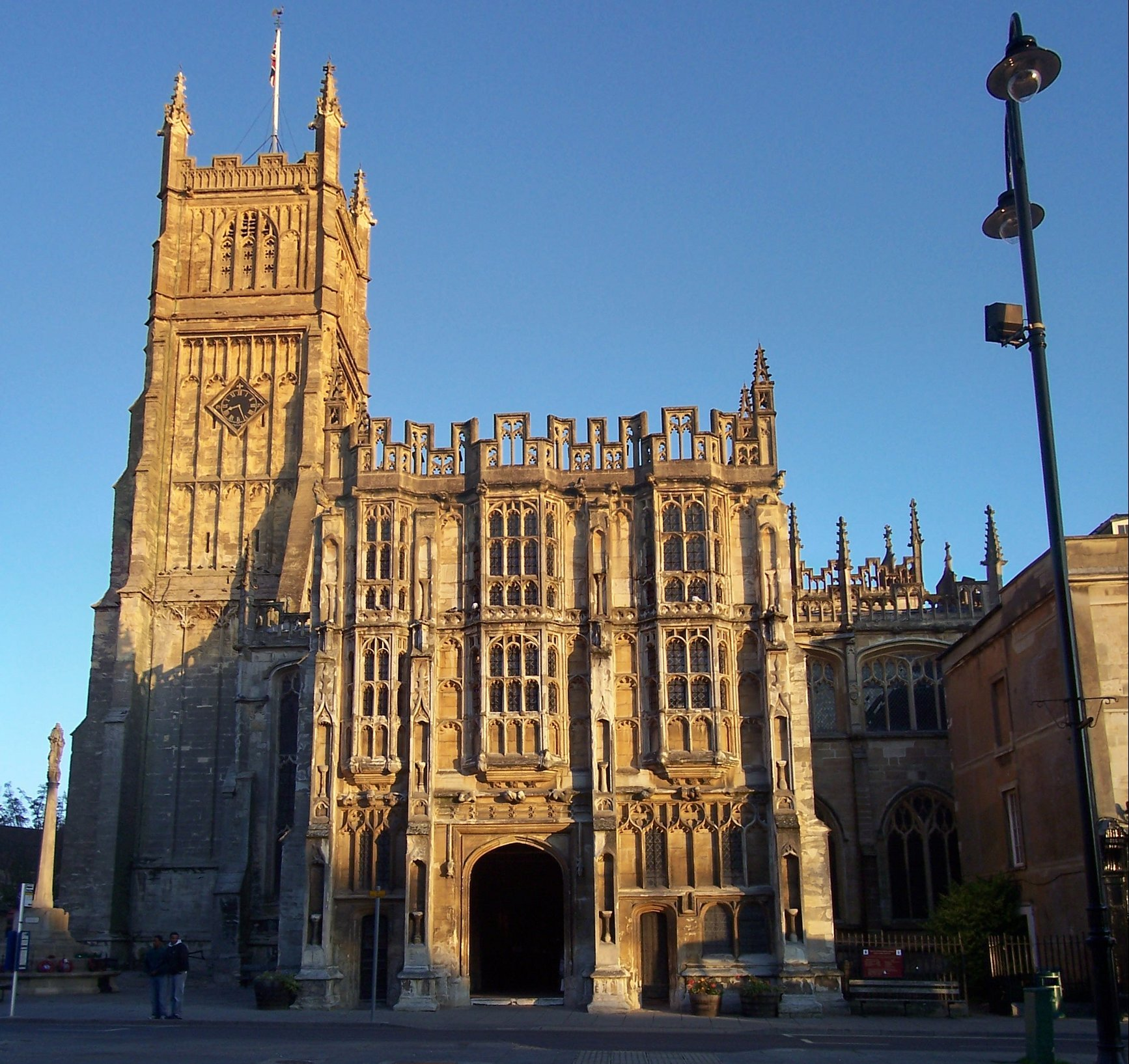
- Church of St. John Baptist, Cirencester
- Church of St. John Baptist, Cirencester
- Denomination: Church of England
- Churchmanship: Prayer Book Catholic
- Website: www.cirenparish.co.uk/

History
- Dedication: St John the Baptist

Administration
- Province: Canterbury
- Diocese: Gloucester
- Parish: Cirencester

Clergy
- Vicar: Rev'd Canon Graham Morris

The Church of St. John Baptist, Cirencester is a parish church in the Church of England in Cirencester, Gloucestershire, England. It is a Grade I listed building.

The building reflects architectural styles since the 12th century. The chancel and attached chapel represent the oldest part with the nave having been rebuilt twice and the tower added in the 15th century. The south porch was built by Cirencester Abbey around 1480 and only connected to the church in the 18th century.

It is built of Cotswold stone and is one of the "largest parish churches in England". It contains various tombs and monuments with some fragments of medieval stained glass and wall paintings.

== History ==
The church is medieval. It is renowned for its perpendicular porch, fan vaults and merchants' tombs.

The chancel is the oldest part of the structure, and construction of the current church started in the 12th century on the site of an earlier Saxon one. It was widened in about 1180. Around 1240 the nave was completely rebuilt. The east window dates from around 1300. The original stained glass of the east window has long since disappeared and it is now filled with fifteenth century glass from other parts of the church.

To the north of the chancel is St. Catherine's Chapel which dates from around 1150. It contains a wall painting of St. Christopher carrying the Christ Child, and vaulting given by Abbot John Hakebourne in 1508 when major reconstruction took place funded by the wool trade making it an example of a Wool church. To the north of St. Catherine's Chapel is the Lady Chapel, first built in 1240 and extended in the 15th century. The tower was built and supported by buttresses around 1400.

The Trinity Chapel dates from 1430 to 1460 and was endowed for a priest of the nearby Abbey to say masses for the souls of Kings and Queens. It contains a squint which enabled the priest to synchronise the celebration of mass with that at the high altar. The nave was completely rebuilt between 1515 and 1530 and is a remarkable example of late Perpendicular Gothic architecture. The tower is fifteenth century and remarkable for the large buttresses which shore it up at its junction with the nave. The great south porch which adjoins the market place was built around 1500 at the expense of Alice Avening. It is elaborately decorated. It was built by Cirencester Abbey around 1480, as an administrative centre and only connected to the church in the 18th century. Between the dissolution of the monasteries and its connection to the church it was used as the town hall. The nave was again rebuilt between 1516 and 1530.

In 1642 the church was used to imprison local citizens overnight after the skirmishes in the town during the English Civil War.

During the 1860s George Gilbert Scott led a team undertaking a Victorian restoration to strengthen the church, which included moving many of the bodies interred under the nave to the Lady Chapel. This reduced the level of the floor and introduced sub floor voids. These were investigated during alterations carried out in 2008 and 2009, which discovered evidence of the various periods of the church's construction.

In 2019 a design competition was started to commission statues for niches on the church wall, to replace those removed and lost in 1963.

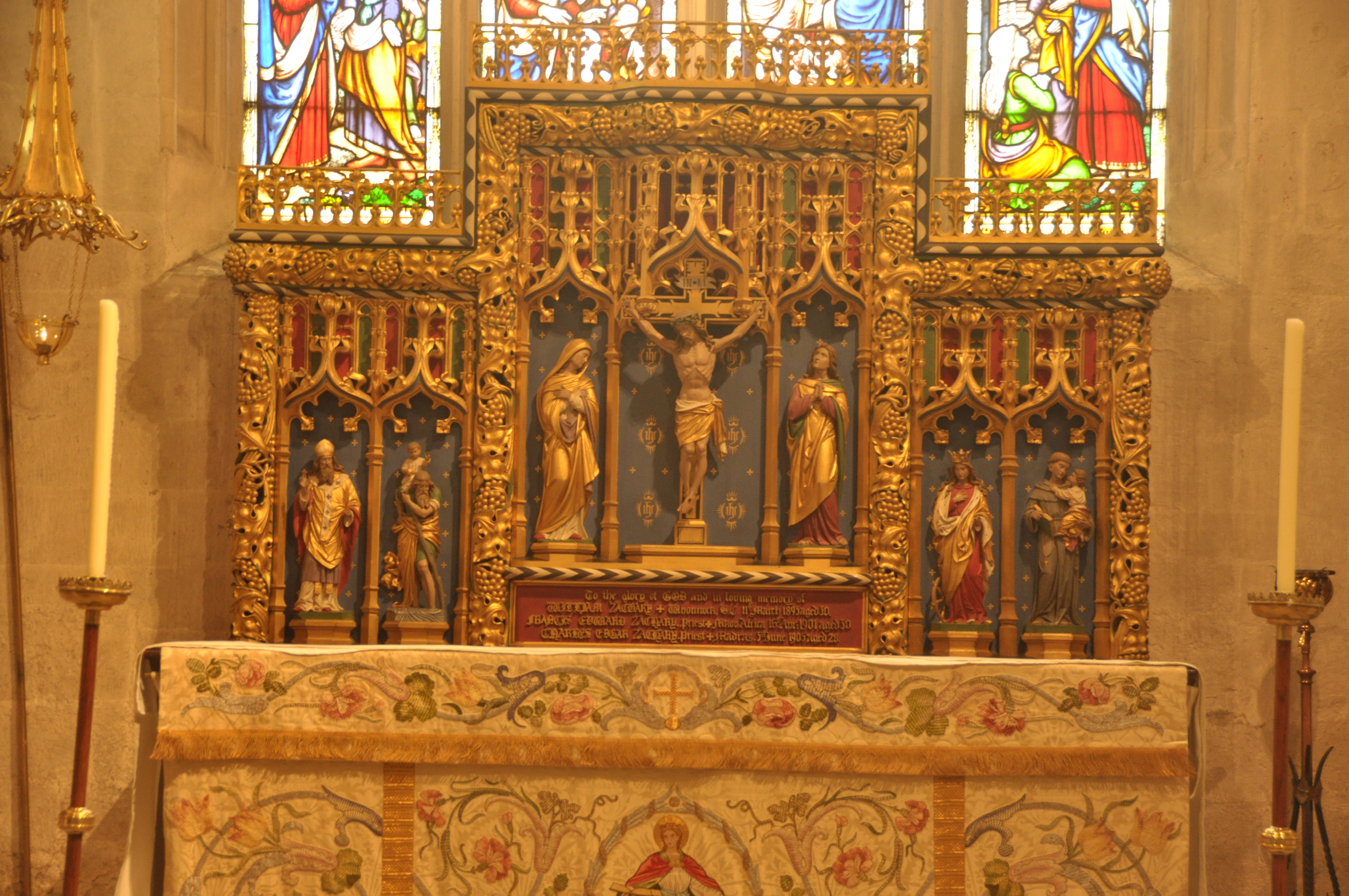
The altar

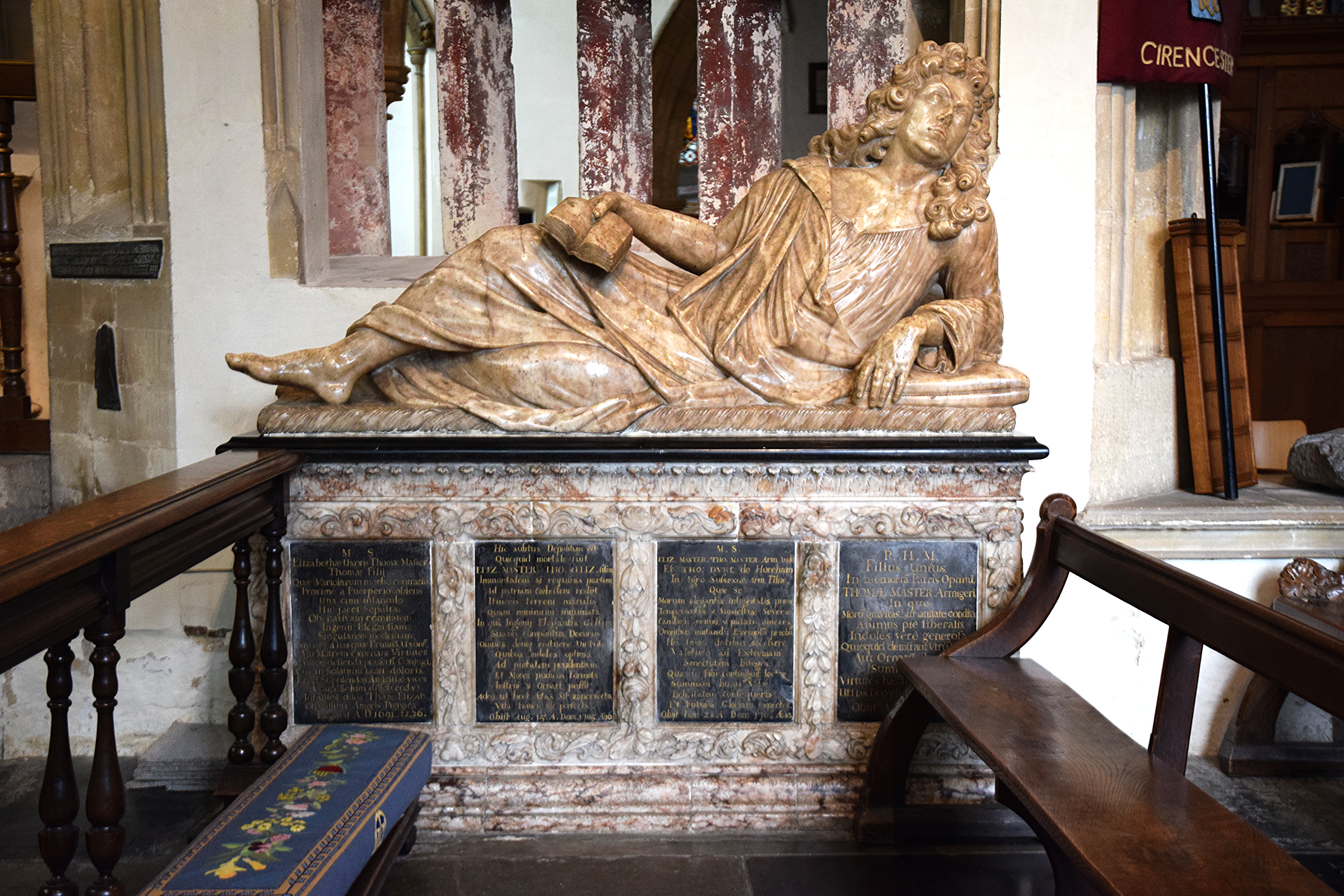
The tomb of Thomas Master (d:1680) in the Lady Chapel

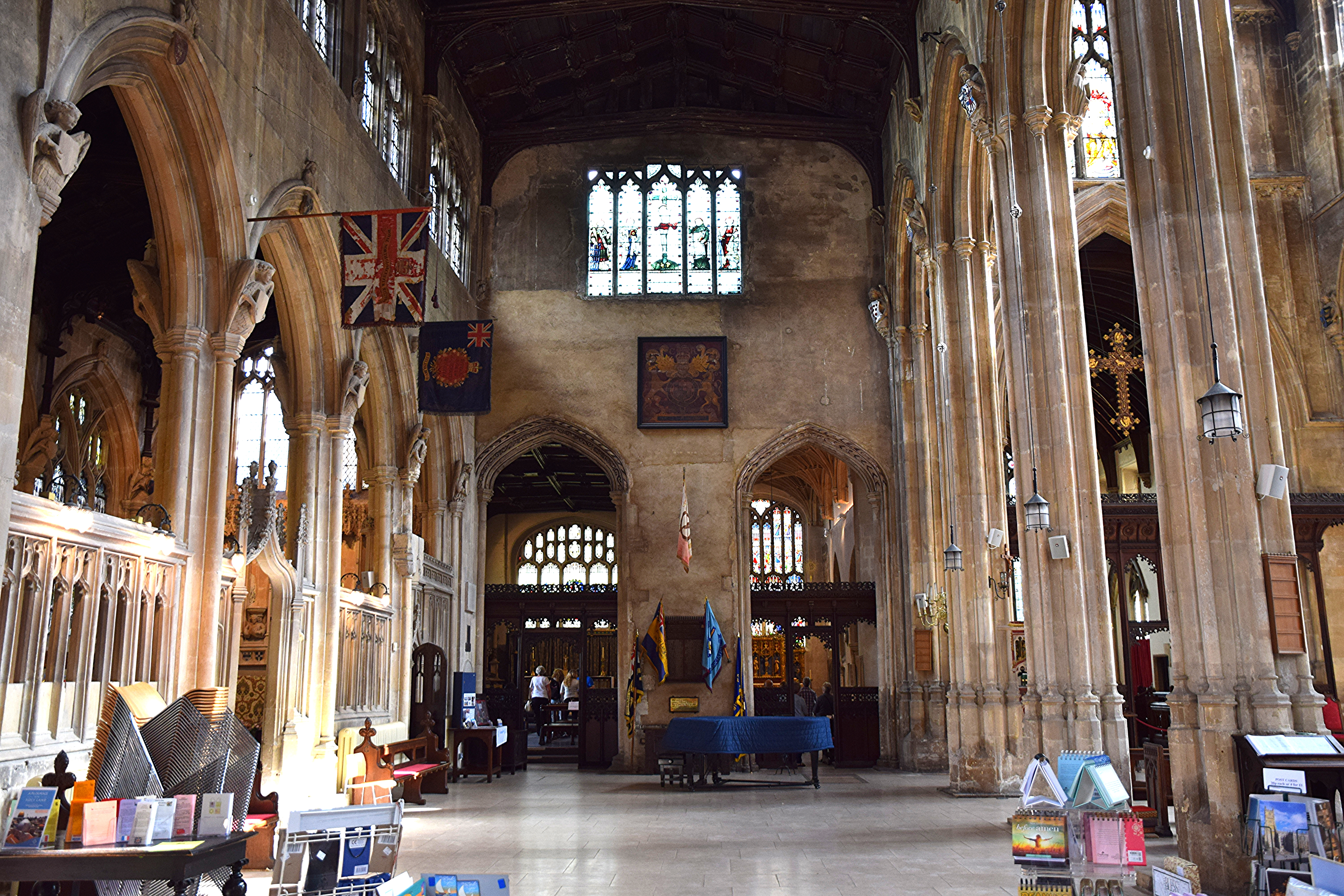
The north aisle

== Architecture and fittings ==
The Cotswold stone church is 180 feet (55 m) long and 104 feet (32 m) wide. The three-stage buttressed tower is 134 feet (41 m) high. This makes it one of the "largest parish churches in England".

The layout of the church includes a three-bay chancel and three-bay aisled nave. The nave includes arcades of tall piers with carved angels at the tops supporting arches and windows. The west tower houses bells which have been added to and recast, mostly by Rudhall of Gloucester, over the centuries.

The three-storey south porch has carved oriel windows and crenellated parapets topped by decorative pinnacles. The interior is a profusion of panelling in the chambers.

The pulpit dates from the 15th century. The octagonal font was carved in the 14th century. It was returned to the church in the 19th century after it had been discovered in the abbey grounds. The brass chandeliers were made in Bristol in 1701.

There are several stained glass windows. Some of these include fragments of medieval glass but are largely 18th century by Hardman & Co. The east windows of the chancel and south chapel were built around 1300.

There are some surviving fragments of wall paintings particularly in St Catherines chapel, and a wide variety of tombs and monuments. The silver gilt "Boleyn Cup" was made in 1535 for Anne Boleyn and given to the church by Elizabeth I.

=== Organ ===
The church possesses a pipe organ built by Father Willis in 1895 with a case by George Gilbert Scott. It was renovated by Rushworth and Dreaper in 1955 and rebuilt by Harrison & Harrison in 2009.

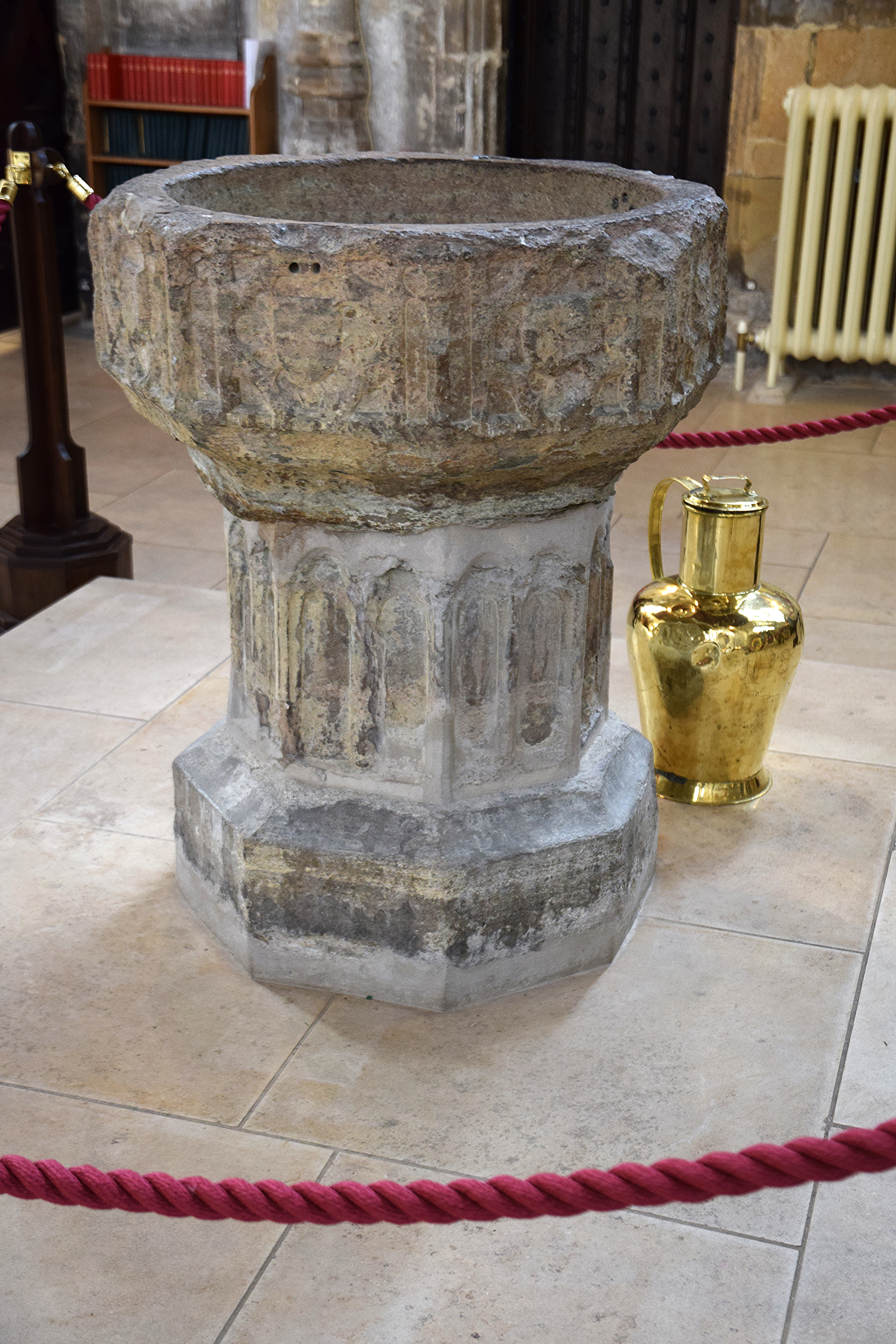
The font

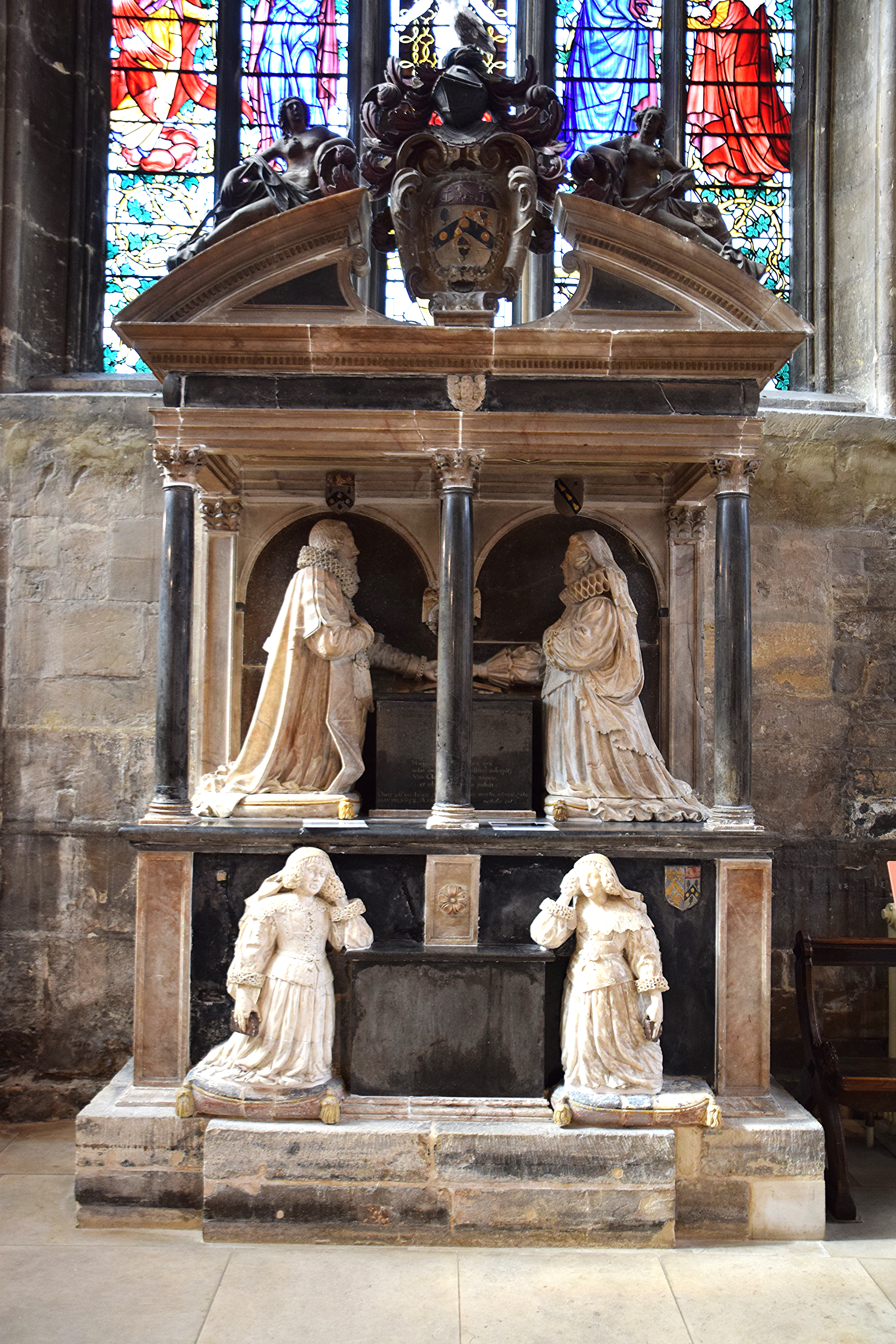
Monument to George Monax (d:1638)

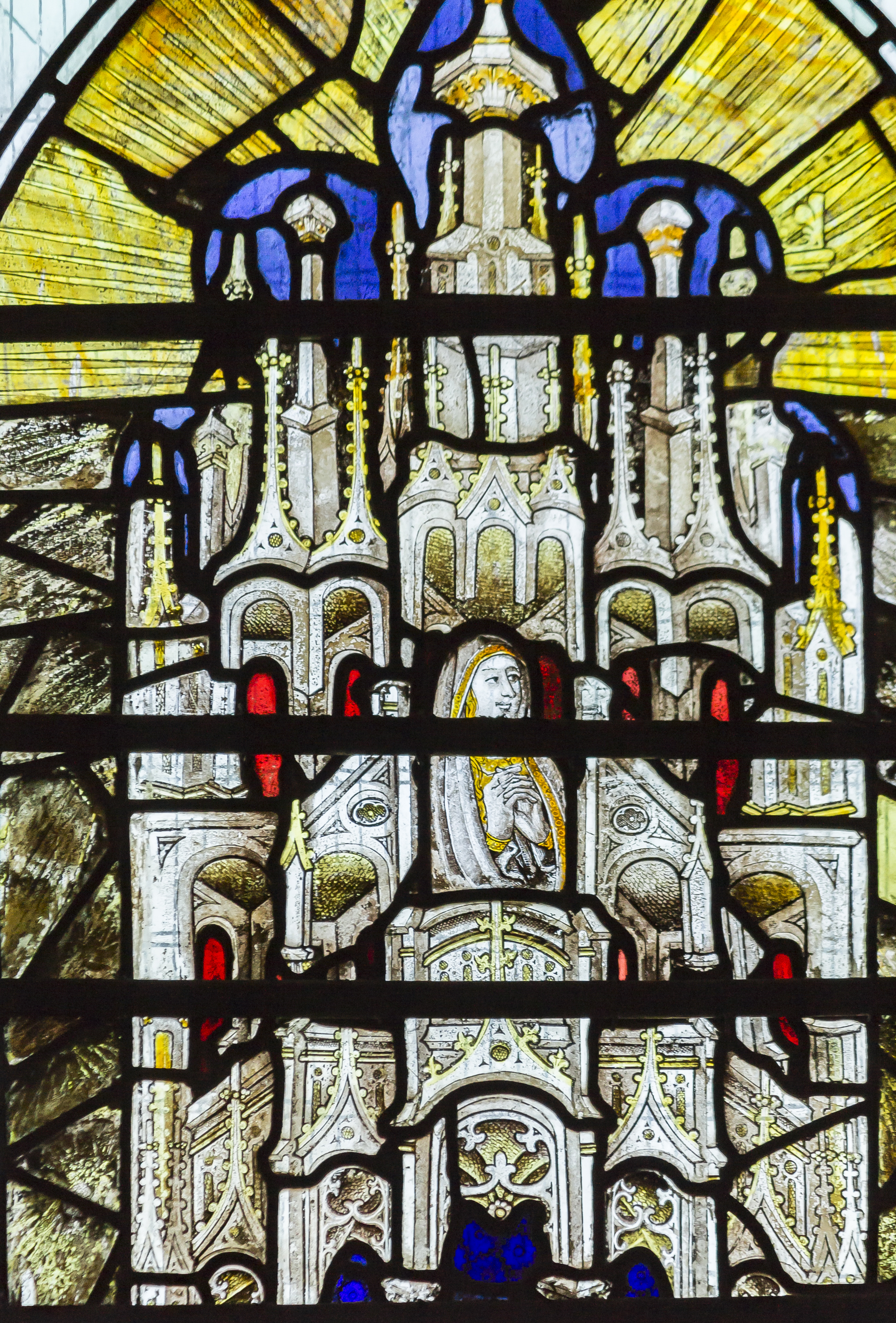
Stained glass in the east window

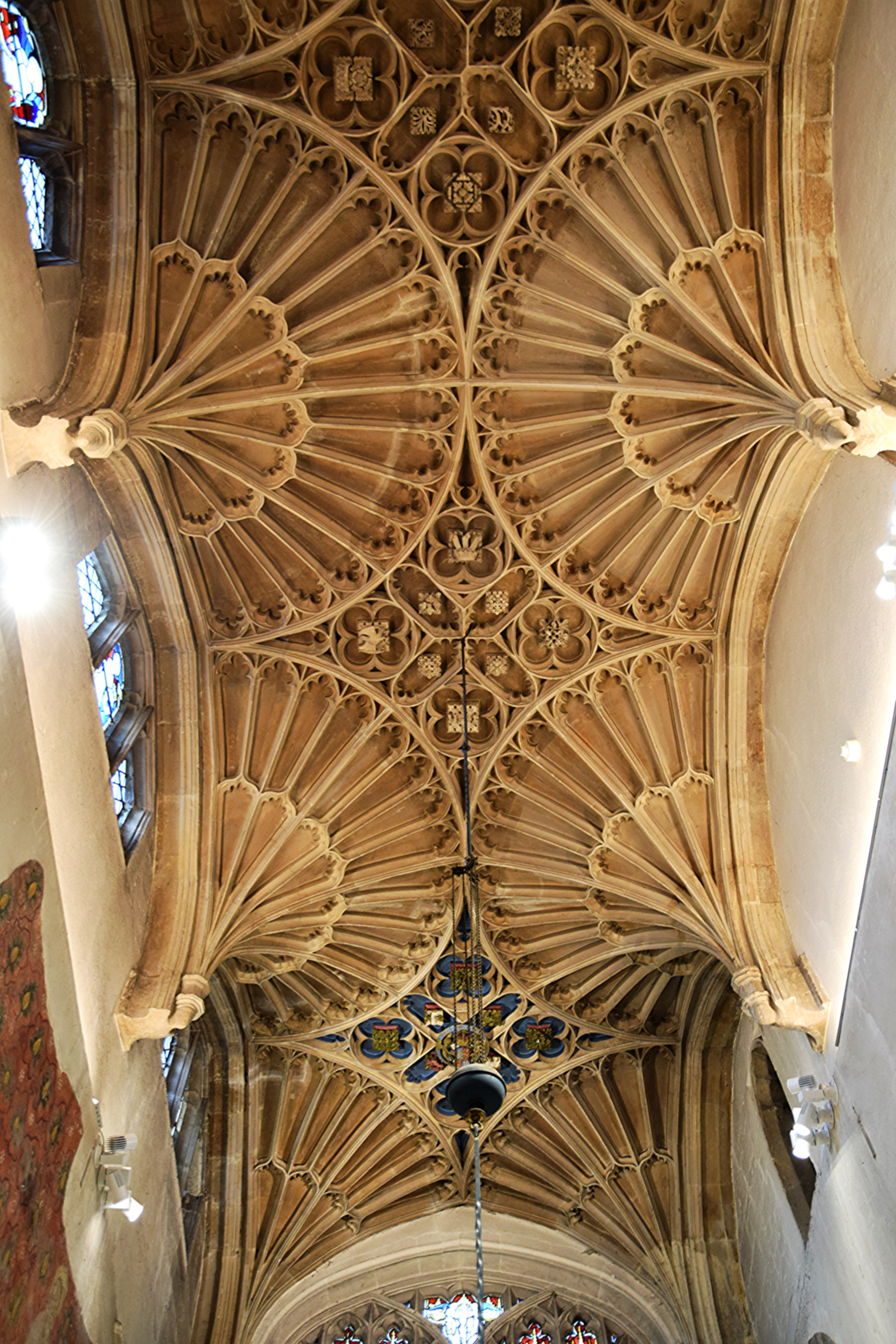
Fan vaulting of St. Nicholas's & St. Katherine's Chapel

== Parish status ==
The church is in the combined parish which includes: Holy Trinity Church, Watermoor and St. Lawrence, Chesterton.

== Record of incumbents ==
- Thomas Marshall 1558
- Thomas Perpointe 1562
- William Aldsworth 1574
- Thomas Woodlande 1578
- John Mortimer 1580
- John Stone 1581
- Philip Jones 1586
- Henry Bishop 1587
- Robert Butler 1592
- Heymo Leigh 1594
- Richard Dyer 1610
- John Burgoyne 1616
- Alexander Gregory 1632
- Thomas Carles 1663–1675†
- Jeremiah Gregory 1675–1690 (son of Alexander Gregory)
- Joseph Harrison 1690–1753†
- Samuel Johnson 1753–1778
- Martin Stafford Smith 1778–1789
- William Shippen Willes 1789–1806
- Henry Anthony Pye 1806–1839†
- William Frederick Powell 1839–1868
- James Ogilvy Millar 1869–1881
- Henry Rudge Hayward 1881–1898 (as Archdeacon of Cirencester from 1883)
- John Stewart Sinclair 1898–1908 (appointed Archdeacon of Cirencester)
- William Aubrey Robins 1909–1922 (later Archdeacon of Bedford)
- Lewis Westmacott 1922–1940
- Ronald Huntley Sutch 1941–1962 (as Archdeacon of Cheltenham from 1951)
- Rowland Edward Hill 1962–1978
- John Arthur Lewis 1978–1988 (appointed Archdeacon of Cheltenham)
- Hedley Ringrose 1988–1998 (appointed Archdeacon of Cheltenham)
- Michael St. John-Channell 1999–2006
- James Butterworth 2006–2008
- Leonard Doolan 2008–2017
- Graham Morris 2018–
