= Dean of Hereford =

Position in the Church of England

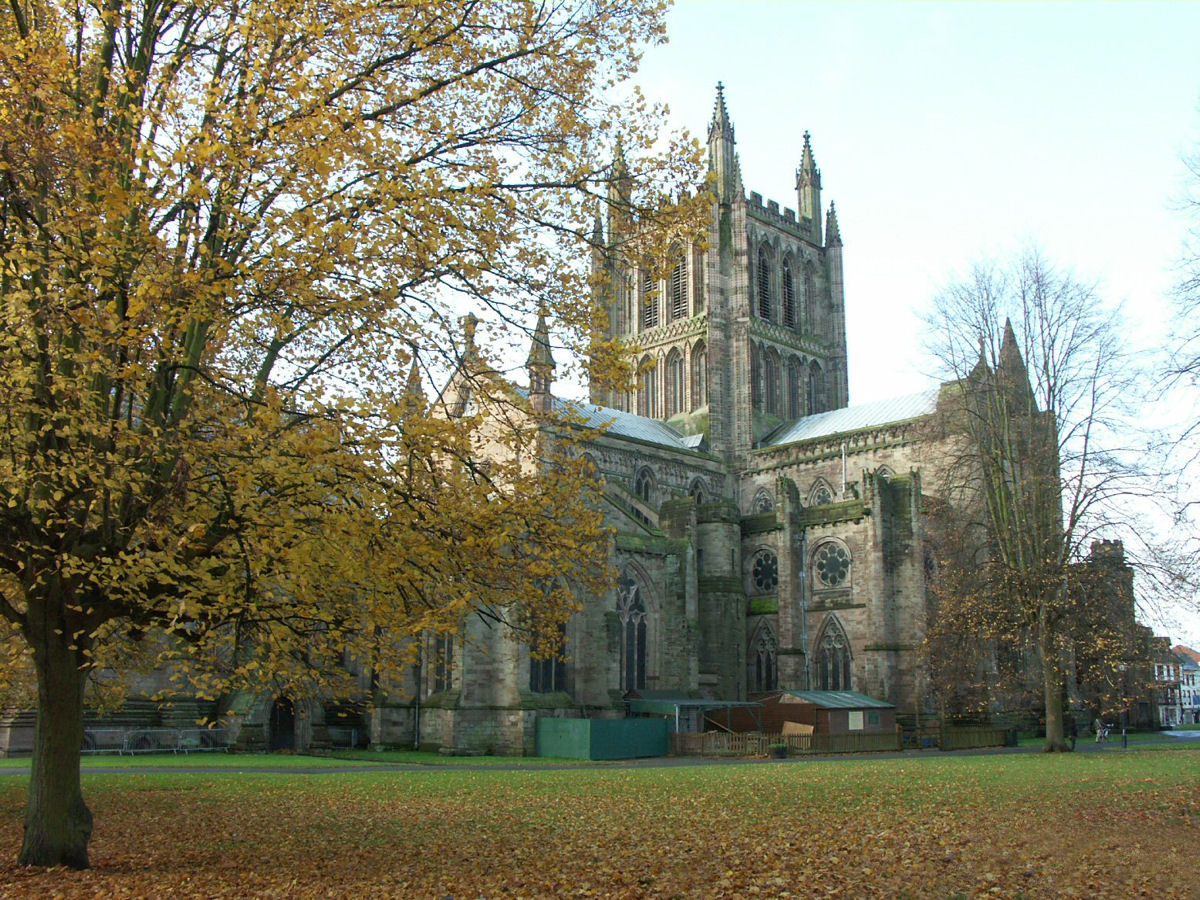
Hereford Cathedral

The Dean of Hereford is the head (primus inter pares – first among equals) and chair of the chapter of canons, the ruling body of Hereford Cathedral. The dean and chapter are based at the Cathedral Church of Blessed Virgin Mary and St Ethelbert in Hereford. The cathedral is the mother church of the Diocese of Hereford and seat of the Bishop of Hereford.

== List of deans ==
=== High Medieval ===
- 1140 Ralph
- 1150 Geoffrey
- 1157 Ralph
- 1173 Geoffrey
- c. 1187 Richard
- 1202 Hugh de Breusa
- 1207–1216 Hugh de Mapenor
- 1216 Henry
- 1218–1231 Thomas de Bosebir
- 1231–1234 Ralph de Maidstone
- 1234–? Stephen Thorne
- 1247–1262 Ancelin or Anselm
- 1271–1278 Giles de Avenbury
- 1278–1320 Jean de Aigueblanche

=== Late Medieval ===
- 1320–1352 Stephen de Ledebury
- 1352–1361 Thomas Trilleck
- 1361 William de Feriby
- 1363–? William Bermingham
- ?–1380 John de Middleton
- 1380–1393 John Harold
- 1393–1407 John Prophet
- 1407–1417 Thomas Felde
- 1422 John Bagshaw
- ?–1434 John Stanwey
- 1434–1445 Henry Shelford
- 1446–1462 John Berew
- 1463–1481 Richard Pede
- 1481–1490 Thomas Chaundler
- 1491–1491 Oliver King
- 1491–1501 John Hervey

=== Early modern ===
- 1503–? Reginald West
- 1512–1512 Thomas Wolsey
- 1513–1529 Edmund Frowcester
- 1529–1541 Gamaliel Clifton
- 1541–1555 Hugh Curwen
- 1558–1559 Edmund Daniel
- 1560–1576 John Ellis
- 1577–1593 John Watkins
- 1593–1607 Charles Langford
- 1607–1616 Edward Doughtie
- 1616–1617 Richard Montagu

(exchanged with Lloyd)

- 1617 Oliver Lloyd
- 1617–1624 Silvanus Griffiths
- 1623–1631 Daniel Price
- 1631–1636 John Richardson
- 1637–1643 Jonathan Browne
- 1644–1661 Herbert Croft
- 1661–1672 Thomas Hodges
- 1672–1692 George Benson
- 1692–1706 John Tyler

(afterwards Bishop of Llandaff 1706)

- 1706 Robert Clavering
- 1729–1736 John Harris
- 1736–1748 Edward Cresset

(afterwards Bishop of Llandaff 1748)

- 1749 Edmund Castle
- 1750–1756 John Egerton
- 1756-1771 Francis Webber
- 1771-1808 Nathan Wetherell

=== Late modern ===
- 1808 William Leigh
- 1809-1820 George Gretton
- 1820 Robert Carr
- 1827 Edward Mellish
- 1831 Edward Grey
- 1832 John Merewether
- 1850–1867 Richard Dawes
- 1867–1894 George Herbert
- 1894–1919 Wentworth Leigh
- 1919–1946 Reginald Waterfield
- 1947–1961 Hedley Burrows
- 1961–1968 Robert Price
- 1969–1981 Norman Rathbone
- 1982–1992 Peter Haynes
- 1993–2000 Robert Willis
- 2002–2021 Michael Tavinor
- 2021 Andrew Piper (acting)
- 2021–present: Sarah Brown

== Sources ==
- British History Online – Fasti Ecclesiae Anglicanae 1066–1300 – Deans of Hereford
- British History Online – Fasti Ecclesiae Anglicanae 1300–1541 – Deans of Hereford
- s: Page:Fasti ecclesiae Anglicanae Vol.1 body of work.djvu/519
- s: Page:Fasti ecclesiae Anglicanae Vol.1 body of work.djvu/520
- s: Page:Fasti ecclesiae Anglicanae Vol.1 body of work.djvu/521
