= Frederick Sears =

Fred, Freddie or Frederick Sears may refer to:

- Frederick W. Sears (1859–1934), American neurologist and academic
- Frederick Sears (priest) (1871–1955), English Archdeacon of Cheltenham
- Fred F. Sears (1913–1957), American film director
- Freddie Sears (born 1989), English footballer
