= George Herbert (priest) =

Anglican priest

The Very Reverend The Honourable George Herbert
- Dean of Hereford
- Church: Church of England
- In office: 1867 – 1894
- Predecessor: Richard Dawes
- Successor: James Wentworth Leigh

Orders
- Ordination: 1850 (priest)

Personal details
- Born: George Herbert; 25 November 1825 Welshpool, Wales
- Died: 15 March 1894 (aged 68) Hereford, England
- Denomination: Anglicanism
- Parents: Edward Herbert, 2nd Earl of Powis; Lady Lucy Graham
- Spouse: Elizabeth Beatrice Sykes
- Children: Mary Hussey; Winifred Herbert
- Education: Eton College; St John's College, Cambridge

Hon. George Herbert (25 November 1825 – 15 March 1894) was an Anglican priest. A son of Edward Herbert, 2nd Earl of Powis, he was dean of Hereford.

== Early life ==
Herbert was born at Welshpool, Montgomeryshire, on 25 November 1825. He was a younger son of Edward Herbert, 2nd Earl of Powis and Lady Lucy Graham (the daughter of James Graham, 3rd Duke of Montrose).

He was educated at Eton College and St John's College, Cambridge. At Cambridge, he was president of the University Pitt Club.

== Tragedy ==
In 1848 George accidentally shot his father, Edward Herbert, 2nd Earl of Powis, while on a family shoot. The Earl died from his wounds 10 days later. This cruel turn of fate reputedly earned him the nickname "Bag-dad". Queen Victoria made note in her journal:

Tue 18th Jan 1848 ... Poor Ld. Powis has died in the most melancholy way. The whole party were out shooting & his 3rd son accidentally shot his father in the thigh. At 1rst he went unwell, but unfortunately mortification set in, & he died. It is too dreadful for the unfortunate son.

== Career ==
Herbert was ordained in 1850, and began his ministry as a curate at St Mary's, Kidderminster. Five years later he became vicar of Clun. In 1867 he was appointed to the deanery of Hereford Cathedral, a post he held until his death.

== Personal life ==
In 1863, Herbert was married to Elizabeth Beatrice Sykes, fourth daughter of Sir Tatton Sykes, 4th Baronet and Mary Anne Foulis (second daughter of Sir William Foulis, 7th Baronet). Together, they were the parents of:

- Mary Anne Herbert (d. 1942), who married Major William Clive Hussey, son of Edward Hussey and Hon. Henrietta Sarah Windsor-Clive (daughter of Hon. Robert Clive), in 1898.
- Winifred Lucy Elizabeth Herbert (d. 1948), who died unmarried.

Herbert died at the Deanery in Hereford on 15 March 1894.

== Notes ==
Church of England titles
| Preceded by Richard Dawes | Dean of Hereford; 1867–1894 | Succeeded by James Wentworth Leigh |
