= Edward Long Fox =

Edward Long Fox may refer to

- Edward Long Fox (psychiatrist) (1761–1835), English psychiatrist
- Edward Long Fox (physician) (1832–1902), English physician
