= John Merewether =

English churchman, Dean of Hereford and antiquary

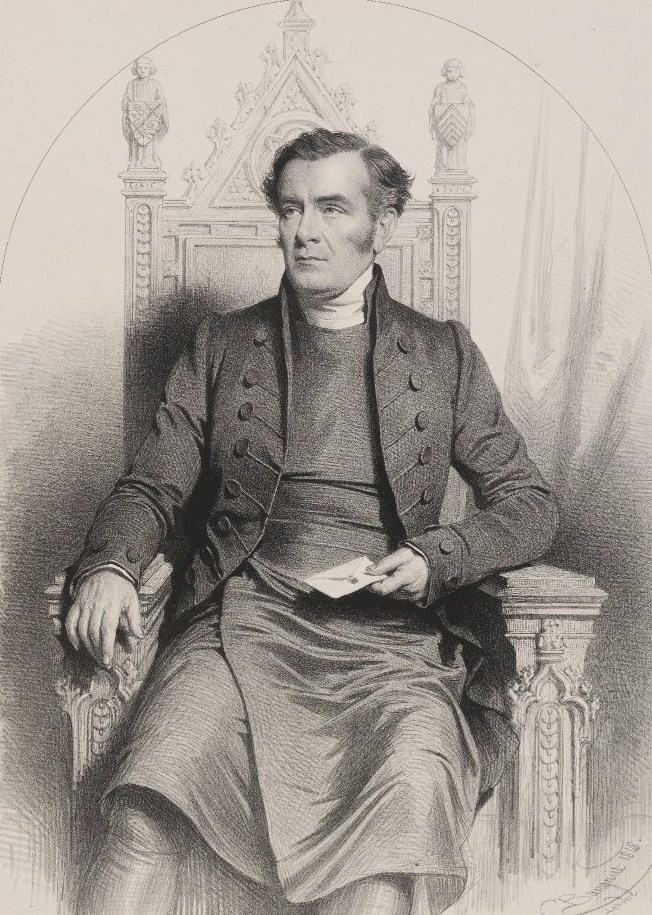
- John Merewether, 1848 engraving by Charles Baugniet.
- Born: 1797; Marshfield, Gloucestershire
- Died: 4 April 1850; Madeley, Shropshire vicarage
- Education: The Queen's College, Oxford
- Occupation: Dean of Hereford
- Known for: antiquary

John Merewether (1797 – 4 April 1850) was an English churchman, Dean of Hereford from 1832, known also as an antiquary.

== Early life ==
The son of John Merewether of Blackland, Wiltshire, he was born at Marshfield, Gloucestershire, in 1797. He matriculated from The Queen's College, Oxford, on 18 October 1814, graduated B.A. in 1818, and B.D. and D.D. in 1832. He was ordained priest in 1820 by the Bishop of Salisbury, and served curacies at Gillingham, Dorset, and Hampton, Middlesex.

== Preferment ==
While at Hampton Merewether was instrumental in building a chapel of ease at Hampton Wick, and attracted the notice of the Duke of Clarence, from 1830 King William IV, who was then residing at Bushey. He was chaplain to the Duchess of Clarence, the future Queen Adelaide of Saxe-Meiningen, in 1824. In 1828, he was presented by the Lord Chancellor to the living of New Radnor, and in 1832, on the promotion of the Hon. Edward Grey as bishop, Merewether succeeded him as Dean of Hereford. The Hereford chapter needed much reform; but with a personality described as "arrogant and ambitious", Merewether became embroiled in conflict.

On 13 January 1833, William IV appointed Merewether one of the deputy clerks of the closet, and asked Lord Melbourne to have a care for his advancement. In 1836, he was instituted to the vicarage of Madeley, Shropshire, but was then passed over as vacancies on the episcopate arose.Robert Peel as Prime Minister disregarded, when reminded of it, William IV's dying wish that Merewether should become a bishop.

In 1847, Merewether was a strenuous opponent of the election of Renn Dickson Hampden as Bishop of Hereford. After a fruitless memorial to the queen, he announced to Lord John Russell as prime minister, in a long letter (22 December), his intention of voting against Hampden's election in the chapter meeting; and received in reply the laconic note: "Sir, I had the honour to receive your letter of the 22nd inst. in which you intimate to me your intention of violating the law." Merewether finally refused to affix the seal of the dean and chapter to the document recording the bishop's formal election.

== Antiquarian ==
Merewether was elected Fellow of the Society of Antiquaries of London in 1836, and communicated to Archæologia accounts of discoveries made during the restoration of Hereford Cathedral. In 1838, he became a Fellow of the Royal Society. In 1843 he issued a Statement on the Condition and Circumstances of the Cathedral Church of Hereford, with notes on the effigies and illustrations of the condition of the structure.

He was an active member of the Archæological Institution, and did work in Wiltshire, recorded by the posthumous publication in 1851 Diary of a Dean: being an Account of the Examination of Silbury Hill and of various Barrows and other Earthworks on the Downs of North Wilts. The plates illustrating human remains, flint implements, pottery, etc., are from Merewether's own drawings. An energetic but crude archaeologist, Merewether in four weeks in 1849 had excavations made in 33 round barrows, West Kennet Long Barrow, and Silbury Hill.

== Death ==
Merewether died at Madeley vicarage on 4 April 1850, and was buried in the lady-chapel of Hereford Cathedral. The five lancet windows at the east end of the minster were fitted with stained glass to his memory with the inscription In Memoriam Johannis Merewether, S.T.P. ecclesiæ Heref. decani, quo strenuo fautore huius sacræ ædis restitutio feliciter est inchoata.

== Family ==
By his wife Mary Ann Baker, of Wiley, Wiltshire, Merewether had six sons and three daughters. Mrs. Merewether died on 17 June 1879, aged 71.

He was great grandfather to Dr Edward Merewether.

He was the brother-in-law of the organist, composer and church musician Samuel Sebastian Wesley
