= Archdeacon of Cheltenham =

Church of England ecclesiastical office

The Archdeacon of Cheltenham is a senior cleric in the Diocese of Gloucester who is responsible for some pastoral care and discipline of clergy in the Cheltenham archdeaconry.

The archdeaconry was created as the Archdeaconry of Cirencester in the Diocese of Gloucester & Bristol on 8 December 1882 from parts of the Gloucester and Bristol archdeaconries. When Gloucester & Bristol diocese was re-divided in 1897, Cirencester archdeaconry remained part of the Gloucester diocese. On 1 August 1919, the archdeaconry's boundaries were altered and it was renamed the Archdeaconry of Cheltenham.

The archdeaconry consists of the deaneries of Cheltenham, Cirencester, North Cotswold, and Tewkesbury & Winchcombe. Almost all of its parishes lie within the ceremonial county of Gloucester, the exceptions being Cirencester's Marston Meysey and Castle Eaton, both in Wiltshire.

== List of archdeacons ==
Archdeaconry created as Archdeaconry of Cirencester in Gloucester & Bristol Diocese in 1882.

- 1883 – 1908: Henry Hayward

Archdeaconry allocated to the new Diocese of Gloucester when Gloucester & Bristol diocese divided in 1897.

- 1908 – 30 April 1919 (d.): John Sinclair
- 1919 – 1919 (res.): Reginald Waterfield (afterwards Dean of Hereford, 1919)

During Waterfield's tenure, the archdeaconry was reconfigured and renamed Cheltenham archdeaconry.

- 1920 – 1924 (res.): George Gardner
- 1924 – 9 June 1932 (d.): Alan Cornwall
- 1932–1943: Frederick Sears
- 1943 – 1951 (ret.): Edmund Murray
- 1951 – 1965 (ret.): Ronald Sutch (afterwards archdeacon emeritus)
- 1965 – 1976 (ret.): George Hutchins (afterwards archdeacon emeritus)
- 1975 – 1988 (res.): Eric Evans (afterwards Dean of St Paul's, 1988)
- 1988 – 1998 (ret.): John Lewis (afterwards archdeacon emeritus)
- 1998 – 31 December 2009 (ret.): Hedley Ringrose
- 2010 – 30 November 2016 (res.): Robert Springett (became Bishop of Tewkesbury)
- 11 March 2017 – 31 December 2024 (res.): Phil Andrew
- 30 March 2025 – present: Katrina Scott
