= National Temperance League =

National Temperance League may refer to:

- Anti-Saloon League (now, American Council on Addiction and Alcohol Problems), organization of the temperance movement in the United States
- National Temperance League (Great Britain), temperance organization founded in 1856
