= Simon Burrows =

English bishop (1928–2015)

The Right Reverend Simon Burrows
- Bishop of Buckingham
- Diocese: Oxford
- In office: 1974–1994
- Predecessor: Christopher Pepys
- Successor: Colin Bennetts
- Other posts: Area bishop of Buckingham (1984–1994); Honorary assistant bishop in Winchester (1994–2015)

Orders
- Ordination: 1954 (deacon); 1955 (priest)
- Consecration: 1974

Personal details
- Born: 8 November 1928
- Died: 5 August 2015 (aged 86)
- Denomination: Anglican
- Parents: Hedley & Joan Lovett
- Spouse: Janet Woodd (m. 1960)
- Children: 2 sons; 3 daughters
- Education: King's College, Cambridge

Simon Hedley Burrows (8 November 1928 – 5 August 2015) was the Bishop of Buckingham from 1974 to 1994 and the first area bishop under the diocesan area scheme of 1984.

== Early life ==
Burrows was born on 8 November 1928. He was the grandson of Leonard Burrows (Bishop of Sheffield) and Neville Lovett (Bishop of Salisbury) and son of Hedley Burrows (Dean of Hereford). He was educated at Eton and King's College, Cambridge.

== Ordained ministry ==
He was made a deacon at Michaelmas 1954 (26 September), by Cyril Easthaugh, Bishop of Kensington, and ordained a priest the Michaelmas following (25 September 1955), by William Wand, Bishop of London — both times at St Paul's Cathedral. He served his curacy at St John's Wood, after which he was Chaplain of Jesus College, Cambridge. Following this he was Vicar of Wyken and then (his final appointment before his ordination to the episcopate) of Holy Trinity Fareham. He was consecrated a bishop on 18 October 1974 by Michael Ramsey, Archbishop of Canterbury, at Westminster Abbey.

In retirement he continued to serve as an assistant bishop in the Diocese of Winchester for some time.

== Death ==
He died on 5 August 2015 due to illness.

Church of England titles
| Preceded by Christopher Pepys | Bishop of Buckingham; 1974–1994 | Succeeded by Colin Bennetts |
