= St George's Church, Modbury =

St George’s Church, Modbury
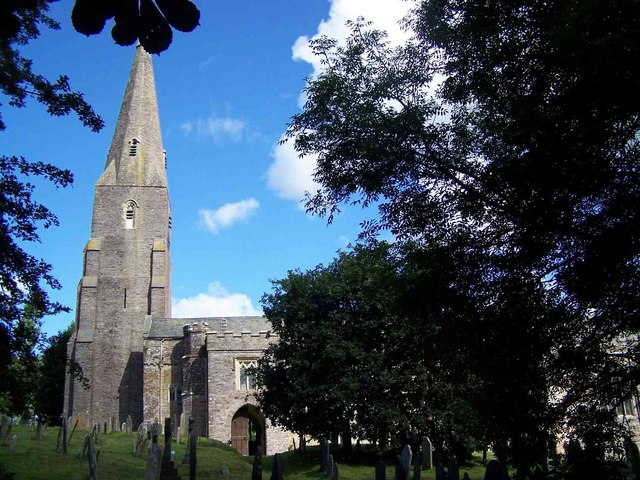
- St George’s Church, Modbury
- St George’s Church, Modbury
- 50°20′55″N 3°53′26″W
- OS grid reference: SX 65599 51549
- Country: England
- Denomination: Church of England
- Website: modburyteam.org/st-georges-church-modbury

History
- Status: Active
- Dedication: St George

Architecture
- Heritage designation: Grade I listed

Administration
- Diocese: Diocese of Exeter
- Archdeaconry: Archdeaconry of Totnes
- Deanery: Totnes
- Benefice: Modbury, Bigbury, Ringmore, Kingston & Aveton Gifford
- Parish: Modbury

St George’s Church, Modbury is a Grade I listed Church of England parish church in Modbury, Devon.

== History ==
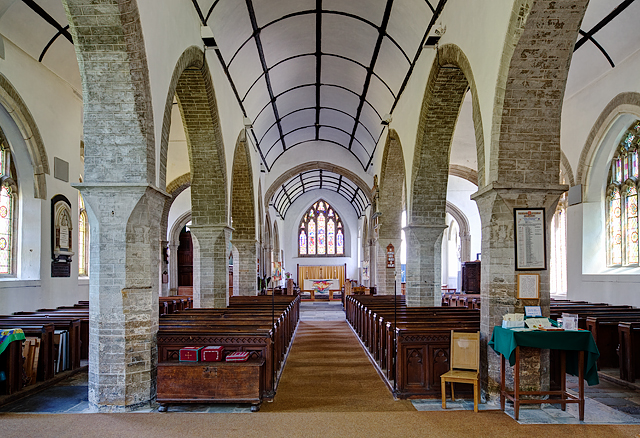
The interior of the church

The church was formerly a dependency of Modbury Priory. The main parts of the church date from the early 14th century It was said to have been struck by lightening in 1621 and rebuilt but it retains the style of its early 14th century predecessor accurately.

The tower has angle buttresses and a broach spire believed to have been rebuilt as a copy of the original after 1621. The nave has a wagon roof, as do the aisles and transepts, the Lady Chapel, the Vestry, and the chancel. Dendrochronological analysis suggest the church was reroofed in the sixteenth century.

Between 1923 and 1925 restoration works were undertaken on the stonework and the spire. The large west window had several portions of perished stone repaired. A new oak reredos designed by Harbottle Reed of Exeter with a painting of the Crucifixion was installed.

The spire was restored in 1938.

The church was placed on Historic England's Heritage at Risk Register in 2013 with concerns about roof damage and damp. A 2015 Heritage Lottery Fund grant led to an extensive programme of roof repairs and restoration.

== Memorials ==
The church contains memorials to the Champernowne and Prideaux families. There is also an acrostic tombstone to Oliver Hill of Shillston, dated 1563.

== Organ ==
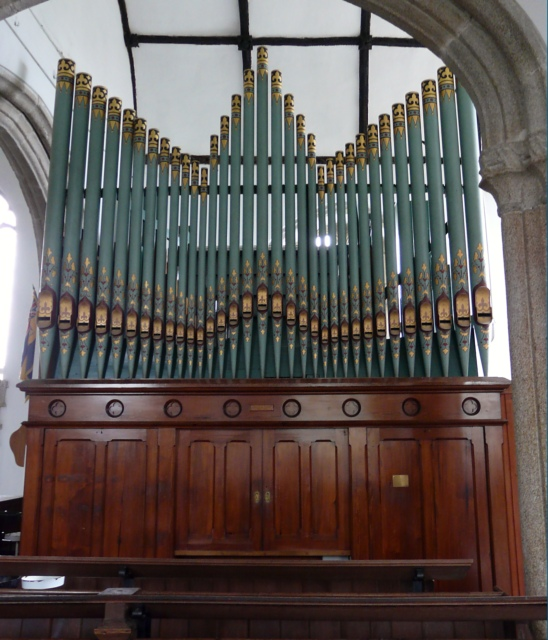
The organ of 1873

The organ was built by Forster and Andrews of Hull and installed in 1873. It comprises 2 manuals and pedals with 17 speaking stops. A specification of the organ can be found on the National Pipe Organ Register.

== Bells ==
The ring of six bells was recast in 1806 by Thomas Castleman Bilbie with a tenor weight of 892 kilograms (1,967 lb). They sound in the key of E flat. As part of the tower and spire restoration in the 1930s, the bells were rehung on a new frame at a cost of £300. The ring was dedicated by the Bishop of Exeter on 29 January 1936 with a muffled peal in respect to the recent death of King George V.

== Clock ==
In 1705, Ambrose Hawkins of Exeter made a turret clock for the church. It is very similar to the clock preserved in St Saviour's Church, Dartmouth.
