= Peter Haynes =

Peter Haynes may refer to:

- Peter Haynes (mathematician) (born 1958), British mathematician
- Peter Haynes (priest) (1925–2018), Anglican priest
- Peter Haynes (footballer) (born 1982), Australian association football player
