= Michael Tavinor =

English Anglican priest (born 1953)

Michael Edward Tavinor (born 11 September 1953) is a retired English Anglican priest who served as Dean of Hereford from 2002 to 2021.

He was educated at Durham University, Emmanuel College, Cambridge (PGCE 1976), and King's College London and ordained after a period of study at Ripon College Cuddesdon in 1983. He was a Curate at St Peter's Church, Ealing and then Precentor at Ely Cathedral and whilst Precentor was also Priest in charge at Holy Cross, Stuntney. He then became Vicar of Tewkesbury Abbey. In 2002 he was appointed to the Hereford Deanery. In September 2020, Tavinor announced he would resign from his post as the Dean of Hereford on 28 February 2021.

Church of England titles
| Preceded by Robert Willis | Dean of Hereford; 2002–2021 | Succeeded by Sarah Brown |
