= George Gretton (priest) =

George Gretton (6 July 1754 in Norton in Hales – 29 July 1820 in Hereford) was an Anglican priest in the late 18th and early 19th centuries.

He was educated at Repton and Trinity College, Cambridge. He held livings at Townstal (St Saviour's Church, Dartmouth), Hedsor and Upton Bishop. He was Dean of Hereford from 1809 until his death.

== Notes ==
Church of England titles
Preceded by William Leigh	Dean of Hereford; 1809–1820	Succeeded by Robert Carr
