= George Gardner (priest) =

George Lawrence Harter Gardner (1 September 1853 – 20 September 1925) was an eminent Anglican priest in the first quarter of the twentieth century.

Gardner was born on 1 September 1853, educated at Cheltenham College and Corpus Christi College, Cambridge, and ordained in 1875. After a curacy at St. Mary's, Nottingham he was the incumbent at All Saints, Cheltenham until 1911. From then until 1920 he was Diocesan Chaplain to the Bishop of Birmingham; and Archdeacon of Aston from 1913. His last post was Archdeacon of Cheltenham.

He died on 20 September 1925.

Church of England titles
Preceded by Walter Hobhouse	Archdeacon of Aston; 1913–1920	Succeeded by Harold Richards
Preceded by Reginald Waterfield	Archdeacon of Cheltenham; 1920–1924	Succeeded by Alan Whitmore Cornwall
