= Henry Rudge Hayward =

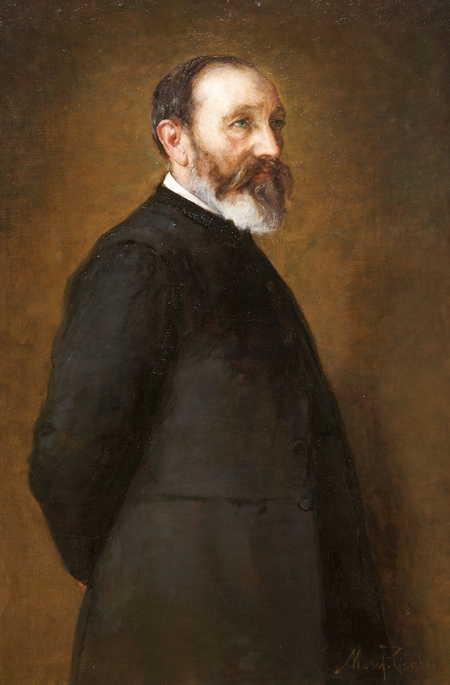
- Born: February 1831; Wantage, Berkshire, England
- Died: 17 December 1912; Christchurch, Dorset

Henry Rudge Hayward (February 1831 – 17 December 1912) was Archdeacon of Cheltenham from 1883 to 1908.

== Education ==
Hayward was educated at John Roysse's Free School in Abingdon-on-Thames (now Abingdon School) which he attended as a boarder from August 1840 until 1849; and Pembroke College, Oxford, matriculating in 1849 and graduating B.A. 1853, M.A. 1856. He was a scholar from 1849 to 1858 and a fellow from 1858 to 1864. He was ordained in 1855.

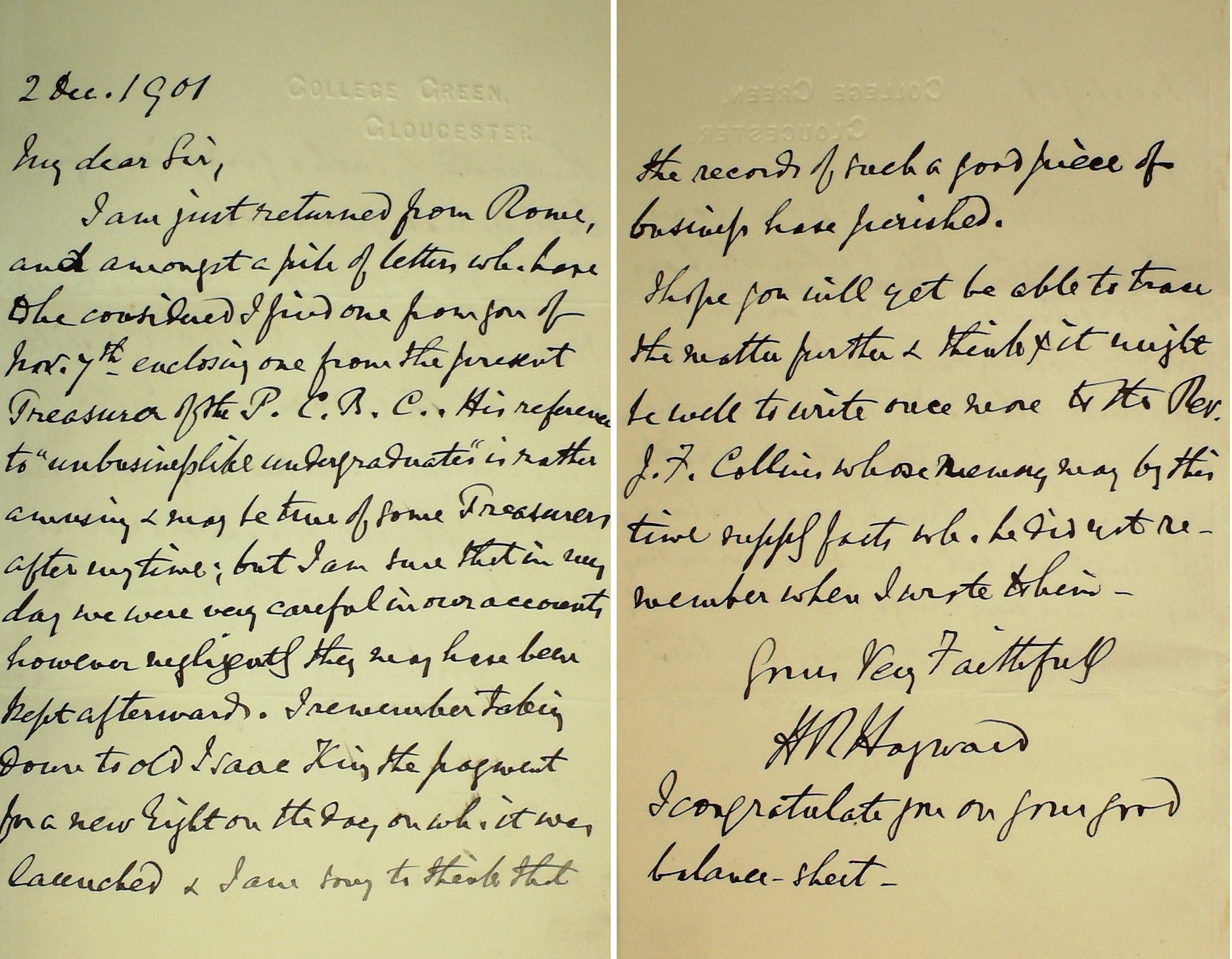
A letter dated 1901 from Hayward to Abingdon School, regarding memories of rowing

== Career ==
After a curacy in Marlow, he held incumbencies in Fawley, Lydiard Millicent from 1864 to 1881 and Cirencester from 1881 to 1898. He was a Residentiary Canon at Gloucester Cathedral from 1898 to March 1912, when he resigned because of ill health. He died in December 1912.

He married Isabella Elizabeth Bucknall-Estcourt, daughter of Rev. Edmund Hiley Bucknall-Estcourt and sister of Lord Lord Estcourt.

== See also ==
- List of Old Abingdonians

Church of England titles
New title	Archdeacon of Cheltenham; 1883–1908	Succeeded by John Stewart Sinclair
