= Ladies' National Temperance Convention of 1876 =

The Ladies' National Temperance Convention of 1876 was a temperance movement women's conference promoted by the National Temperance League. The convening occurred in London, United Kingdom, on 22-24 May 1876, with Lady Jane Harriet Ellice presiding. No permanent organisation was subsequently created.

== History ==
Previous efforts of this kind had been promoted by the League. In May 1853, at a conference held in a London drawing room, a Ladies' Temperance Society was formed, which issued an address to the women of England, and was the means of establishing 22 societies, at Birmingham, Canterbury, Gloucester, Liverpool, Leeds, Peterborough, Reigate, Reading, Spalding, Worcester, and other places. This society was succeeded, in 1860, by the Ladies National Association for the Promotion of Temperance, which was carried on for several years in direct connection with the League, by Mrs. William Fison (Fanny Whitaker Fison; 1815–1892), who attended numerous drawing-room meetings in different parts of the country, and awakened an interest in the temperance cause in influential circles that had not previously been reached by any other agency.

A large and influential "Conference of Ladies", convened by the League, was held at the Cannon Street Hotel, in May 1868. This conference brought on great interest, and the papers were published in a volume, Woman's Work in the Temperance Reformation, with an Introduction by Mrs. S. C. Hall.

During the years that had elapsed since the Conference of 1868 was held, the Committee of the National Temperance League benefited from the cooperation of women in several important departments of their work-notably in the Army by Miss Robinson, and in the Navy by Miss Weston, and they endeavored in a variety of ways to enlist the sympathies of women in the campaign against intemperance. Of the numerous women's meetings held from time to time, none seem to have been so thoroughly successful as those which were addressed by members of the medical profession.

The proposal to have a national conference of ladies in 1876 originated in Northern England, through Mrs. John Whiting, of Leeds, who requested the Committee of the National Temperance League to undertake the labour and expense of convening the Conference, and they agreed to do so. The preliminary arrangements were decided upon at a meeting of representatives from existing women's temperance associations.

== Proceedings ==
The Convention was opened on Monday, 22 May 1876, at the Memorial Hall, by Lady Jane Harriet Ellice, who delivered an address, and read letters on "Alcohol in relation to Health," from Sir Henry Thompson and Dr. Benjamin Ward Richardson. A paper on the same topic was then read by Miss Firth, President of the London Association of Nurses. A public meeting of women was held on the same evening, in the Large Memorial Hall, which was presided over by Mrs. Lucas.

The second sitting of the Convention, on Tuesday morning, 23 May, was devoted to the consideration of "The Drinking Customs, Domestic and Social," under the presidency of Mrs. Whiting, of Leeds.

"Spheres of Effort for Individual Workers" was the subject considered at the third sitting of the Convention, on Tuesday afternoon. Mrs. Fielden Thorp presided.

The concluding session of the Conference, on Wednesday morning, 24 May, was presided over by Mrs. Balfour, and devoted to the consideration of "Ladies' Temperance Associations, Local and National." Some discussion took place upon a proposal to proceed at once with the formation of a National Association; but the following Resolution, moved by Miss Hastings, was ultimately agreed to:—

"That the following ladies are requested to take the papers read by Mrs. Parker and Mrs. Dawson Burns into consideration, and to report upon them to a future Meeting:-Lady Jane Ellice, Mrs. Whiting, Mrs. F. Thorp, Miss Mason, Mrs. Balfour, Miss Firth, Mrs. Dawson Burns, Mrs. Clayton, Miss Battersby, Miss Ricketts, Miss Ellis, Miss White, Mrs. Beattie, Miss E. Webb, Miss Cadbury, Mrs. Lucas, Mrs. Hind Smith, Mrs. Richardson, Mrs. Hilton, Miss Wilson, Miss Mawson, Mrs. Scholefield, Mrs. Sturges."
