= Ambrose Hawkins =

English 18th century clockmaker

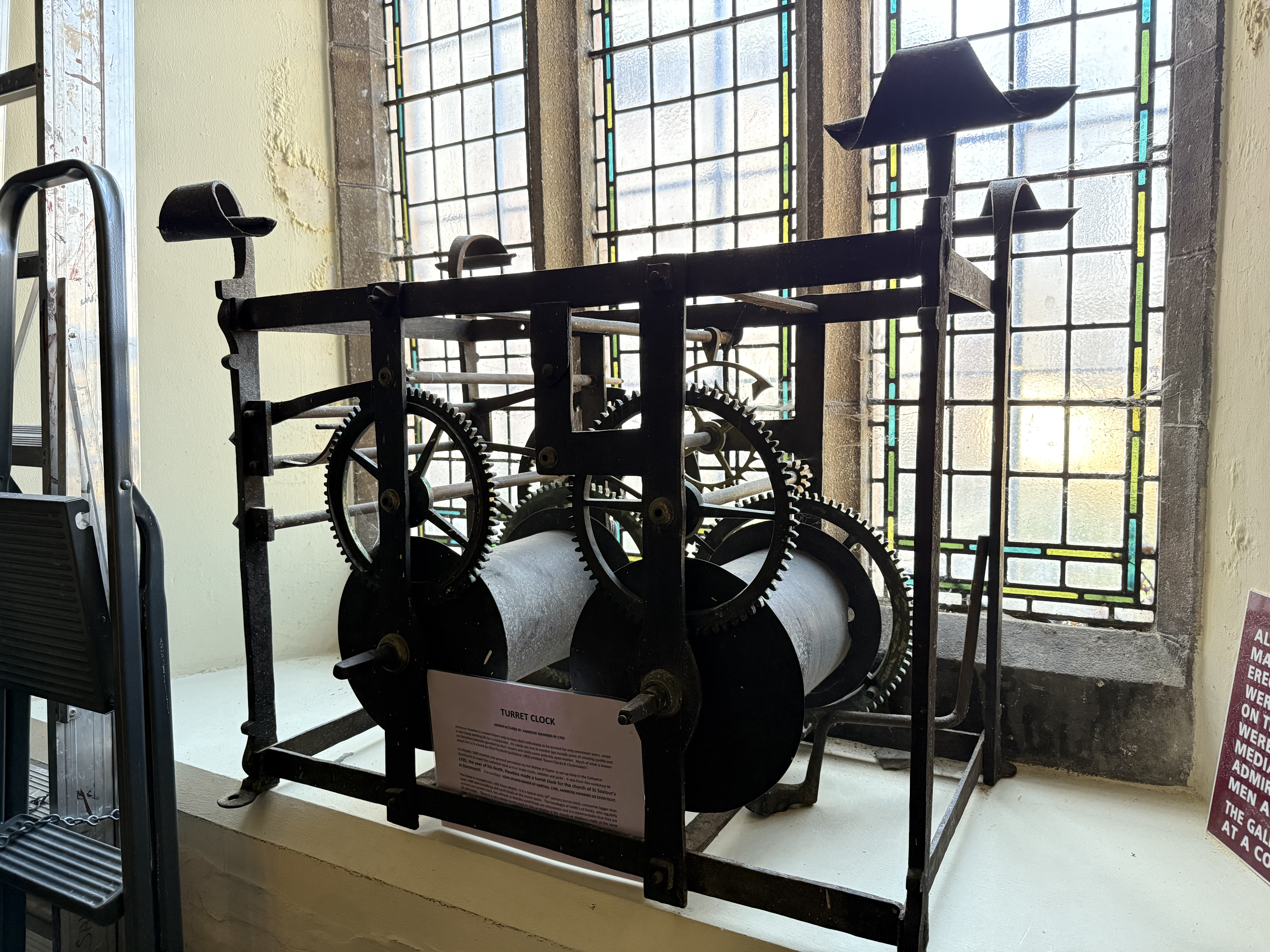
Turret Clock for St Saviour's Church, Dartmouth

Ambrose Hawkins (died 1705) was a clock maker in Somerset and Devon.

The earliest record of him is in the register of St Cuthbert's Church, Wells. He and his wife Ann are listed as the parents of a daughter Elizabeth. By 1695 Hawkins had moved to Exeter. At St Martin's Church, Exeter the parish records contain the baptism of three sons. Their children were:

- Elizabeth Hawkins (b. 15 August 1690)
- Henry Hawkins (b. 7 October 1695)
- Thomas Hawkins (b. 17 January 1697)
- Ambrose Hawkins (b. 29 August 1699)

In 1696 he was granted the right to set up shop in the Exeter Cathedral precincts by the Bishop of Exeter Rt. Revd. Jonathan Trelawny;

I doe hereby Grant and Give Liberty and Priviledge to Ambrose hawkens to Open and Keepe Shopp in ye Churchyard of our Cathedral's Church of St. Peters Exon, Wherein to Worke and make Clocks, Watches and Jacks.............First day of May, 1696.

Later that year an agreement was drawn up for Hawkins to mend and care for the Exeter Cathedral astronomical clock for the sum of £17 (equivalent to £2,800 in 2025).

He produced long case clocks some of which occasionally come up for sale and command high prices. A clock with a tree train movement and one month's duration, a quarter striking mechanism on six bells was advertised in Country Life on 6 September 1973 for a price of £9,500 (equivalent to £103,300 in 2025). In 2005 a long case clock was sold by Christie's for £36,000 (equivalent to £63,700 in 2025) and in 2014 another clock sold at Bonhams for £12,500 (equivalent to £17,300 in 2025).

He was buried in Exeter Cathedral on 11 August 1705.

== Turret Clocks ==
- St Saviour's Church, Dartmouth 1705
- St George's Church, Modbury 1705
