= Oliver Lloyd =

Welsh priest and lawyer (d. 1625)

Oliver Lloyd (or Lloyde) (1570 or 1571 – 1625) was a Welsh Anglican priest and lawyer who became Dean of Hereford Cathedral.

== Life ==
Lloyd was born in Montgomeryshire, Wales, in 1570 or 1571 and matriculated at St Mary Hall, Oxford in 1589 at the age of 18. He was made a Fellow of All Souls College and obtained his Bachelor of Civil Law degree in 1597, with a Doctor of Civil Law degree following in 1602. He was later to become a benefactor of Jesus College. In 1609, he became an advocate of Doctors' Commons. He achieved swift advancement as a clergyman, becoming Rector of Clynnog Fawr in Caernarfonshire, north Wales, Chancellor of Hereford Cathedral and Canon of Windsor in 1615. Two years later, he became Dean of Hereford, holding the position until he died in 1625.
