= Edmund Murray (priest) =

British Archdeacon (1877–1969)

Edmund Theodore Murray (16 August 1877 – 16 February 1969) was Archdeacon of Cheltenham from 1943 to 1951.

Murray was educated at Uppingham School and Christ's College, Cambridge, and ordained after a period of study at Leeds Clergy School in 1900. He served curacies at Bedale, Wymondham and Wem. He was Rector of Bourton-on-the-Hill from 1906 to 1946; during which time he was a Chaplain to the Forces from 1917 to 1919. He was appointed an Honorary Canon of Gloucester Cathedral in 1938.

Church of England titles
Preceded by Frederick William Sears	Archdeacon of Cheltenham; 1943–1951	Succeeded by Ronald Huntley Sutch
