= George Huntingford =

Anglican bishop

The Right Reverend George Huntingford
- Bishop of Hereford
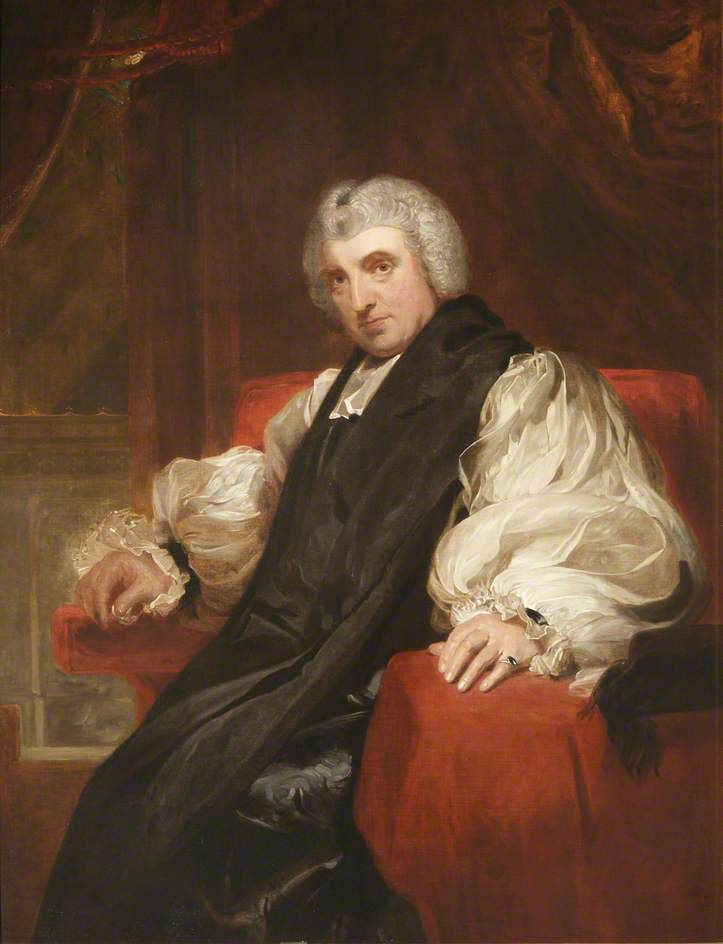
- Church: Church of England
- Diocese: Diocese of Hereford
- In office: 1815–1832
- Predecessor: John Luxmoore
- Successor: Edward Grey
- Other post: Bishop of Gloucester (1802–1815)

Personal details
- Born: 9 September 1748 Winchester
- Died: 29 April 1832 (aged 83) Winchester College
- Denomination: Anglican
- Education: Winchester College; New College, Oxford

George Isaac Huntingford (1748–1832) was successively of Bishop of Gloucester and Bishop of Hereford.

== Life ==
Huntingford was educated at Winchester College and New College, Oxford, where he became a Fellow in 1770, graduating M.A., 1776 and D.D. in 1793. He was then curate of Compton, south of Winchester, before becoming a master of his old school, of which he was warden from 1780 until his death. During this time there was considerable disorder in the school, including two rebellions.

In 1789 he was elected Warden of Winchester College.

Through his friendship with Henry Addington, whom he had taught at Winchester, Huntingford became Bishop of Gloucester, 1802–1815, and of Hereford, 1815–32, but continued to live in the comfortable Warden's lodgings at the school.

He compiled an account of his friend Henry Addington's administration, 1802; published also Short Introduction to Writing of Greek (frequently reissued), original Latin and Greek verse, and pamphlets.

From 1789 until 1825 he was vicar of the Church of St John the Evangelist, Milborne Port.

Church of England titles
Preceded by Richard Beadon	Bishop of Gloucester; 1802–1815	Succeeded by Henry Ryder
Preceded by John Luxmoore	Bishop of Hereford; 1815–1832	Succeeded by Edward Grey
