= Hedley Burrows =

British cleric and military chaplain

Hedley Robert Burrows (15 October 1887 – 27 October 1983) was an Anglican cleric in the 20th century, who rose to the position of Dean of Hereford. His father and son were bishops.

== Life ==
He was educated at Charterhouse and New College, Oxford and was ordained in 1912. His first post was a curacy at St Peter's, Petersfield after which he was a temporary World War I Chaplain. Hedley Burrows was one of the earliest clergymen to be appointed as a Temporary Chaplain to the Forces. He embarked for France on 19 August 1914. It was intended that he disembark at Le Havre, but the uncertainties of the early few weeks of the War saw a change of plan, and Burrows and six other chaplains landed further south at St Nazaire. Because of this unexpected venue, no-one knew quite what to do with seven chaplains, and they appear to have busied themselves as Medical auxiliaries for a time. In September 1914, Burrows went with 'the first motor ambulance' (6-cylinder Wolseley cars), taking wounded soldiers to Le Mans. On 25 November 1914, Burrows was sent to Boulogne. There he had an unfortunate accident which caused some mirth. On 16 December, Bishop Gwynne, a future Deputy Chaplain-General, noted that Burrows ‘... is only just recovering from a bad sprain in the leg from a fall into a grave while he was burying one of our soldiers in another. It must have been an awesome sight Chaplain, cassock - surplice book disappearing entirely into a six-foot drop.'

Burrows spent some time in hospital in Boulogne, was transferred to England, returned to France early in 1915 and was posted to No3 Casualty Clearing Station but was re-admitted to hospital with influenza on 8 February. He rejoined the British Expeditionary Force on 17 March. Two years later, Burrows resigned from the Chaplaincy. Notes on a Medical Board meeting on 14 December 1916, explain what happened to Burrows. 'In Oct 1915 had to read the burial service of his brother killed in action. Following these stresses he had hallucinations of vision and hearing, excitement, noisy, violent, clouding of consciousness' Hedley's brother, Leonard, had been one year younger, and they must have been raised together as close friends as well as relatives. Leonard had been a 2nd Lt in the Northumberland Fusiliers when he was killed on Hill 60 near Ypres on 2 October 1915 By 1916, Burrows had been granted an annual pension of £150p.a.

Burrows made a good recovery from his disability, for he was sufficiently able to return to full-time parochial work in 1917 in Argyll. A succession of posts followed as he made his way through the hierarchy most notably as Vicar of Grimsby and Rural Dean of Grimsby and Cleethorpes 1928–36. He was a preacher of renown with a particularly friendly manner which had matured during the active part of his chaplaincy in France. In 1947 he was appointed Dean of Hereford, and tried to place the Cathedral in harmony with a developing post-War world. He had ploughs, tractors and other agricultural machinery inside the cathedral for seasonal services. He retired in 1961.

Hedley Burrows was fiercely patriotic, and his Great War experiences never left him. He was proud of his medals, the Star, British and Victory. In World War Two, he lost a son on active service. He was recommended for the bishopric of Lincoln when it fell vacant in 1946, a tribute to the enormous impression he had made a decade earlier in Grimsby, but the Archbishop of York found him 'nervy and jumpy', his Great War Medical issues remaining with him.

Given the many traumas in his life, Burrows did well to survive to the age of 96, still in considerable correspondence with friends and family, and proud that his surviving son Simon became a bishop, of Buckingham in 1974.

Church of England titles
Preceded by Reginald Waterfield	Dean of Hereford; 1947–1961	Succeeded by Robert Price
