= Sarah Brown (priest) =

British Anglican priest

The Very Reverend Sarah Brown
- Dean of Hereford
- Church: Church of England
- Diocese: Hereford
- In office: October 2021 – present
- Predecessor: Michael Tavinor

Orders
- Ordination: 2009 (priest)

Personal details
- Born: Sarah Romilly Denner Brown; March 1965 (age 61)
- Denomination: Anglicanism
- Education: University of Nottingham; Eastern Region Ministry Course

Sarah Romilly Denner Brown (born March 1965) is a British Anglican priest, who has served as Dean of Hereford since 2021.

== Life and career ==
Brown was born in March 1965. She was educated at the University of Nottingham and trained as a priest through the Eastern Region Ministry Course. She served as curate in the benefice of Welford, Sibbertoft and Marston Trussell within the Diocese of Peterborough, and was ordained as a priest in 2009. In 2011, she was appointed Team Vicar in the Daventry Team Ministry, becoming Rural Dean of Daventry in 2013. In 2015, she became an Honorary Canon of Peterborough Cathedral, before being appointed Canon Missioner and Bishop's Advisor for Women's Ministry in 2018.

After being appointed Dean of Hereford on 7 July 2021, Brown was installed as Dean on 2 October.

Church of England titles
| Preceded by Michael Tavinor | Dean of Hereford; 2021– | Incumbent |
