= Reginald Lawson Waterfield =

British hematologist and astronomer

Reginald Lawson Waterfield (12 April 1900 – 10 June 1986 in Woolston) was a British hematologist known for his work in amateur astronomy, specialising in astrometry and the photography of comets. He was elected to the British Astronomical Association on 25 November 1914 and to the Royal Astronomical Society on 10 November 1916. Both elections being at the proposal of W H Steavenson. Waterfield served as Director of the British Astronomical Association Mars Section from 1931 to 1942 and its president from 1954 to 1956. For his work in astronomy he won the 1942 Jackson-Gwilt Medal. After World War II he had to use a wheelchair due to polio. The minor planet 1645 Waterfield is named jointly for him and his cousin William Francis Herschel Waterfield (1886-1933), who was also a member of the British Astronomical Association and Fellow of the Royal Astronomical Society.

He was the son of Reginald Waterfield, a prominent teacher and clergyman.

== Books ==
Waterfield wrote two books on astronomy:-

• A Hundred Years of Astronomy, Duckworth, 1938.

• The Revolving Heavens, 1942.

== Obituaries ==
QJRAS vol 28 (1987), p. 544

JBAA vol 97 (1987), p. 211

BMJ vol 293 (1986), p. 214
