= Eric Evans (priest, born 1928) =

British priest (1928–1996)

Thomas Eric Evans KCVO (1 February 1928 – 17 August 1996) was Dean of St Paul's from 1988 until his death eight years later.

== Biography ==
Evans was educated at St David's College, Lampeter, and then at St Catharine's College, Cambridge. He was ordained in 1954 and began his ordained ministry with curacies in Margate and Bournemouth. After this, he was youth chaplain for the Diocese of Gloucester and then Canon Missioner at Gloucester Cathedral and Archdeacon of Cheltenham.

Evans served on the Board of the Council for the Care of Churches and was a Member of the Church of England Synod. He was a Church Commissioner.

Church of England titles
| Preceded by George Hutchins | Archdeacon of Cheltenham; 1975–1988 | Succeeded by John Lewis |
| Preceded by Alan Webster | Dean of St Paul's; 1988–1996 | Succeeded by John Moses |
