= George Hutchins (priest) =

George Francis Hutchins (8 October 1909 – 3 February 1977) was Archdeacon of Cheltenham from 1965 to 1976.

Hutchins was educated at Plymouth College and the University of Bristol and ordained in 1934. After a curacy at St Matthew Moorfields, Bristol he held three incumbencies in Barbados. Returning to England in 1948 he was Vicar at All Saints, Gloucester until 1955 when he became Rector of Dursley. In 1961 he was appointed Canon Missioner for the Diocese of Gloucester, a post he held until his Archdeacon's appointment.

Church of England titles
Preceded by Ronald Huntley Sutch	Archdeacon of Cheltenham; 1965–1976	Succeeded by Eric Evans
