= Samuel Bowly =

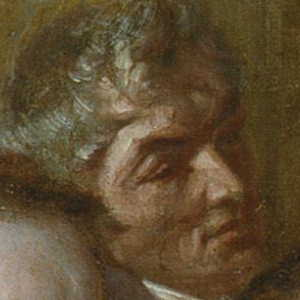
- Bowly at the 1840 Anti-Slavery conference
- Born: 1802; Cirencester
- Died: 1870; Gloucester
- Known for: Slavery abolitionist, Temperance
- Spouse(s): Miss Shipley & Mrs Cottrell

Samuel Bowly (1802–1884) was an English abolitionist and temperance advocate.

== Biography ==
Bowly, son of Sarah (born Crotch) and Samuel Bowly, miller at Bibury, Gloucestershire, was born in Cirencester on 23 March 1802. He had a sound business training under his father. In 1829 he moved from Bibury to Gloucester, and commenced business dealing in cheeses. He was on the board of the Birmingham and Gloucester Railway.

He became chairman of local banking, gas, railway, and other companies, and for the last twenty years of his life he was a leader in commercial circles and affairs. In the agitation against the Corn Laws he took a prominent part, and supported Cobden and Bright. He wanted to give the people cheap and universal education. He was a founders of the British and ragged schools in Gloucester and an advocate of a national system. Bowly belonged to the Society of Friends; he was also a supporter of disestablishment.

Bowly took an active part in the anti-slavery agitation, and by his powerful appeals completely beat Peter Borthwick, the pro-slavery lecturer, off the ground. He was one of the deputation, 14 November 1837, which went to Downing Street to have an interview with Lord Melbourne about the cruelties exercised towards the slaves under the seven years' apprenticeship system, and in the following year took an active part in the formation of the Central Negro Emancipation Committee, which was ultimately instrumental in causing the abolition of the objectionable regulations. He is pictured above at the 1840 International Anti-Slavery conference in London.

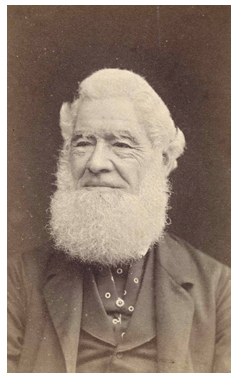
Samuel Bowly

Bowly is to the left in this painting, which is of the 1840 World Anti-Slavery Convention. Move your cursor to identify him or click icon to enlarge

On 17 April 1840, the British and Foreign Anti-Slavery Society was formed to campaign for worldwide abolition of slavery. A short time later, the first World Anti-Slavery Convention was held in London, attracting an international participation. Bowly attended the convention and is depicted in a painting The Anti-Slavery Society Convention, 1840 by Benjamin Haydon(1841). However it was his advocacy of temperance that made him best known. It was on 30 December 1835 that he signed the pledge of total abstinence, and formed a teetotal society in his own city. One of his earliest missions was to the members of his own religious society, undertaken in company with Edward Smith of Sheffield, throughout Great Britain and Ireland. During his later years he held frequent drawing-room meetings. As president of the National Temperance League, as president of the Temperance Hospital from its foundation, and as a director of the United Kingdom Temperance and General Provident Institution, he was able to draw the attention of scientific men to the injurious effects of alcohol on the human system. On behalf of the National Temperance League he attended and addressed 107 meetings during the last year of his life, travelling many hundreds of miles.

The eightieth anniversary of his birth was celebrated in Gloucester in 1882, and he died in that city on Sunday, 23 March 1884, the eighty-second anniversary of his birthday. He was buried in the cemetery on 27 March, when an immense concourse of people, both rich and poor, attended the funeral.

He married, first, Miss Jane Shipley, daughter of Mr. John Shipley of Shaftesbury. His second wife, Louisa Cotterell, was the widow of Jacob Henry Cottrell of Bath, especially known for his connection with the Rechabite Friendly Society. His third child, (of nine) by his first marriage, Martha (1836-1901) married Frederick Goodall Cash (1829-1909), the sixth child of William Cash (1792-1849)of the well-known Coventry weaving family and makers of Cash's name tapes and Elizabeth Petipher Cash née Lucas (1796-1894). Fred and Martha Cash had seven children, of which the youngest Mabel (1868-1956) married the eminent Quaker John Henry Barlow. They had four children (Deborah Phyllis died aged 2 1909) including F Ralph Barlow (1910-1980), a leading member of the Friends' Ambulance Unit in WW2 and who succeeded his father as Director of the Bournville Village Trust. Ralph married Joan Barber (1914-2007) and they had 4 children of whom David Barlow (b.1937), became Secretary of the BBC and Controller of Regional Broadcasting, Antony Barlow (b.1941), an arts administrator and publicist, Stephen Barlow (b.1945) a Birmingham Hotelier and later a freelance distributor, Rosemary Barlow (b.1947), a primary school teacher and Nicholas Barlow (b.1958) an Estate Manager for Lord Aylesbury amongst others.

== Works ==
Bowly published:

- A Speech delivered 1 Oct. 1830 at a meeting to petition Parliament for the Abolition of Negro Slavery 1830
- Speech upon the present condition of the Negro Apprentices 1838
- A Letter to J. Sturge on the Temperance Society and Church Rates, by L. Rugg, with a reply by S. Bowly 1841
- An Address to Christian Professors 1850
- Total Abstinence and its proper Place 1863
