= Gamaliel Clifton =

Gamaliel Clifton or Clyfton (died 1541) was a Canon of Windsor from 1522 to 1541 and Dean of Hereford from 1530 to 1541.

He was appointed:

- Prebendary of York Minster, 1500–1541
- Prebendary of Hereford Cathedral, 1528
- Dean of Hereford, 1530

He was appointed to the twelfth stall in St George's Chapel, Windsor Castle in 1522, and held the stall until 1541.

Clifton received a papal dispensation for homicide in 1513.
