= Christopher Pepys =

British bishop (1914–1974)

George Christopher Cutts Pepys (29 June 1914 – 4 April 1974) was, from 1964 to 1974, the fifth Bishop of Buckingham in the Church of England.

Pepys was educated at Winchester College and Oriel College, Oxford and studied for ordination at Ripon College Cuddesdon before a curacy at St John the Divine's Kennington. After wartime service in the Royal Naval Volunteer Reserve (RNVR) he was successively Rector of Hartfield, Sussex, Vicar of St Mark's Portsea and, before his ordination to the episcopate, Rural Dean of Liverpool. He died in post in 1974. His wife, Elizabeth (d. 2009), later married another Church of England Bishop, Michael Mann.

Church of England titles
Preceded by Gordon David Savage	Bishop of Buckingham; 1964–1974	Succeeded by Simon Hedley Burrows
