= Alan Cornwall (priest) =

British Archdeacon (1858–1932)

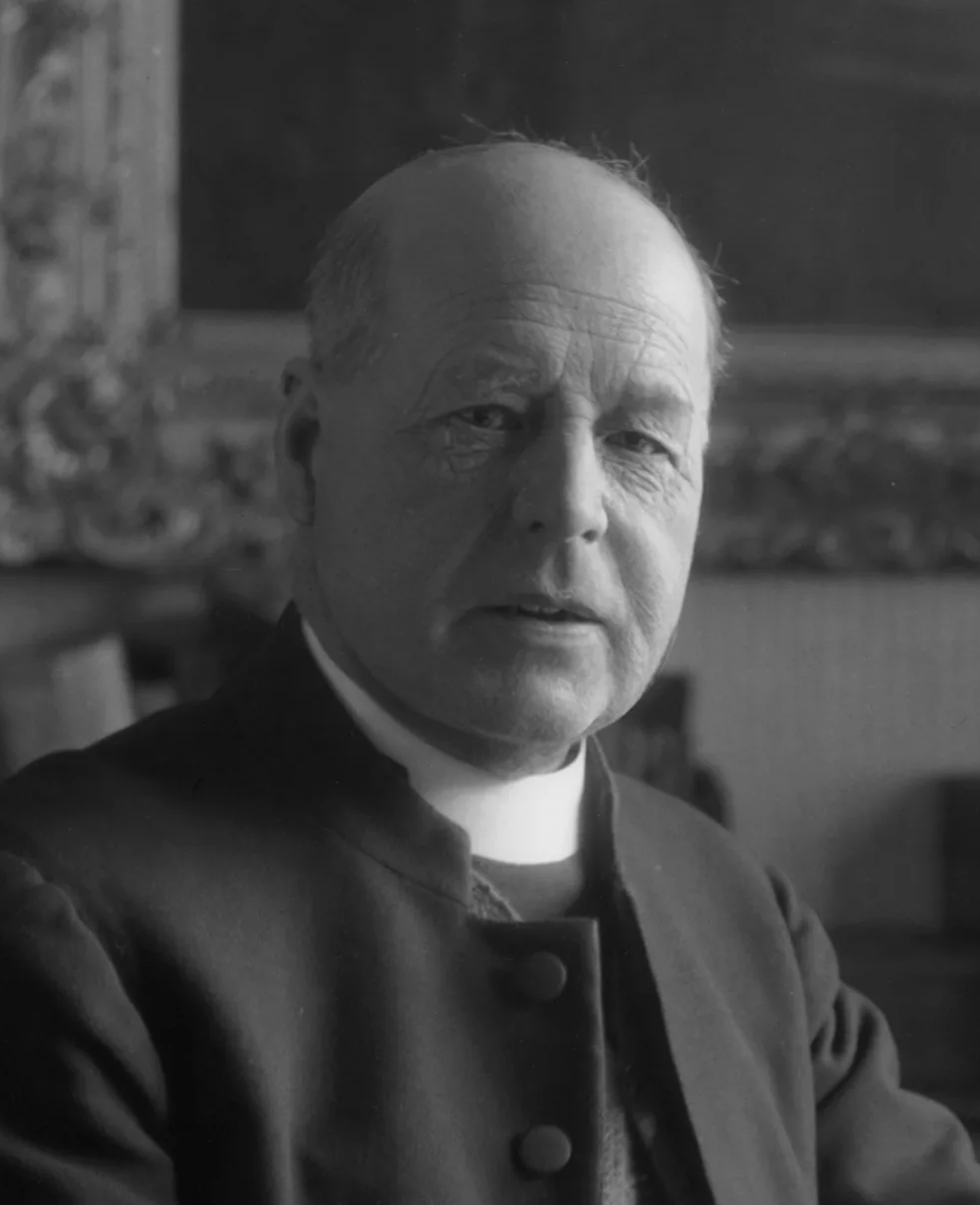
Cornwall in 1929

Alan Whitmore Cornwall (4 October 1858 – 9 June 1932) was Archdeacon of Cheltenham from 1924 until his death.

Born at Uley on 4 October 1858 into an ecclesiastical family he was educated at Eton and University College, Oxford and ordained after a period of study at Wells Theological College in 1884. After curacies in Cirencester and Gloucester he was the Vicar of Coleford from 1891 until 1899; and then of Thornbury until his Archdeacon's appointment.

He died on 9 June 1932. His son, Nigel, was Bishop of Borneo from 1949 until 1962.

Church of England titles
Preceded by George Lawrence Harter Gardner	Archdeacon of Cheltenham; 1924–1932	Succeeded by Frederick William Sears
