= St Saviour's Church, Dartmouth =

St Saviour’s Church, Dartmouth
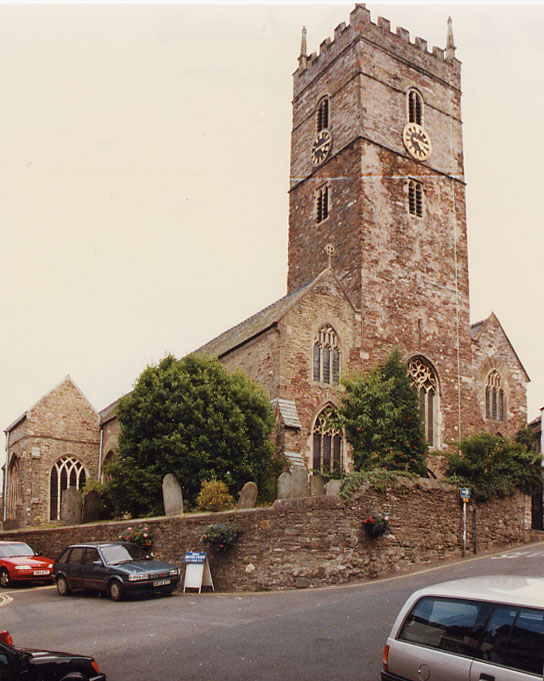
- St Saviour’s Church, Dartmouth
- 50°21′10″N 3°35′27″W
- OS grid reference: SX 87764 51329
- Country: England
- Denomination: Church of England
- Website: dartmouthanddittisham-anglican.org

History
- Status: Active
- Dedication: St Saviour

Architecture
- Heritage designation: Grade I listed

Administration
- Diocese: Diocese of Exeter
- Archdeaconry: Archdeaconry of Totnes
- Deanery: Totnes
- Benefice: Dartmouth (St Petrox) (St Saviour) & Dittisham
- Parish: Dartmouth St. Clement (Townstal) with St. Saviour and St. Petrox

St Saviour’s Church, Dartmouth is a Grade I listed Church of England parish church in Dartmouth, Devon.

== History ==
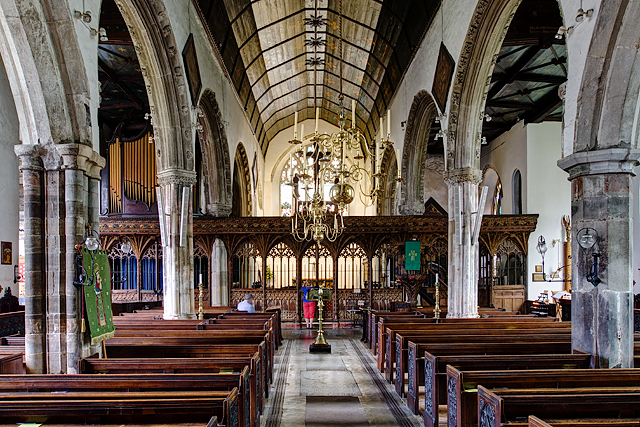
The interior of the church

The church was dedicated in 1372 as a chapel of ease under St Clement’s Church, Townstal. Much of the funding to build the church came from John Hawley, three times Mayor of Dartmouth who died in 1408 and is buried in the church.

The eastern end of the nave was rebuilt in the late 15th century and this included the installation of a rood screen in 1496 which survives to this day. The south porch dates from 1620 and houses a door with 14th century ironwork featuring two leopards and large leaf scrolls.

The town corporation owned the advowson from 1585 to 1835 and were responsible for a major restoration and refurbishment which took place from 1633 to 1637. During later restorations inscriptions were found in the south transept This syde to the church was new built Anno Domino 1634, Alexander Staplehill being Maior and on the north This syde to the church was new built Anno Domino 1634, William Gourney being Maior.

In 1842 the church was improved by painting and whitewashing. The chancel and screen were re-gilded and ornamented.

A major restoration of the church took place between 1887 and 1888 at a cost of £3,400 (equivalent to £382,100 in 2025) by Mr. Ashworth of Exeter and John Dando Sedding. The roofs of the nave and transepts were replaced entirely and an additional vestry was provided for the choir. New choir stalls were provided in the style of the screen.

A second phase of restoration was supervised by Ashworth between 1893 and 1895 when a new north porch was added. The third phase of restoration concluded in 1906. This had moved the large painting to above the staircase to the west gallery, opening up the chancel arch.

== Incumbents ==
The list of Successive Vicars of the Parish of Townstal with St. Saviour Dartmouth (St Saviour’s from 1372) is recorded on a board on the wall of the church thus:

- 1316 Richard de Wydecomb
- 1329 Henry Priour
- 1338 Thomas de Coleton
- 1348 Richard Coke
- 1362 John de Lyvedistone
- 1375 William de Rayschlegh
- 1382 Robert John
- 1391 Nicholas de Cherlton
- 1394 Matthew Yurd
- 1396 Nicholas de Cherlton
- 1400 Richard de Bradeworthy
- 1406 William Mychell
- 1414 John Burgh
- 1433 John Lacy
- 1441 Thomas Cambar
- 1447 Richard Cade
- 1476 John Chester
- 1499 Roger Lugg
- 1513 Thomas Humfray
- 1530 Nicholas Cartwright
- 1551 Simom Reed
- 1564 John Roupe
- 1575 William Gunter
- 1582 Anthony Hartley
- 1586 Walter Roche
- 1606 Walter Wilseman
- 1636 Anthony Harford
- 1653 John Flavel (non-conformist Lecturer)
- 1662 Nicholas Battersby
- 1685 Humphrey Smith
- 1709 William Prichard
- 1723 Richard Kent
- 1726 Henry Holdsworth
- 1763 John Nosworthy
- 1779 George Gretton (later Dean of Hereford)
- 1804 Caleb Rockett
- 1809 William F. Baylay (later vicar of Holy Trinity Church, Margate)
- 1811 Robert Holdsworth
- 1837 John Tracey
- 1871 John Priestly Foster
- 1880 Edward C. Britton
- 1884 Joseph S. Exell
- 1890 Harry Frank Tracey
- 1914 Francis R.B. Simpson
- 1935 Alfred Shell
- 1941 Arthur J. Watts
- 1945 T.G. David Watkins
- 1957 Roger Talbot Urwin
- 1967 Harvey Royden Phillips (afterwards vicar of St Peter's Church, Shaldon)
- 1979 John Butler
- 1996 Roger E. Flower
- 2000 Simon C. Wright
- 2011 W.P.G. Hazelwood
- 2021 Andrew P. Langley

== Organ ==
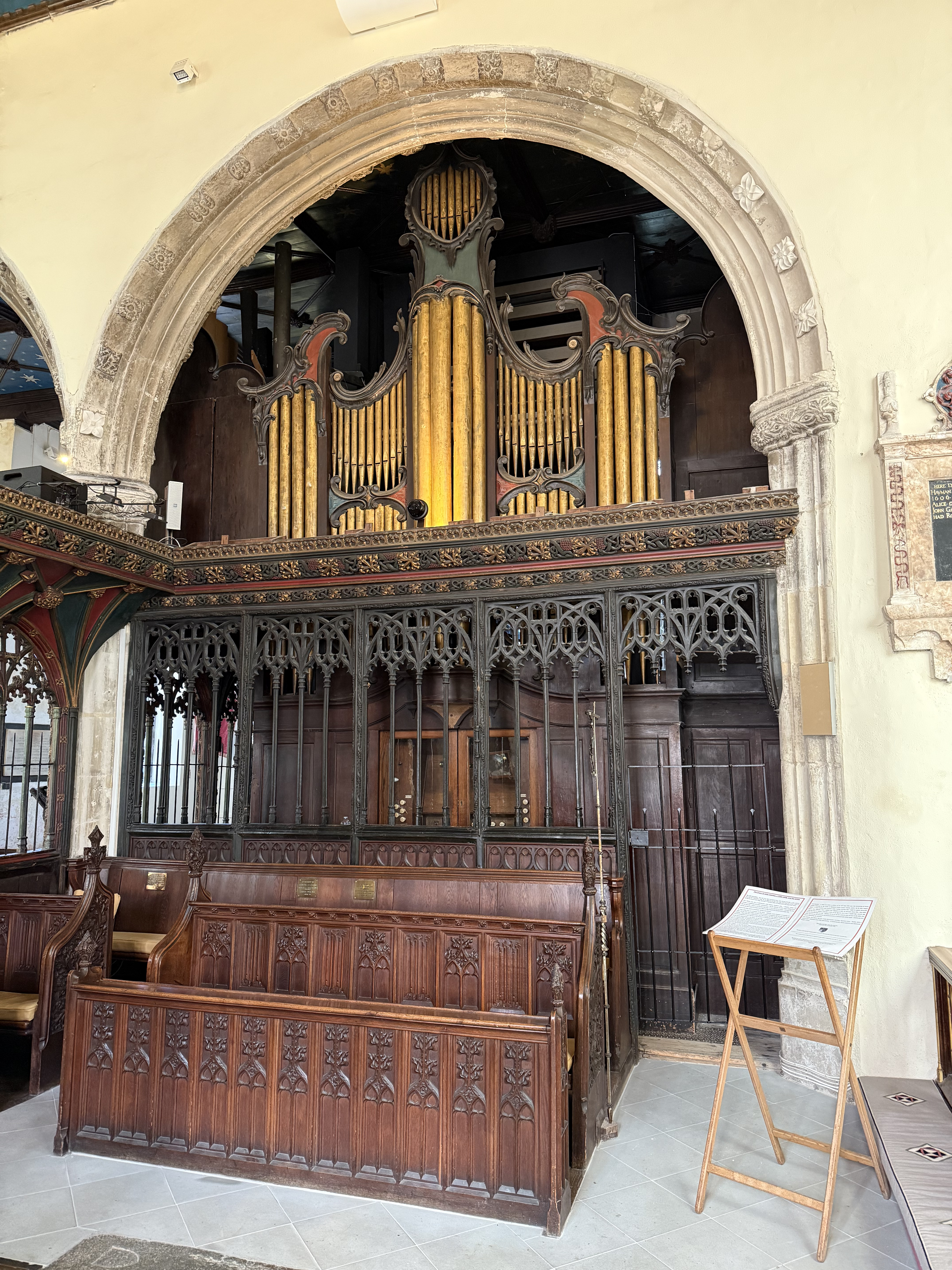
The organ in St Saviour's Church, Dartmouth

Church records from 1434 note the existence of an organ. In 1531-32 there is mention of a new organ. The fate of this organ is unknown.

The organ from 1789 by Paul Micheau which had pedals added around 1840 was renovated and enlarged in 1889 by Bryceson Brothers of London at a cost of over £600 which resulted in a three manual instrument of 29 speaking stops and 1,708 pipes.

This instrument was later restored and enlarged again by Michael Farley in 1996. A specification of the organ can be found on the National Pipe Organ Register.

=== Organists ===
- Mr. Churchill 1789
- Stephen Jarvis 1849–1874 (afterwards organist of St Mary’s Church, Lewisham)
- C.T. Davis
- W.J. Granger 1890–1891 (afterwards organist at St Mark’s Church, Portsea)
- T. Wigley 1891
- W.H. Bates 1892–1894
- William John Friendship 1894–1938
- J. Beasley 1938–1944
- Brian Edgington

== Bells ==
In 1895 the bells were recorded in the Dartmouth & South Hams chronicle as follows:

- 1. E. Brooking, Esq, mayor, A.H. Holdsworth, Esq, justive, Robert Holdsworth, A.M., vicar. Anno Domini 1826. W.P. 30 inches diameter
- 2. Wm. Parnell, of Collumpton, fecit, 1826. 31½ inches diameter (this and the treble hung above)
- 3. Prosperity to the Corporation. W. Parnell, founder, Collumpton, fecit. 1826. 30 inches diameter
- 4. Keep peace and good neighbourhood. A. Goodling, 1732. 33½ inches diameter
- 5. Wm. Parnell, of Collumpton, fecit, 1826. 35 inches diameter
- 6. Thomas Leigh, mayor. A. Gooding, founder, 1742. 32½ inches diameter
- 7. Ambrose Goodling, of Plymouth, cast us all 1732. 41½ inches diameter (A running foliage and vines).
- 8. I to the church the living call and to the grave do summon all. Originally given by Walter Jago, Esq. J. Warner & Sons, The Crescent Foundry, 1854. Re-cast. A.D. 1854. John Tracey, A.M. vicar. Note of this tenor bell. E sharp. 47 inches diameter.

The ring of eight bells was recast in 1938 by John Taylor & Co of Loughborough in the key of E flat with a tenor weight of 946 kilograms (2,086 lb).

== Clock ==
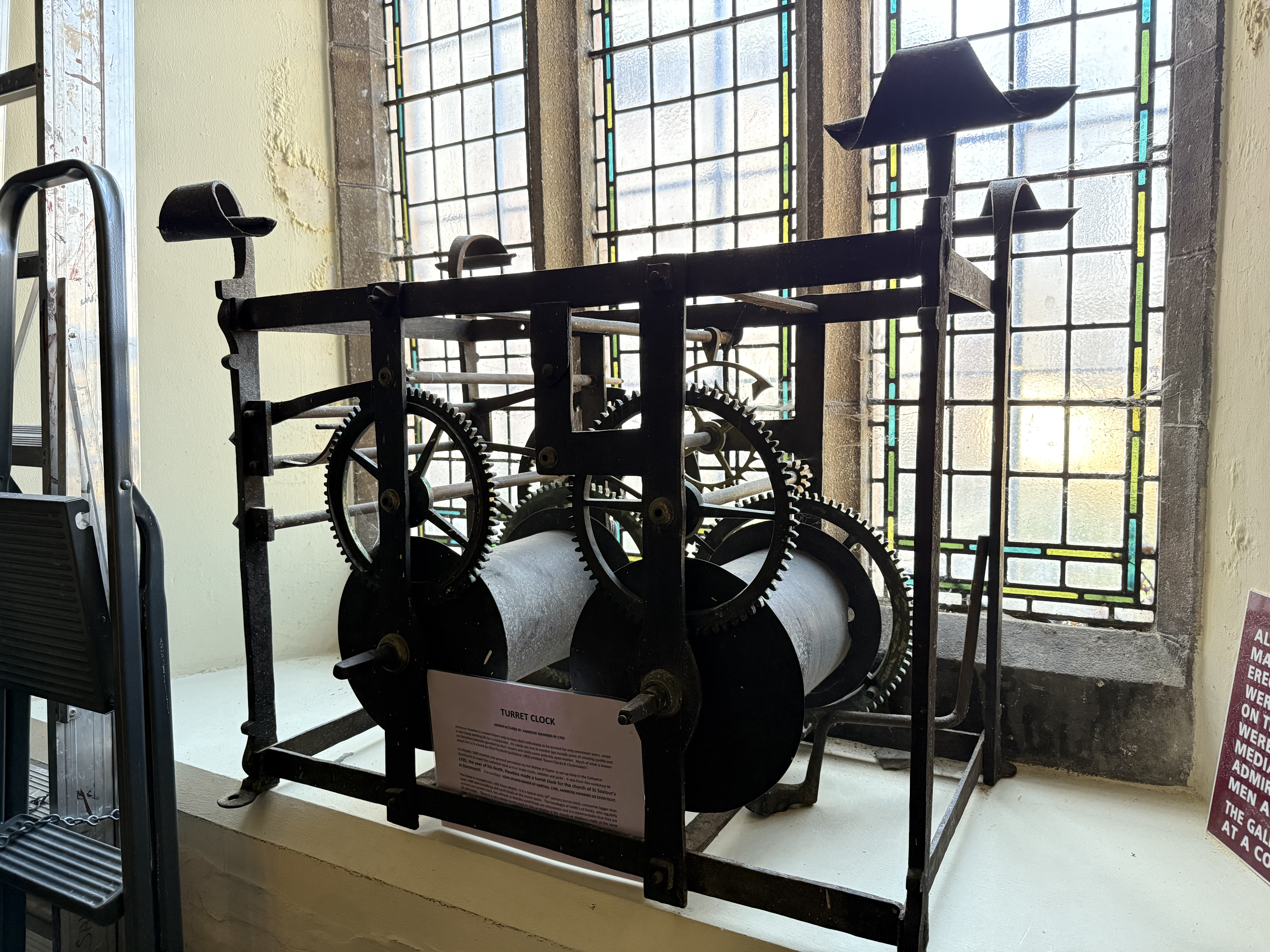
Turret Clock by Ambrose Hawkins 1705

In 1705, Ambrose Hawkins of Exeter made a turret clock for the church. The frame was wrought-iron, with brass wheels and mouldings and scroll finials on the corner-posts. This was replaced in 1906 when John Smith and Sons of Derby made a new clock with a gravity escapement. The mechanism of 1705 survives and is on display at the back of the church.
