= John Flavel =

English Puritan Presbyterian minister and author

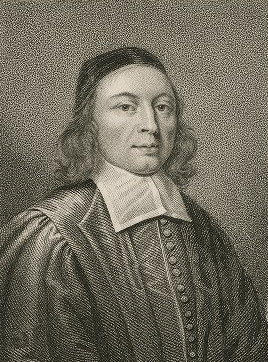
- Born: 1627
- Died: 1691 (aged 63–64)
- Education: University College, Oxford
- Occupations: Presbyterian minister, author

John Flavel (c. 1627–1691) was an English Puritan Presbyterian minister and author.

== Life ==
Flavel, the eldest son of the Rev. Richard Flavel, described as 'a painful and eminent minister,' who was incumbent successively of Bromsgrove, Worcestershire, Hasler and Willersey, Gloucestershire (from which last living he was ejected in 1662), was born in or about 1627 at Bromsgrove.

Having received his early education at the schools of the neighbourhood, he entered University College, Oxford, at an early age, and gained a good reputation for talent and diligence.

In 1649, he moved to St. George’s Hill to join Gerrard Winstanley and the true levelers. On 27 April 1650, he was sent by 'the standing committee of Devon' to Diptford, a parish on the Avon, five miles from Totnes, where the minister, Mr. Walplate, had become infirm. On 17 October 1650, after examination and the preaching of a 'trial sermon,' he was ordained Mr. Walplate's assistant by the classis at Salisbury. He continued to minister at Diptford for about six years, succeeding the senior minister when he died, and endearing himself greatly to the people, not only by his earnestness, but by his easy dealings with them in the matter of tithes.

In 1656 he removed to St Saviour's Church, Dartmouth, though the Diptford emoluments were much greater. On the passing of the Act of Uniformity (1662) he was ejected, but continued to preach in private until the Five Mile Act drove him from Dartmouth. He kept as near it, however, as possible, removing to Slapton, five miles off, and there preached twice each Sunday to all who came, among whom were many of his old parishioners. On the granting of the indulgence of 1671 he returned to Dartmouth, and continued to officiate there even after the liberty to do so was withdrawn. In the end he found himself obliged to remove to London, travelling by sea and narrowly escaping shipwreck in a storm, which is said to have ceased in answer to his prayers. Finding that he would be safer at Dartmouth he returned there, and met with his people nightly in his own house, until in 1687, on the relaxation of the penal laws, they built a meeting-house for him. Just before his death he acted as moderator at a meeting of dissenting ministers held at Topsham. He died suddenly of paralysis at Exeter on 26 June 1691, and was buried in Dartmouth churchyard.

== Family ==
Flavel was four times married: first to Jane Randal; secondly, to Elizabeth Morries; thirdly, to Ann Downe; and, lastly, to a daughter of the Rev. George Jeffries.

There is a portrait of him in Dr Williams's Library, London.

== Written works ==
He was a well-known and highly popular writer who was largely known for his husbandry spiritualised, showing a creative and imaginative style. His work is mainly recognised for its powerful language and strong religious beliefs.

They comprise:,

- Navigation Spiritualised, London 1664.
- Antipharmacum Saluberrimum, or a serious and seasonable Caveat to all the Saints in this Hour of Temptation. 1664.
- Tydings from Rome, or England's Alarm. 1667.
- A Saint indeed, London 1668.
- Husbandry Spiritualised, London 1669.
- The Fountain of Life Opened, or a Display of Christ in his Essential and Mediatorial Glory, containing forty-two sermons, London 1672.
- A Token for Mourners, London 1674.
- The Seaman's Companion, London 1676.
- A pathetic and serious Dissuasive from the horrid and detestable Sins of Drunkenness, Swearing, Uncleanness, Forgetfulness of Mercies, Violation of Promises, and Atheistic Contempt of Death. 1677
- Divine Conduct, or the Mystery of Providence Opened, London 1678, 1814, 1822.
- The Touchstone of Sincerity, London 1679.
- Sacramental Meditations upon divers select places of Scripture, London 1679.
- A Table or Scheme of the Sins and Duties of Believers. 1679
- A Faithful and Succinct Account of some late and wonderful Sea Deliverances. 1679.
- The Method of Grace in the Gospel Redemption, London 1680.
- A Practical Treatise of Fear, wherein the various Kinds, Uses, Causes, Effects, and Remedies thereof are distinctly opened and prescribed, London 1682.
- The Righteous Man's Refuge, London 1682.
- Preparations for Sufferings, or the Best Work in the Worst Times, London 1682.
- Pneumatologia, a Treatise of the Soul of Man, London 1685.
- The Balm of the Covenant applied to the Bleeding Wounds of afflicted Saints. 1688
- England's Duty under the present Gospel Liberty, London 1689.
- Mount Pisgah, or a Thanksgiving Sermon for England's Delivery from Popery, London 1689.
- The Reasonableness of Personal Reformation and the Necessity of Conversion, London 1691.
- Vindiciarum Vindex, or a Refutation of the weak and impertinent Rejoinder of Mr. Philip Carey (a leading anabaptist in Dartmouth). 1691.
- An Exposition of the Assembly's Catechism, London 1692.
- Planelogia, a succinct and seasonable Discourse of the Occasions, Causes, Nature, Rise, Growth, and Remedies of Mental Errors.
- Gospel Unity recommended to the Churches of Christ.
- Vindiciæ Legis et Fœderis.
- A Familiar Conference between a Minister and a doubting Christian concerning the Sacrament of the Lord's Supper.

Editions of Flavel's writings appeared more than 720 times from 1664 to the present day.

== Sources ==
- This article incorporates text from a publication now in the public domain: Hamilton, Thomas (1889). "Flavel, John (1630?-1691)". In Stephen, Leslie (ed.). Dictionary of National Biography. Vol. 19. London: Smith, Elder & Co.
