= Edward Merewether (physician) =

British barrister and physician

Dr Edward Rowland Alworth Merewether FRSE CB CBE (1892–1970) was a British barrister and physician (combining two fields in a unique manner). He was an expert in industrial medicine and the laws linked to this, working especially with asbestosis. In 1944 he was appointed Honorary Physician to King George VI. Close colleagues called him "Uncle M". In authorship he is known as E. R. A. Merewether.

== Life ==
He was born in Durham on 2 March 1892 the son of Alworth Edward Merewether, a naval surgeon.

He studied medicine at Durham University graduating MB BS in 1914. In the First World War, he served in the Royal Navy, having been appointed a temporary surgeon on 24 October 1914. He was mentioned in despatches for his service with the British Naval Mission in Serbia in January 1916, and was also awarded the Order of St Sava by the Kingdom of Serbia. After the war he started specialising in chest diseases.

In 1927, he joined the staff of the Factory Department of the Home Office as a medical inspector. Here he was one of the first to identify the dangers of breathing asbestos fibre and also identified silicosis in sandblast operators. In 1928 he joined Dr H. E. Seiler, Medical Officer of Health in Glasgow looking at cases of pulmonary fibrosis in asbestos workers. Merewether conclusively proved a link between asbestos and the disease.

In 1940 he was elected a Fellow of the Royal Society of Edinburgh. His proposers were Sir Thomas Oliver, Stuart McDonald, Edwin Bramwell and David Murray Lyon. In 1943 he succeeded Dr J. C. Bridge as His Majesty's Senior Inspector of Factories in Great Britain. In June 1944, he was appointed an Honorary Physician to the King (KHP); he completed his term of office in June 1947. In the 1948 King's Birthday Honours, he was appointed Commander of the Order of the British Empire (CBE).

He retired in 1957 and died on 13 February 1970.

== Family ==
His great-grandfather was John Merewether.

In 1918 he married Ruth Annie Hayton Waddell. They had three daughters.

== Publications ==
- Report on the Effects of Asbestos Dust on Lungs (1930)
- Industrial Medicine and Hygiene
