= Reginald Waterfield =

British Anglican priest (1867–1967)

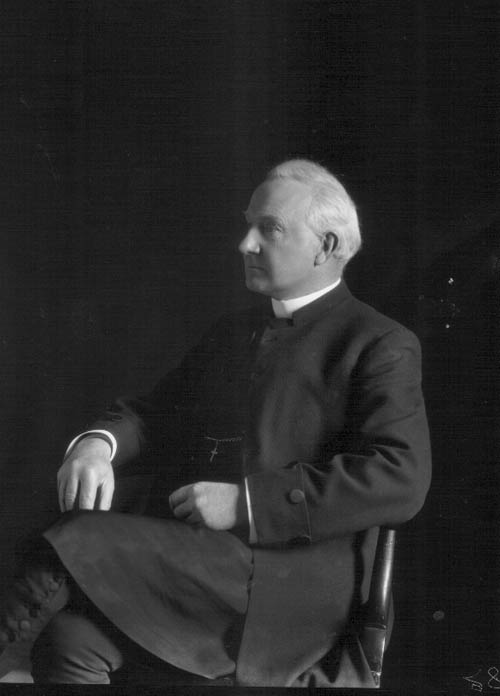
Waterfield, photographed in connection with the Synod of the Clergy of the Diocese of Hereford, 18 May 1927.

Reginald Waterfield (20 December 1867 – 8 March 1967) was an Anglican priest in the 20th century.

== Education and career ==
He was educated at Winchester and New College, Oxford, and was ordained in 1897. He was assistant master at Rugby School, then Principal of Cheltenham College, then Archdeacon of Cirencester (renamed Archdeacon of Cheltenham in 1919). In 1919 he became Dean of Hereford, a post he held until his retirement in 1947. He died in March 1967 aged 99 years and, following cremation, his ashes were buried in the Lady Arbour at Hereford Cathedral.

== Freemasonry ==
Waterfield was a prominent Freemason, and served as Provincial Grand Master of Herefordshire from 1923 to 1946. The Dean Waterfield Lodge No 8089 in Hereford is named after him. He and his Bishop, Hensley Henson, were both founders of the Cantilupe Lodge No 4083, named after Thomas de Cantilupe of Hereford.

== Family ==
Reginald Lawson Waterfield (1900-1986), haematologist and astronomer, was his son.

Church of England titles
Preceded by John Sinclair	Archdeacon of Cirencester; 1919–1919	Succeeded by Himself as Archdeacon of Cheltenham
Preceded by Himself as Archdeacon of Cirencester	Archdeacon of Cheltenham; 1919–1919	Succeeded by George Gardner
Preceded by Wentworth Leigh	Dean of Hereford; 1919–1946	Succeeded by Hedley Burrows
