= Wentworth Leigh =

Anglican priest

James Wentworth Leigh (22 January 1838 – 5 January 1923) was an Anglican priest in the last decade of the 19th century and the first two of the 20th. He was a very active Freemason, an enthusiastic temperance campaigner, and an ardent social reformer.

== Early life ==
Born at Paris and brought up at Stoneleigh Abbey, Warwickshire in a noble family (his father was Chandos Leigh, 1st Baron Leigh from 1839), he was educated at Harrow and Trinity College, Cambridge.

At the age of sixteen, he attempted to enlist in the British Army to serve in the Crimean War and after leaving university went on a tour with three friends of Egypt, Palestine and Constantinople before studying for ministry in the Church of England at Wells Theological College.

== Career ==
He was ordained in 1862 and became Curate of St John the Baptist, Bromsgrove. Two years later he was appointed Vicar of Stoneleigh, Warwickshire. Later, he held incumbencies at All Saints Leamington and St Mary's, Bryanston Square.

In 1894 he was appointed to the Deanery of Hereford Cathedral and retired in 1919. In 1920, he served as President of the National Temperance League (Great Britain).

=== Freemasonry ===
He was an active and zealous Freemason, who rose to a senior rank within the organisation. Having risen through the ranks of his lodge, and his Provincial Grand Lodge, and attained appointment as an officer of the United Grand Lodge of England, in 1899 he was granted the honorary rank of Past Grand Chaplain, the most senior clerical appointment in Freemasonry. In 1906 he received a patent to act as Provincial Grand Master of Herefordshire, taking sole charge of all lodges in that county.

== Personal life ==
He died in January 1923 aged 84.

== Notes ==
Church of England titles
Preceded by George Herbert	Dean of Hereford; 1894–1919	Succeeded by Reginald Waterfield
