= Frederick W. Sears =

American neurologist

Frederick W. Sears (June 30, 1859 – January 2, 1934) was a neurologist.

He was born in Morristown, New Jersey, and attended Yale and Amherst Colleges, graduating in 1881. He earned his M.D. in 1888 from the University of Vermont, and did postgraduate work at Harvard and Johns Hopkins as well as in New York and Europe. He ran a farm near South Hero, Vermont from 1886 to 1890. He became Professor of Nervous Diseases at the University of Vermont Medical College in 1912. He was president of the Burlington Health Commission from 1914 to 1917.

He married Elizabeth Hollis in 1881. He became ill in 1928 and never returned to full health. In October 1933 he broke his hip and never recovered.
