= John Lewis (archdeacon of Cheltenham) =

English Anglican clergyman (1934–2024)

John Arthur Lewis (4 October 1934 – 15 July 2024) was an English Anglican clergyman who was Archdeacon of Cheltenham from 1988 to 1998.

== Biography ==
Born on 4 October 1934, Lewis was educated at Jesus College, Oxford and ordained after a period of study at Ripon College Cuddesdon in 1960. After curacies in Prestbury and Wimborne Minster he held incumbencies in Nailsworth and Cirencester until his Archdeacon's appointment.

Lewis died on 15 July 2024, at the age of 89.

Church of England titles
Preceded by Eric Evans	Archdeacon of Cheltenham; 1988–1998	Succeeded by Hedley Ringrose
