= John Sinclair (archdeacon of Cirencester) =

British clergyman

John Stewart Sinclair (15 May 1853 – 30 April 1919) was a British clergyman who became Archdeacon of Cirencester.

Sinclair was the son of Prebendary William Sinclair, sometime Rector of Pulborough, Sussex; and the grandson of the Scottish politician and author Sir John Sinclair Bt MP. He was educated at Repton School and Oriel College, Oxford, and ordained in 1876. After curacies in Pulborough and Fulham, he was vicar of St Dionis, Parsons Green, and then in Cirencester until his appointment as Archdeacon.

Church of England titles
Preceded by Henry Rudge Hayward	Archdeacon of Cirencester; 1908–1919	Succeeded by Reginald Waterfield
