= Frederick Sears (priest) =

English priest

Frederick Williams Sears (1871 – 9 November 1955) was Archdeacon of Cheltenham from 1932 until 1943.

Sears was born in Taunton in 1871 and educated at St John's College, Cambridge. He was ordained after a period of study at Wells Theological College in 1899 and began his ecclesiastical career with curacies in Ryhope and Gloucester. He was the Vicar of Nailsworth from 1908 until 1915; Rector of Minchinhampton from 1915 to 1918, and then Leckhampton from 1928 to 1938.

A Canon Residentiary of Gloucester Cathedral from 1938 to 1943, he died at Milford on Sea on 9 November 1955.

Church of England titles
Preceded by Alan Whitmore Cornwall	Archdeacon of Cheltenham; 1932–1943	Succeeded by Edmund Theodore Murray
