= Ronald Sutch =

Ronald Huntley Sutch (5 March 1890 – 22 February 1975) was Archdeacon of Cheltenham from 1951 to 1965.

Sutch was educated at Batley Grammar School and Merton College, Oxford and ordained as a priest in 1915. After a curacy at Christ Church, Glasgow he was Rector of St Mungo, Alexandria until 1917 when he became a Chaplain to the British Armed Forces. After World War I, he resigned his commission and became Vicar of Ravensthorpe. Following further incumbencies in Slimbridge and Cheltenham he became Rural Dean of Cirencester in 1941, a post he held until his appointment as Archdeacon in 1951.

Sutch married Elizabeth Lang Jones in 1916; they had two sons. He died on 22 February 1975. His grandson, David Sutch was installed as the Archdeacon of Gibraltar in July 2008.

Church of England titles
Preceded by Edmund Theodore Murray	Archdeacon of Cheltenham; 1951–1965	Succeeded by George Francis Hutchins
