= Richard Dawes (educationalist) =

British clergyman

Richard Dawes (baptized 13 April 1793, died 10 March 1867) was an English cleric and educationalist. He was the Dean of Hereford from 1850.

== Life ==
Richard Dawes was baptised on 13 April 1793 at Hawes in Yorkshire, the son of James Dawes, who farmed an estate at Hawes, and his wife, Isabella. He had at least three younger brothers. He was educated at the school of the blind Quaker mathematician John Gough at Kendal and proceeded to Trinity College, Cambridge, where he was admitted as a sizar in 1813. He was made a scholar in 1816 and graduated BA as fourth wrangler in 1817, proceeding M.A. in 1820. From 1818 to 1836 Dawes was mathematical tutor, fellow, and bursar of the newly founded Downing College, Cambridge. He was ordained in 1818 and also held the college living of Tadlow, Cambridgeshire, from 1820 to 1840. At this time Dawes was strongly influenced by the contemporary circle of notable Cambridge scientists, including William Whewell, John Stevens Henslow, and Adam Sedgwick. In 1836 he married Mary Helen, daughter of Alexander Gordon, Esq. of Logie, Aberdeenshire and step-daughter of George James Guthrie, Esq. In 1837 Sir John Mill, his former pupil at Downing, presented him to the rectory of King's Somborne, Hampshire, where he built a school and developed his ideas on educating the poor. In 1850 he was appointed Dean of Hereford and died of paralysis at the deanery, Hereford, on 10 March 1867, and was buried in the Ladye Arbour of the cathedral. He was survived by his wife.

== Legacy ==
Dawes is remembered for his seminal contribution to the development of applied science in elementary education: traditional teaching was replaced with heuristic learning and a rudimentary laboratory was established to promote the use of technical apparatus and simple scientific experiments.
