= Hedley Ringrose =

Archdeacon of Cheltenham (1942–2021)

Hedley Sidney Ringrose (29 June 1942 – 15 April 2021) was the Archdeacon of Cheltenham from 1998 to 2009.

Ringrose studied for ordination at Salisbury Theological College and was ordained in 1969. After curacies at Bishopston, Bristol and Easthampstead he was Vicar of St George, Gloucester from 1975 to 1988, during which period he was Rural Dean of Gloucester City; and then of Cirencester until his appointment as Archdeacon.

Ringrose played an active role in the education community and was a school governor. He was on the Governing Board of St Mary’s Calne from 2011 and was also a governor of Rendcomb College.

== Notes ==
Church of England titles
Preceded by John Lewis	Archdeacon of Cheltenham; 1998–2009	Succeeded by Robert Springett
