= Norman Rathbone =

British priest (1914–1995)

Norman Stanley Rathbone (8 September 1914 – 13 July 1995) was an Anglican priest in the second half of the 20th century.

He was educated at Rugby and Christ's College, Cambridge and ordained in 1939. He was Curate then Vicar of St Mary Magdalen, Coventry and after that a Canon Residentiary at Lincoln Cathedral. In 1969 he became Dean of Hereford, a post he held until his retirement in 1981.

He is buried in Dore Abbey churchyard.

== Notes ==
Church of England titles
Preceded by Robert Peel Price	Dean of Hereford; 1969–1981	Succeeded by Peter Haynes
