= Edward Long Fox (physician) =

English physician (1832–1902)

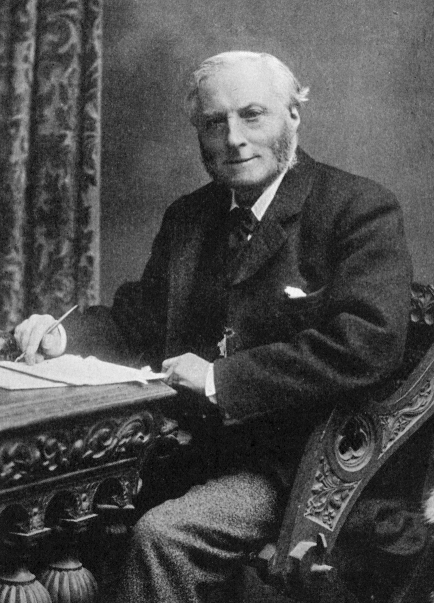
- Born: 1832; Brislington, Bristol, England
- Died: 28 March 1902 (aged 69–70); Bristol, England

Edward Long Fox (1832 – 28 March 1902) was an English physician.

Fox was the eldest son of Dr. Francis Ker Fox and the grandson of Edward Long Fox (1761–1835) another prominent physician. He graduated from Balliol College, Oxford, where he started a long-term friendship with Henry Acland. In 1854 he moved to London, where he studied and worked at the College of Chemistry and St. George's Hospital, graduating as M.B. in 1857 and M.D. in 1861. He then returned to Bristol, where for 20 years he was a physician to the Royal Infirmary. In parallel, he taught medicine and pathological anatomy at the Bristol medical school and Clifton College. He was also examiner in medicine at the Oxford University and wrote several articles for the Quain's Dictionary of Medicine. In 1894, he was elected as president of the National Temperance League.

Fox died in Bristol in 1902 due to a long illness. He was survived by one son and several daughters. The annual Long Fox lecture at University College, Bristol, was established in his honour.
