= Edward Grey (bishop) =

Bishop of Hereford

The Right Reverend and Honourable Edward Grey
- Bishop of Hereford
- Diocese: Diocese of Hereford
- In office: 1832–1837
- Predecessor: George Huntingford
- Successor: Thomas Musgrave
- Other post: Dean of Hereford (1830–1832)

Personal details
- Born: 25 March 1782
- Died: 24 June 1837 (aged 55)
- Education: Eton College; Christ Church, Oxford

Edward Grey (25 March 1782 – 24 June 1837) was an Anglican bishop who served in the Church of England as the Bishop of Hereford from 1832 to 1837.

Grey was a son of Charles Grey, 1st Earl Grey, and the brother of Charles Grey, 2nd Earl Grey, the Prime Minister. From 1801, when his father was created a peer, he was entitled to the style The Honourable. He was educated at Eton College, and matriculated at Christ Church, Oxford in 1799, graduating B.A. 1803, M.A. 1806, B.D. & D.D. 1831.

He held livings at St Mary, Whickham, County Durham (1816–1828) and St Botolph-without-Bishopsgate, London (1828–1832). He was Dean of Hereford from 1830 to 1832; and a canon of Westminster Abbey from 1833.

He was nominated to become Bishop of Hereford by William IV on 4 May 1832 and consecrated as a bishop on 20 May 1832. He died in office on 24 June 1837. His son, William Grey, served as Governor of Jamaica.
