= William Leigh (Dean of Hereford) =

Anglican priest (1752–1808)

William Leigh (1752, Rushall, Herefordshire – 1808, Hereford) was an Anglican priest in the late 18th and early 19th centuries.

Leigh was educated at Harrow and Trinity College, Cambridge. He held livings at Little Plumstead, Witton and Brundall.

Church of England titles
Preceded by Nathan Wetherell	Dean of Hereford; 1807–1808	Succeeded by George Gretton
