= Robert Price (priest) =

Robert Peel Price (18 September 1905 – 26 December 1981) was an Anglican priest in the mid 20th century.

He was educated at Dover College and Wadham College, Oxford and ordained in 1931 . He held curacies at St Mary, Wimbledon; St Martin's, Knowle; St Oswald, Cheam and St Peter, Bournemouth, and was then Vicar of Christchurch from 1945 until 1961. In that year he became Dean of Hereford, a post he held until his retirement in 1968.

== Notes ==
Church of England titles
Preceded by Hedley Robert Burrows	Dean of Hereford; 1961–1968	Succeeded by Norman Stanley Rathbone
