= National Temperance League (Great Britain) =

Defunct British temperance organisation

The National Temperance League was a British organisation established in June 1856, through an amalgamation of two others: the National Temperance Society and the London Temperance League. Its Presidents included Samuel Bowly, Edward Long Fox, and Wentworth Leigh.

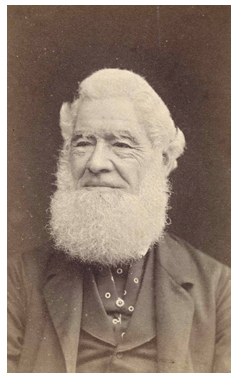
Samuel Bowly, President, National Temperance League

== Object ==
The League sought to promote temperance by the practice and advocacy of total abstinence from intoxicating beverages.

The object of this Society was to persuade the community that abstinence from strong drink as a common beverage was the most efficient means of reclaiming alcoholics, and of preserving the sober from habits of intemperance. The success of these efforts was considered to be highly encouraging. The League's headquarters were located at 337, Strand, London.

== Membership ==
The League consisted of persons of all genders, who subscribed their names to a pledge or declaration of abstinence from all intoxicating beverages, and who contributed to the funds of the League not less than 2s. 6d. per annum. Contributions were accepted from all friends of temperance, whether abstainers or not.

== Agencies ==
The League's agencies were comprehensive and nonscctarian. It assisted local societies and individual workers, and sought to accomplish its object by means of public meetings, lectures, sermons, tract distribution, domiciliary visitation; conferences with the clergy, medical practitioners, schoolmasters, magistrates, and other persons of influence; deputations to teachers and students in universities, colleges, training institutions and schools; missionary efforts amongst sailors, soldiers, the militia, the police, and other classes.

It provided support and was connected with the Ladies National Association for the Promotion of Temperance (established 1860) and The Ladies' National Temperance Convention of 1876.

== Outcomes ==
The operations of the League were largely instrumental in awakening public attention to the necessity for effective measures against Intemperance, as well as in promoting distinctive temperance action amongst clergymen and ministers of different denominations, the medical profession, teachers of children, and other influential bodies. A gratifying degree of success was achieved by its efforts to advance sobriety in the Army and Navy.

== Organ ==
In 1856, The Weekly Record of the Temperance Movement was commenced, in London, by William Tweedie, and was continued thereafter as the organ of the National Temperance League under the title of The Temperance Record.

== Jubilee celebration ==
The Jubilee Fête at The Crystal Palace on September 2, 1879, was an attempt on the part of the National Temperance League to organise a celebration upon a general scale, and in this they were largely successful. Delegates were invited from every part of the U.K., and the following organisations were represented on the programme of the day's proceedings:-The British Temperance League; the United Kingdom Alliance; the North of England Temperance League; the Western Temperance League; the Midland Temperance League; the Dorset County Association; the Order of Rechabites; the two Orders of Good Templars; the Sons of Temperance; the Blue-Ribbon Army; the Metropolitan Open-Air Mission; the Band of Hope Union; the Baptist Association; the Congregational Association; and the Church of England Temperance Society. The occasion was a highly representative one. The programme included a Jubilee Conference, presided over by Edward Baines. Historical papers were read by the Rev. Dawson Burns, M.A., Dr. Norman Kerr, Rev. Dr. Valpy French, Captain H. D. Grant, C.B., Rev. Canon Ellison, and by Mr. Michael Young. A meeting took place in the Concert Room, where speeches were made by Mr. Gough and Mr. A. M. Sullivan, M.P. More than 32,000 persons were present.

== Leadership ==
- Samuel Bowly, President (1881)
- George Cruikshank, vice-president (1856)
- Edward Long Fox, President (1894)
- Victor Horsley, Vice-president
- Wentworth Leigh, President (1920)
- Annie Henrietta Yorke, Vice-president
