= Peter Haynes (priest) =

Anglican priest (1925–2018)

Peter Haynes (24 April 1925 – 17 March 2018) was an Anglican priest in the late 20th century.

He was born on 24 April 1925, educated at Selwyn College, Cambridge and ordained in 1953. He held curacies at Stokesley and Hessle after which he was Vicar of Drypool. From 1963 to 1970 he was Bishop's Chaplain for Youth in the Diocese of Bath and Wells then Vicar of Glastonbury. In 1974 he became Archdeacon of Wells and a Canon Residentiary at the Cathedral. In 1982 he was appointed Dean of Hereford, a post he held for a decade. In 1988 Haynes proposed the sale of the Mappa Mundi to finance cathedral repairs.

He died on 17 March 2018 at the age of 92.

== Notes ==
Church of England titles
Preceded by Norman Stanley Rathbone	Dean of Hereford; 1982–1992	Succeeded by Robert Andrew Willis
