= Mark Barrington-Ward =

British newspaper editor (1927–2021)

- Born: 25 October 1927
- Died: 23 October 2021 (aged 93)
- Education: Balliol College, Oxford
- Occupation: Journalist
- Known for: Newspaper editor
- Spouse(s): Catherine Barrington-Ward (died 2012)
- Relatives: Robert McGowan Barrington-Ward (father), Simon Barrington-Ward (brother)

Mark Barrington-Ward (25 October 1927 – 23 October 2021) was a British newspaper editor. He also served as the President of The Uganda Society between 1957 and 1958.

== Life ==
Barrington-Ward was the son of Robert McGowan Barrington-Ward (1891–1948), who served with distinction in the Duke of Cornwall's Light Infantry and was editor of The Times 1941–48.

Like his father, Barrington-Ward studied at Balliol College, Oxford (reading modern history 1948–51), served in the DCLI and became a newspaper editor.

He died on 23 October 2021 at the age of 93. He had four children and eight grandchildren.

== Newspaper career ==
Barrington-Ward began in journalism as a trainee on the Manchester Guardian in 1951. In 1955 he became the founding editor of the Uganda Argus. In 1960 he joined the Westminster Press in England. With the Westminster Press he was editor of the Northern Echo 1960–61, editor of the Oxford Mail 1961–79 and London Editor from 1979 until his retirement in 1992.

== Oxford ==
Barrington-Ward continued to live in Oxford after editing the Oxford Mail. From 2004 to 2010 he was President of Oxford Civic Society.

== See also ==
- The Uganda Argus

== Sources ==
- Barrington-Ward, Mark (2010). Forty Years of Oxford Planning: What has it achieved, and what next?. Oxford: Oxford Civic Society. pp. author's biography on rear cover.
