= Winchester College War Cloister =

Grade I listed war memorial in Hampshire, United Kingdom

Coordinates: 51°03′27″N 1°18′53″W

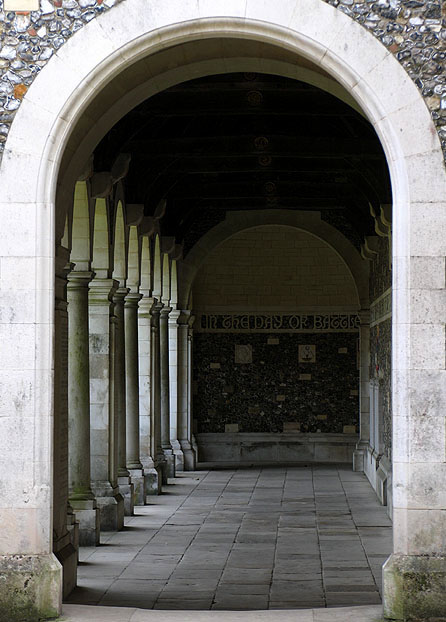
Inside the Winchester College War Cloister, opened 1924

The Winchester College War Cloister is a war memorial at Winchester College, in Hampshire, designed by the architect Sir Herbert Baker. The roofed quadrangle is said by Historic England to be the largest known private war memorial in Europe. It became a Grade II listed building in 1950, and was upgraded to Grade I in 2017, as one of 24 war memorials in England designed by Baker that were designated by Historic England as a national collection.

== Background ==
The memorial was a project of the school's headmaster Montague Rendall, to commemorate the 500 Wykehamists killed in the First World War, at a time when the total number of boys at the school was around 450; a similar number of Wykehamists were wounded in the war, and around 900 were awarded decorations for gallantry. Around 2,500 former pupils, quiristers, and staff from the Winchester College served in the British armed forces in the war; four were awarded the Victoria Cross: Captain Arthur Kilby, Second Lieutenant Dennis Hewitt, and Lieutenant Colonel Charles Doughty-Wylie (all posthumously), and Lieutenant Colonel Daniel Burges (who was the only one of the four to survive the war).

The first proposal for a school memorial made as early as 1915. The initial suggestion for a memorial hall expanded over time to include proposals for a new suite of rooms around a cloister. Baker was engaged as the architect, and made initial suggestions in April 1918. The large project was abandoned in 1921 due to lack of funds, and the proposals were scaled back to comprise a new cloister, together with rebuilding the reredos and a new altar by W. D. Caröe for the school chapel, and funds to educate the sons of Wykehamists killed in the war. (Baker was also commissioned to design a memorial cloister for his own school, at Tonbridge, but the project was abandoned on grounds of cost.)

The new cloister was constructed to the southwest of the school's original medieval buildings – Outer Court, Chamber Court, and a cloister – which were erected in the 1390s by its founder William of Wykeham. A foundation stone for the new War Cloister was laid by Edward Grey, 1st Viscount Grey of Fallodon on 15 July 1922.

== Architecture ==
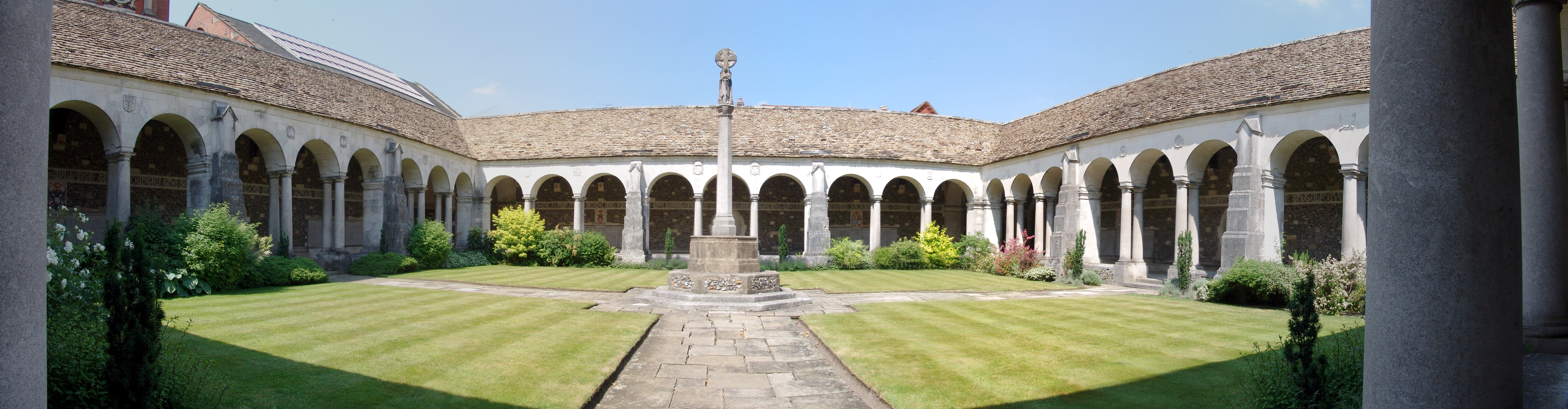
Panorama of the War Cloister in 2006

The War Cloister was constructed from knapped flint and Portland stone ashlars. The cloister arcade is made of Portland stone, with round-headed arches supported by Tuscan columns. A crown-post oak structure supports a roof of Purbeck stone tiles. Badges from 120 regiments, in which men from the school served, decorate the walls, corbels and roof beams, to designs by George Kruger Gray which were painted by Laurence Arthur Turner. The roof also has carved wooden angels, and above the main arches over the paths that cross at the centre of the cloister are the badges from four regiments particularly associated with the school: the Rifle Brigade, the King's Royal Rifle Corps, the Hampshire Regiment, and the Royal Artillery. There is an apse at each of the four corners of the cloister which are dedicated to: South Africa (southeast), Australia (southwest), Canada (northwest), and India (northeast). Each apse has a large circular stone floor slab: granite from Table Mountain in South Africa, syenite from New South Wales, marble from Texada Island in British Columbia, and black marble from Budh Gaya in India. Four small stones from Ypres set into the floor near the Meads Gate to the east. The names of those killed in the First World War are listed on the outer wall of the cloister, on tablets of Hopton Wood Stone; each of the outer walls bears a pair of large tablets, eight in all, each comprising six smaller panels listing the names.

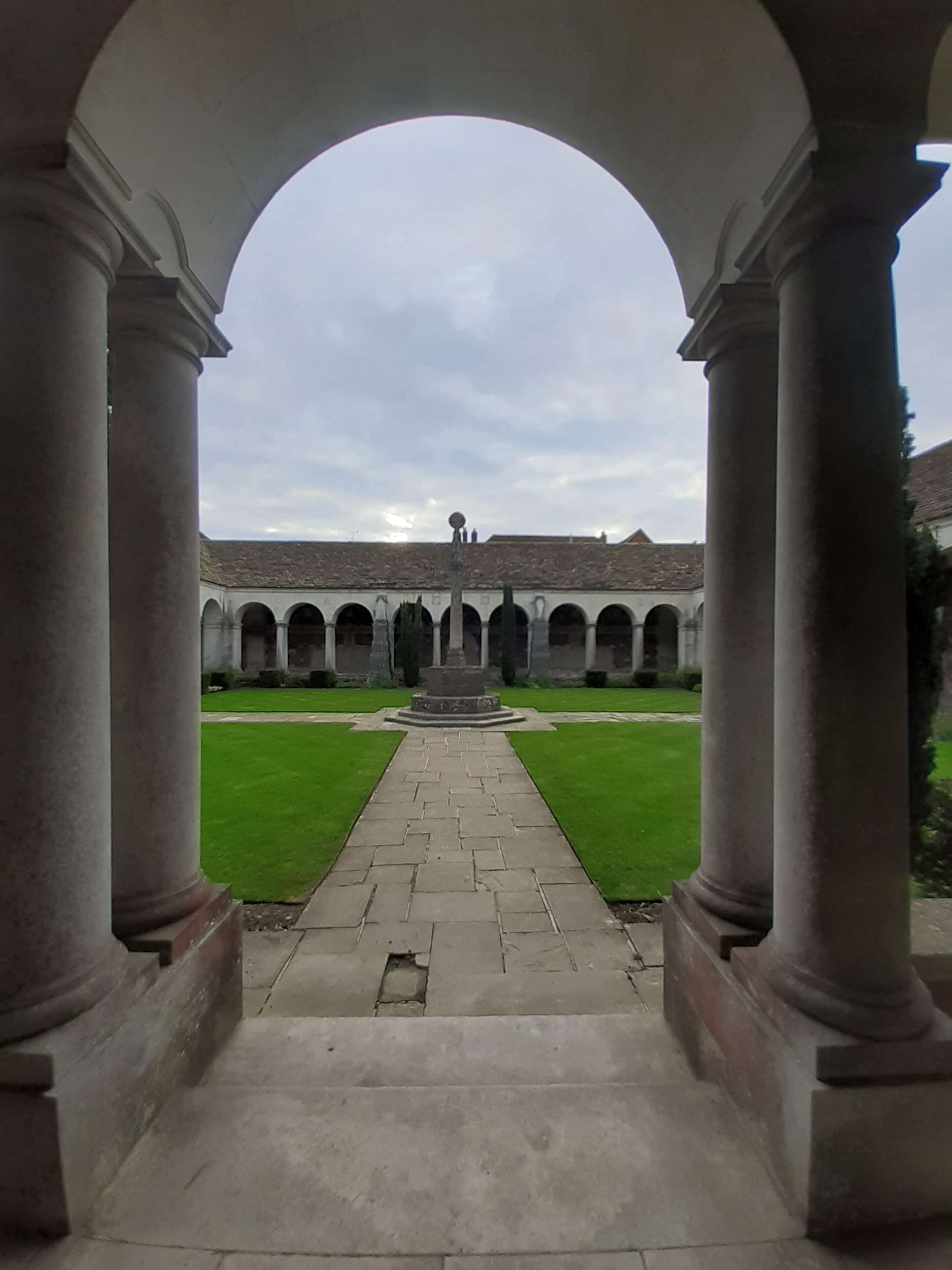
Winchester College War Cloister from eastern entrance

Within the cloister is a garden designed by Gertrude Jekyll, with roses and white lilies, and four grass lawns separated by paths leading to a central memorial cross made by the sculptor Alfred Turner, with a wheel-headed Latin cross supported by an octagonal shaft on an octagonal plinth with three steps. To either side of the cross is the carved figure of a crusader knight. Baker had proposed a similar design of wheel-headed memorial cross to the Imperial War Graves Commission (now Commonwealth War Graves Commission), but a different design by Sir Reginald Blomfield was selected instead: the Cross of Sacrifice familiar at many CWGC cemeteries.

The school's art master Reginald Gleadowe designed the main gate leading to the Meads to the east, which is decorated with angels blowing trumpets. Above the arch of the entrance is a carving of the school's patron, St Mary, by Charles Wheeler. The cloister is also accessible from Kingsgate Street to the west, through the South Africa Gate which commemorates the Wykehamists killed in the Second Boer War. The Victory Gate to the south leads to other school buildings. Gleadowe also designed the Lombardic script used for the main flushwork inscription running around the outer wall of the cloister.

THANKS BE TO GOD FOR THE SERVICE OF THESE FIVE HUNDRED WYKEHAMISTS, WHO WERE FOUND FAITHFUL UNTO DEATH AMID THE MANIFOLD CHANCES OF THE GREAT WAR. IN THE DAY OF BATTLE THEY FORGAT NOT GOD, WHO CREATED THEM TO DO HIS WILL, NOR THEIR COUNTRY, THE STRONGHOLD OF FREEDOM, NOR THEIR SCHOOL, THE MOTHER OF GODLINESS AND DISCIPLINE. STRONG IN THIS THREEFOLD FAITH THEY WENT FORTH FROM HOME AND KINDRED TO THE BATTLEFIELDS OF THE WORLD AND, TREADING THE PATH OF DUTY AND SACRIFICE, LAID DOWN THEIR LIVES FOR MANKIND. THOU, THEREFORE, FOR WHOM THEY DIED, SEEK NOT THINE OWN, BUT SERVE AS THEY SERVED, AND IN PEACE OR IN WAR BEAR THYSELF EVER AS CHRIST'S SOLDIER, GENTLE IN ALL THINGS, VALIANT IN ACTION, STEADFAST IN ADVERSITY

== History ==
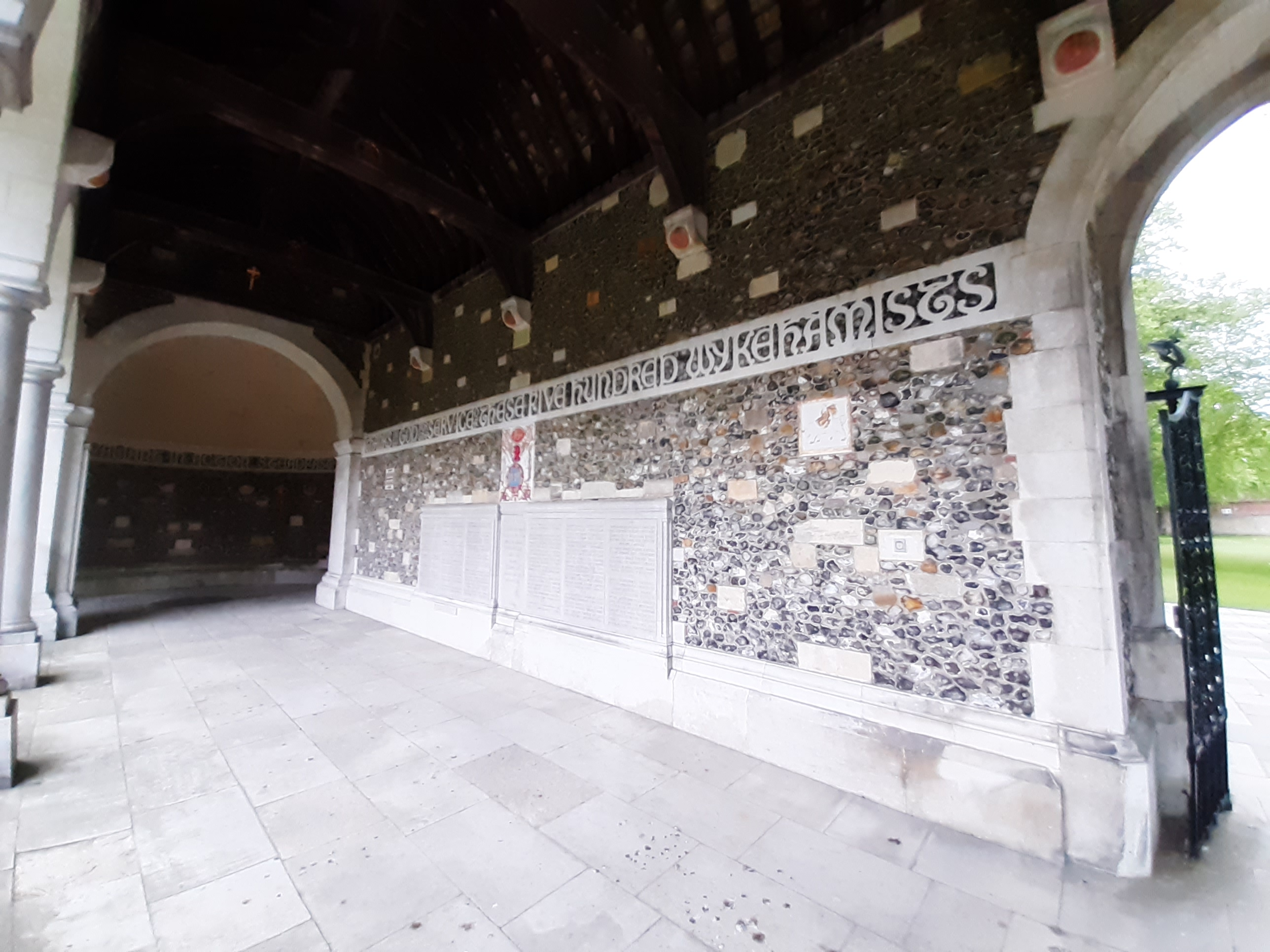
Winchester College War Cloister, east colonnade

The completed cloister was dedicated on 31 May 1924, at a ceremony attended by Prince Arthur, Duke of Connaught and Strathearn, the former Bishop of Winchester Edward Talbot, and Edward Grey, 1st Viscount Grey of Fallodon, who delivered an address. Winchester College OTC formed the guard of honour, with music from the band of the Coldstream Guards. Montague Rendall retired later that year. It became a school tradition for staff and pupils to raise their hats on entering the cloister, to recognise the school's war dead.

Baker's work at the War Cloister influenced his designs for the larger memorial at Tyne Cot, the largest cemetery for Commonwealth forces in the world for any war. Baker was responsible for the design of 113 cemeteries on the Western Front, including Tyne Cot, and for Delville Wood South African National Memorial and Neuve-Chapelle Indian Memorial. He was knighted in 1926.

A further 2,500 Wykehamists served in the Second World War, and the names of another 285 casualties from the Second World War are listed on the inner columns, on twelve panels grouped in six pairs. Opposite the Meads Gate, a bronze bust commemorates Air Chief Marshal Hugh Dowding. The War Cloister was re-dedicated on 14 November 1948 by the Bishop of Winchester Mervyn Haigh, with an address by Field Marshal Archibald Wavell, 1st Earl Wavell.

The War Cloister's 100th anniversary year was marked by a further rededication on the 15th June 2024 by the Bishop of Winchester Philip Mounstephen, with an address from General Sir Nick Carter). Music was provided by Royal Marines Band Service. The school colours, given in 2010, were carried by the Winchester College Combined Cadet Force
