= Falkner Allison =

British Anglican bishop

- Bishop of Winchester
- Allison in October 1961.
- Diocese: Diocese of Winchester
- Elected: c. 1961
- Term ended: 1974 (retirement)
- Predecessor: Alwyn Williams
- Successor: John Taylor
- Other posts: Bishop of Chelmsford (1951–1961); Principal of Ridley Hall (1945–1950)

Orders
- Ordination: 1931 (deacon); 1932 (priest)
- Consecration: c. 1951

Personal details
- Born: Sherard Falkner Allison; 19 January 1907 Stafford, Staffordshire, United Kingdom
- Died: 31 May 1993 (aged 86) Ipswich, Suffolk, United Kingdom
- Denomination: Anglican
- Parents: William & Emily
- Spouse: Ruth Hills (m. 1936)
- Children: 2 sons & 2 daughters
- Education: Jesus College, Cambridge

Sherard Falkner Allison (19 January 1907 – 31 May 1993) was a British Anglican bishop and successively the Bishop of Chelmsford and the Bishop of Winchester.

== Early life, family and education ==
Allison was born in Stafford on 19 January 1907 while his father, William Sherard Allison, was Vicar of St Thomas' Church, Stafford. He was born into a clergy family – besides his father, his mother Emily Beatrice's father (James Wheeler) and brother (Harold Wheeler) were already vicars – and Falkner's three brothers also became priests – Oliver Allison became Bishop in the Sudan while Roger and Gordon remained vicars. Falkner (who was always known by his second forename) was educated at Dean Close School, Cheltenham as a child before studying as a Scholar at Jesus College, Cambridge and training for the ministry at Ridley Hall, Cambridge.

== Priestly career ==
Having been made deacon on Trinity Sunday 1931 (31 May), by Linton Smith, Bishop of Rochester, at Rochester Cathedral, Allison served his title post as curate of St James's Church, Tunbridge Wells until 1934, being ordained priest on Trinity Sunday (22 May) 1932, by Smith at Rochester Cathedral. He then became Chaplain of Ridley Hall, Cambridge and examining chaplain to the Bishop of Bradford, Alfred Blunt until 1936, when he became Vicar of Rodbourne Cheney. In 1940, Allison became Vicar of Erith until he was appointed Principal of Ridley Hall in 1945, where he served until his election as Bishop of Chelmsford. During his time at Ridley, he was also examining chaplain to the bishop of Rochester (until 1947) and to the bishop of Ely (from 1947).

== Episcopal career ==
Allison was consecrated a bishop by Geoffrey Fisher, Archbishop of Canterbury, on 2 February 1951 at Westminster Abbey, having presumably been elected and confirmed as Bishop of Chelmsford shortly before. He served as the diocesan bishop for Essex and East London for ten years before he was made Bishop of Winchester in 1961 – his election to that see was confirmed in late December 1961. He remained in Winchester until his retirement in 1974, during which time he was ex officio a Lord Spiritual and Prelate of the Order of the Garter. Having retired to Aldeburgh, Allison died on 31 May 1993, aged 86.

== Styles and titles ==
- 1931–1951: The Reverend Falkner Allison
- 1951–1993: The Right Reverend Falkner Allison

== Works ==
- The Christian Life (1938) with Douglas Ernest William Harrison

== Sources ==
- "Allison, Sherard Falkner". Who's Who & Who Was Who. Vol. 1920–2007 (December 2012 online ed.). A & C Black. (Subscription or UK public library membership required.)
- The Independent – Obituary: Falkner Allison (Accessed 1 February 2014)

Church of England titles
| Preceded by Henry Wilson | Bishop of Chelmsford; 1951–1961 | Succeeded by John Tiarks |
| Preceded by Alwyn Williams | Bishop of Winchester; 1961–1974 | Succeeded by John Taylor |
