= MV Llangibby Castle =

British passenger liner and troopship

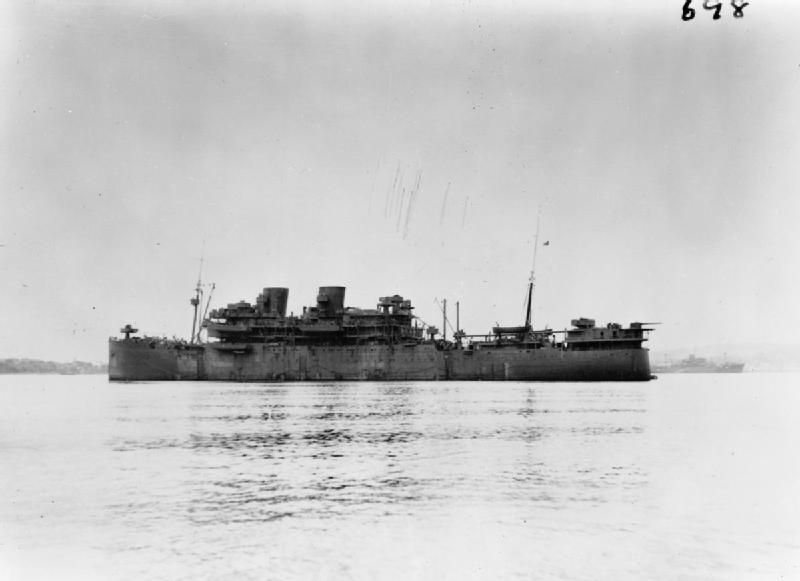
- In naval service during World War II

History

United Kingdom
- Name: MV Llangibby Castle
- Owner: Union-Castle Mail Steamship Company
- Port of registry: (United Kingdom)
- Builder: Harland & Wolff, Govan, Glasgow
- Yard number: 841
- Launched: 4 July 1929
- Completed: 21 November 1929
- Fate: Sold for scrapping on 29 June 1954

General characteristics
- Type: Passenger liner
- Tonnage: 11,951 gross register tons (GRT)
- Length: 485 ft 7 in (148.01 m)
- Beam: 66 ft 2 in (20.17 m)
- Depth: 29 ft 5 in (8.97 m)
- Propulsion: Twin Screw – 4S. SA; 2 × 8 Cylinder Burmeister & Wain; 1300 NHP
- Speed: 14.5 knots (26.9 km/h)

MV Llangibby Castle was a passenger liner of the Union-Castle Line, operating between 1929 and 1954. The ship was named after the castle at Llangybi, Monmouthshire. The ship was constructed by Harland & Wolff, at their shipyard in Govan, Glasgow. She was the first ship to utilise pressure charging in combination with exhaust gas boilers. The ship was principally employed by the company on the Round Africa service.

In 1940, the Llangibby Castle transported a number of Germans, who had been deported from Kenya and Tanganyika, due to the commencement of the Second World War, to Genoa, Italy. This occurred during the Phoney War, before Italy had formally entered the war against Britain and France. She was damaged during an air raid while docked in Liverpool on the night of on 21/22 December 1940.

== Troopship ==
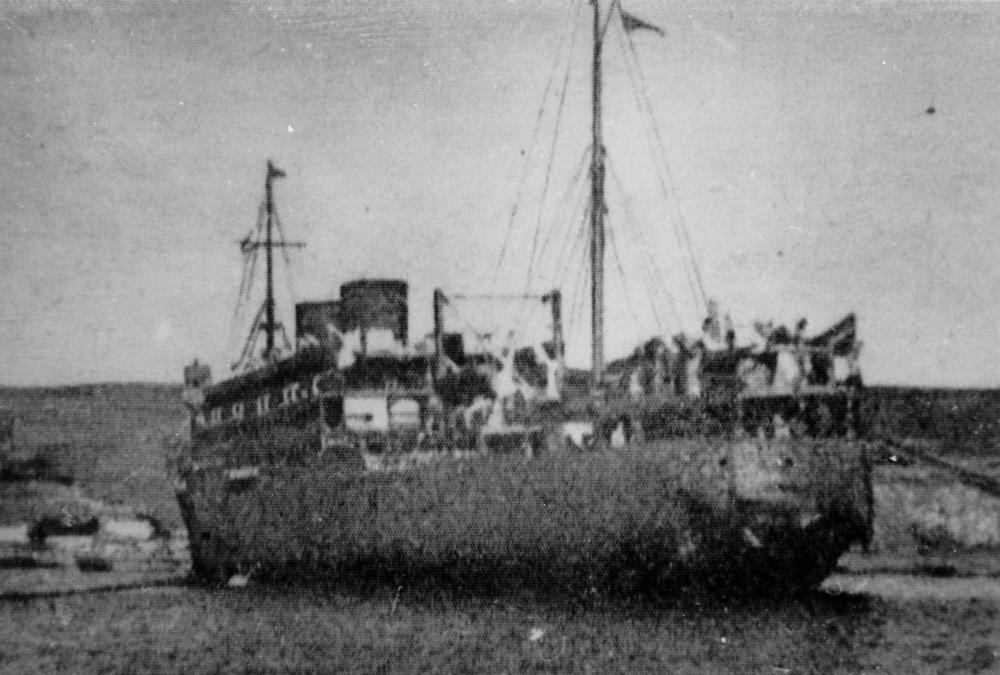
Llangibby Castle in the Azores, after being torpedoed by U-402

While sailing as a troopship, the Llangibby Castle was torpedoed on 16 January 1942 by the German submarine U-402, under the command of Siegfried von Forstner, during U-402's second patrol in the Bay of Biscay. The torpedo hit the Llangibby Castle's stern, killing 26 people and blowing away her after gun and the rudder. Her engines were still operational and she was able to limp to Horta, in the Azores, steering with her engines, and only making 9 knots (17 km/h). During the voyage she had to fight off attacks from German Focke-Wulf Fw 200 "Condor" long range patrol bombers. She arrived safely at Horta on 19 January, but could only stop for 14 days as Portugal was a neutral country. After making some repairs she prepared to sail again for Gibraltar on 2 February, escorted by the destroyers HMS Croome, HMS Westcott and HMS Exmoor, and towed by the tugboat Thames. The convoy was followed by several U-boats, but escaped damage, with Westcott sinking U-581. The small convoy arrived at Gibraltar on 8 February, where the troops were disembarked, and some temporary repairs carried out. Llangibby Castle sailed for Britain on 6 April, still lacking a rudder. She arrived in Britain on 13 April, having sailed 3400 miles with a damaged stern and steering by engines, an achievement which led to her master, a man named Bayer, being awarded the OBE.

After full repairs, Llangibby Castle returned to service as a troopship, and took part in Operation Torch on 9 November 1942, during which she was hit by a shell from a shore battery, and had one man killed. On 25 November, after detraining their Matilda, Valentine and Crusader tanks, trucks and supplies at the railway goods yard in Greenock, on the west coast of Scotland, both A & B Armoured Squadrons of the 2nd Lothians and Border Horse loaded their battle equipment and crews on the Llangibby Castle, with C Squadron arriving the next day. In all, some 52 tanks, 11 light tanks, 6 scout cars and an armoured command vehicle along with at least a dozen large 3-ton trucks, 15-cwt trucks and numerous motorcycles and spares were loaded. At 0630hrs on Saturday 28 November, she sailed fully loaded destination unknown, thought to be either the Pacific islands, Europe or Africa. Sailing orders were open on the journey and as the large invasion convoy passed Ireland it made a turn towards the Mediterranean Sea to land troops at Bon (now Annaba), Tunisia, right on the doorstep of Axis held North Africa. However, at 2230hrs Friday 4 December whilst zig-zagging in the darkness as she entered the Mediterranean, she was involved in a serious collision and Boat Stations were immediately sounded and all troops onboard made preparations for the lifeboats. It was soon learned she had seriously damaged her bows and forty-five minutes later at 0015hrs on Saturday morning the all clear was given. However it was soon obvious she was unable to continue her journey to Bon. Instead she put into the nearest friendly port, arriving several hours later in Gibraltar at 0730hrs. The Lothians and Border Horse hastily unloaded their heavy armoured cargo at 2100hrs on the evening of 5 December. Under great pressure to keep up with the Allied invasion fleet, of which they were to be the spearhead of the invasion force at Bon, four and half hours later had fully loaded all their tanks and equipment in the Llanstephan Castle. The ship cast off in darkness at 2000hrs the next evening for Bon. After being repaired in the UK, the Llangibby Castle underwent conversion to a Landing Ship, Infantry.

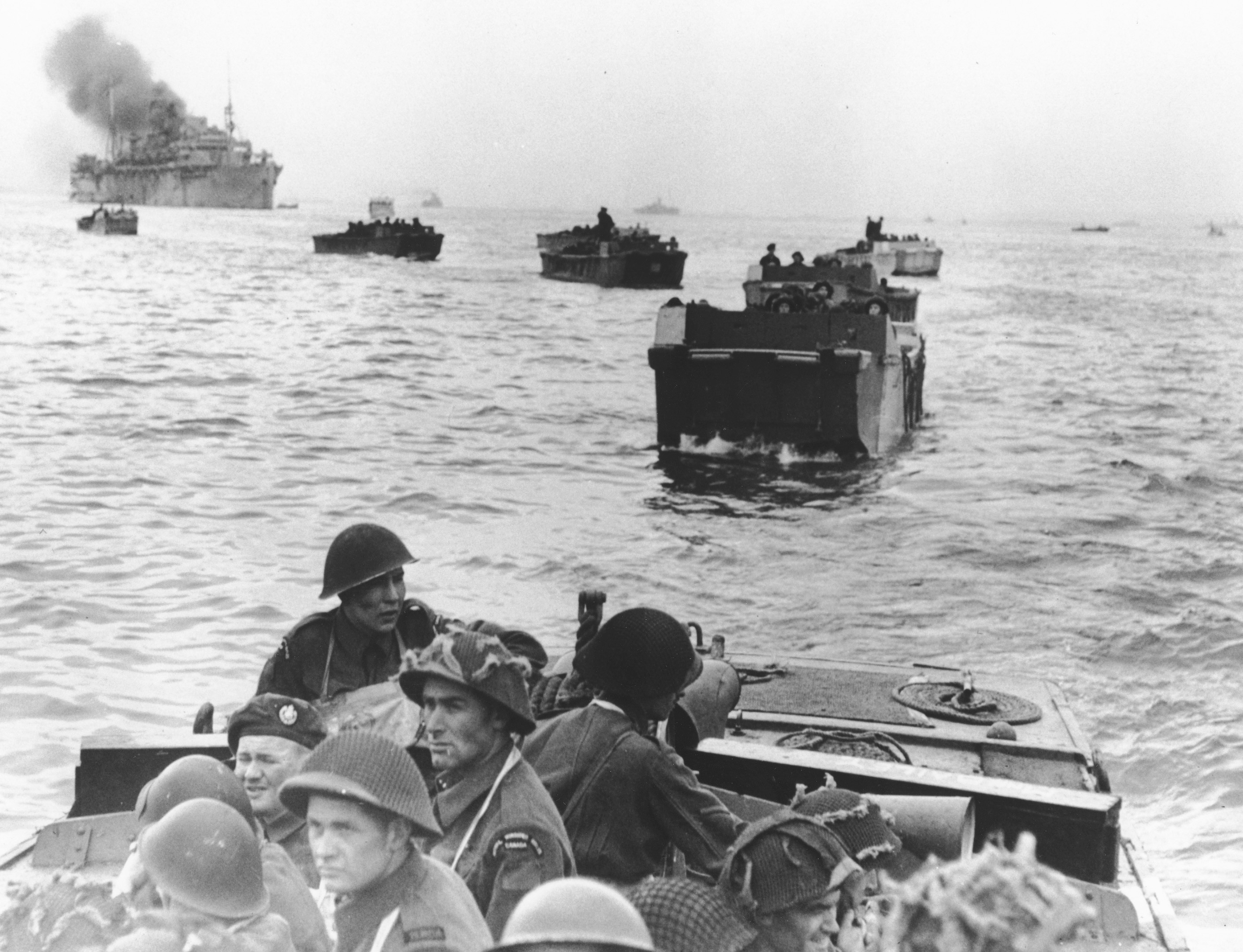
Canadian landings at Juno Beach in the Landing Craft Assault. Llangibby Castle can be seen in the upper left.

After working up in Loch Fyne, she was used to transport troops in the Mediterranean, and was assigned to the Normandy landings in 1944, carrying over 1,500 Canadian troops to Juno Beach. She landed the troops in two waves, and was later moved to land troops at Omaha and Utah Beaches, and at Le Havre. She spent the last year of the war as a troopship in the Far East.

== Post war ==
Robert McGowan Barrington-Ward, the Editor of The Times died while he was a passenger on the ship in 1948 at Dar es Salaam. In December 1949, again at Dar es Salaam, the ship had a serious fire in the cargo hold.

== Fate ==
The ship was broken up at Newport Docks at the John Cashmore yard on 12 July 1954.
