= Michael Manktelow =

English bishop (1927–2017)

- Bishop of Basingstoke
- Diocese: Diocese of Winchester
- In office: 1977–1993
- Predecessor: Colin James
- Successor: Geoffrey Rowell
- Other posts: honorary assistant bishop in Chichester and in Europe (1994–2017)

Orders
- Ordination: 1953 (deacon); 1954 (priest)
- Consecration: 30 March 1977

Personal details
- Born: 23 September 1927
- Died: 24 July 2017 (aged 89)
- Denomination: Anglican
- Parents: Sir Richard & Helen, Lady Manktelow
- Spouse: Rosamund Mann (m. 1966)
- Children: three daughters
- Profession: Writer (biographer)
- Education: Christ's College, Cambridge

Michael Richard John Manktelow (23 September 1927 – 24 July 2017) was an Anglican bishop. He was the suffragan Bishop of Basingstoke from 1977 to 1993 and at the same time a Canon Residentiary of Winchester Cathedral.

Manktelow was educated at Whitgift School and Christ's College, Cambridge and was made deacon at Michaelmas 1953 (20 September) and ordained priest the Michaelmas following (19 September 1954) — both times by Maurice Harland, Bishop of Lincoln, at Lincoln Cathedral, before a curacy at Boston, Lincolnshire, after which he was Vicar of Knaresborough. Following this he was Vicar of St. Wilfrid's Church, Harrogate and then, his final appointment before his ordination to the episcopate, Rural Dean of the area. He was consecrated a bishop on 31 March 1977, by Donald Coggan, Archbishop of Canterbury at Westminster Abbey. In retirement he served as an honorary assistant bishop in the Dioceses of Chichester and in Europe.

Church of England titles
Preceded by Colin James	Bishop of Basingstoke; 1977–1993	Succeeded by Geoffrey Rowell
