= Alwyn Williams (bishop) =

English bishop (1888–1968)

The Right Reverend Alwyn Williams
- Bishop of Winchester
- Church: Church of England
- Diocese: Winchester
- In office: 1952–1961
- Predecessor: Mervyn Haigh
- Successor: Falkner Allison
- Other posts: Headmaster of Winchester College (1924–1934); Dean of Christ Church (1934–1939); Bishop of Durham (1939–1952)

Orders
- Ordination: 21 December 1913 (deacon); 20 December 1914 (priest) by Charles Gore, Bishop of Oxford
- Consecration: 25 March 1939 by William Temple, Archbishop of York

Personal details
- Born: 20 July 1888 Barrow-in-Furness, Lancashire, England
- Died: 18 February 1968 (aged 79) Charmouth, Dorset, England
- Buried: Winchester Cathedral
- Denomination: Anglican
- Parents: John Williams & Adeline née Peter
- Spouse: Margaret née Stewart (m. 1914; she d. 1958)
- Profession: cleric, headteacher
- Education: Jesus College, Oxford

Alwyn Terrell Petre Williams (20 July 1888 – 18 February 1968) was Bishop of Durham (1939–1952) and then Bishop of Winchester (1952–1961).

== Family and education ==
Born the eldest son of John (a physician) and Adeline (née Peter) Williams, at Barrow-in-Furness, Lancashire, he was educated at Rossall School and then went up to Jesus College, Oxford, where he had a remarkable career. He was a Scholar of his college and took a Triple First in Classical Moderations (1908), Greats (1910), and Modern History (1911), having won the Gladstone Historical Essay in 1909. He was elected a Fellow of All Souls College, Oxford, for the period 1911–1918. Williams married Margaret, née Stewart, of Perthshire, on 23 August 1914; they had no children, and she died in 1958.

== Career ==
He was ordained deacon on St Thomas's day (21 December) 1913 and priest on 20 December 1914—both times by Charles Gore, Bishop of Oxford, at Christ Church Cathedral, Oxford—and soon moved to Winchester College, where he was Assistant Master (1915–1916), Second Master (1916–1924), and Headmaster (1924–1934), having meanwhile been appointed an Honorary Canon of Winchester Cathedral in 1928 and Chaplain to George V in 1931, both of which he gave up in 1934, when he was appointed Dean of Christ Church.

He remained there until 1939, when he was appointed to the episcopate, first as Bishop of Durham (1939–1952) and then as Bishop of Winchester and Prelate to the Order of the Garter (1952–1961). He was ordained (consecrated) a bishop on Lady Day (25 March) 1939, by William Temple, Archbishop of York, in York Minster; his nomination to Winchester was announced on 14 March 1952. He was also the Chairman of the committee that eventually produced the New English Bible (1950–1961). An unobtrusive but much respected cleric, he retired to Charmouth, Dorset, and died at home there seven years later, his funeral service being at Winchester Cathedral. He had become a Doctor of Divinity (DD) several times over—from Oxford in 1925, Durham and St Andrews in 1939, and Glasgow in 1951—and a Doctor of Letters (DLitt) from Southampton in 1962.

Academic offices
Preceded by Montague Rendall	Headmaster of Winchester College; 1924–1934	Succeeded by Spencer Leeson
Church of England titles
Preceded by Hensley Henson	Bishop of Durham; 1939–1952	Succeeded by Michael Ramsey
Preceded by Mervyn Haigh	Bishop of Winchester; 1952–1961	Succeeded by Falkner Allison
Professional and academic associations
Preceded by Hensley Henson	President of the Surtees Society; 1945–52	Succeeded by Frederick Maurice Powicke
