= William Francis Casey =

British journalist (1884–1957)

- Born: William Francis Casey; 2 May 1884; Cape Town, Cape Colony
- Died: 20 April 1957 (aged 72); London, England
- Education: Trinity College, Dublin
- Occupations: Journalist and editor
- Spouse: Amy Gertrude Pearson-Gee

William Francis Casey (2 May 1884 – 20 April 1957) was a journalist and newspaper editor, notably spending most of his working life employed by British newspaper, The Times. He first took employment as a sub-editor shortly before World War I, remaining with the paper until 1952. He was educated at Castleknock College and Trinity College Dublin.

Media offices
Preceded by Robert Barrington-Ward	Deputy Editor of The Times; 1941–1948	Succeeded by Donald Tyerman
Preceded by Robert Barrington-Ward	Editor of The Times; 1948–1952	Succeeded by William Haley
