= Mervyn Haigh =

Anglican clergyman (1887–1962)

The Right Reverend Mervyn Haigh
- Bishop of Winchester
- Haigh in 1937
- Diocese: Winchester
- In office: 1942–1952 (resigned)
- Predecessor: Cyril Garbett
- Successor: Alwyn Williams
- Other posts: Private Secretary to the Archbishop of Canterbury (1924–1931); Bishop of Coventry (1931–1942); Prelate of the Garter (1942–1952)

Personal details
- Born: 14 September 1887 Islington, County of London, United Kingdom
- Died: 20 May 1962 (aged 74) Dolgellau, Gwynedd, UK
- Buried: 26 May 1962, Winchester Cathedral
- Denomination: Anglican
- Parents: Revd Canon William Edward Haigh & Janet Middleton
- Spouse: Unmarried
- Profession: Chaplain; lecturer
- Education: Clifton College, Bristol; New College, Oxford

Ordination history of Mervyn Haigh
History
Diaconal ordination
- Date: 1911
- Place: St Paul's Cathedral, City of London
Priestly ordination
- Date: 1912
- Place: St Paul's Cathedral, City of London
Episcopal consecration
- Date: c. 1931

Mervyn George Haigh (14 September 1887 – 20 May 1962) was an Anglican clergyman who served as the third bishop of the restored see of Coventry in the modern era and the 97th Bishop of Winchester in a long line stretching back to the 7th century.

He was born on 14 September 1887, the son of an Anglican clergyman and was educated at Clifton College, Bristol In later life he sat on the college's council, 1948–1961 and New College, Oxford. (Note: Where he won the Ellerton Prize and gained a Cross Country Blue)

After university he took Holy Orders and embarked on a clerical career that was to last for over 40 years. He served in curacies in East Finchley and Chelsea until he was appointed, during the First World War, a Temporary Chaplain to the Forces in January, 1917. He was posted to East Africa, having indicated in his interview that he 'leans to a hot climate'. He arrived at Dar-Es-Salaam at the end of May, and was sent to Dodoma, about 300 miles inland. Haigh was already acquainted with the Senior Chaplain, Percy Guinness, who was the first chaplain to win a DSO in 1914 in France. At Dodoma, Haigh found that the main problems were caused not by the Germans but by disease and boredom. To alleviate the boredom, he created a grass hall lit by electricity for recreational purposes. When the Dodoma base closed, he was transferred to Dar-Es-Salaam where he was instrumental in building and equipping a second institute. He also lectured to troops on VD, where his 'plainness of speech won a sympathy and understanding which was remarkable'. Haigh, however, did not escape disease, and a second dose of Seven Day Fever led to his demobilisation. He would have lifelong problems with poor health, caused or worsened by his East Africa experiences. He had performed well enough in East Africa, however, to be twice mentioned in despatches.

From 1919 until 1924 he was Chaplain and Lecturer at the Ordination Test School, Knutsford, and Examining Chaplain to the Bishop of Llandaff but his big breakthrough came with his appointment to be the Archbishop of Canterbury's Private Secretary, a post he was to hold under two separate incumbents until his elevation to the rank of Bishop in 1931. (Note: Following a hugely successful role organising the 1930 Lambeth Conference) He was appointed Bishop of Coventry, and served the diocese well especially during the terrible bombing of the city during World War II. In 1942 he was translated to Bishop of Winchester, the enthronement taking place on 30 September that year. Haigh was, by 1942, highly regarded and was considered for the vacancies of Archbishop of Canterbury in 1942, when Cosmo Lang retired, and in 1944 following the sudden death of William Temple. However, Haigh, although he had a 'Fine Presence', was prone to depression, and this counted against him. The Prime Minister, Winston Churchill, was not keen to appoint Geoffrey Fisher in 1944 without seeing an alternative. Haigh lunched with Churchill on 22 December 1944, but on 2 January 1945, Fisher was appointed to Canterbury. Haigh, seems, therefore, to have been the 'runner-up' to Fisher. Fisher had been Bishop of London but would not recommend Haigh as his successor because, although Haigh was 'brilliant', he was too negative and unable to withstand the pressures of the post both physically and mentally.

A deep thinker and loyal monarchist, Haigh chaired the Joint Committee which revised the Amended Lectionary. He resigned his post in 1952 and was honoured by Winchester College before retiring to North Wales where he became involved in several rural campaigns. He died on 20 May 1962, his papers bequeathed to the nation.

William Wand, who succeeded Fisher as Bishop of London, regarded Haigh as 'a good man and a great prelate'. He reflected on Haigh's sharp mind and quick tongue which could demolish ill-thought through proposals and made Haigh the 'best machine-gunner on the bench' of bishops. Even though plagued by poor health, he was an exceptional bishop.

== Sources ==
- "Haigh, Rt Rev. Mervyn George". Who's Who & Who Was Who. Vol. 1920–2014 (April 2014 online ed.). A & C Black. (Subscription or UK public library membership required.)

Church of England titles
Preceded by Charles Lisle Carr	Bishop of Coventry; 1931–1942	Succeeded by Neville Gorton
Preceded by Cyril Garbett	Bishop of Winchester; 1942–1952	Succeeded by Alwyn Williams
