= Crag Farm Pit, Sudbourne =

Protected area in Suffolk, England

Coordinates: 52.116°N 1.545°E

- Site of Special Scientific Interest
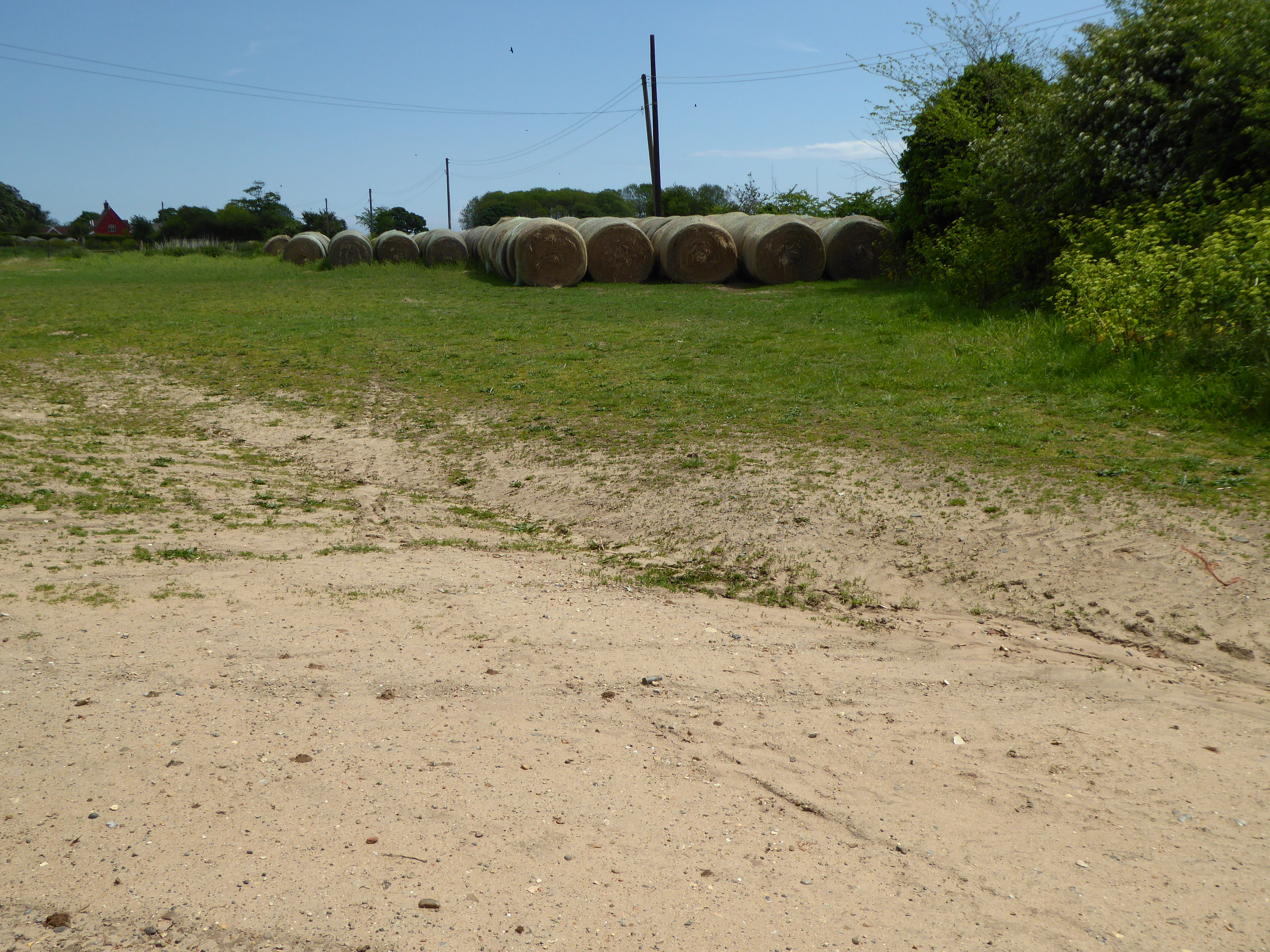
- Location of Crag Farm Pit, Sudbourne.
- Area of search: Suffolk
- Grid reference: TM 428 523
- Interest: Geological
- Area: 4.8 hectares
- Notification date: 1985
- Location map: Magic Map

Crag Farm Pit, Sudbourne is a 4.8-hectare (12-acre) geological Site of Special Scientific Interest east of Sudbourne in Suffolk. It is a Geological Conservation Review site, and within the Suffolk Coast and Heaths Area of Outstanding Natural Beauty.

This site dates to the early Pliocene, around four million years ago. It is described by Natural England as an important geological site, which has the best exposure of sandwave facies of the Coralline Crag Formation. Fossils of many bryozoan species are present.

The site has been filled in and is now a field. It is on private land with no public access.
