= John Taylor (bishop of Sodor and Man) =

Church of England bishop (1883–1961)

The Right Reverend John Taylor
- Bishop of Sodor and Man
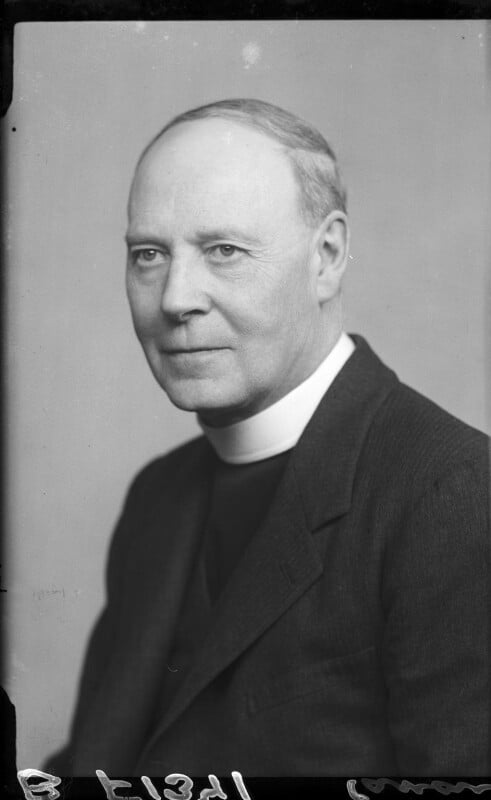
- Taylor in 1942
- Diocese: Diocese of Sodor and Man
- In office: 1942–1954
- Predecessor: William Stanton Jones
- Successor: Benjamin Pollard

Orders
- Ordination: 11 June 1911

Personal details
- Born: John Ralph Strickland Taylor; 13 December 1883
- Died: 13 December 1961 (aged 78)
- Denomination: Anglican
- Spouse: Margaret Barrett
- Children: 4, including John Vernon Taylor
- Education: Marlborough College
- Alma mater: Pembroke College, Cambridge

John Ralph Strickland Taylor (13 December 1883 – 13 December 1961) was Bishop of Sodor and Man from 1942 to 1954.

== Early life, family and education ==
Taylor was born on 13 December 1883 and educated at Marlborough and Pembroke College, Cambridge, and trained for the ministry at Ridley Hall, Cambridge. His father, John Charles, was also a priest who served as Vicar of Harmondsworth.

He served as president of the CICCU from 1905 t0 1906.

He married Margaret Garrett in 1913, and they had two sons and two daughters: one daughter, Leila Margaret, was born in 1920; and one son, John Vernon Taylor, was also a priest, later becoming Bishop of Winchester.

== Ordained ministry ==
Taylor was made a deacon on Trinity Sunday (22 May 1910) and ordained a priest the next Trinity Sunday (11 June 1911) — both times by Frederic Chase, Bishop of Ely, at Ely Cathedral. He was interviewed for a commission as a Temporary Chaplain to the Forces on 17 January 1917. It was noted that he could speak French but he asked to serve at "home only" and was appointed to the Royal Military Academy at Woolwich. In October, 1918, he was attached to an Essex Battalion based at Hastings but remained there for only two months before demobilisation and appointment to the headship of St Lawrence College, Ramsgate. Later he was Rector of Hodnet with Weston-under-Redcastle (1928–32; for the two years, he was also Rural Dean) then Principal of Wycliffe Hall, Oxford — a post he held until his appointment as a bishop. He was also, alongside his main appointments, an examining chaplain to Bertram Pollock, Bishop of Norwich (1911–42); Edward Burroughs and Geoffrey Lunt, Bishops of Ripon (1932–42); and John Kempthorne and Edward Woods, Bishops of Lichfield (1935–42); an honorary canon of Norwich Cathedral (1938–42); and president of the London College of Divinity from 1945 onwards.

Taylor was consecrated as a bishop at York Minster on the Feast of the Epiphany (6 January) 1943. His appointment to Sodor and Man was made partly on the recommendation of the Bishop of Worcester who thought that Taylor's experience at Ridley Hall would help the theological college on the island.[TNA PREM5/338]. Taylor retired in 1954 and died on 13 December 1961.

Religious titles
Preceded by William Stanton Jones	Bishop of Sodor and Man; 1942–1954	Succeeded by Benjamin Pollard
