= Oxford Mail =

Daily tabloid newspaper in Oxford, England

- Type: Daily newspaper
- Format: Tabloid
- Owner: USA Today Co.
- Publisher: Newsquest
- Editor: Andrew Colley
- Founded: 1928 (1753: predecessor "Jackson's Oxford Journal")
- Language: English
- Headquarters: Newspaper House, Osney Mead, Oxford
- Circulation: 3,748 (as of 2024)
- Website: oxfordmail.co.uk

The Oxford Mail is a daily tabloid newspaper in Oxford, England, currently owned by Newsquest and published six days a week. It is a sister paper to the weekly tabloid (former broadsheet) The Oxford Times.

== History ==
The Oxford Mail was founded in 1928 by MP Frank Gray as a successor to Jackson's Oxford Journal (1753 - 1928), named after William Jackson, a former printer of the University of Oxford. Originally an evening newspaper, the Oxford Mail is now published in the morning and online.

== Notable former staff ==
- Sir David Bell
- Mark Barrington-Ward
- Morley Safer
