= Henry Wilson (bishop) =

British Anglican bishop (1876–1961)

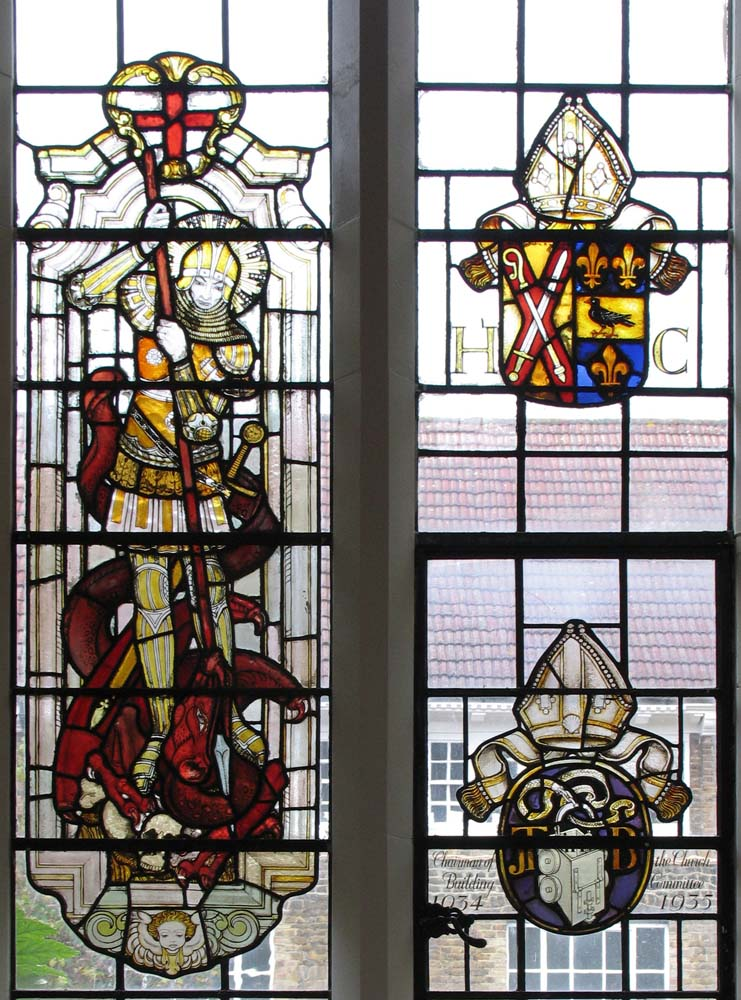
Arms of "Henry Chelmsford"

Henry Albert Wilson CBE (6 September 1876 – 16 July 1961) was an Anglican bishop and author.

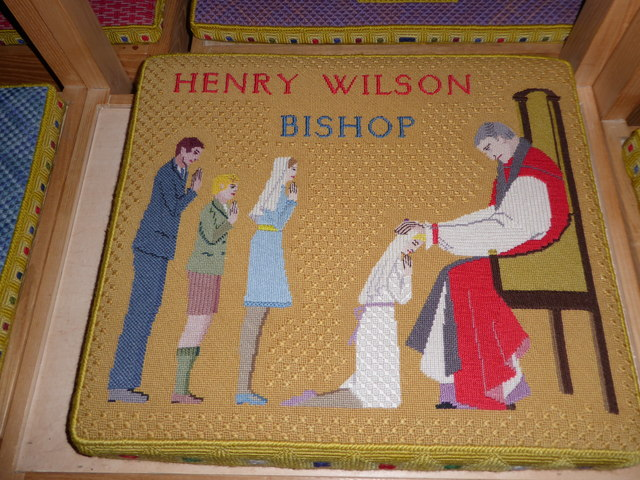
Wilson depicted on an embroidered cushion at Chelmsford Cathedral

== Biography ==
Born in Port Bannatyne, Wilson was educated at Camberwell Grammar School and Corpus Christi College, Cambridge.

Wilson was made a deacon in Advent 1899 (on St Thomas' Day, 21 December) by Mandell Creighton, Bishop of London, at Holy Trinity, Chelsea; and ordained a priest the next Advent (23 December 1900) by Alfred Barry, assistant bishop for West London, at St Paul's Cathedral. He began his career with a curacy at Christ Church, Hampstead, in London; after which he became Vicar of Norbiton. He was then Rural Dean of Cheltenham, until his appointment to the episcopate in 1929 as the third Bishop of Chelmsford.

He was consecrated a bishop on the Feast of the Conversion of St Paul, 25 January 1929, by Arthur Winnington-Ingram, Bishop of London, at Westminster Abbey. (He had recently taken his See by the confirmation of his election, after his predecessor had translated on 21 January, but before his own consecration on 25 January.) A proposal to expedite divorce – by having divorce cases heard in a magistrates' court rather than a higher court – prompted his strenuous objection in 1944: "the landslide in sexual morals" meant that Christianity was "hanging by a thread in this country today". He resigned effective 30 November 1950, and retired to Southwold. He had become a Doctor of Divinity (DD).

Wilson's son was the architect Colin St John Wilson.

== Works ==
- Episcopacy and Unity, 1912
- The Master and His Friends, 1925
- Your Faith or Your Life, 1940
- Reflections of a Back-Bench Bishop, 1948

Church of England titles
| Preceded by Guy Warman | Bishop of Chelmsford; 1929–1950 | Succeeded by Falkner Allison |
