= John Taylor (bishop of Winchester) =

English bishop and theologian

- Bishop of Winchester
- Diocese: Diocese of Winchester
- In office: 1975–1985
- Predecessor: Falkner Allison
- Successor: Colin James
- Other posts: General Secretary, CMS (1963–1974)

Personal details
- Born: 11 September 1914 Cambridge, Cambridgeshire, United Kingdom
- Died: 30 January 2001 (aged 86) Oxford, Oxfordshire, United Kingdom
- Denomination: Anglican
- Parents: John Taylor & Margaret Irene née Garrett
- Spouse: Peggy née Wright (m. 1940)
- Children: three
- Education: Trinity College, Cambridge

Ordination history
History
Diaconal ordination
- Ordained by: Arthur Winnington-Ingram
- Date: 18 December 1938
- Place: St Paul's Cathedral
Priestly ordination
- Ordained by: Vernon Smith
- Date: 29 September 1939
- Place: St Paul's Cathedral
Episcopal consecration
- Consecrated by: Donald Coggan
- Date: 31 January 1975
- Place: Westminster Abbey

John Vernon Taylor (11 September 1914 – 30 January 2001) was an English bishop and theologian who was the Bishop of Winchester from 1974 to 1985.

== Education and family ==
Taylor was born in Cambridge – while his father (John) was Vice Principal at Ridley Hall – and educated at St Lawrence College (where his father was headteacher). He read English at Trinity College, Cambridge, then read theology and trained for the ministry at St Catherine's Society and Wycliffe Hall (where his father was principal) at Oxford, and the Institute of Education.

His father was later Bishop of Sodor and Man; his mother was Margaret Irene née Garrett. Taylor married Margaret (Peggy) Wright on 5 October 1940, and they had three children.

== Priestly ministry ==
He was ordained in the Church of England: made a deacon by Arthur Winnington-Ingram, Bishop of London, at St Paul's Cathedral on 18 December 1938, and ordained priest by Vernon Smith, Bishop of Willesden, at St Paul's on Michaelmas (29 September) the following year. (Note: Who Was Who erroneously records that he was ordained deacon in 1956 and priest in 1957, whereas both Crockford's and the Church Times record 1938 and 1939, and these are consistent with his first curacy: 1938–1940.) He spent five years engaged in Christian ministry in England, (from 1938 to 1940 as a curate at All Souls, Langham Place, and then from 1940 to 1943 as curate in St Helen's the Diocese of Liverpool). He then felt drawn to overseas missionary work; unable to do so immediately because of wartime travel restrictions, he obtained a teaching qualification at London University.

In 1945, with the ending of World War II, he moved to Mukono, Uganda, as a missionary working in theological education. He returned to England in 1954 and worked for the International Missionary Council. In 1959 he became Africa Secretary of the Church Missionary Society, and in 1963 he succeeded Max Warren as its General Secretary, remaining in post until 1974.

== Episcopal ministry ==
His nomination to the See of Winchester was announced 14 August 1974, he was elected and confirmed that winter, consecrated a bishop by Donald Coggan, Archbishop of Canterbury, at Westminster Abbey on 31 January, and installed at Winchester Cathedral on 8 February 1975. He then served as Bishop of Winchester until his retirement on 28 February 1985, succeeding Falkner Allison, an old-fashioned Evangelical much-loved by all parties within the diocese. He was the first priest to be consecrated directly to the See of Winchester since William Day in 1595, and was respected throughout the diocese and beyond mainly by liberals and modernists, but failed to gain the trust of Anglo-Catholics. A product of Wycliffe Hall, with connections with All Souls, Langham Place, he was nevertheless a liberal evangelical rather than a conservative one. When first consecrated, he initially caused some amusement by refusing to wear a mitre and ordering that it be carried in front of him on a cushion in processions. After that one occasion he reverted to custom and wore it.

== Bibliography ==
The most notable of his books were The Go-Between God (1972) and The Christlike God (1992), both of which remain in print. Enough is enough (1975) was an early book of the environmentalist movement, making the theological case for resisting consumerism and looking after our planet.

- The Primal Vision: Christian Presence amid African Religion (London: SCM 1963; New Edition, SCM Classics 2001)
- The Go-Between God: The Holy Spirit and the Christian Mission (London: SCM 1972; New Edition, SCM Classics 2002).
- For All the World (1966)
- Enough is enough (London: SCM: 1975)
- The Growth of the Church in Buganda: An Attempt at Understanding (1980)
- Weep Not for Me: Meditations on the Cross and the Resurrection (1986)
- The Christlike God (London: SCM 1992).
- Bishops on the Bible: Eight Bishops on the Role and Relevance of the Bible Today (1994)
- A matter of life and death (London: SCM 1986)
- Kingdom Come (1989)
- A Christmas Sequence and Other Poems (1989)

Posthumous collections:

- The Easter God and his Easter People (2003)
- The Incarnate God (2006)

Biographical:

- Poet, Priest and Prophet by David Wood.

== Notes ==
Church of England titles
Preceded by Falkner Allison	Bishop of Winchester; 1975–1985	Succeeded by Colin James
