= Bishop of Coventry =

Diocesan bishop in the Church of England

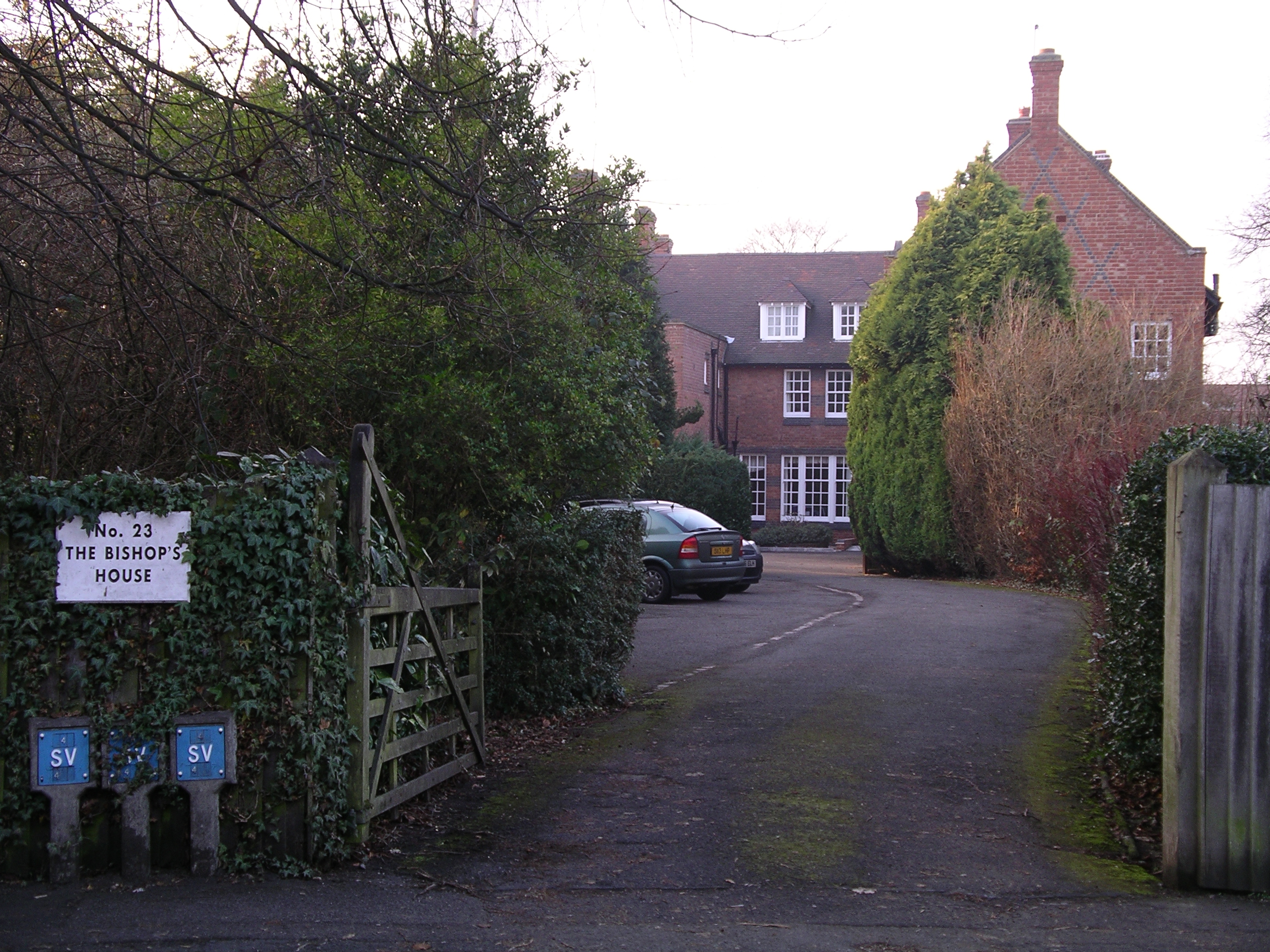
"The Bishop's House", Coventry.

The Bishop of Coventry is the ordinary of the Church of England Diocese of Coventry in the Province of Canterbury. In the Middle Ages, the Bishop of Coventry was a title used by the bishops known today as the Bishop of Lichfield.

The present diocese covers most of the County of Warwickshire. The see is in the City of Coventry where the bishop's seat is located at the Cathedral Church of Saint Michael. The Bishop's residence is Bishop's House, Coventry.

== History ==
From 1102 to 1238, the former Benedictine Priory and Cathedral of St Mary in the city was the seat of the early Bishops of Coventry (previously known as Bishops of Chester or of Lichfield). It was, afterwards, one of the two seats of the Bishop of Coventry and Lichfield until the Reformation of the 1530s when Coventry (St Mary's) Cathedral was demolished and the bishop's seat moved to Lichfield, though the title remained as Bishop of Lichfield and Coventry until 1837, when Coventry was united with the Diocese of Worcester.

== Bishops of the modern diocese ==
The diocese was revived in 1918 under King George V when the parish church of Saint Michael was elevated to cathedral status. The cathedral suffered under fire-bombing by the Luftwaffe on the night of 14 November 1940 and remains today as a dignified ruin adjacent to the new cathedral building consecrated on 25 May 1962. The 8th Bishop of Coventry was Colin Bennetts, who retired on 31 January 2008.

Christopher Cocksworth resigned as Bishop of Coventry effective 5 November 2023, to become Dean of Windsor. Because the suffragan See of Warwick is also vacant, so Ruth Worsley (Bishop of Taunton in the Diocese of Bath and Wells) has been seconded part-time as Acting Bishop of Coventry since 6 November.

On 4 November 2024, it was announced that Sophie Jelley, Bishop of Doncaster, had been appointed as the next Bishop of Coventry, to take up the position in spring 2025. She legally became Bishop by the confirmation of her election on 14 February 2025.

== List of bishops ==
Bishops of Coventry
From	Until	Incumbent	Notes
1918	1922	Huyshe Yeatman-Biggs	Translated from Worcester.
1922	1931	Charles Lisle Carr	Translated to Hereford.
1931	1943	Mervyn Haigh	Translated to Winchester.
1943	1955	Neville Gorton	
1956	1976	Cuthbert Bardsley	Translated from Croydon.
1976	1985	John Gibbs	Translated from Bradwell.
1985	1997	Simon Barrington-Ward	
1998	2008	Colin Bennetts	Translated from Buckingham.
2008	2023	Christopher Cocksworth	Resigned in November 2023 to become Dean of Windsor
2023	2024	Ruth Worsley, Acting Bishop	Also Bishop of Taunton; term to end 31 December 2024.
2025	2025	Tim Thornton, Acting Bishop	1 January 2025 until Jelley's arrival.
14 February 2025	present	Sophie Jelley	Translated from Doncaster, 14 February 2025.

== Assistant bishops ==
Among those who have served as assistant bishops of the diocese have been:

- 1937–1952: Richard Heywood, retired Bishop of Mombasa
- 1952–1959: Nathaniel Newnham Davis, Rector of Ladbroke and former Bishop of Antigua
- 1960–1980: John McKie, Rector of Berkswell (until 1966), Vicar of Great and Little Packington (from 1966) and former Bishop of Geelong
- 1968–1975 (ret.): John Daly, Priest-in-charge of Honington with Idlicote and Whatcote (until 1970), Vicar of Bishop's Tachbrook thereafter; former Bishop of Gambia and the Rio Pongas, of Accra, in Korea and of Taejon
- November 2023–present: Saju Muthalaly, Bishop of Loughborough, is also serving part-time as an Assistant Bishop supporting the Acting Bishop one day a week

== Bibliography ==
- Crockford's Clerical Directory (100th ed.). London: Church House Publishing. 2007. ISBN 978-0-7151-1030-0.
- Fryde, E. B.; Greenway, D. E.; Porter, S.; Roy, I., eds. (1986). Handbook of British Chronology (3rd, reprinted 2003 ed.). Cambridge: Cambridge University Press. ISBN 0-521-56350-X.
