= Robert Barrington-Ward =

English barrister and journalist

- Barrington-Ward in 1919
- Born: Robert McGowan Barrington-Ward; 23 February 1891; Worcestershire, England
- Died: 29 February 1948 (aged 57); Off Dar es Salaam, Zanzibar
- Other names: Robin, B.W.
- Education: Balliol College, Oxford
- Occupations: Barrister, journalist, and editor
- Spouse: Adele Radice (m. 1926–1948)
- Children: Mark Barrington-Ward; Simon Barrington-Ward; Caroline Barrington-Ward
- Relatives: Frederick Temple Barrington-Ward (brother); Sir Lancelot Barrington-Ward (brother)

Robert McGowan Barrington-Ward DSO MC (23 February 1891 – 29 February 1948) was an English barrister and journalist who was editor of The Times from 1941 until 1948.

== Family and early life ==
Robert was the fourth son of Mark James Barrington-Ward, the rector of Duloe, Cornwall and an inspector of schools. He attended Westminster School, where he was a King's Scholar, and Balliol College, Oxford. While at Balliol, he was elected president of the Oxford Union Society and took a Third Class in Greats in 1913. Though planning for a career in the law and in politics, he undertook freelance editing work for The Times while reading for the Bar, and in February 1914 was given a position as secretary to the editor, Geoffrey Dawson. At the start of World War I, Barrington-Ward became an officer with the Duke of Cornwall's Light Infantry (DCLI). He went on to serve in France and Belgium, where he was mentioned in despatches three times and awarded both the Distinguished Service Order and the Military Cross.

In the 1920s Barrington-Ward met and married Adele Radice, the daughter of an Indian civil servant who was working as a schoolteacher. The couple had two sons, Mark and Simon, and a daughter, Caroline. Mark followed his father by serving in the DCLI, studying at Balliol and editing a newspaper.

== Newspaper career ==
Postwar demobilisation left Barrington-Ward a man without a position. While he was called to the Bar at Lincoln's Inn a few weeks after the end of the war, early in 1919 he received an invitation to become an assistant editor of a Sunday newspaper The Observer. Though his initial interview with the paper's editor, J. L. Garvin, did not go well, a successful stint as a special correspondent to the Paris Peace Conference soon won Garvin over. The position provided Barrington-Ward with valuable experience in the management and operations of a newspaper, and he developed a close friendship with the legendary editor.

In April 1927 Dawson invited Barrington-Ward to return to The Times as assistant editor. Barrington-Ward accepted, taking over most of the day-to-day administration of the office. His responsibilities soon grew: in 1929, he began writing most of the leading articles on domestic policy and European matters, and in 1934 he was made deputy editor. Convinced by his own military service of the futility of the First World War, he supported Dawson's views in favour of appeasing Germany in the 1930s. In fact, he worked behind the scenes to promote his vision. Lester B. Pearson, then a young chargé d'affaires in the Canadian High Commission, recalls in his memoirs a visit paid by Barrington-Ward in furtherance of the appeasement policy which was fashionable in that era:

There now followed another Nazi violation of the Treaty of Versailles, the reoccupation of the Rhineland in March 1936. There were those who counselled firm action with France against this Nazi move; that German troops should be ordered out of the Rhineland under threat of war. I was one of the great majority in Britain and Canada who condemned such a threat as war-mongering. I agreed with the London Times as it thundered against strong anti-Nazi policy and emphasized the danger of precipitate action against a Germany which, however deplorable its regime, was trying merely to free itself from some of the worst shackles of an unjust treaty... I recall how at this time, in pursuit of the policy which became known later as "appeasement", Barrington-Ward, an editor of the Times and an old Balliol friend of Mr Massey, came over to Canada House to persuade the High Commissioner to suggest to Mr King that he send a message to Mr Baldwin warning him that Canada would not support any strong or rash action against the Nazis over the occupation of the Rhineland. I was present at this talk. The idea appealed to Mr Massey, as indeed it did to me, and the High Commissioner in fact sent a telegram to Mr King along these lines on 13 March [1936]....

He switched to opposing further German expansion after the Germans invaded the remainder of Czechoslovakia in March 1939.

Two months later Barrington-Ward was approached by the owner of The Times, John Jacob Astor, about succeeding Dawson as editor upon Dawson's retirement, which was anticipated by the end of the year. Though Barrington-Ward accepted, Dawson's departure was conditional on the continuance of peace, and the outbreak of war led him to postpone his retirement indefinitely. It was not until Astor pressed Dawson for a departure date in May 1941 that the editor finally agreed to leave the paper at the end of September 1941.

As an editor, Barrington-Ward was more interested in policy matters than in the business of running a newspaper. Though a Tory democrat in his youth, he became a Labour supporter after the First World War and adopted an editorial stance more left-wing than that of his predecessors. In terms of the war, Barrington-Ward believed that it was generally the patriotic duty of the paper to support the government, he reserved the right to oppose specific policies, such as the deployment of British troops to Greece in 1944. He enjoyed regular contact with many of the leading figures in the war effort, including the prime minister, Winston Churchill.

== Death ==
In early 1947, Barrington-Ward's colleagues noticed a decline in his work. Though he was given a long break, upon his return he shocked friends and colleagues with his worsening condition. That November, Astor advised him to take three months off. In January 1948 he travelled to South Africa; on the return voyage, he fell ill with malaria which his weakened body was unable to fight. Barrington-Ward died on board the ship MV Llangibby Castle, which was docked in the harbour of Dar es Salaam in Tanganyika. He was buried onshore.

== Sources ==
- Fleming, N. C. "The Press, Empire and Historical Time: The Times and Indian self-government, c. 1911–47." Media History 16.2 (2010): 183-198.
- McDonough, Frank. "The Times, Norman Ebbut and the Nazis, 1927-37." Journal of Contemporary History 27#3 (1992): 407-424.
- Martel, Gordon, ed. The Times and Appeasement: The Journals of A L Kennedy, 1932-1939 (2000).
- The Office of the Times. The History of The Times: The 150th Anniversary and Beyond 1912-1948 (2 vol. 1952), vol 2: 1912-1948, passim.
- Wrench, John Evelyn (1955). Geoffrey Dawson and our times. Hutchinson.
- McDonald, Iverach (1984). The History of The Times, Volume V, Struggles in War and Peace, 1939–1966. London: Times Books.
- McLachlan, Donald (1971). In the Chair: Barrington-Ward of The Times. London: Weidenfeld and Nicolson. ISBN 9780297003052.
- Pearson, Lester B. (1972). Mike: The Memoirs of the Rt. Hon. Lester B. Pearson. Vol. 1. University of Toronto Press.

Media offices
Preceded by Geoffrey Dawson	Editor of The Times; 1941–1948	Succeeded by William Francis Casey
