= Sudbourne =

Village in Suffolk, England

Coordinates: 52.122548°N 1.523751°E

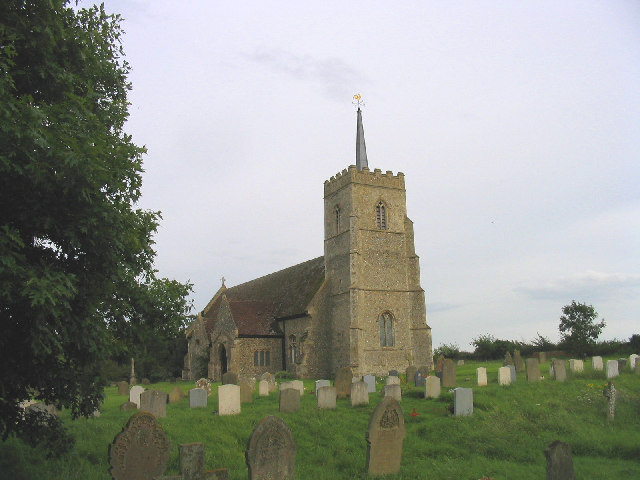
- All Saints' Church, Sudbourne

- Location within Suffolk
- Population: 309 (2011)
- District: East Suffolk
- Shire county: Suffolk
- Region: East
- Country: England
- Sovereign state: United Kingdom
- Post town: Woodbridge
- Postcode district: IP12
- UK Parliament: Suffolk Coastal

Sudbourne is a village and civil parish in Suffolk, England, located approximately 2 miles (3 km) north of Orford.

All Saints' Church dates from the 14th century but was much restored in 1879. It is a grade II* listed building.

Between 964 and 975 King Edgar and his wife Ælfthryth granted Bishop Æthelwold of Winchester an estate at Sudbourne on condition that he translated the Rule of Saint Benedict from Latin into Old English.

According to Sam Newton, Sudbourne was the location of the almost forgotten Battle of Newmouth between the English and the Danes in the early eleventh century.

During World War II Sudbourne and the neighbouring village of Iken were used as a battle training area in advance of the D-Day landings in June 1944. The inhabitants were relocated returning sometime after the war finished.

Sudbourne has Captain's Wood, a nature reserve owned by Suffolk Wildlife Trust, and Crag Farm Pit which is listed as a Site of Special Scientific Interest in Suffolk. Sudbourne is also the birthplace of Sir Thomas Rush.

== Sudbourne Hall ==
=== Stanhope ===
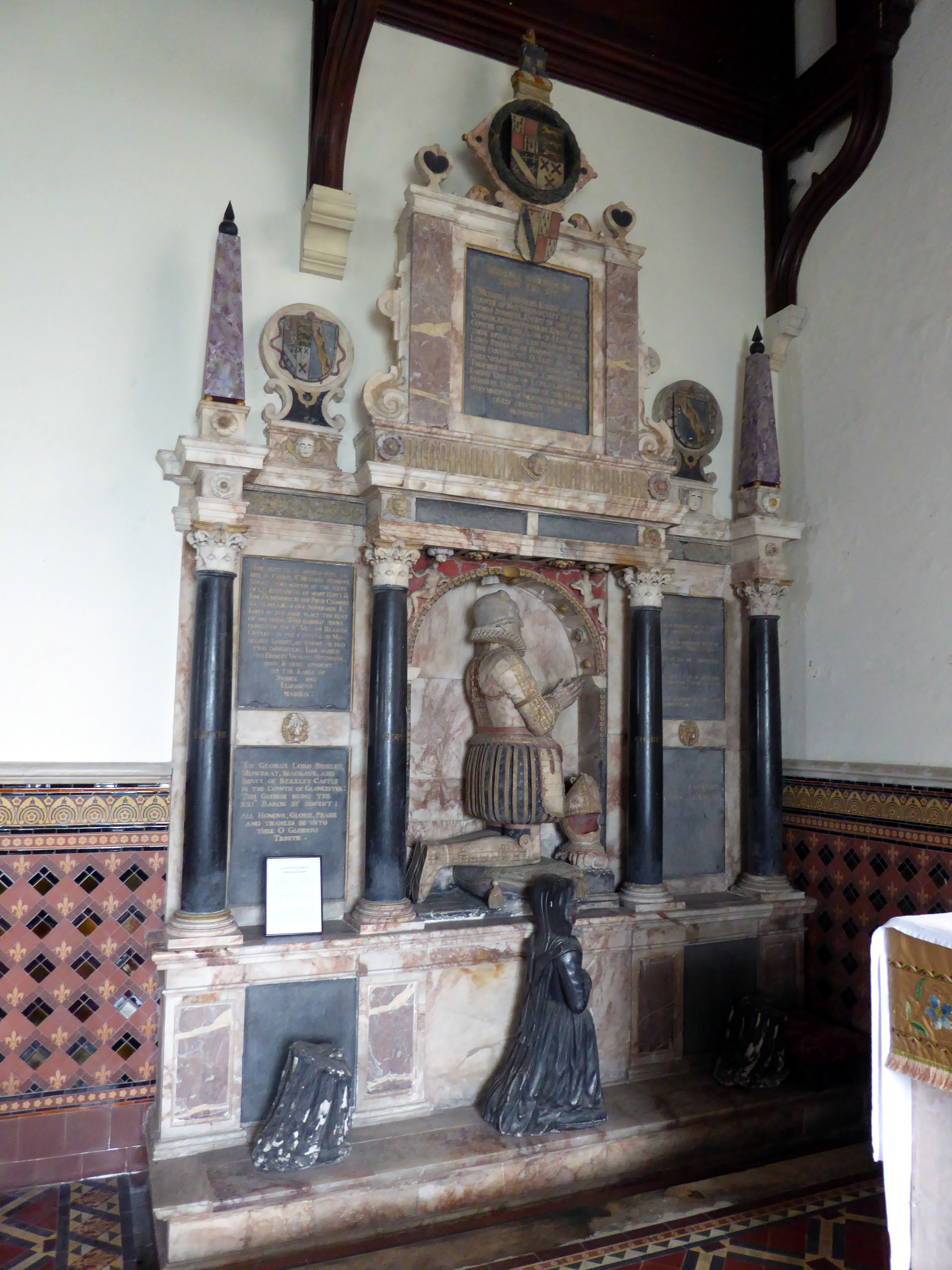
Monument and kneeling effigy of Sir Michael Stanhope, All Saints' Church Sudbourne

Sir Michael Stanhope (1549-1621), of Sudbourne, MP and a Groom of the Privy Chamber to Queen Elizabeth I purchased the manor of Sudbourne from the Crown, together with the manor house then known as "Chapmans", which later became Sudbourne Hall. He made improvements to the estate which increased its annual income by £200, including building a sea wall almost a mile long, at a cost of £1,500, and draining the coastal marshes which had made the air "very corrupt and contagious". He married Anne Read, the daughter and heiress of Sir William Read of Osterley in Middlesex, by whom he left four daughters and co-heiresses, including Jane Stanhope, whose share of the paternal inheritance was Sudbourne, who married Sir William Withypoole of Christchurch House in Ipswich Suffolk. Stanhope's monument with his kneeling effigy, erected during his lifetime as he mentioned in his will, survives in Sudbourne Church.

=== Devereux ===
Leicester Devereux, 6th Viscount Hereford (1617–1676) (whose funeral hatchment survives in All Saints' Church, Sudbourne) married as his first wife Elizabeth Withypoole, the daughter and heiress of Sir William Withypoole, by his wife Jane Stanhope, the heiress of Sudbourne, and thus Sudbourne passed into the ownership of the Devereux family. A further hatchment survives in the church to the 10th Viscount.

=== Seymour-Conway ===
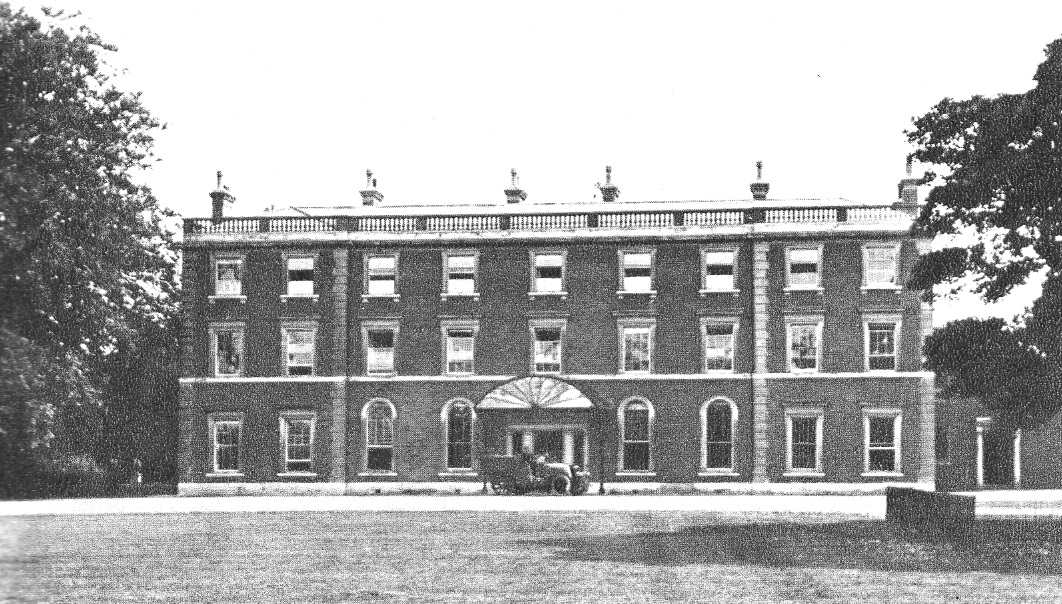
Sudbourne Hall photographed circa 1900, as built in 1784 by Francis Seymour-Conway, 1st Marquess of Hertford, to the design of the architect James Wyatt. Before the remodelling commissioned by the Clark family between 1904 and 1918

The Sudbourne estate was sold in 1753 by Edward Devereux, 11th Viscount Hereford to Francis Seymour-Conway, 1st Marquess of Hertford (1718–1794), who in 1784 commissioned the architect James Wyatt to re-built Sudbourne Hall, situated about one mile south-west of All Saints' Church, Sudbourne and about one mile south of the village of Sudbourne and one mile north-west of Orford Castle in the village of Orford. Under the Seymour-Conway family the estate comprised about 12,000 acres, and in 1840 included almost the whole of the parishes and villages of Orford, Sudbourne, Butley, Chillesford, Gedgrave and Iken. The funeral hatchments of the 2nd and 3rd Marquesses survive in Sudbourne Church. The later family resided mainly in Paris (where Richard Seymour-Conway, 4th Marquess of Hertford (1800-1870) was the British ambassador and where he built up a great art collection) and at their principal English country seat at Ragley Hall in Warwickshire. Whites Directory of 1855 stated of Sudbourne Hall: "It is used as a sporting residence, the park and neighbourhood abounding in game".

=== Wallace ===
When the 4th Marquess of Hertford died in 1870, without surviving legitimate issue, he appointed as his heir his illegitimate son Sir Richard Wallace, 1st Baronet (1818-1890). Thus Wallace inherited his father's art collection, then housed in Paris, but not the title, which passed by law to a male cousin, nor Sudbourne, which had been entailed to descend to the new 5th Marquess.

However, with his new fortune, in 1872 Wallace was able to buy Sudbourne from the 5th Marquess, for £298,000. After the Siege of Paris in 1870-1 Wallace removed his father's art collection for safe-keeping to London, where it survives on public display as the Wallace Collection in Hertford House, Manchester Square. He was a Francophile and a keen sportsman who created at Sudbourne a notable shooting estate (sometimes referred to as "the Holkham Hall of Suffolk") where the Prince of Wales was a guest in November 1879. He employed 24 liveried gamekeepers and "a small army of domestic servants" to cater for his shooting guests. He commissioned three large oil paintings by the French artist Alfred Charles Ferdinand Decaen, depicting his shooting parties (On Sudbourne Hill (1874); Shooting Luncheon at the Great Wood Sudbourne (1876); Battue de perdreaux dans la comté de Suffolk (1880)), now displayed in Orford Town Hall.

In 1878-9 Wallace restored Sudbourne Church at his own expense, and in 1884 sold the Sudbourne Estate to Arthur Heywood.

=== Heywood ===
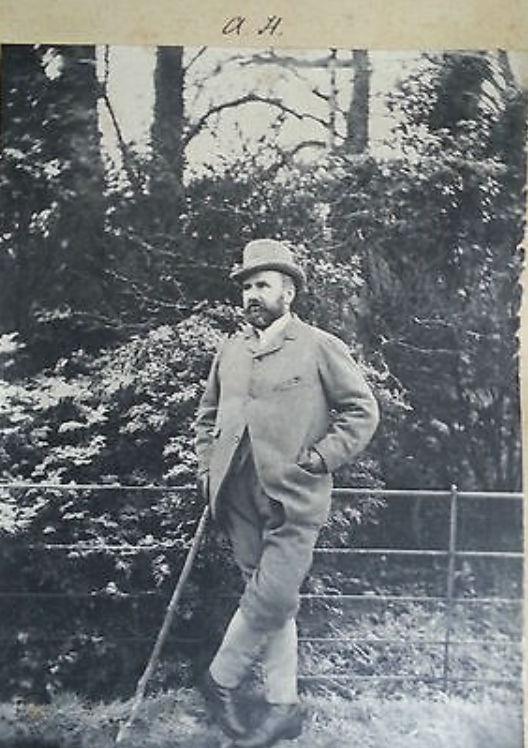
Arthur Heywood of Sudbourne Hall

Arthur Heywood (1834-1920), a son of Sir Benjamin Heywood, 1st Baronet (1793-1865), MP and banker, was born at Orsett in Essex and formerly resident at Mill Lane, West Derby, Lancashire. He was a banker in the family firm, being a partner in Heywood's Bank in Manchester and Liverpool, which in 1883 was sold to the Liverpool Bank for about £240,000, At West Derby in 1863 he married Frances Harriet Thompson (1838-1908) of Liverpool, by whom he had issue including the artist Eleanor Mary Heywood. Arthur Heywood founded the Sudbourne Cricket Club and in 1891 served as High Sheriff of Suffolk. In 1897 he sold Sudbourne to Arthur Herbert Edward Wood. To replace it he purchased another nearby famous shooting estate, Glevering Hall, near Wickham Market, in Suffolk, where he resided (with an indoor staff of seventeen) until his death in 1920, leaving an estate of over £350,000.

=== Wood ===
Arthur Herbert Edward Wood, of Raasay, Inverness, Scotland, was the brother of Heywood's future daughter-in-law Helen Grace Wood, the wife of Richard Heywood of Pentney House, Narborough, Norfolk. He was a keen shot and famous salmon fisherman, known as the "father of greased line fishing", who invented the floating line.

=== Clark ===
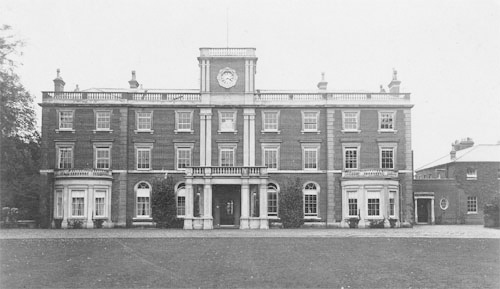
Sudbourne Hall as remodelled by Kenneth Mackenzie Clark between 1904 and 1918, to the design of Fryer

In 1904 Sudbourne was sold by Arthur Wood to Kenneth Mackenzie Clark (1868–1932), a wealthy Scottish industrialist whose fortune derived from cotton thread manufacturing conducted by the family firm of Clark & Co Ltd, of Paisley, established in 1755. It operated from Anchor Mills in Paisley and used an Anchor as its trademark. The invention of the sewing machine in 1846 increased the demand for the strong thread made by Clark & Co which was the first to sell thread wrapped onto a wooden spool. In 1864 an American branch was established, called the Clark Thread Co.

In 1896 J and P Coats, another cotton thread firm established in Paisley, acquired controlling interests in the firms of Clark and Co, Jonas Brook and Brothers and James Chadwick and Brother, and today the firm is represented by the multi-national conglomerate Coats Group.

Flush with money from the sale of his shareholding to J and P Coats, Kenneth Clark bought Sudbourne for the shooting, "which had replaced yachting as his chief occupation; he was an excellent shot and he was determined that his guests should have the opportunity of shooting more pheasants than anywhere else in Suffolk". His son Kenneth Clark, 1st Baron Clark (1903-1983), the art historian, was brought up at Sudbourne Hall until May 1918, when the estate was sold. Lord Clark discusses Sudbourne, somewhat dismissively, in his autobiography "Another Part Of The Wood" (1974):

It was one of Wyatt's typical East Anglian jobs, a large, square, brick box, with a frigid, neo-classical interior ... My parents wished to make it more comfortable and were advised to employ an architect named Fryer. When they returned they were surprised to find the main hall, galleries and staircase transformed into a pseudo-Jacobean style. Richly carved walnut covered every inch of the walls. There were pheasants, partridges, woodcocks, squirrels and spaniels, all in high relief. It was in very bad taste, but may well have been warmer and friendlier than Wyatt's neo-classicism.

Wood's library of books came with the house, and his bookplates were pasted over with the Clark bookplates.

He describes the park:

Four avenues, each a mile long, converged from different angles on the area in front of the house. One was lined with chestnuts, one with elms, and two with beeches. There had been a fifth, planted with elms by Lord Hertford, which attacked the house frontally, but it was overgrown and grandly mysterious ... In between two of the avenues was a nine-hole golf course ... In the other half of the park were two circles of beech trees which enclosed the stables of our Suffolk Punches.

As well as Sudbourne, Clark bought the 75,000 acre Ardnamurchan estate in Scotland, together with its two houses built by Charles Rudd, the main business associate of Cecil Rhodes, namely Glenborrodale Castle (used for deer stalking) and Sheilbridge (used for salmon fishing). The Clarks used Sheilbridge and let Glenborrodale to "a grim old Scottish financier named Fleming". He also built a house at Cap Martin in the South of France, where he kept a succession of large yachts, three of which were named "Katoomba", after the place he had visited in Australia.

Lord Clark's son the MP Alan Clark, wrote in his diary in 1996:

"On the way back from Aldeburgh we detoured to Sudbourne. The great house demolished but wonderful stablings and outbuildings still, although the glass canopies for resting the cars and carriages are gone, like the huge greenhouses, although the walled garden perimeter is still intact. What a huge property! All the cottage ornée are untouched - almost vulgar, but my goodness they were well built. We wandered about ... I posed for a photograph, got on some disintegrating stone steps with a large cedar growing nearby the whole garden now a wilderness and the lake grown over. When we returned I got out the albums - everything so spick and span. But a vast undertaking. My grandfather went there quite a lot; taking trout in May, pheasants in October and November. In between to Scotland - on the yacht - and sometimes just for a night on passage to 25 Berkeley Square. Yet Sudbourne could never really have been kept on - which Sheilbridge could. Though both estates so vast that without perpetual supervision you were going to get ripped off".

=== Boynton ===
In 1918 the greater part of the Sudbourne estate was sold by Clark to Walter Boynton, described by Lord Clark as "a speculator", who was mainly interested in the value of the timber and felled much of the woodland. The Clark family however remained in residence for a further two years before the sale was completed. Although in 1920 Boynton re-sold most of the estate, in 1929 he still retained a substantial landholding in the Iken section.

=== Watson ===
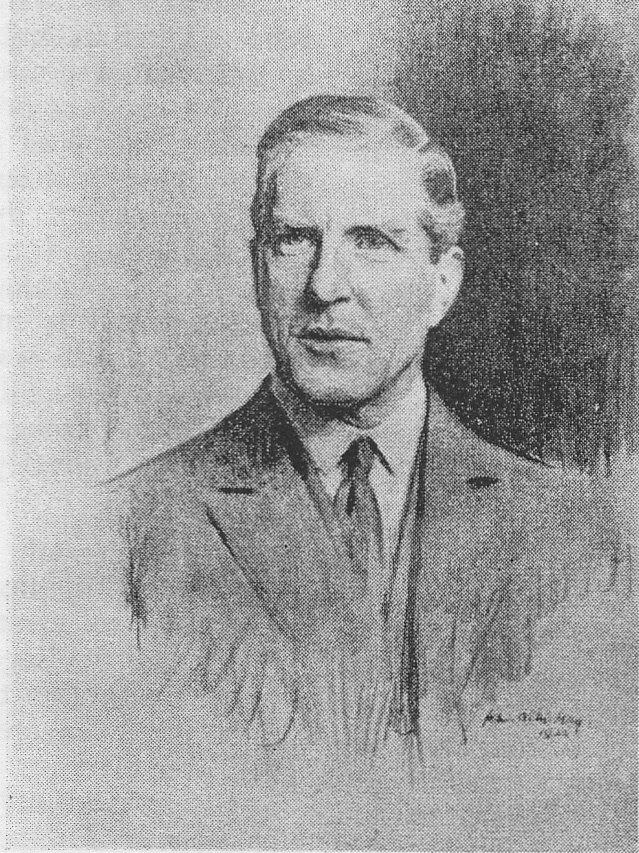
Joseph Watson, 1st Baron Manton. Portrait sketch by John A M Hay, 1923

The next buyer in 1920 was Joseph Watson, 1st Baron Manton (1873-1922) of Compton Verney in Warwickshire, a soap and munitions manufacturer from Leeds in Yorkshire, who had recently retired from business and was intent on devoting the rest of his life to sporting pursuits and research into industrialised agriculture. He acquired at about the same time five country estates totalling about 20,000 acres, of which Sudbourne accounted for about 9,000, including the palatial Robert Adam designed mansion of Compton Verney, which he intended to make his main residence, and the nearby Elizabethan mansion of Offchurch Bury. However, he died in a fox-hunting accident in Warwickshire, only four years later, in 1922, when 7,650 acres of the Sudbourne estate, together with Sudbourne Hall, were sold by his executors. "This sale signalled the complete breakup of the estate". Sudbourne Hall together with 196 acres of land and seventy-six acres of woodland was purchased by Malcolm Lyon.

However, of Watson's four sons, the third, Alastair Joseph Watson (1901–1955), inherited the remainder of Sudbourne, about 1,200 acres, centred on Chillesford Lodge, the model farm established by Sir Richard Wallace in 1875/6, situated half a mile west of Sudbourne Hall.

Alastair Watson continued for a while to maintain the famous and long-established "Sudbourne" prefixed herd of Red Poll cattle and the "Sudbourne" stud of Suffolk Punch heavy horses, which won several prizes.

In the 1930s part of the former Sudbourne estate was acquired by the Forestry Commission, including Chillesford Wood (from the Watsons) and Sudbourne Wood, and are today part of the Commission's 1,170 hectare Tunstall Forest, together with Gedgrave Broom, held on lease. The Watsons' estate was further reduced by two more sales of land, in 1927 and 1930.

In 1936 Alastair Watson built the Chillesford Polo Ground, a private club open to family and friends where teams played by invitation only. It represented "country polo at its best" and used an advanced system of irrigation sprinklers, then unique in England, imported by Watson from the USA where he had seen them in use at the Santa Barbara Polo Club in California. Spectators were encouraged and were admitted free of charge, with printed programmes with colour covers provided, a further innovation for a small polo club at the time. The club closed during World War II but re-opened in 1948. Alastair Watson is said to have been trampled to death by ponies during a polo match, after which the polo ground was ploughed up.

The Chillesford Lodge estate remains the property of George Watson, ex-Royal Navy who served on the Royal Yacht Britannia, one of the grandsons of Alastair Watson, who has converted the model farm buildings (some displaying Wallace's heraldic crest sculpted in stone) into multiple housing units.

=== Lyon ===
Following the death of Lord Manton in 1922, Sudbourne Hall together with 196 acres of land and seventy-six acres of woodland was purchased by (Jeremiah) Malcolm Lyon, of Jewish origin, who having been divorced by his first wife Maria Eliza Soper in 1913, had lived with his second wife during World War I and until 1920 at Heywood House near Westbury in Wiltshire which they operated as an "auxiliary hospital for wounded soldiers where they could rest, recover and recuperate from injuries and trauma". His sons included Malcolm Douglas Lyon, Chief Justice of the Seychelles from 1948 to 1957 and Beverley Hamilton Lyon, a co-founder of Rediffusion, both of whom were notable County Cricketers.

By 1929 Lyon had increased his landholding within the Sudbourne estate to 510 acres, comprising the Hall and 314 acres and 196 acres of the park and four cottages, including Rustic Lodge and White Lodge. In 1935 he was declared bankrupt, and was stated in the announcement in the London Gazette to be a company director, residing at "Tatchbury Manor House, Woodlands, near Southampton, Hampshire, lately residing at Sudbourne Hall, Orford, Suffolk".

=== Greenwell ===
Sudbourne Hall and the remainder of the estate (including the whole of Iken) was purchased in the 1930s by Sir Bernard Eyre Greenwell, 2nd Baronet (1874-1939), senior partner in his family's prominent stock-broking firm W. Greenwell & Co., of the City of London, founded by his father Sir Walpole Lloyd Greenwell, 1st Baronet (1847-1919), "of Marden Park in Godstone in the County of Surrey and Greenwell in Wolsingham in the County of Durham", who was a keen agriculturist and noted breeder of pedigree stock, particularly Shorthorn cattle and Shire horses. Further adjoining estates were purchased by the 2nd Baronet, including Gedgrave Hall, near Woodbridge, and the freehold of Butley Abbey, which however he allowed to remain the lifelong residence of the seller, Dr Montague Rendall (1862–1950), the former headmaster of Winchester College, who having purchased it in 1926 had "spent his last penny" in restoring the mediaeval gatehouse "with imagination and scholarly care". The 2nd Baronet resided at Butley Abbey Farm and at Marden Park and died in 1939. His heir was his son Sir Peter McClintock Greenwell, 3rd Baronet (1914–1978), who served as High Sheriff of Suffolk in 1966–67 and who in 1969 resided at Butley Abbey Farm.

During World War II the 3rd Baronet served in the army and in 1940 was captured at the Battle of Dunkirk when he became a prisoner-of-war, during which time the Sudbourne estate was run by an agent. In 1942 twelve square miles of the vicinity, comprising almost all the land to the north of Orford as far as the River Alde including the villages of Orford and Iken, and covering much of the former Sudbourne estate, were requisitioned by the War Department as the "Orford Battle Training Area" and was compulsorily evacuated for use in tank training exercises. The headquarters and officers' mess was at Sudbourne Hall, with other ranks living in tents in the park. One of the first units to be stationed there was a battalion of the Highland Light Infantry, and "on summer evenings when the skirl of the bagpipes could be heard approaching the village, a crowd would gather on the Market Square (Orford) and the pipe and drum band would entertain the villagers for maybe an hour marching and counter marching up and down the square and then with the skirl of the bagpipes fading into distance they returned to Sudbourne Hall".

The Orford Battle Training Area was later used by the 79th Armoured Division under Major-General Sir Percy Hobart, a "specialist armoured formation developed with the purpose of breaching the Atlantic Wall defences of occupied Europe and tasked with developing the machines and techniques that would be vital if the D-Day landings were to be successful". In the Orford Battle Training Area, which became known as "The Zoo", Hobart developed a range of modified vehicles known as "Hobart’s Funnies", which were intended to overcome obstacles such as minefields and heavily fortified defences, including concrete bunkers.

In 1946 the Earl of Cranbrooke spoke as follows in the House of Lords concerning residents evicted from Battle Training Areas:

Two days ago I heard a plea on behalf of these unfortunate men and women which I thought was rather effective. It came from a man who lives on the borders of the Orford area (indeed, he owns a considerable portion of it) and who was a prisoner for four years in Germany, having been captured in France. He said: "When we were prisoners in Germany, the one thing our thoughts turned to was our homes. Whether they were big homes or little homes, our one thought and hope was to get back to them. We all thought we should get back, but the cry that went up was: 'How long, how long?' It was the uncertainty that got us down, and it is exactly the same in the case of these poor men and women; they want to know when they are going back."

In 1948, when the War Department released the Orford Battle Training Area, Sudbourne Hall was in such poor condition that in 1953 it was demolished by the 3rd Baronet and the Italian gardens were abandoned.

In 2014 the Sudbourne estate, then comprising 530 acres, was owned by the latter's son Sir Edward Bernard Greenwell, 4th Baronet (born 1948), of nearby Gedgrave Hall, Woodbridge (an estate of 2,500 acres), and of Greenwell, Wolsingham, County Durham, the family's original ancient seat, High Sheriff of Suffolk in 2013–14. In 2014 he submitted plans to the local authority to build 10 houses within the old walled garden at Sudbourne, next to the surviving large stable block (previously converted to multiple housing units) and courtyard, the proceeds to be used "to plant new trees, to restore tree-lined driveways, repair an historic walled garden dating back to 1841, put back a Victorian fruit and vegetable garden, repair steps, create a broadwalk from terracing to a lake, and carry out other work". He continues to own Butley Abbey, let out as a wedding venue and as holiday accommodation, and the Gedgrave estate, "containing houses and workshops for rent, including the recent conversion of a Victorian dairy into a range of small, high-quality offices". In addition he owns Dalmigavie, an upland estate in Scotland.
