= Captain's Wood =

Nature reserve in Suffolk, England

Coordinates: 52.12°N 1.54°E

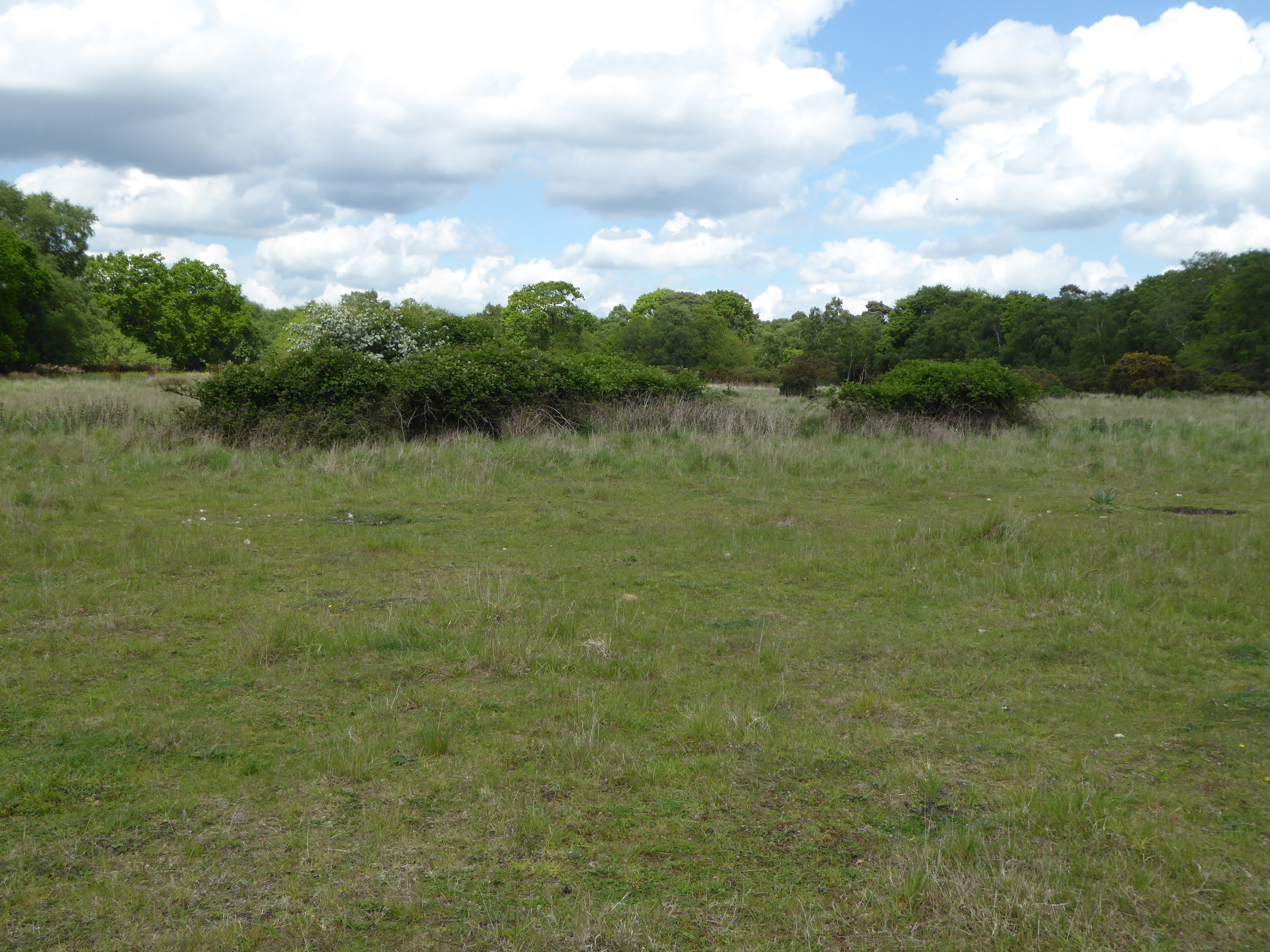
- Interactive map of Captain's Wood
- Type: Nature reserve
- Location: Sudbourne, Suffolk
- OS grid: TM421531
- Area: 62 hectares (150 acres)
- Manager: Suffolk Wildlife Trust

Captain's Wood is a 62 hectare nature reserve in Sudbourne in Suffolk. It is owned and managed by the Suffolk Wildlife Trust.

This site has woodland, rough grassland and scrub. A herd of fallow deer helps to keep the land open, and there are also barn owls, buzzards, mature oak trees and many bluebells.

There is access from School Road.
