= Colin James (bishop) =

English C of E bishop (1926–2009)

The Right Reverend Colin James
- Bishop of Winchester
- Diocese: Diocese of Winchester
- In office: June 1985 – April 1995
- Predecessor: John Taylor
- Successor: Michael Scott-Joynt
- Other posts: Bishop of Basingstoke (1973–1976/77); Bishop of Wakefield (1976/77–1985)

Orders
- Ordination: 1952 (deacon); 1953 (priest)
- Consecration: 1973

Personal details
- Born: 20 September 1926 Cambridge, Cambridgeshire, England
- Died: 10 December 2009 (aged 83) Winchester, Hampshire, England
- Denomination: Anglican
- Parents: Charles and Gwenyth
- Spouse: Sally Henshaw (m. 1962; died 2001)
- Children: 1 son, 2 daughters
- Profession: Television producer
- Education: Aldenham School
- Alma mater: King's College, Cambridge; Cuddesdon College

Colin Clement Walter James (20 September 1926 – 10 December 2009) was an Anglican bishop in the Church of England, successively suffragan Bishop of Basingstoke, then the Bishop of Winchester.

== Early life and education ==
James was born on 20 September 1926. His father, Canon Charles Clement Hancock James, was also a Church of England clergyman. He was educated at Aldenham School, a private school in Hertfordshire, England. He studied modern history at King's College, Cambridge, and then trained for ordination at Cuddesdon Theological College.

== Ordained ministry ==
James was ordained a deacon at Trinitytide 1952 and priest a year later, both by William Wand, Bishop of London, at St Paul's Cathedral. His ordained ministry which began with a curacy at St Dunstan's, Stepney between 1952 and 1955. After which he was a chaplain of Stowe School from 1955 to 1959.

In 1959, he joined the British Broadcasting Corporation (BBC) as a producer of religious programmes. He was Religious Broadcasting Organizer for BBC South West from 1960 to 1967. Then, his final appointment before being ordained to the episcopate, he was Vicar of St Peter's Church, Bournemouth from 1967 to 1973.

=== Episcopal ministry ===
James was the first suffragan Bishop of Basingstoke in the Diocese of Winchester, beginning with his consecration as a bishop on 2 February 1973 at St Paul's Cathedral by Michael Ramsey, Archbishop of Canterbury. He held his suffragan bishopric with a residentiary canonry of Winchester Cathedral.

He was translated to become diocesan Bishop of Wakefield and was enthroned at Wakefield Cathedral on 9 February 1977. He was returned to the Diocese of Winchester as the diocesan Bishop of Winchester; he was enthroned at Winchester Cathedral on 28 June 1985, having been elected two weeks prior and confirmed (officially becoming the Bishop) at some intervening point. He retired in April 1995.

He died on 10 December 2009.

=== Views ===
James was part of the Anglo-Catholic tradition of the Church of England, and was opposed to the ordination of women. He was not, however, a conservative in all matters, and supported the change to inclusive language in worship.

Church of England titles
| New title | Bishop of Basingstoke; 1973–1977 | Succeeded by Michael Manktelow |
| Preceded by Eric Treacy | Bishop of Wakefield; 1977–1985 | Succeeded by David Hope |
| Preceded by John Taylor | Bishop of Winchester; 1985–1995 | Succeeded by Michael Scott-Joynt |
