= Colin Bennetts =

British Anglican bishop

The Right Reverend Colin Bennetts
- Bishop of Coventry
- Diocese: Coventry
- In office: 1998–2008
- Predecessor: Simon Barrington-Ward
- Successor: Christopher Cocksworth
- Other posts: Bishop of Buckingham; 1994–1998

Orders
- Ordination: c. 1966
- Consecration: 29 April 1994

Personal details
- Born: 9 September 1940
- Died: 10 July 2013 (aged 72)
- Denomination: Anglican
- Parents: James Thomas Bennetts & Winifred Couldrey
- Education: Jesus College, Cambridge

Member of the House of Lords
- Lord Spiritual
- Bishop of Coventry; 9 July 2003 – 31 January 2008

Colin James Bennetts (9 September 1940 – 10 July 2013) was a British Anglican bishop. He was the 8th Bishop of Coventry from 1998 to 2008.

== Biography ==
=== Early life ===
The son of James Thomas Bennetts and Winifred Couldrey, he was educated at Battersea Grammar School, at Jesus College, Cambridge, where he graduated with a Bachelor of Arts in modern and medieval languages and theology and a Master of Arts in 1963, and at Ridley Hall, Cambridge.

=== Career ===
From 1965 to 1969, Bennetts was Curate of St Stephen, Tonbridge, from 1969 to 1973 Chaplain to the Oxford Pastorate, from 1973 to 1980 Chaplain of Jesus College, Oxford and from 1980 to 1990 Vicar and Canon Librarian of St Andrew, Oxford. In 1990, he became canon residentiary of Chester Cathedral and Diocesan Director of Ordinands, holding both posts until 1994. From 1994 to 1998 he was area Bishop of Buckingham in the Diocese of Oxford; he was consecrated a bishop on 29 April 1994 by George Carey, Archbishop of Canterbury, at St Paul's Cathedral. From 1998 to 2008 he was the 8th Bishop of Coventry. Bennetts was trustee of the Coventry Diocesan Board of Finance and chair of the International Centre for Reconciliation.
