= Christopher Cocksworth =

British Anglican bishop (born 1959)

The Right Reverend Dr Christopher Cocksworth
- Dean of Windsor
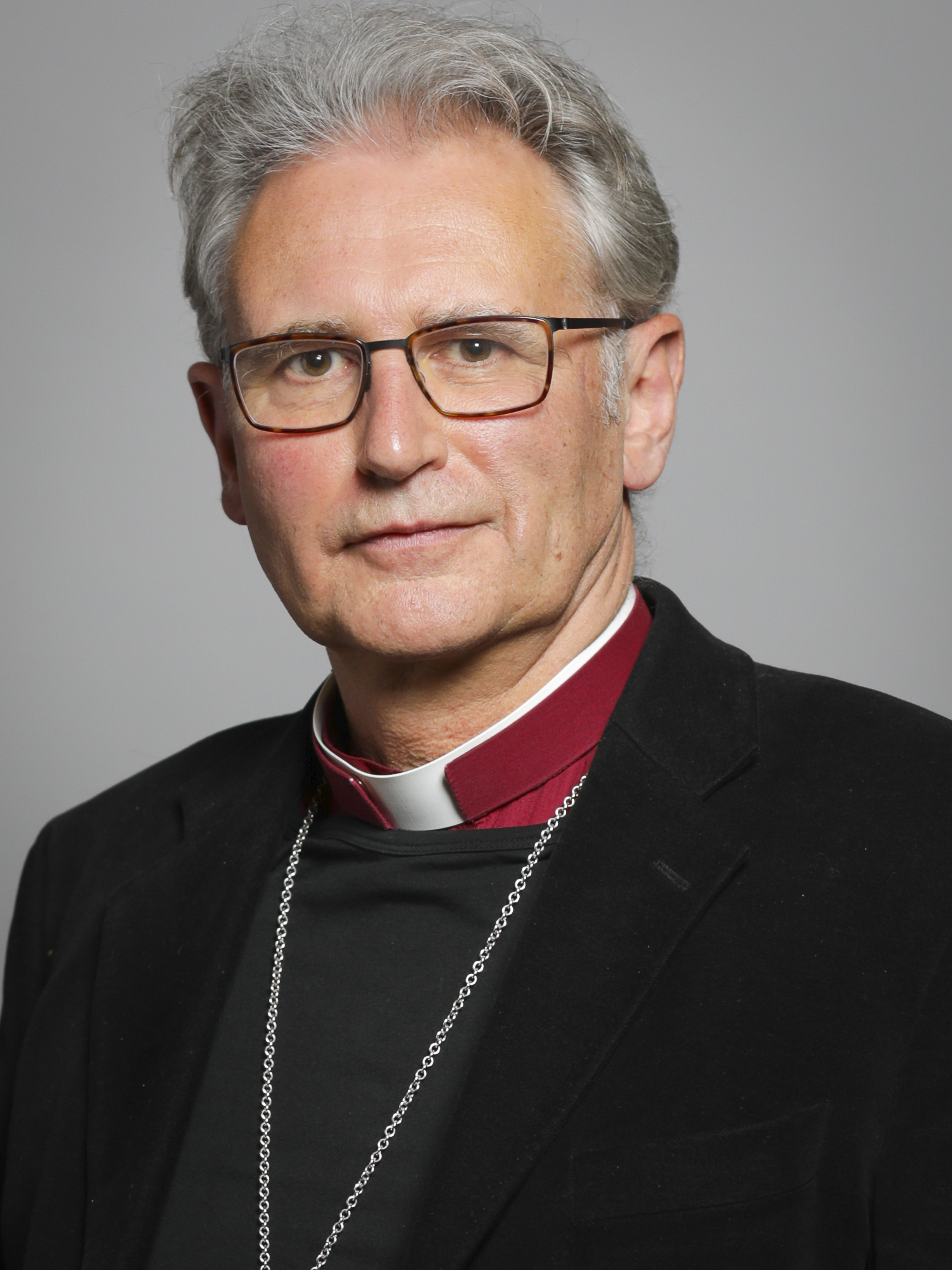
- Official portrait, 2019
- Church: Church of England
- In office: 6 November 2023 – present
- Predecessor: David Conner
- Other posts: Bishop of Coventry (2008–2023); Principal of Ridley Hall, Cambridge (2001–2008); Chaplain to Royal Holloway, University of London (1992–1997)

Orders
- Ordination: 3 July 1988 (deacon) by Michael Adie; 2 July 1989 (priest) by David Wilcox
- Consecration: 3 July 2008 by Rowan Williams

Personal details
- Born: 12 January 1959 (age 67)
- Spouse: Charlotte Pytches
- Children: Five sons
- Profession: Bishop, theologian
- Education: University of Manchester

Member of the House of Lords
- Lord Spiritual
- Bishop of Coventry; 15 January 2013 – 6 November 2023

Christopher John Cocksworth (born 12 January 1959) is a Church of England bishop in the open evangelical tradition who served as Bishop of Coventry from 2008 to 2023. Prior to becoming bishop, he was a university chaplain and the Principal of Ridley Hall, Cambridge (2001−2008). He took up the position of Dean of Windsor in 2023.

== Early life and education ==
Cocksworth was brought up in Horsham and attended Forest School for Boys and Collyer's Sixth form College, then the University of Manchester where he earned a Bachelor of Arts degree in theology with first class honours. In 1989 he was awarded a Doctor of Philosophy (PhD) degree under the supervision of Richard Bauckham. He studied for ordination at St John's College, Nottingham.

== Ordained ministry ==
Cocksworth was ordained a deacon at Petertide 1988 (3 July) by Michael Adie, Bishop of Guildford, and ordained a priest the following Petertide (2 July 1989) by David Wilcox, Bishop of Dorking – both times at Guildford Cathedral. He served his curacy at Christ Church, Epsom Common in the Diocese of Guildford. In 1992, he moved to become chaplain of Royal Holloway, University of London until 1997. He then became director of the Southern Theological Education and Training Scheme; a position he relinquished in 2001. He had been made an honorary canon of Guildford Cathedral in 1999. He was later the principal of Ridley Hall, Cambridge.

He was a member of the Church of England Liturgical Commission from 1999 to 2006, and was involved in revising the ordination services and the daily prayer compilation Common Worship. He later chaired the Faith and Order Commission.

=== Episcopal ministry ===
His nomination for the appointment as Bishop of Coventry on the retirement of Colin Bennetts was announced on 3 March 2008. He was formally elected by the cathedral chapter in May 2008, following the issue of a congé d'elire by Elizabeth II on 6 May 2008. He was consecrated as a bishop on 3 July 2008 in Southwark Cathedral by Rowan Williams, Archbishop of Canterbury; and was enthroned on 1 November 2008. He was the youngest serving diocesan bishop at the time of his appointment, and retained that distinction until late 2014. He became a member of the House of Lords as a Lord Spiritual on 19 November 2012.

He became the Church of England's lead bishop for higher and Further Education in 2021.

In June 2023, Cocksworth was appointed Dean of Windsor, the head of St George's Chapel, a royal peculiar in the precincts of Windsor Castle, He took up the appointment on 6 November, resigning the see of Coventry on the previous day.

=== Views ===
Cocksworth is against the extending of marriage to same-sex couples, and supports the Church of England current definition of Holy Matrimony (i.e. the life long union of one man and one woman).

In 2023, following the news that the House of Bishops of the Church of England was to introduce proposals for blessing same-sex relationships, he signed an open letter which stated:

many Christians in the Church of England and the Anglican Communion, together with Christians from across the churches of world Christianity, continue to believe that marriage is given by God for the union of a man and woman and that it cannot be extended to those who are of the same sex. [...] Without seeking to diminish the value of many committed same-sex relationships, for which there is much to give thanks, we find ourselves constrained by what we sincerely believe the Scriptures teach which cannot be set aside.

During the Church of England's February 2023 General Synod meeting, Cocksworth was one of two bishops in the house to abstain in the successful vote to introduce blessings and prayers for same-sex relationships.

== Personal life ==
He is married to Charlotte, daughter of David Pytches (former diocesan Bishop of Chile, Bolivia & Peru), and they have five sons.

== Honours ==
On 15 July 2009, Cocksworth was awarded the degree of Doctor of Divinity, honoris causa, of the University of London. The award was conferred by Royal Holloway, University of London, at a ceremony held in the college's chapel. The University of London awards honorary degrees to those of conspicuous merit, outstanding in their field, or those who have given exceptional service to the university. Cocksworth was honoured for his services to education – particularly higher education – and to the church as well as for his service to Royal Holloway.

In 2021 he received the Commander's Cross of Merit of the Federal Republic of Germany.

== Publications ==
Cocksworth has written widely on theological matters, with some of his books including:

- Renewing Daily Prayer: An Introduction to Celebrating Common Prayer (1992)
- Evangelical Eucharistic Thought in the Church of England (1993)
- An Anglican Companion, with Alan Wilkinson (1996)
- Holy, Holy, Holy, Worshipping the Trinitarian God (1997)
- Prayer and the Departed (1997)
- Common Worship: An Introduction (2001)
- Wisdom: The Spirit's Gift (2003)
- Being a Priest Today: Exploring Priestly Identity, with Rosalind Brown (2002, 2nd ed. 2006)
- Holding Together: Gospel, Church and Spirit (2008), which was nominated for the 2011 Michael Ramsey Book Prize.

Church of England titles
Preceded by Colin Bennetts	Bishop of Coventry; 2008–2023	Vacant
Preceded by David Conner	Dean of Windsor; 2023–present	Incumbent
