= Montague Rendall =

Montague John Rendall (6 May 1862 – 5 October 1952) was an English classical scholar and schoolmaster, head of Winchester College from 1911 to 1928.

In retirement, he was a Governor of the BBC and was busy in many other organizations.

== Early life ==
Born in Great Rollright, Oxfordshire, the fourth son of the Rev. Henry Rendall, Rector of the village, Rendall was educated at Elstree, Harrow School, and Trinity College, Cambridge, where he was a Foundation Scholar and was also Bell University Scholar in 1882. He was placed in the First Division of the First Class in the Classical Tripos of 1884 (Part I) and again in 1885 (Part II), and while at Cambridge in 1884 and 1885 played soccer in the first Eleven of the Cambridge University A.F.C.; he also went on to play for the Corinthians.

== Career ==
Rendall was appointed as an Assistant Master at Winchester College in 1887 and remained there for 37 years. In 1899, he was appointed as Second Master and then in 1911 as Headmaster, retiring at the end of the summer term of 1924.

A devotee of Italian painting and sculpture, Rendall inspired his pupil Kenneth Clark to appreciate the work of Giotto, Botticelli, Bellini, and others.

The Winchester College War Cloister was a project of Rendall's to commemorate the 500 Wykehamists killed in the First World War.

In his early retirement, from 1924 to 1926, Rendall made tours of the British Empire for the Rhodes Trustees.

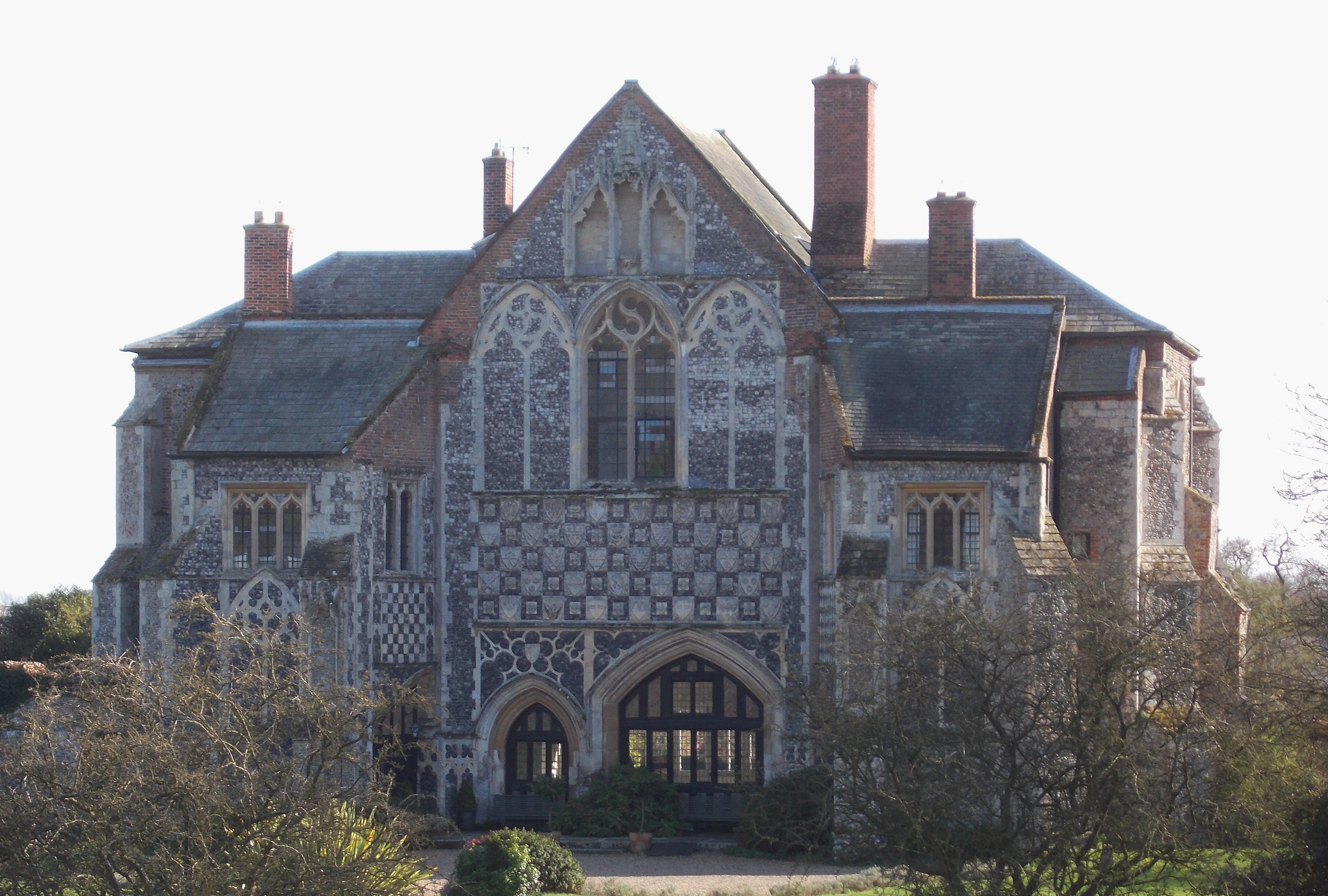
Butley Abbey Gatehouse

In 1926, Rendall bought the freehold of the mediaeval gatehouse of Butley Abbey, Sudbourne, Suffolk, and lived there for the rest of his life, spending "his last penny" on restoring it "with imagination and scholarly care".

In October 1926, Rendall was named as one of the five members of the newly constituted Board of Governors of the BBC, with the Earl of Clarendon, Lord Gainford, Sir Gordon Nairne, and Mrs Philip Snowden. It was later reported that Clarendon was a Conservative, Gainford a Liberal, and Snowden a Labour supporter, while "Sir Gordon Nairne and Dr. Montague Rendall take no interest in any particular Party." In 1927, at the suggestion of Rendall, the BBC chose for itself the motto "Nation shall speak peace unto nation", inspired by a verse from the Book of Isaiah, "They shall beat their swords into ploughshares". Rendall was vice-chairman of the BBC from 1927 to 1933, when he retired. At the end of 1931, it was reported that as a governor of the BBC Rendall was paid £700 a year, equivalent to £39,456 in 2023.

Rendall was vice-president of the Over-Seas League, the Royal Empire Society, and Framlingham College; Chairman of the League of Empire, the Public Schools Empire Tours Committee, and North Foreland Lodge; a Member of the Education Committee of East Suffolk County Council; and a Trustee of the Boyton Almshouses.

== Private life ==
In 1921, while a single man living in the Headmaster's House at Winchester College, Rendall had living with him a butler, a housekeeper, and five other indoor servants.

He was a member of the Athenæum Club, the Royal Empire Society, and the English-Speaking Union. He stated his recreations as walking and cycling. He died unmarried.

== Honours ==
- Companion of the Order of St Michael and St George, 1931 New Year Honours
- Officer of the Order of Saint John of Jerusalem, 1938 New Year Honours

== Selected publications ==
- Schools of Hellas: An Essay on the Practice and Theory of Ancient Greek Education from 600 to 300 B.C. by Kenneth John Freeman, ed. Montague John Rendall (London: Macmillan & Co., 1907)
- Sinai in Spring, or, The Best Desert in the World (London: Dent & Sons, 1911)
- The Bells of Great Rollright (Winchester: Warren and Son, 1947)

== Notes ==
Academic offices
| Preceded by Hubert Murray Burge | Headmaster of Winchester College; 1911–1924 | Succeeded by Alwyn Williams |
