= Simon Barrington-Ward =

English Anglican bishop (1930–2020)

The Right Reverend Simon Barrington-Ward KCMG
- Bishop of Coventry
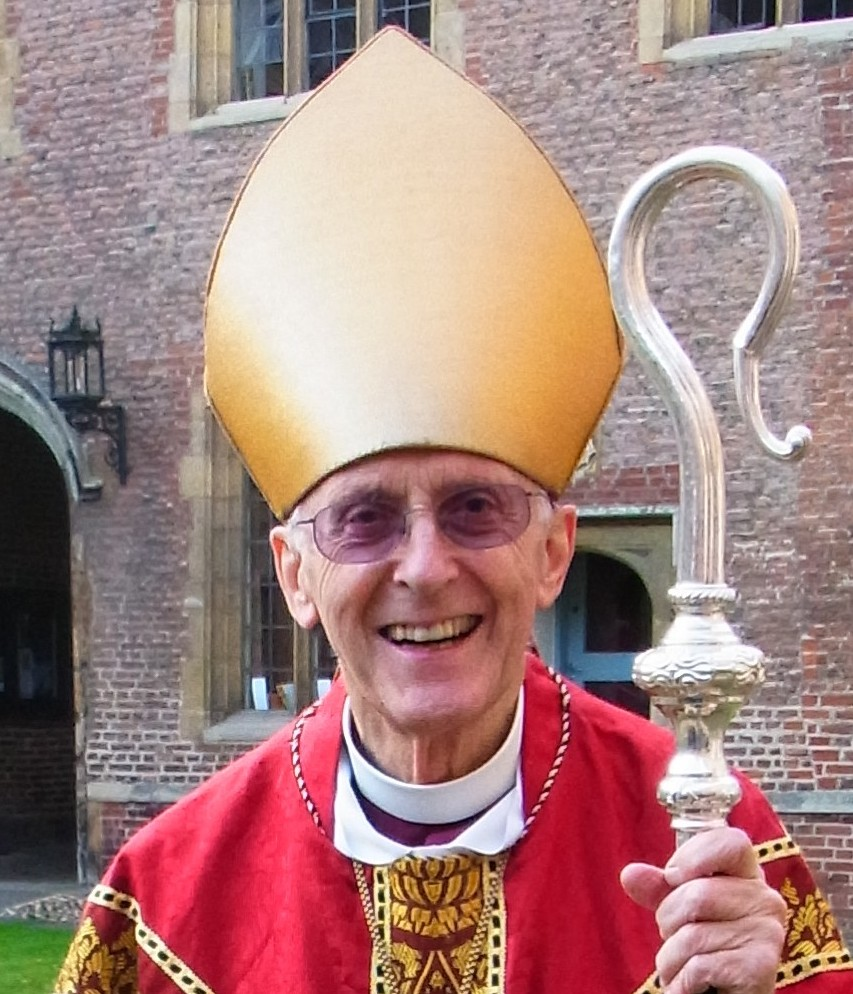
- Barrington-Ward at Magdalene College, Cambridge, October 2011
- Diocese: Diocese of Coventry
- In office: 1985–1997
- Predecessor: John Gibbs
- Successor: Colin Bennetts
- Other posts: honorary assistant bishop in Ely; 1997–2020

Orders
- Consecration: 1985

Personal details
- Born: 27 May 1930
- Died: 11 April 2020 (aged 89)
- Denomination: Anglican
- Parents: Robert Barrington-Ward & Margaret Adele Barrington-Ward
- Spouse: Jean Caverhill Taylor (m. 1963)
- Profession: RAF officer; theologian
- Education: Magdalene College, Cambridge

Simon Barrington-Ward KCMG (27 May 1930 – 11 April 2020) was a bishop in the Church of England.

Barrington-Ward was the son of Robert Barrington-Ward, who served as editor of The Times, and Margaret Adele Barrington-Ward. He was educated at Eton College and Magdalene College, Cambridge, from which he graduated Bachelor of Arts (BA) and Cambridge Master of Arts (MA Cantab.). After service as a Pilot Officer in the Royal Air Force, he taught at theological colleges before being ordained: he was made a deacon at Michaelmas 1956 (30 September), by Gordon Walsh, Assistant Bishop of Ely, at Ely Cathedral and ordained priest the following year.

He was the General Secretary of the Church Missionary Society (CMS) from 1975 to 1985. From 1985 to 1997, he served as the seventh Bishop of Coventry. He was consecrated a bishop by Robert Runcie, Archbishop of Canterbury, on All Saints' Day 1985 (1 November) at Westminster Abbey.

Barrington-Ward was later a bishop with pastoral care at the University of Cambridge, an honorary assistant bishop in the Diocese of Ely, honorary assistant chaplain of Magdalene College where he had been an honorary fellow since 1987, and a chaplain to the staff of Ridley Hall, Cambridge.

Barrington-Ward served as a Lords Spiritual in the House of Lords from 1991 till his retirement in 1997.

In the New Year Honours 2001, he was appointed a Knight Commander of the Most Distinguished Order of St Michael and St George (KCMG), having served as the Prelate of that Order. Following the custom for clergy in the Church of England, he did not use the title of "Sir".

He died from COVID-19 in April 2020, at the age of 89.

== Biography ==
- Exchange of Gifts: The Vision of Simon Barrington-Ward, edited by Graham Kings & Ian Randall, Ekklesia Publishing, 2023, ISBN 978-1-7397551-0-2

Religious titles
Preceded by John Gibbs	Bishop of Coventry; 1985–1997	Succeeded by Colin Bennetts
