= Oxford Civic Society =

Civic society

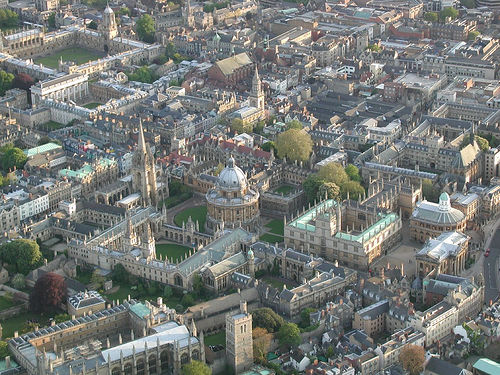
Aerial view of Oxford city centre

The Oxford Civic Society is a civic society that was founded in 1969 to oppose plans to build inner relief roads in Oxford, England.

The Society comments on all aspects of urban planning and is a founder member of the Oxfordshire Blue Plaques Board. It organises an annual OxClean Spring Clean weekend that collects several tonnes of litter throughout Oxford and recycles as much of it as possible.

Oxford Civic Society is a registered charity under English law.

== See also ==
- Oxford Preservation Trust
