= Who Was Who =

British biographical dictionary

Who Was Who is a book that is companion to A & C Black's Who's Who.

When the subject of a Who's Who entry dies, the biography is transferred to the next volume of Who Was Who, where it is usually printed as it appeared in its last Who's Who, with the date of death added.

The first volume of Who Was Who covered deaths between 1897 and 1915. They were then published at 10-year intervals, and since 1990 at five-year intervals.

Who Was Who series:

1. 1897–1915, 1988 reprint: ISBN 0-7136-2670-4
2. 1916–1928, 1992 reprint: ISBN 0-7136-3143-0
3. 1929–1940, 1967 reprint: ISBN 0-7136-0171-X
4. 1941–1950, 1980 reprint: ISBN 0-7136-2131-1
5. 1951–1960, 1984 reprint: ISBN 0-7136-2598-8
6. 1961–1970, 1979 reprint: ISBN 0-7136-2008-0
7. 1971–1980, 1989 reprint: ISBN 0-7136-3227-5
8. 1981–1990: 1991 ISBN 0-7136-3336-0
9. 1991–1995: 1996 ISBN 0-7136-4496-6
10. 1996–2000: 2001 ISBN 0-7136-5439-2
11. 2001–2005: 2006 ISBN 0-7136-7601-9
12. 2006–2010: 2011 ISBN 9781408146583
13. 2011–2015: 2016 ISBN 9781472924322

Corrections

Errors contained in Who's Who entries are corrected in Who Was Who (the deceased subjects cannot object to corrections because they are deceased).

== Volumes ==
=== Volume 1: 1897 to 1916 (later 1915) ===
The first edition was published in 1920 under the title Who Was Who: A Companion to "Who's Who" containing the Biographies of those who died during the period 1897-1916. The second edition, with addenda and corrigenda, was published in 1929. The third edition, with revised corrigenda, was published in 1935. The fourth edition, with revised addenda and corrigenda, was published in 1953. The title of this edition was Who Was Who 1897-1915. The fifth revised edition was published in 1966, and the sixth edition in 1988.

In a review of the first edition of this volume, The Spectator wrote "This book fills the gap between the standard biographical dictionaries and the current Who's Who. It contains the notices, reprinted from former volumes of Who's Who, of those more or less well-known persons who died between 1897 and 1916, with the dates of their deaths. It runs to nearly eight hundred pages of small type. As a work of reference it will be found exceedingly useful, all the more because many of the persons named will never figure in the Dictionary of National Biography".

This volume was also reviewed in The Sketch, The New World, The Expository Times The Illustrated London News, The Sphere, Country Life, The Athenaeum and The Publishers' Circular.

=== Volume 2: 1916-1928 ===
The first edition was published in 1929, the second in 1947, and the third in 1962. The fourth revised edition was published in 1967.

=== Volume 3: 1929-1940 ===
The first edition was published in 1941. The second revised edition was published in 1967. This volume was reviewed in The Spectator and Subscription Books Bulletin.

=== Volume 4: 1941-1950 ===
This volume was published in 1952. This volume was reviewed in The Spectator.

=== Volume 5: 1951-1960 ===
This volume was reviewed in British Book News.

=== Volume 6: 1961-1970 ===
This volume was published in 1972. This volume was reviewed in The Times Literary Supplement.

=== Volume 7: 1971 to 1980 ===
This volume was reviewed in The Times Literary Supplement.

== Cumulated index ==
There is a cumulative index, titled "cumulated index":

- Who Was Who, A Cumulated Index 1897 to 1980. Published 1981.
- Who Was Who: A Cumulated Index 1897–1990. Published 1991.
- Who Was Who: A Cumulated Index 1897—2000. Published 2002.

=== Cumulated Index 1897 to 1980 ===
This volume was reviewed in Books and Bookmen, The Times and The Times Literary Supplement. Cox said this index is useful.
