= Timothy Yates =

The Reverend Canon Tim Yates
- Born: 1 May 1935
- Died: 16 January 2016 (aged 80)
- Relatives: Lane-Fox family

Academic work
- Discipline: Theology
- Sub-discipline: Missiology
- Institutions: Cranmer Hall, Durham

Timothy Yates (1 May 1935 – 16 January 2016) was a British canon, theological educator, missiologist and historian.

Yates was the Warden of Cranmer Hall, the Anglican theological college that forms part of St John's College, Durham, from 1971 to 1979. Under his headship, the college first admitted women in 1973. In 1979, he wrote the first history of the college in celebration of its 70th anniversary. From 2008 until his death, he was a member of the college's Development Board, fundraising and consulting on a proposed Learning Resource Centre.

Yates died on 16 January 2016, at the age of 80.

== Career ==
- 1960-63 - Curate of Tonbridge (Diocese of Rochester)
- 1963-71 - Tutor at St John's College, Durham
- 1971-79 - Warden of Cranmer Hall, St John's College, Durham
- 1979-82 - Priest-in-Charge of Darley with South Darley (Diocese of Derby)
- 1982-90 - Rector of Darley
- 1985-95 - Derby Diocesan Director of Ordinands
- 1989-2000 - Honorary Canon of Derby Cathedral
- 1990-2000 - Curate of Ashford-in-the-Water with Sheldon and Great Longstone

== Books ==
- Venn and Victorian Bishops Abroad (1978)
- Christian Mission in the Twentieth Century (1994)
- The Expansion of Christianity (2004)
- Pioneer Missionary, Evangelical Statesman: A Life of A. T. (Tim) Houghton (2011)
- The Conversion of the Maori: Years of Religious and Social Change (1814-1842) (2013)
