= Cockerton (surname) =

Cockerton is a surname. Notable people with the surname include:

- Dixie Cockerton (1925–1998), New Zealand netball player and coach
- John Cockerton (1927–2015), British Anglican priest and academic
- Stan Cockerton (born 1955), Canadian-American lacrosse player
