= Douglas Davies =

Welsh theologian and anthropologist

The Reverend Professor Douglas Davies FBA FAcSS FLSW
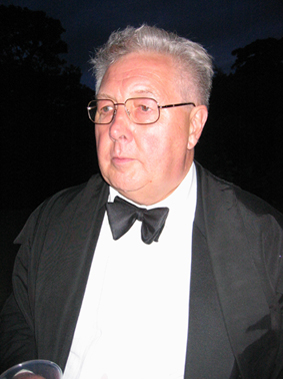
- Davies in 2006
- Born: 11 February 1947 (age 79)
- Citizenship: United Kingdom

Academic work
- Discipline: Anthropology, Religious studies, Theology
- Sub-discipline: Anglican leadership; Death and culture; Funerary rites; Study of religion; Mormon studies
- Institutions: University of Durham; University of Nottingham

Douglas James Davies, FBA, FAcSS, FLSW (born 11 February 1947) is a Welsh Anglican theologian, anthropologist, religious leader and academic, specialising in the history, theology, and sociology of death. He is Professor in the Study of Religion at the University of Durham. His fields of expertise also include anthropology, the study of religion, the rituals and beliefs surrounding funerary rites and cremation around the globe, Mormonism and Mormon studies. His research interests cover identity and belief, and Anglican leadership.

== Early life and education ==
Davies was born on 11 February 1947 in Llwynypia, the Rhondda Valley, but was brought up in Bedlinog, Wales. He was educated at Lewis School, Pengam, an old Grammar school in South Wales. He studied anthropology at St John's College, Durham, graduating with a Bachelor of Arts (BA) degree in 1969. He studied for a Master of Letters (MLitt) research degree in Mormonism at St Peter's College, Oxford and the Oxford Institute of Social Anthropology under the supervision of Bryan R. Wilson; he completed the degree in 1972. In 1971, he joined Cranmer Hall, an Anglican theological college attached to St John's College, Durham, to train for ordained ministry. During this time he also studied theology, graduating from Durham with a further BA degree in 1973.

Davies continued his studies post-ordination. He undertook research in meaning and salvation at the University of Nottingham, completing his Doctor of Philosophy (PhD) degree in 1980. His doctoral thesis was titled "The notion of meaning and salvation in religious studies". In 2004, he was awarded a Doctor of Letters (DLitt) degree by the University of Oxford; this is a higher doctorate awarded for research.

== Career ==
=== Academic career ===
In 1974, Davies joined the University of Nottingham as a lecturer in theology. He was promoted to senior lecturer in 1990, and appointed Professor of Religious Studies in 1993. In 1997, he moved to Durham University, where he had been appointed Principal of the College of St Hild and St Bede and Professor of Theology. In 2000, he stepped down as Principal and was appointed Professor in the Study of Religion. He was Head of the Department of Theology from 2002 to 2005, and has served as Director of the Centre for Death and Life Studies since 2007.

His current projects include writings on 'The Encyclopedia of Cremation', 'The Clergy and British Society: 1940–2000', 'A Brief History of Death', 'Inner-speech and prayer' and 'Ritual purity'.

He has also published a large number of articles on death, and contemporary Christianity.

Davies has been involved with various editorial boards and conferences, including the 'Editorial Board of Mortality' and the 'British Sociological; Association Religion Group' (Chairman: 2000–2003). He was also guest speaker at both the Scandinavian Sociological Society Conference in 2004 and the International Cremation Federation Conference in Barcelona, 2003.

Within the University of Durham he teaches the undergraduate modules: 'Study of Religion', 'Death, Ritual and Belief', 'Sects, Prophets and Gurus' and 'Theology and Anthropology'. He also teaches 'Ritual, Symbolism and Belief' to those studying a taught master's degree in theology.

He is a member of the Senior Common Room of St Chad's College Durham.

=== Ordained ministry ===
Davies was ordained in the Church of England as a deacon in 1975 and as a priest in 1976. From 1975 to 1997, he served a number of honorary curacies in the Diocese of Southwell and Nottingham: St Mary's Church, Attenborough (1975 to 1983); St Mary's Church, East Leake (1983 to 1985); and St Paul's Church, Daybrook (1991 to 1997). Since 2013, he has held permission to officiate in the Diocese of Durham.

== Honours ==
In 2009, Davies was elected an Academician of the Academy of Social Sciences (ACSS): the academicians were renamed as Fellows of the Academy of Social Sciences (FAcSS) in 2014. In 2012, he was elected a Fellow of the Learned Society of Wales (FLSW), the national academy of Wales. In July 2017, Davies was elected a Fellow of the British Academy (FBA), the United Kingdom's national academy for the humanities and social sciences.

In 1998, he was awarded an honorary Doctor of Theology (DTheol) degree by the Faculty of Theology at Uppsala University, Sweden.

His book, Reusing Old Graves: A Report on Popular British Attitudes, co-written with Alastair Shaw, won the 1995 Bookseller/Diagram Prize for Oddest Title of the Year.

== Selected works ==
His list of books include:

- Mors Britannica: Lifestyle and Death-style in Britain Today, 2015.
- Emotions and Religious Dynamics, with Nathaniel Warne, 2013.
- Natural Burial; Traditional-Secular Spiritualities and Funeral Innovation, with Hannah Rumble, 2012.
- Emotion, Identity and Death: Mortality across Disciplines, with Chang-Won Park, 2012.
- Emotion, Identity, and Religion: Hope, Reciprocity, and Otherness, 2011.
- Joseph Smith, Jesus, and satanic Opposition: Atonement, Evil and the Mormon Vision, 2010.
- The Theology of Death, 2008.
- Bishops, Wives and Children: Spiritual capital across the Generations, with Mathew Guest, 2007.
- A Brief History of Death, 2005.
- Encyclopedia of Cremation, editor, 2005.
- An Introduction to Mormonism, 2003.
- Anthropology and Theology, 2002.
- Death, Ritual and Belief, 2002, 1997, 2017.
- Modern Christianity: Reviewing its Place in Britain Today, 2000.
- The Mormon Culture of Salvation: Force, Grace and Glory, 2000.
- Private Passions: Betraying Discipleship on the Journey to Jerusalem, 2000.
- Themes and Issues in Christianity, 1997.
- Mormon Identities in Transition, editor, 1996.
- British Crematoria in Public Profile, 1995.
- Reusing Old Graves: A Report on Popular British Attitudes, 1995.
- Church and Religion in Rural England, 1991.
- Frank Byron Jevons: An Evolutionary Realist, 1991.
- Cremation Today and Tomorrow, 1990.
- Studies in Pastoral Theology and Social Anthropology, 1990.
- A Study of the Deployment and Work of the Rural Clergy in Five English Dioceses, 1990.
- Mormon Spirituality, 1987.
- Meaning and Salvation in Religious Studies, 1984.
