= Ronald Williams (bishop) =

British Anglican bishop (1906–1979)

The Right Reverend Ronald Williams
- Bishop of Leicester
- Church: Church of England
- Diocese: Diocese of Leicester
- In office: 1953 to 1979
- Predecessor: Vernon Smith
- Successor: Richard Rutt
- Other post: Principal of St John's College, Durham (1945–1953)

Orders
- Ordination: 1929

Personal details
- Born: Ronald Ralph Williams; 14 October 1906
- Died: 3 February 1979 (aged 72)
- Denomination: Anglicanism
- Education: Gonville and Caius College, Cambridge; Ridley Hall, Cambridge

Ronald Ralph Williams (14 October 1906 – 3 February 1979) was a Church of England bishop. He was Principal of St John's College, Durham from 1945 to 1953 and Bishop of Leicester from 1953 to 1979.

== Early life and education ==
Williams was born on 14 October 1906 to the Revd Ralph Williams and Mary (née Sayers). He attended The Judd School, a grammar school in Tonbridge, Kent. He went on to study English and theology at Gonville and Caius College, Cambridge and Ridley Hall, Cambridge. He obtained second class honours in Part I of the English Tripos in 1926, first class honours in Part I Theology Tripos, and a distinction in Part II of the Theology Tripos with which he graduated with Bachelor of Arts (BA) degree in 1928.

== Ordained ministry ==
Williams was too young to be ordained immediately after leaving university in 1928, and so spent the following year as a tutor at St Aidan's College, Birkenhead. Having been ordained in the Church of England, he served his curacy at Leyton Parish Church from 1929 to 1931, and became examining chaplain to the Bishop of Chelmsford in 1931. He then returned to Ridley Hall, Cambridge, the theological college where he trained for ministry, serving as its chaplain from 1931 to 1934. He was Home Education Secretary for the Church Missionary Society (CMS) from 1934 to 1940. With the outbreak of the Second World War, he joined the Religions Division of the Ministry of Information in 1940, and went on to serve as its director from 1943 to 1945.

In 1944, it was announced that he had been selected as the next Principal of St John's College, Durham in succession to C. S. Wallis. St John's College is both a residential college of the University of Durham and an evangelical Anglican theological college of the Church of England. He took up the appointment in 1945, and rebuilt the college physically and financially after the end of the War. He was also an honorary canon of Durham Cathedral from 1953 to 1954.

In October 1953, it was announced that Williams would be the next Bishop of Leicester. He was installed as diocesan bishop during a service at Leicester Cathedral in January 1954. He also served as President (ie its figurehead) of Queen's College, Birmingham from 1957 to 1963. He entered the House of Lords in 1959 as a lord spiritual. Although described as a liberal evangelical, he voted against an Anglican-Methodist reunion and was a staunch defender of the establishment of the Church of England. He abstained from voting on the Sexual Offences Act 1967: his twofold reasoning was that homosexuality should not be illegal but that it was still morally wrong, and so "the balance of my convictions can be expressed only by abstention". He retired in 1979, and was succeeded as Bishop of Leicester by Richard Rutt.

== Publications ==
- (1950) Authority in the Apostolic Age. London: SCM Press.
- (1952) The Perfect Law of Liberty: An Interpretation of Psalm 119. London: A. R. Mowbray.
- (1953) The Acts of the Apostles: Introduction and Commentary. Torch Bible Commentaries. London: SCM Press.
- (1965) The Letters of John and James. The Cambridge Bible Commentary. London: Cambridge University Press.
- (1966) What's Right with the Church of England. London: Lutterworth Press.
- (1971) I Believe, and Why. London: A. R. Mowbray.

Academic offices
Preceded by C. S. Wallis	Principal of St John's College, Durham; 1945 to 1953	Succeeded by Jim P. Hickinbotham
Church of England titles
Preceded by Vernon Smith	Bishop of Leicester; 1953 to 1979	Succeeded by Richard Rutt
