= Vernon Smith (bishop) =

British bishop (1880–1957)

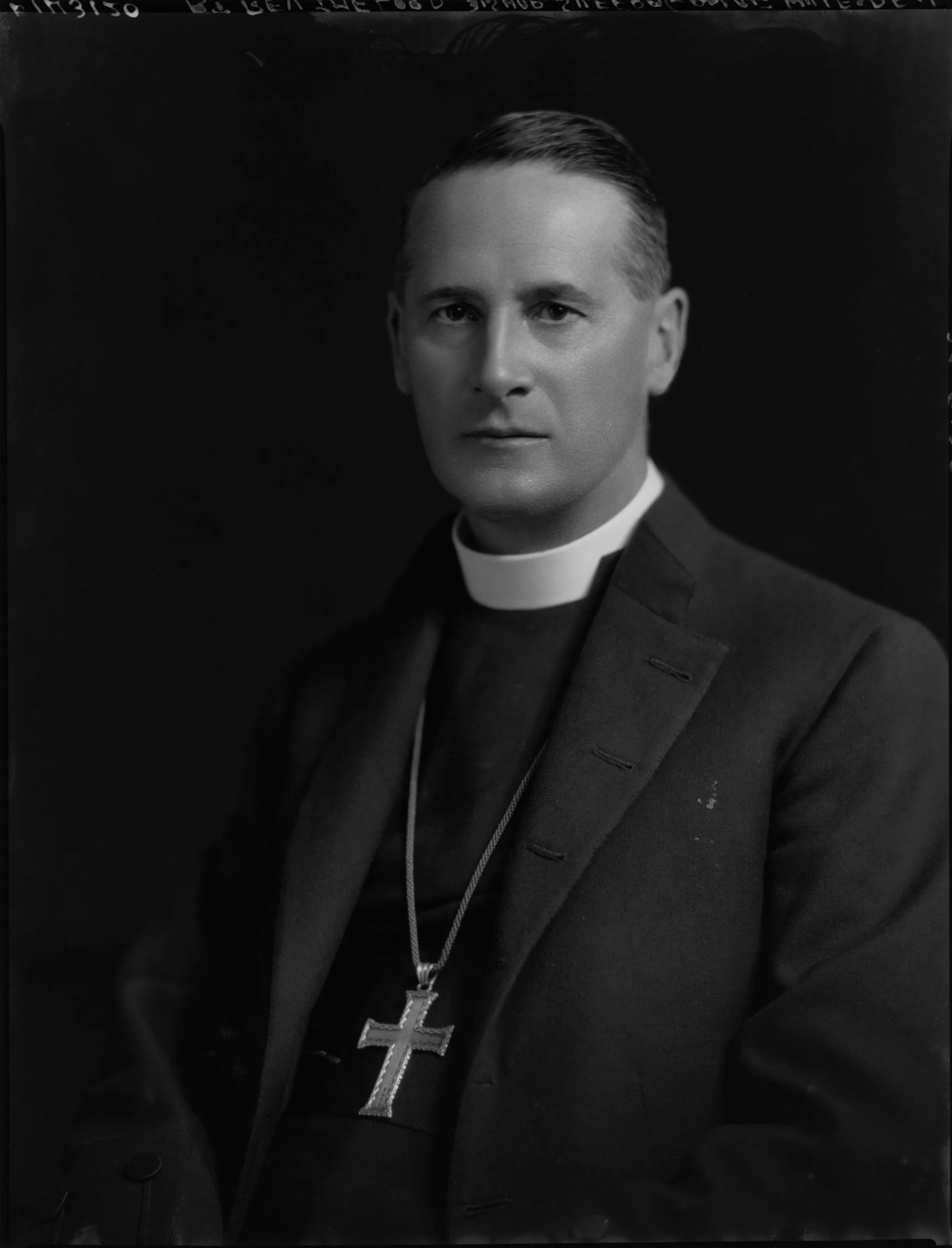
Smith in 1929

Guy Vernon Smith MC (15 October 1880 – 11 June 1957) was a Church of England clergyman who served as Bishop of Leicester from 1940 to 1953.

Smith was educated at Winchester and New College, Oxford. Following in the footsteps of his father, a King's Counsel, Smith was called to the Bar in 1905 but then decided on a career move from Law to the Church of England He was ordained in 1907, was a curate in Romford and, from 1909 to 1911, was Chaplain of Oxford House, Bethnal Green. This was 'like a Christian Welfare Society' with 1500 men and 500 boys in clubs, open every night. So began his long association with Arthur Winnington-Ingram, the dynamic Bishop of London. He became Resident Chaplain to the Bishop, and supported the Bishop noted for his jingoistic promotion of British commitment to the Great War. Winnington-Ingram was a renowned preacher who attracted massive publicity, and he toured the Western Front in 1914 with Smith who wrote a book about the visit. Smith himself then served on the Western Front with the Post Office Rifles, distinguishing himself at Bullecourt in June, 1917, winning a Military Cross - the citation for which read:

For conspicuous gallantry and devotion to duty in accompanying a party of volunteers to get in some wounded men that had been lying out some days. He attached himself to the party that had the most dangerous task and greatly encouraged them by his personal example and fearlessness under heavy fire. He was the first to go out and the last to return, setting a splendid example of devotion to duty

Smith caught trench nephritis and spent six months in hospital in England. He was, however, fit enough to accompany Winnington-Ingram on a tour of Greece, Salonica, Malta and Rome. He ended the War as a chaplain at Aldershot and then took up an appointment as Rector of Hackney. From 1925 to 1929 he was Archdeacon of Colombo but returned to London at the behest of Winnington-Ingram to be Suffragan Bishop of Willesden. He was consecrated a bishop on the Feast of St James 1929 (25 July), at St Paul's Cathedral by Cosmo Gordon Lang, Archbishop of Canterbury. Once again, Smith provided admirable support for Winnington-Ingram whose powers were waning and who did not resign until 1939 when he was in his eighties. The new Bishop of London was Geoffrey Fisher who proposed Smith for the vacant see at Leicester. Although Lang regarded Smith as 'old maidish', he supported Smith's candidature, and Smith was appointed to Leicester in 1940. Smith enjoyed a reputation in Leicester as a 'saintly man', 'with a patient pastoral care and administrative wisdom'. He retired in 1953. He has a commemorative plaque in Leicester Cathedral.

Church of England titles
Preceded by William Perrin	Bishop of Willesden; 1929–1940	Succeeded by Henry Montgomery Campbell
Preceded by Cyril Bardsley	Bishop of Leicester; 1940–1953	Succeeded by Ronald Williams
