= Clifford Leech =

20th-century Canadian literary scholar

Clifford Leech (1909–1977) was a prolifically published British-born professor of English at University College at the University of Toronto 1963-74. In The Cambridge Companion to Christopher Marlowe (2004), Patrick Cheney, its editor, describes Leech's contribution to Christopher Marlowe studies "historically important." His publications mainly concerned Elizabethan and Jacobean dramatists, including William Shakespeare, John Webster and John Ford. He also wrote a book on American playwright Eugene O'Neill.

Leech was a scholarly colleague of Northrop Frye.

== Life ==
He obtained his M.A. at the University of London in 1932 with an essay on the poet Thomas Southerne. His doctoral thesis at Queen Mary, University of London was "Private performances and amateur theatricals (excluding the academic stage) from 1580 to 1660" (1935).

While teaching at the University of Durham, Leech became Censor then, in 1948, the first Principal of St Cuthbert's Society, one of Durham's collegiate bodies. There he was acclaimed "not only in the quality of his scholarship but also in his services to the Society". He stepped down at Easter 1952. His portrait, by Thomas William Pattison (1894-1983) hangs in the college hall of St Cuthbert's in Durham.

In 1964 he succeeded A. S. P. Woodhouse as chairman of the Department of English at University College at the University of Toronto. In 1971 he gave up being general editor of the Revels Plays, a series he had conceived in the mid-1950s in imitation of the New Arden Shakespeare, applying that edition's methods of scholarship to other English plays before 1700. Leech turned over the Revels Plays to F. David Hoeniger.

Following his retirement, friends and colleagues established a prize named the 'Clifford Leech Prize', awarded annually for an outstanding PhD thesis on a dramatic topic completed at the Department of English or the Centre of Drama, Theatre and Performance Studies.

== Publications ==
Leech's earliest published works were many essays and articles for scholarly periodicals. Later, he edited his own and others' essays into published collections.

- Shakespeare's Tragedies, and Other Studies in Seventeenth Century Drama (1950)
- "Webster as a Dramatic Poet" (essay), in John Webster: A Critical Study (1951)
- John Ford and the Drama of His Time (1957)
- "History for the Elizabethans" (essay), in Shakespeare: A Chronicle (1962)
- The John Fletcher Plays (1962)
- John Ford (1963)
- O'Neill (1963)
- Webster: The Duchess of Malfi (1963)
- "When writing becomes absurd" and "The acting of Shakespeare and Marlowe": two addresses (1964)
- "Shakespeare's Greeks" (essay), in Stratford Papers on Shakespeare, edited by B. W. Jackson (1964)
- Marlowe: A Collection of Critical Essays (1964)
- Shakespeare: The Tragedies: a Collection of Critical Essays, ed. by C. Leech (1965)
- Essays on Marlowe, ed. by C. Leech (1965)
- Tragedy (1969)
- The Dramatist's Experience, with other essays in literary theory (1970)
- "On Editing One's First Play" (article), Studies in Bibliography (1970)
- The Revels History of Drama in English (with T. W. Craik; 1975)
- Christopher Marlowe: Poet for the Stage, ed. by Anne Lancashire (1986)
- "The Moral Tragedy of Romeo and Juliet" (essay), Critical Essays on Romeo and Juliet, ed. Joseph A. Porter (1997)

Leech also contributed essays to numerous volumes of Shakespeare Survey, including volumes one, three, six, seven, eight, nine, eleven, twelve, and twenty-six. His contributions deal with the meaning of Measure for Measure, with Shakespeare's style and language, the playwright himself, the comedies, and Hamlet.
