= Edward John Bolus =

Edward John Bolus (born 5 May 1879) was a poet and writer, civil servant, and clergyman. He spent his civil service career in India, which appears prominently in his writing.

== Life ==
=== Early years ===
Born 5 May 1879 to Harriet S. Bolus and her husband Edward, a schoolmaster in Stoke Newington in London, John studied at the Merchant Taylors' School, Northwood, and was in 1891 and 1892 elected to a Drapers' Company scholarship by the London School Board. He attended university “extension lectures" at Hugh Myddelton School in 1894 on "The Government of Great Britain and the Rights and Duties of English Citizens". In June 1898 Bolus gave the Greek oration at the Marchant Taylors' speech day, as well as acting as Cleon in an original-language performance of a scene from The Knights by Aristophanes.

He was then elected to a Jodrell Scholarship at The Queen's College, Oxford in November 1897 (and perhaps again in June 1898), matriculating for a BA in Classics in 1898. In 1900 he took a first class in the Classics Honour Moderations, and in 1902 a second class in the final honour school. In 1901–2, he was also secretary and then president of the Queens College Eglesfield Debating Society.

=== Civil servant ===
In 1902–3 Bolus took the civil service examination, and on 14 November 1903 arrived in India, where he served in Bombay and in due course Pune as assistant collector and magistrate. By 1905 he was a second assistant in Land Revenue and General Administration, and by 1 October 1915 an assistant collector, based in Pune. He was mobilised in 1914, and his highest acting rank was Capt. 26th (Sind) Bn. of the Indian Defence Force.

While in India, Bolus sustained his Classical interests and was an active member of the (apparently short-lived) Bombay Branch of the Classical Association, "which owed its existence mainly to the enthusiasm of a learned Jesuit, Father Ailinger". On 6 April 1911 he gave a lecture to the Branch on "Plato as a Literary Artist". It was no doubt his activities here that gave rise to his 1920 publication Bombaia, a long description of Bombay in Latin verse. He also appears to have been active in the Royal Asiatic Society: he appears in 1908 proposing one of several motions on the Bombay branch of the Society's journal subscriptions, arguing that "the Daily News be discontinued" and "that if it is necessary to include a Liberal Paper, the Chronicle be taken".

=== Clergyman ===
Around 1926 Bolus left the Civil Service, trained as a priest at Wycliffe Hall, Oxford and in that year was ordained a deacon in the Church of England by the Bishop of London, being posted to St Matthew's, Bayswater. By 1930 he was priest to Pamber and Monk Sherborne (which were in the gift of The Queen's College and were merged in that year), and in 1931 he graduated as a Bachelor of Divinity from the college. In 1932, he became a non-resident member of the Royal Asiatic Society. He was an active amateur golfer during 1936–39, at least, and in the same period he was active in attending dinners and parties for groups such as the Oxford Society, his college, the Civil Service, and the Royal Asiatic Society.

He remained the resident curate at Pamber Heath into the 1940s. In 1943, he was posted from being rector of Monk Sherborne to being rector of Weyhill. In 1947, he became vicar of Horton-cum-Studley, in Oxfordshire, returning him to near his old college, and promptly formed a village cricket club, becoming its chairman. He held the post until his retirement in 1952, also chairing the Parish Council from 1950 to 1952.

On 2 May 1949, he married Vivien Helen MacDiarmid, widow of Hugh MacDiarmid.

=== Retirement ===
In 1952, Bolus retired to Umtali, Rhodesia, appearing in the Royal Asiatic Society's 1959 list of members as resident at 9 Stevens Avenue, Morningside, Umtali, S. Rhodesia.

== Publications ==
- Edward John Bolus, Poems (Bombay: [n. pub.], 1913)
- E. J. Bolus, A Sehwan Reverie (Sehwan: Civil and Military Gazette Press, 1918)
- Eduardus Ioannes Bolus, Bombaia (Bombay: Pearson, 1920)
- John Bolus, Shires and Spires (London: Richards, 1921)
- E. J. Bolus, The Influence of Islam (London: Williams, Temple Bar Pub. Co. Ltd, 1932) [characterised by Arthur Stanley Tritton with the comment "this book will only annoy a Muslim and is not accurate enough for a Christian"].
