= Sidney Nowell Rostron =

English CoE priest & academic

The Reverend Sidney Nowell Rostron
- Principal of St John's College, Durham
- Church: Church of England
- In office: 1909 to 1911
- Predecessor: New post
- Successor: Dawson Dawson-Walker

Orders
- Ordination: 1906 (deacon); 1907 (priest) by Edmund Knox

Personal details
- Born: Sidney Nowell Rostron; 10 August 1883 Douglas, Isle of Man
- Died: 17 March 1948 (aged 64) Marston Moreteyne, Bedfordshire, England
- Denomination: Anglicanism
- Education: Liverpool College
- Alma mater: St John's College, Cambridge

Sidney Nowell Rostron (10 August 1883 – 17 March 1948) was a Church of England priest, theologian, and academic. He was the first Principal of St John's College, Durham, serving from 1909 to 1911. He then returned to parish ministry and was vicar of a number of parishes. During World War I, he served with the Army Chaplains' Department as a military chaplain. From 1928 to 1942, he was additionally Whitehead Professor of Pastoralia at the London College of Divinity.

== Early life ==
Sidney Nowell Rostron was born on 10 August 1883 in Douglas, Isle of Man. His father was the Reverend I. Rostron, a vicar. Sidney would later add his middle name to his surname to be known as Nowell-Rostron. He was educated at Liverpool College, then an all-boys public school in Liverpool, England. Having won a scholarship as the Sizer Exhibitioner, he matriculated into St John's College, Cambridge in 1903 to study the Theological Tripos. He graduated from the University of Cambridge in 1905 with a first class Bachelor of Arts (BA) degree; as per tradition, in 1909 his BA was promoted to a Master of Arts (MA (Cantab)) degree.

In 1905, Nowell Rostron was selected to become that year's Naden Divinity Student at St John's College. This is a scholarship that funds a year of post-graduate research in divinity. He was awarded the Hulsean Prize for an essay written in 1906. From 1905 to 1906, he also trained for ordained ministry at Ridley Hall, Cambridge, an Evangelical Anglican theological college.

== Ordained ministry ==
=== Early ministry ===
Nowell Rostron was ordained in the Church of England as a deacon in 1906 and as a priest in 1907; both times by Edmund Knox, the then Bishop of Manchester. From 1906 to 1909, he served his curacy at the Church of St George, Hulme, Manchester. During this time, he was also a lecturer at the Scholae Episcopi, a short-lived theological college in Manchester. In 1909, he was chosen as the first Principal of St John's Hall; a Church of England theological college and a new college of Durham University. During his headship of the college, he also held permission to officiate in the Diocese of Durham. In 1912, he left Durham to become Vicar of St Lawrence, Kirkdale, Liverpool. In 1914, he moved once again and became Vicar of St Andrew's Church, Maghull, Liverpool.

=== Military service ===
Nowell Rostron temporarily left his parish post to serve as a military chaplain during World War I. On 25 April 1916, he was commissioned into the Army Chaplains' Department as a temporary Chaplain to the Forces 4th Class (equivalent in rank to a captain). He spent 12 months serving on the Western Front in France. On 14 December 1918, he was made an Honorary Chaplain to the Forces 4th Class. He received two medals for his service: the British War Medal and the Victory Medal.

=== Later ministry ===
In March 1918, Nowell Rostron was appointed Secretary of the British and Foreign Bible Society. He held that appointment for a four-year term. In 1922, he became Vicar of St Matthew's, Bayswater. In 1928 or 1930, he joined the London College of Divinity as Whitehead Professor of Pastoralia; he held this academic position in addition to his parish ministry. In 1933, he moved to Berkshire where he had been appointed Rector of Bradfield.

In 1935, Nowell Rostron returned to London where he became Vicar of Paddington and a chaplain to St Mary's Hospital. In August 1941, he was appointed Vicar of St Stephen's Church, Lansdown in Bath, Somerset, and he left London to take up the post in the October. He finally stepped down as Whitehead Professor in 1942. From 1944 until his death in 1948, he was Rector of Marston Moreteyne in Bedfordshire.

== Personal life ==
Nowell Rostron was married to Ellen Vivian (née Davies) who was from Port Elizabeth, South Africa.

Nowell Rostron died on 17 March 1948 at the Rectory of Marston Moreteyne; he was aged 64.

== Selected works ==
- Nowell Rostron, Sidney (1912). The Christology of St. Paul: Hulsean prize essay, with an additional chapter. London: Robert Scott Publishing Limited.
- Nowell Rostron, Sidney (1931). St Paul's first epistle to the Corinthians: a devotional commentary. London: Religious Tract Society.
- Nowell Rostron, Sidney (1939). The challenge of calamity: a study of the book of Job. London: Lutterworth Press.
