= Richard Rutt =

Anglican bishop (1925–2011)

- Bishop of Leicester
- Richard Rutt, 1980s
- Diocese: Diocese of Leicester
- In office: 1979–1990 (ret.)
- Predecessor: Ronald Williams
- Successor: Tom Butler
- Other posts: Assistant Bishop of Daejeon (1966–1968); Bishop of Daejeon (1968–1973); Bishop of St Germans (1974–1979); Roman Catholic priest (1994–2011)

Orders
- Ordination: CofE: 1951 (deacon); 1952 (priest); RC: ? (deacon); 1995 (priest) by Edward Wynn (CofE Ely); Christopher Budd (RC Plymouth)
- Consecration: CofE: 1966

Personal details
- Born: 27 August 1925
- Died: 27 July 2011 (aged 85) Treliske Hospital, Truro, UK
- Denomination: Anglo-Catholic (until 1994); Roman Catholic (thereafter)
- Education: Pembroke College, Cambridge

Cecil Richard Rutt CBE (27 August 1925 – 27 July 2011) was an English Roman Catholic priest and a former Anglican bishop.

Rutt spent almost 20 years of his life serving as an Anglican missionary in South Korea, a country for which he developed a deep affection. He, like other scholar-missionaries such as James Scarth Gale, Homer B. Hulbert, George Heber Jones, and Anglican bishop Mark Napier Trollope, made significant contributions to Korean studies. Some years after he retired as an Anglican bishop, Rutt was one of several Anglicans received into the Roman Catholic Church in 1994. He was ordained a Roman Catholic priest the following year and spent the closing years of his life in Cornwall.

== Early life ==
Rutt was the son of Cecil Rutt and Mary Hare (née Turner). He was educated at Huntingdon Grammar School, Kelham Theological College in Nottinghamshire and Pembroke College, Cambridge, from which he received his Master of Arts degree.

== Anglican ministry ==
Rutt was made deacon at Michaelmas (29 September) 1951 and ordained priest on St Matthew's Day (21 September) 1952 — both times by Edward Wynn, Bishop of Ely, at Ely Cathedral. After a curacy at St George's Cambridge he went to South Korea as a missionary in 1954 together with Roger Tennant. In 1965 he was appointed Archdeacon of West Seoul. In June 1966 he was appointed an assistant bishop of the Diocese of Daejeon by Michael Ramsey, Archbishop of Canterbury; he was consecrated a bishop on 28 October 1966 (the Feast of SS Simon and Jude). In February 1968, his appointment as diocesan Bishop of Daejeon was announced. He was named a Commander of the Order of the British Empire in 1973.

Feeling that the time had come for Koreans to take charge of their portion of the Anglican Communion, in 1973 Rutt offered his resignation as Bishop of Daejeon, intending to continue serving as a simple parish priest in the country he had come to love so much. That proved to be impossible and in January 1974 he was appointed suffragan bishop of the Church of England's Diocese of Truro with the title Bishop of St Germans; He took up that post on Ascension Day (23 May) 1974; while in Cornwall he learned the Cornish language to celebrate weddings in Cornish. In October 1978 he was named Bishop of Leicester: he took up the See between his predecessor's retirement at the end of 1978 and his own enthronement on 24 March 1979.

In 1982 Rutt, who was always strongly inclined to Anglo-Catholicism, voted against the unity covenant with the Methodist, Moravian and United Reformed churches. In July 1985 he was introduced into the House of Lords. He retired on 1 October 1990 and went to live in Falmouth, in the Cornwall he had come to love. He died in his 87th year at Treliske Hospital, Truro.

== Roman Catholic ministry ==
In September 1994, Rutt became a Roman Catholic and in June 1995 he was ordained as a Roman Catholic priest by Christopher Budd, Roman Catholic Bishop of Plymouth, at Buckfast Abbey. He spent his last years in residence at St Mary Immaculate Parish in Falmouth. In 2009 he was made a Prelate of Honour, with the title of Monsignor, by Pope Benedict XVI. He was an honorary canon of Plymouth Cathedral.

== Korean studies and writings ==
While in Korea, from 1954 to 1974, Rutt studied in great depth the language, culture and history of Korea, as well as Classical Chinese. He was an active member of the Royal Asiatic Society Korea Branch, serving on the council, overseeing its publications and serving as its president in 1974. He published six scholarly papers in the RASKB's journal, Transactions, most of which reveal his deep knowledge of the Classical Chinese used in pre-modern Korea. His deep affection for the traditional culture of Korea, which had in fact almost ceased to exist by the time he arrived, was particularly expressed in his very popular volume, Korean Works and Days: Notes from the Diary of a Country Priest. One of his notable works of scholarship, apart from his translations, was his annotated edition (RASKB, 1972 / 1983) of the History of the Korean People by James Scarth Gale (first published in 1927) which includes a researched biography of the author. Like Gale, Rutt was fascinated by Classical Chinese and, after his retirement, he published a new translation of a challenging ancient Chinese classic, The Book of Changes, in 1996. He later assisted the historical research of the Anglican priest Roger Tennant as well as co-authoring the encyclopaedia Korea: A Historical and Cultural Dictionary with Keith Pratt. He was a member of both the Association of Korean Studies in Europe (AKSE) founded by William E. Skillend of SOAS and the British Association for Korean Studies (BAKS). In particular, Rutt was fascinated by traditional and formal sijo and older forms of Korean poetry in general. He owned a large collection of books related to Korea, including some rare Korean volumes, which he donated to the Bodleian Library at Oxford University.

== Knitting ==
Rutt developed a passionate interest in knitting and authored a history of the craft in A History of Hand Knitting (Batsford, 1987). His collection of books about knitting is now housed at the Winchester School of Art (University of Southampton). Rutt was involved with the Knitting & Crochet Guild since its inception in 1978 and was its president at the time of his death.

== Personal life ==
Rutt married Joan Ford (3 April 1919 – 17 September 2007) in Hong Kong in May 1969. He was a bard of the Cornish Gorseth. His Korean name was Tae-yŏng No.

== Selected works ==
In a statistical overview derived from writings by and about Rutt, OCLC/WorldCat encompasses roughly 30+ works in 70+ publications in three languages and 3,000+ library holdings

- 2002 — Martyrs of Korea
- 1999 — Korea: A Historical and Cultural Dictionary(with Keith L. Pratt)
- 1996 — The Book of Changes (Zhouyi): A Bronze Age Document
- 1987 — A History of Hand Knitting
- 1980 — A Nine Cloud Dream by Man-jung Kim
- 1974 — Virtuous Women: Three Classic Korean Novels
- 1972 — History of the Korean People (James Scarth Gale)
- 1971 — The Bamboo Grove: An Introduction to Sijo
- 1964 — Korean Works and Days: Notes from the Diary of a Country Priest
- 1958 — An Introduction to the Sijo, a Form of Short Korean Poem
- 1956 — The Church Serves Korea

Church of England titles
Preceded by John Daly	Bishop of Taejon; 1968–1974	Succeeded by Mark Pae
In abeyance Title last held by John Cornish	Bishop of St Germans; 1974–1979	Succeeded by Br Michael (Fisher)
Preceded by Ronald Williams	Bishop of Leicester; 1979–1990	Succeeded by Tom Butler
