= Christopher Byworth =

English priest, liturgist, and biblical scholar

The Reverend Christopher Byworth
- Born: Christopher Henry Briault Byworth; 22 January 1939; Stanmore, Middlesex, England
- Died: 31 August 2017 (aged 77–78)

Ecclesiastical career
- Church: Church of England
- Ordained: 1966 (priest)

Academic work
- Discipline: Biblical studies; liturgics
- Sub-discipline: New Testament studies
- School or tradition: Evangelical Anglicanism
- Institutions: Oak Hill Theological College; Cranmer Hall, Durham

Christopher Henry Briault Byworth (22 January 1939 – 31 August 2017 ) was an English Anglican priest, liturgist, and biblical scholar. Having held parish appointments in the dioceses of Chelmsford, Manchester, London and Norwich, he was Warden of Cranmer Hall, Durham, from 1979 to 1983. He then returned to parish ministry, serving for the rest of his career in the Diocese of Liverpool. As a liturgist, he co-authored the first, though illegal, modern English eucharistic liturgy for the Church of England in 1968, and was then involved in writing or contributing to a number of new services such as one for celebrating the birth of a child without baptism. An evangelical Anglican, he taught the New Testament at Oak Hill Theological College before joining the leadership of Cranmer Hall, an evangelical Anglican theological college. He died on 31 August 2017.

== Works ==
- Byworth, Christopher H. B. (1968). Eucharist for the Seventies. Northwood Christian Book Centre. OCLC 30289884.
- ———; Simpson, J. A. (1974). A Service of Thanksgiving and Blessing. Grove Liturgical Study. Vol. 5. Bramcote, UK: Grove Books. ISBN 9780901710437.
- ——— (1974). Communion, Confirmation and Commitment: Some Current Issues in Christian Initiation. Grove Liturgical Study. Vol. 8. Bramcote, UK: Grove Books. ISBN 9780901710512.
- ——— (1977). Using the Bible in Worship. Grove Liturgical Study. Vol. 11. Bramcote, UK: Grove Books. ISBN 9780905422213.
- ——— (1999). Millennium Liturgy. Grove Liturgical Study. Vol. 153. Bramcote, UK: Grove Books. ISBN 9781851744077.
