= Roger Tennant =

British priest and academic (1919–2003)

Father Charles Roger Tennant (Tasmania, 8 April 1919 - 30 June 2003) was an Anglican Priest, biographer of Joseph Conrad, and historian of Korea.

In 1936 he came to England to study aircraft design with Noel Pemberton Billing, writing two Planes Explained booklets During World War II he served in the 6th Airborne Division of the Parachute Regiment in France.

After the war he entered Lincoln Theological College and became curate at St Peter's Church, Belgrave, Leicester in 1951. In 1954 he answered Bishop Alfred Cecil Cooper's appeal for Anglican priests to go to Korea. After language study in 1954–1956, alongside Richard Rutt, Bishop John Daly assigned him to Chincheon, then in 1959 to Anjeong-ri near Pyeongtaek.

In 1962 he became vicar of the village of Bitteswell, near Lutterworth, retiring in 1988 to Ullesthorpe, where he wrote A History of Korea (1996).

== Publications ==
- Born of a Woman 1961 - a life of Christ which finished at the crucifixion.
- Joseph Conrad, a life published in 1981.
- Cast on a Certain Island a novel, Doubleday, Garden City, New York, 1970. Originally published as The Litany of St Charles Michael Joseph, 1968.
- A History of Korea 1996 - according to Richard Rutt "the first book of its kind to appear in English, and still not rivalled by any other."
