= Felix Swinstead =

English pianist and composer of educational music

Felix Gerald Swinstead (25 June 1880 – 14 August 1959) was an English pianist and composer. He wrote around 200 piano pieces, mostly for educational use by young children.

Swinstead was born in Stoke Newington, London and studied piano at the Royal Academy of Music with Tobias Matthay and composition with Frederick Corder. After many recitals in London, the UK and abroad during the 1900s Swinstead was appointed professor at the academy in 1910, becoming a Fellow in 1919. He remained there for the rest of his life. His most famous pupil was Harriet Cohen. Swinstead also travelled widely as an examiner, to Canada, South Africa and the West Indies, touring Australia and New Zealand in 1938. He wrote a book on piano playing, Technique with a Purpose (1934).

During the Second World War he acted as organist at St Matthew's Church in Bayswater. While there he composed a Te Deum for the church choir, which was published in 1941. His arrangement for piano in various musical styles of the nursery rhyme Oh Dear! What Can the Matter Be? was often used as a lighter, humorous element in his recitals. There is a modern recording by the American pianist Michael Stairs.

Swinstead married Evelyn Dawkin (also a pianist) and there were three children, two boys and a girl. Their address from the 1930s until the 1950s was 132 King's Henry Road, London NW3. His wife died in 1954. Swinstead died in 1959 at Southwold in Suffolk, aged 79.

A collection of his music is held at the Royal Academy of Music. A Cello Sonata, thought to be a late work composed not long before his death, was found among the possessions of his friends the pianists Vivian Langrish (1894–1980) and his wife Ruth Harte. It has been recorded by Lionel Handy and Jennifer Walsh.

== Selected works ==
(for piano unless otherwise stated)

- Red Gauntlet, for orchestra (1903)
- Seven Preludes (1908)
- Variations on a Theme by Concone (1910)
- Humoresque Op. 21
- Five Idylls, Op. 38
- Fantasie in B-flat minor (1916)
- Album Leaves, suite Op. 45 (1919)
- Polonaise, Op. 46
- Five Pastels, Op. 51
- Fancies Grave and Gay, suite Op. 53 (1921)
- Romance for violin and piano (1921)
- Prelude Romantique Op. 54
- Fancy Free, suite of children's pieces (1927) (includes 'In the Bay')
- Scarlatti Suite, for piano and strings (1933)
- Work and Play (suite of 12 elementary pieces) (ABRSM, 1935)
- Te Deum, unison chorus (1941)
- Ballade (1948)
- Ten Waltzes (1950)
- Cello Sonata (1950s?)
