= C. S. Wallis =

English Anglican priest (1874–1959)

The Reverend C. S. Wallis
- Principal of St John's College, Durham
- Church: Church of England
- In office: 1919–1945
- Predecessor: D. Dawson-Walker
- Successor: R. R. Williams

Orders
- Ordination: 1902

Personal details
- Born: Charles Steel Wallis; 1874
- Died: 6 June 1959 (aged 84–85)
- Profession: Clergyman and academic
- Education: Hatton House School
- Alma mater: London College of Divinity; Durham University

Charles Steel Wallis (1874–1959) was a British Church of England priest, British Army chaplain, and academic. From 1902 to 1912, he was a tutor then Vice-Principal of the London College of Divinity. He was a military chaplain during World War I. From 1919 to 1945, he was Principal of St John's College, Durham, and a lecturer in ecclesiastical history and in logic at Durham University.

== Early life ==
Wallis was born in 1874 to William Wallis, a solicitor. He was educated at Hatton House School, Newark-on-Trent, Nottinghamshire.

== Career ==
Following school, Wallis studied at the London College of Divinity and completed the universities preliminary theological examination (the exam for none-degree ordinands) in 1902. He was then ordained in the Church of England. He continued his studies at Durham University, graduating with a Bachelor of Arts (BA) degree in 1906 and a Master of Arts (MA) degree in 1909.

Having been ordained, he joined the staff of the London College of Divinity in 1902. In 1903, he was appointed a college tutor. He served as dean from 1904 to 1912.

In 1912, he left to join St John's College, Durham as vice-principal and chaplain. He took a break from St John's between 1915 and the end of World War I to serve as a military chaplain. Following his return from war in 1919, he took over as principal of St John's College. During his time leading the college, he extended its size, acquired further buildings and increased its finances. In 1930, he was additionally appointed rector of St Mary-le-Bow, Durham (now a redundant church housing Durham Museum and Heritage Centre). At various times, he was a lecturer in ecclesiastical history and in logic at Durham University, sub-warden of the colleges, and a member of the Durham University Council.

He retired in 1945 and died on 6 June 1959.

=== Military service ===
Wallis became a military chaplain in 1915 and served with the Mediterranean Expeditionary Force during World War I. On 7 May 1915, he was appointed a temporary Chaplain of the Forces 4th Class (equivalent to the rank of captain) in the Army Chaplains Department, British Army. In July 1915, he sailed for the Dardanelles and the Gallipoli Campaign. His duties on the transport ship included taking services, keeping up the spirits of the men and censoring the troops letters home. Ashore, he duties included basic first aid (undressing troops and washing wounds), giving last rites and holding funerals. He would also accompany hospital ships taking the wounded from the battlefield to hospitals in Egypt or Malta; he continued his basic first aid duties, services, funerals and additionally acted as letter writer for the wounded.

== Selected works ==
- Wallis, C. S. (1917). Fifty thousand miles on a hospital ship. London: The Religious Tract Society.

Academic offices
Preceded by Dawson Dawson-Walker	Principal of St John's College, Durham; 1919 to 1945	Succeeded by Ronald Williams
