= St Matthew's, Bayswater =

Coordinates: 51.511667°N 0.191176°W

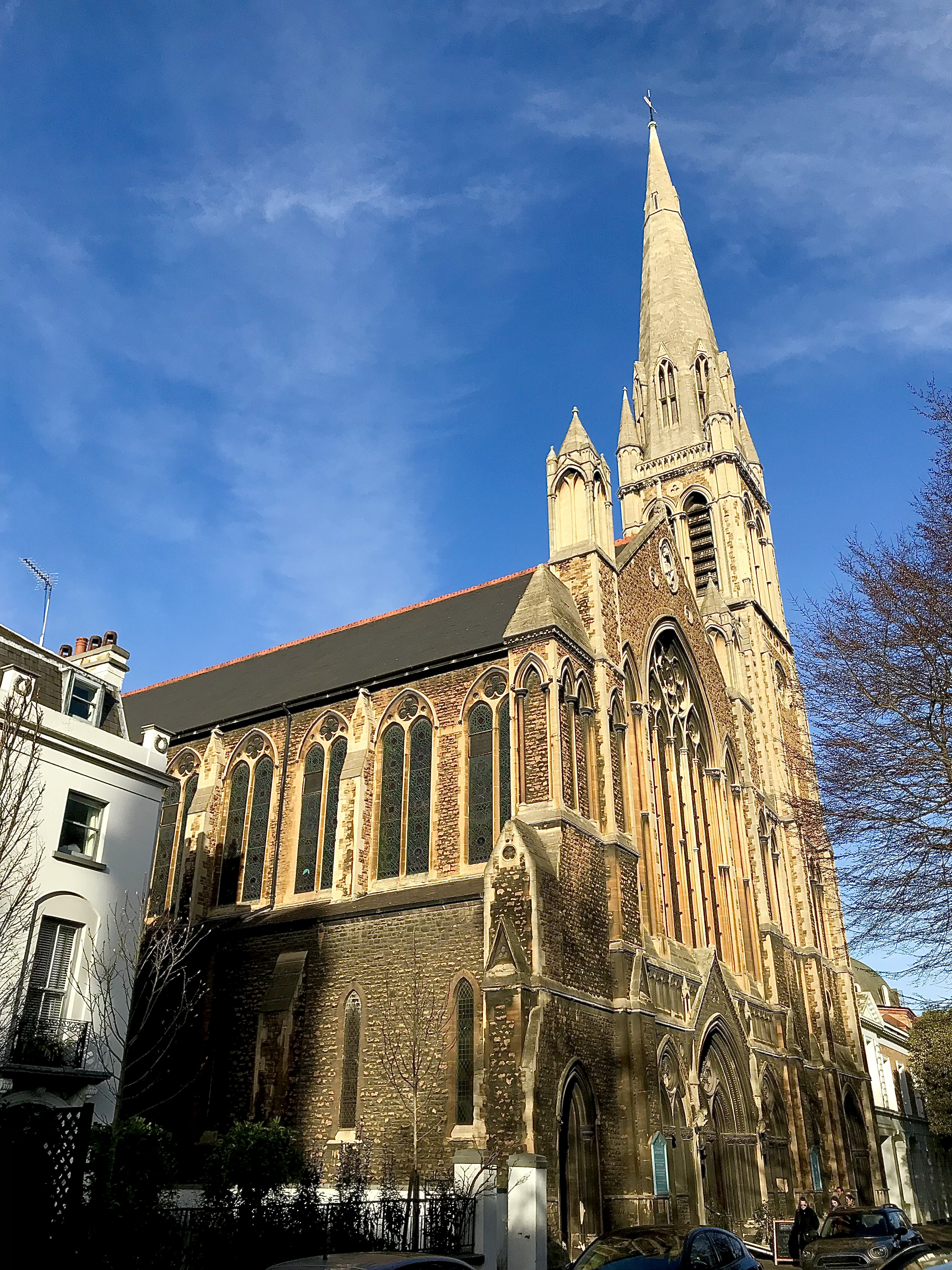
- St Matthew's, Bayswater
- OS grid reference: TQ 25619 80744
- Location: St. Petersburgh Place, Bayswater, London, W2 4LA
- Country: England
- Denomination: Church of England

History
- Status: Active

Architecture
- Functional status: Parish church
- Heritage designation: Grade II* listed

Clergy
- Vicar: The Revd Will Coleridge

St Matthew's is a Church of England parish church, located in St. Petersburgh Place, Bayswater, London, near the New West End Synagogue and Greek Orthodox Cathedral of Saint Sophia. It is a Grade II* listed building, executed in the Victorian Gothic revival style.

== History ==
The church was built in 1880, by London-born architect John Johnson (1843 – 1919). Some of the stained glass is probably by Morris & Co. The organ is by J. W. Walker & Sons Ltd. The church, in Victorian Gothic Revival style, was funded by John Derby Allcroft of Stokesay Court in Shropshire, one of several London churches he financed. It was completed in 1882, replacing the earlier Bayswater Chapel constructed in 1818. A large congregation flocked to hear the incumbent, Archdeacon James Hunter, who had recently returned from missionary work with the Cree of Canada.

== Present day ==
The parish continues to use the Book of Common Prayer (BCP) at most of its services, rather than the modern Common Worship.

== Notable people ==
- Rennie MacInnes, Bishop of Jerusalem, was a curate from 1896 to 1899.
- Sidney Nowell Rostron, formerly Principal of St John's College, Durham, was vicar from 1922 to 1933.
- Hugh Gough, subsequently Archbishop of Sydney and Primate of Australia, was vicar from 1939 to 1946.
- Edward John Bolus was a deacon in 1926.
- Composer Felix Swinstead was organist during World War 2 and wrote a Te Deum for the church choir in 1941.

== Gallery ==
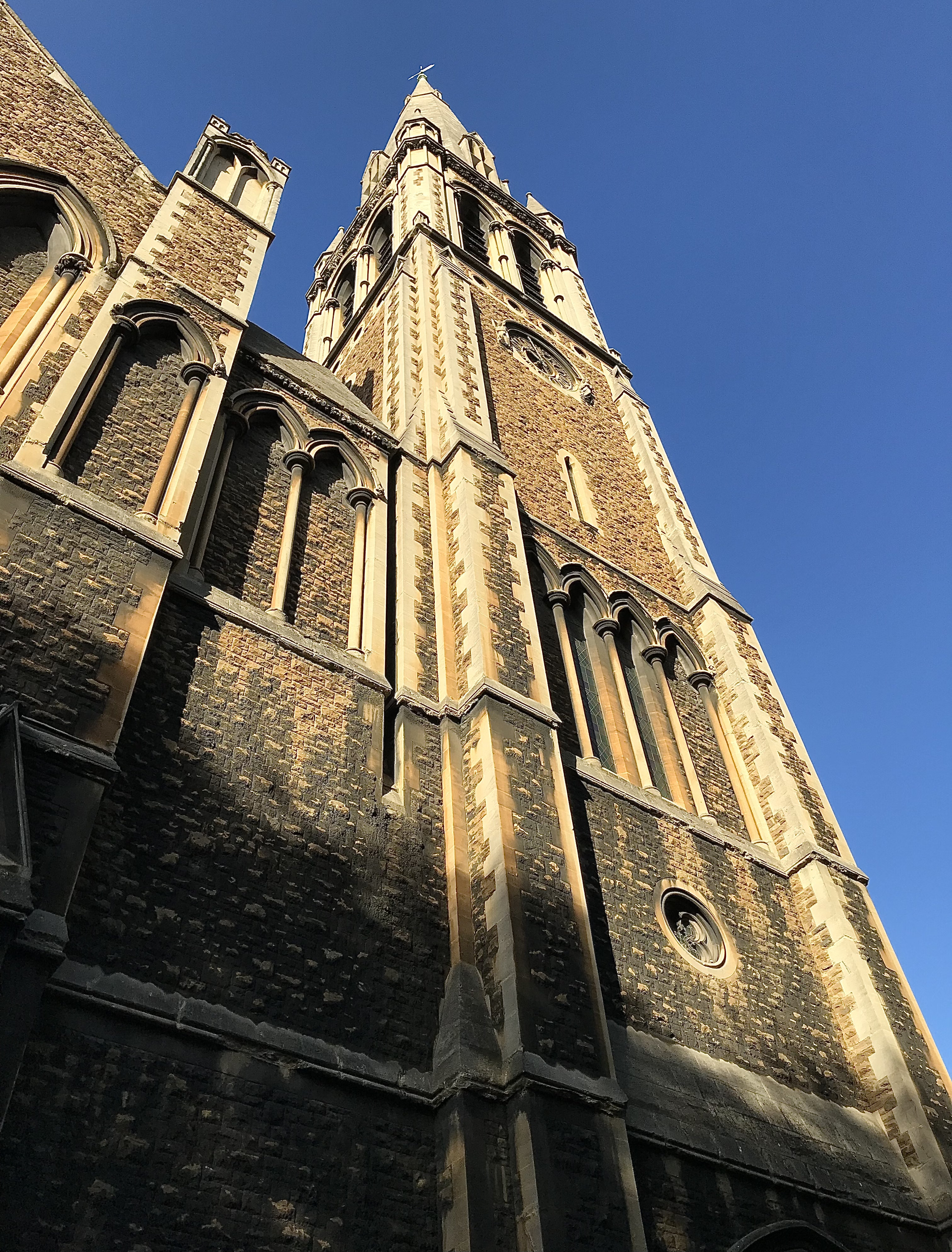
East face: spire and its tower, viewed aslant in Autumn sunlight

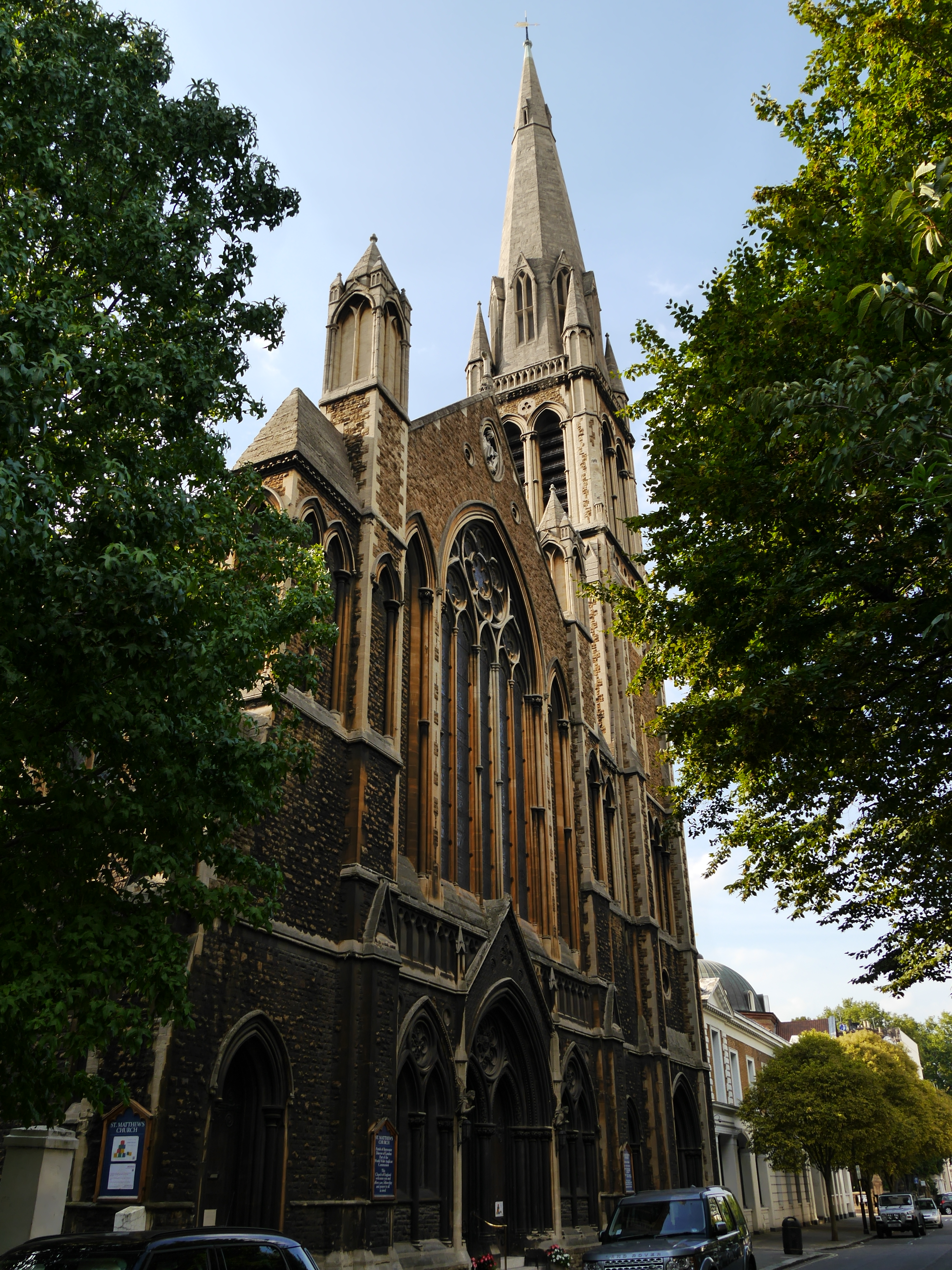
In Summer, shaded by foliage of street trees

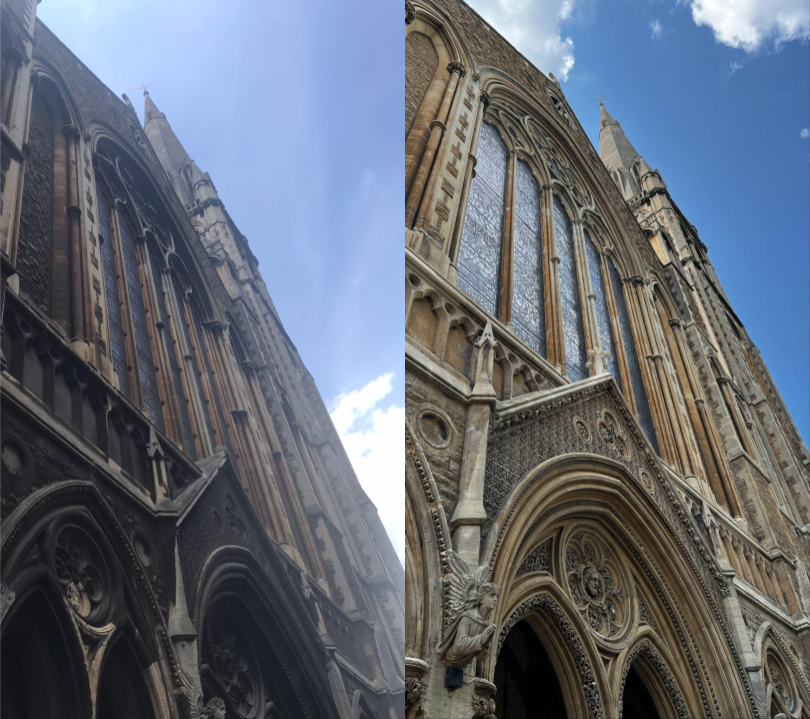
Facade of the church before (right, 2023) and after (left, 2025) restoration
