= St John's College, Durham =

Recognised college of Durham University

St John's College
- Durham University
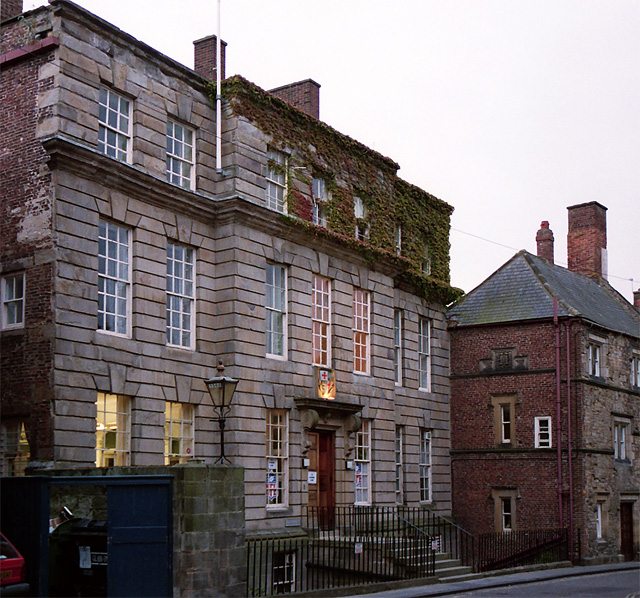
- Haughton House, St John's College

- Arms of St John's College; Arms: Quarterly argent and azure, in the first and fourth a cross formy quadrate gules, in the second·an eagle wings elevated and inverted Or, in the third a lion rampant crowned with an ancient crown of the last; all within a bordure quarterly of the second and gold.
- Coordinates: 54.7718825°N 1.5757305°W
- Latin name: Collegium Sancti Ioannis
- Motto: Latin: Fides nostra victoria
- Motto in English: Our faith is our victory
- Established: 1909; 117 years ago
- Namesake: St John the Evangelist
- Principal: Jolyon Mitchell
- Warden: Nicholas Moore
- Undergraduates: 392
- Postgraduates: 160
- Senior tutor: Rebecca Bouveng
- Mascot: Olav III (an alligator)
- Website: St John's College

Map
- Location within Durham, England

UNESCO World Heritage Site
- Part of: Durham Castle and Cathedral
- Criteria: Cultural: ii, iv, vi
- Reference: 370
- Inscription: 1986 (10th Session)

St John's College is one of the recognised colleges of Durham University. The college was established in 1909 as a Church of England theological college and became a full constituent college of the university in 1919. The college consists of John's Hall for students studying on any university course and Cranmer Hall (with its own master or warden), an Anglican theological college in the open evangelical tradition. All part time and distance learning postgraduate students reading for theology are automatically assigned to St John's. Started as a men's college, it was the first Church of England theological college to train men and women together, where it subsequently became mixed.

St John's is Durham's second smallest college only to St Chad's. Being an independent college, St John's is financially and constitutionally independent of the university and has a greater degree of administrative independence than the other, "maintained", colleges. However, to maintain its status as a recognised college, the university council must approve the appointment of its principal and be notified of changes to its constitution.

The college has a reputation for being religious because it is the only college in Durham authorised to train people to priesthood. The college is traditional and Johnians hold their own matriculation ceremony in their 12th-century chapel, in addition to the university wide matriculation at the Cathedral; members of St John's are also required to wear gowns for weekly formal dinners, and still say grace in Latin. St John's is the only college in Durham to not charge its students to attend formals. Students also get £75 credit for laundry, the only college to offer this. The college chapel (Church of St Mary the Less) is also the final resting place of Dame Elizabeth Bowes. She had ten children and Queen Elizabeth The Queen Mother was descended from her third son, George Bowes.

== History ==
Founded as a Church of England theological college in 1909, the members of the initial College Council were:

- Very Rev. Henry Wace, Dean of Canterbury
- Robert Armitage, MP for Leeds Central
- William Cruddas
- William Joynson-Hicks, Viscount Brentford
- Godfrey Allan Solly
- Percy John Heawood, Vice-chancellor of Durham University & Professor of Mathematics
- John Price Hargreaves
- Rev. Professor Dawson Dawson-Walker, First Principal & Van Mildert Professor of Divinity
- Rev. John Alfred Lightfoot
- Rev. Dr Albert William Greenup, Principal of London College of Divinity
- Rev. Frederick Sumpter Guy Warman, Principal of St Aidan's College, Birkenhead
- Rev. Cyril Charles Bowman Bardsley, Bishop of Leicester
- Rev. Charles Lisle Carr, Bishop of Coventry
- Rev. Frank Theodore Woods, Bishop of Peterborough
- Rev. James Theodore Inskip, Bishop of Barking
- Rev. John Hall How
- Rev. John Edwin Watts Ditchfield, Bishop of Chelmsford

The college became a full constituent college of the university in 1919. In 1958 it was divided into Cranmer Hall theological college and the non-theological John's Hall. The halls have always held to a broadly evangelical tradition.

In 1973 St John's became the first Durham undergraduate male college to admit female students, though Cranmer Hall had been admitting women for theological education since 1966. St John's was the first Church of England theological college to have both a lay person and a woman as principal (Ruth Etchells).

The college has an advowson (a right to appoint clergy to a parish) over four benefices: Chester-le-Street and Stranton in the Diocese of Durham and jointly with other avowees the benefices of Doddington with Benwick and Wimblington, and St Mark with St Paul, Darlington. Previously, the patron had complete power to appoint the new priest, however that power is now exercised jointly with the local bishop and parish.

== Buildings ==
Entrance to Haughton House

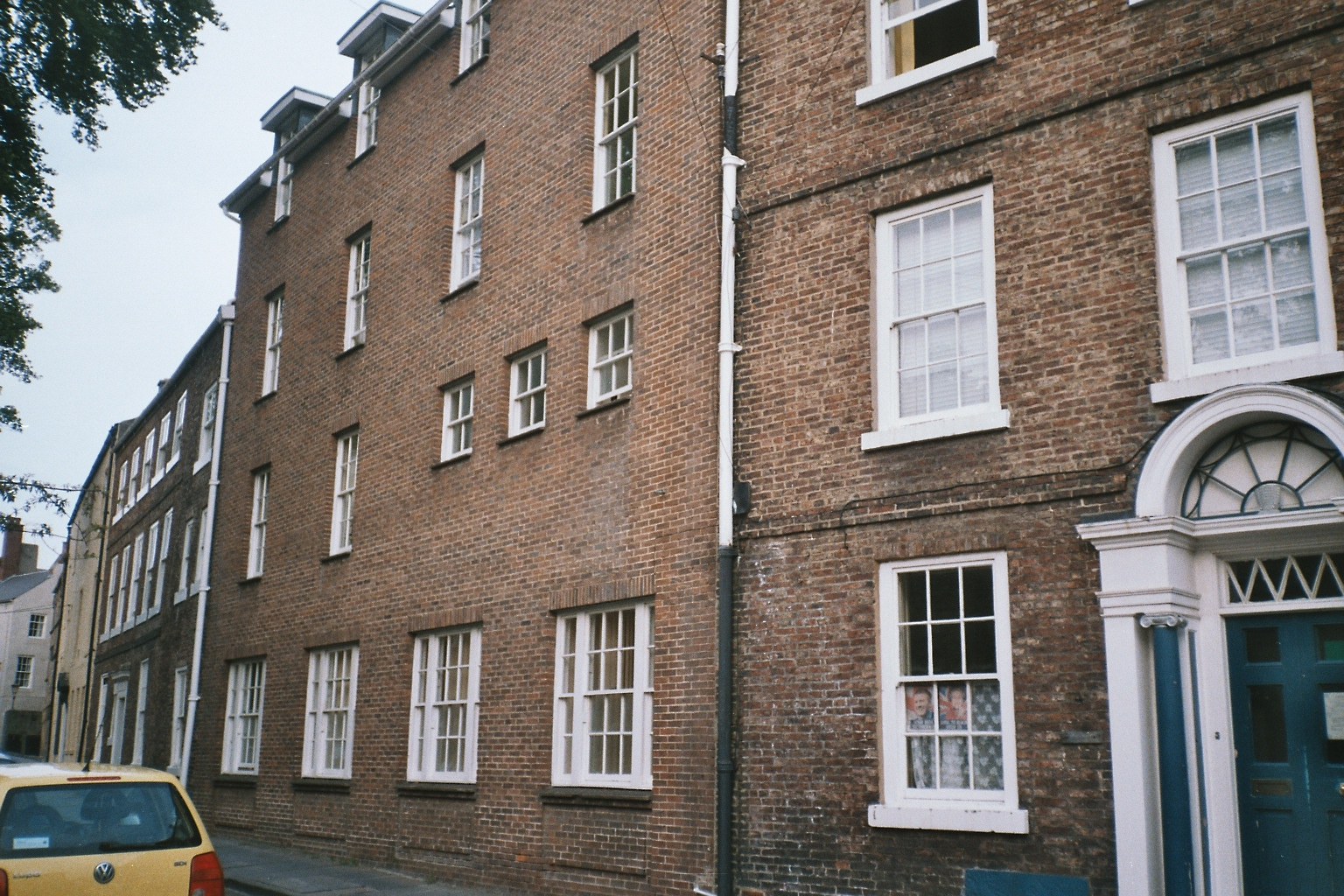
Cranmer Hall, South Bailey, Durham

The college is formed from a number of Georgian houses on the Bailey between Durham Cathedral and the River Wear. The main house is Haughton House, named after Haughton Castle in Northumberland, the seat of the family of William Donaldson Cruddas who were early benefactors of the college and other Christian churches and charities in the north east of England. The houses which make up Cranmer Hall were once owned by the Bowes-Lyon family (the late Queen Elizabeth The Queen Mother's family). The majority of the college buildings are grade II listed, with parts of 3 and 4 South Bailey grade II* listed. Before coming into the possession of St John's, Linton House, no 1 South Bailey, was the main property of St. Chad's College. It is said to have much earlier origins, with the frontage seen today added to an existing timber-framed building after the Restoration of the Monarchy in 1660.

No 2 South Bailey has distinctive circular "blind" windows which were revealed during a re-rendering in the 1980s. This enabled Martin Roberts, then Durham City's conservation officer, to date the building precisely to the late 17th century.

The illogically interconnected nature of many of the college buildings regularly results in visitors becoming lost. The similarly unusual nature of college stairways, one of which disappears into a solid wall, adds an element of Escher to the architecture.

The college chapel, dedicated to St Mary and known as St Mary the Less, is of Norman origin and was rebuilt in the 1840s and re-ordered at the turn of the 21st century. It became the college chapel in 1919, before which it had been the parish church of the South Bailey. It is still a chapel of ease in the Parish of St Oswald. The chapel is also used by the local Greek Orthodox congregation.

== Student life ==
Owing to its small population, Johnians tend to know one another regardless of year, course or accommodation (the majority of first years and finalists live in college; the second years are required to find their own accommodation). Elected Freshers Reps give new Johnians opportunities for one-on-one interaction.

=== Grace ===
The college grace is customarily said before dinner in the hall. Additionally, there is usually a ‘High Table’ at formal, which normally consists of ‘Guests of the Principal’, seated on the raised platform of Leech Hall. Unlike other Durham colleges, college formals are free, three course dinners that regularly runs throughout the year. Students who are leaving the hall during a formal dinner are expected to get up from their seat discreetly, bow to the high table, and then take their leave. Upon coming back to formal, they will have to bow to the high table again and walk back to their seat.

Grace	Latin	English
Ante Prandium (Before Dinner)	Benedic Domine nobis et donis tuis quae de tua largitate sumus sumpturi, et concede ut, illis salubiter nutriti, tibi debitum obsequium praestare valemus. Amen.	Bless us, O Lord, and your gifts, by which, of your bounty, we are about to be nourished, and grant that, healthily sustained by the same, we may offer you the service that we owe. Amen.

=== Sports & Societies ===
St John's participates in a number of sports such as cross country running, mixed lacrosse, rowing, men's football, badminton, hockey and rugby among others. St John's College Boat Club was founded in 1910 and operates out of two boathouses on the River Wear. The college's theatre company, Bailey Theatre Company, is ratified by Durham Student Theatre and is open to any member of the university. Their 2019 performance of Alan Ayckbourn's "Family Circles", produced in collaboration with St. Chad's, featured a cast and production team formed entirely from first-year students.

Other performances include Sarah Kane's 4.48 Psychosis in the Epiphany term of 2009 and Arthur Miller's The Crucible in the Michaelmas term of 2008. The company also puts on an annual Shakespeare performance after university examinations in the summer. This traditionally involves an outdoor performance on Library Lawn, though the college's newly refurbished amphitheatre was used in 2019. In 2008, the society's performance of Christopher Marlowe's Doctor Faustus won the Durham Student Theatre Award for Best Play.

John's Music Society, founded in 2012, is the governing body for music within college. It regularly puts on large-scale concerts and helps students set up new musical ensembles as well as organising socials and concert trips for its members. The society is also responsible for organising popular 'open mic nights' and the annual JMS barbecue.

== List of principals ==
- 1909–1911 Sidney Nowell Rostron
- 1911–1919 Dawson Dawson-Walker
- 1919–1945 Charles Steel Wallis
- 1945–1953 Ronald Williams
- 1954–1955 G.J. Cumming (acting)
- 1954–1969 Jim P. Hickinbotham
- 1970–1978 John C. P. Cockerton
- 1978–1988 Ruth Etchells
- 1988–1992 Anthony Thiselton
- 1992–1999 David V. Day
- 1999–2006 Stephen Sykes
- 2006–2023 David Wilkinson
- 2023–present Jolyon Mitchell

== Notable alumni ==
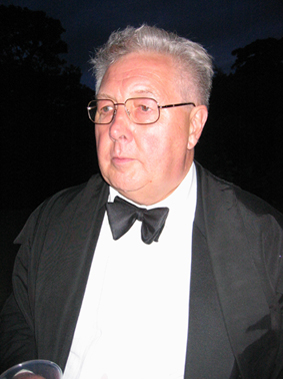
Douglas Davies, academic

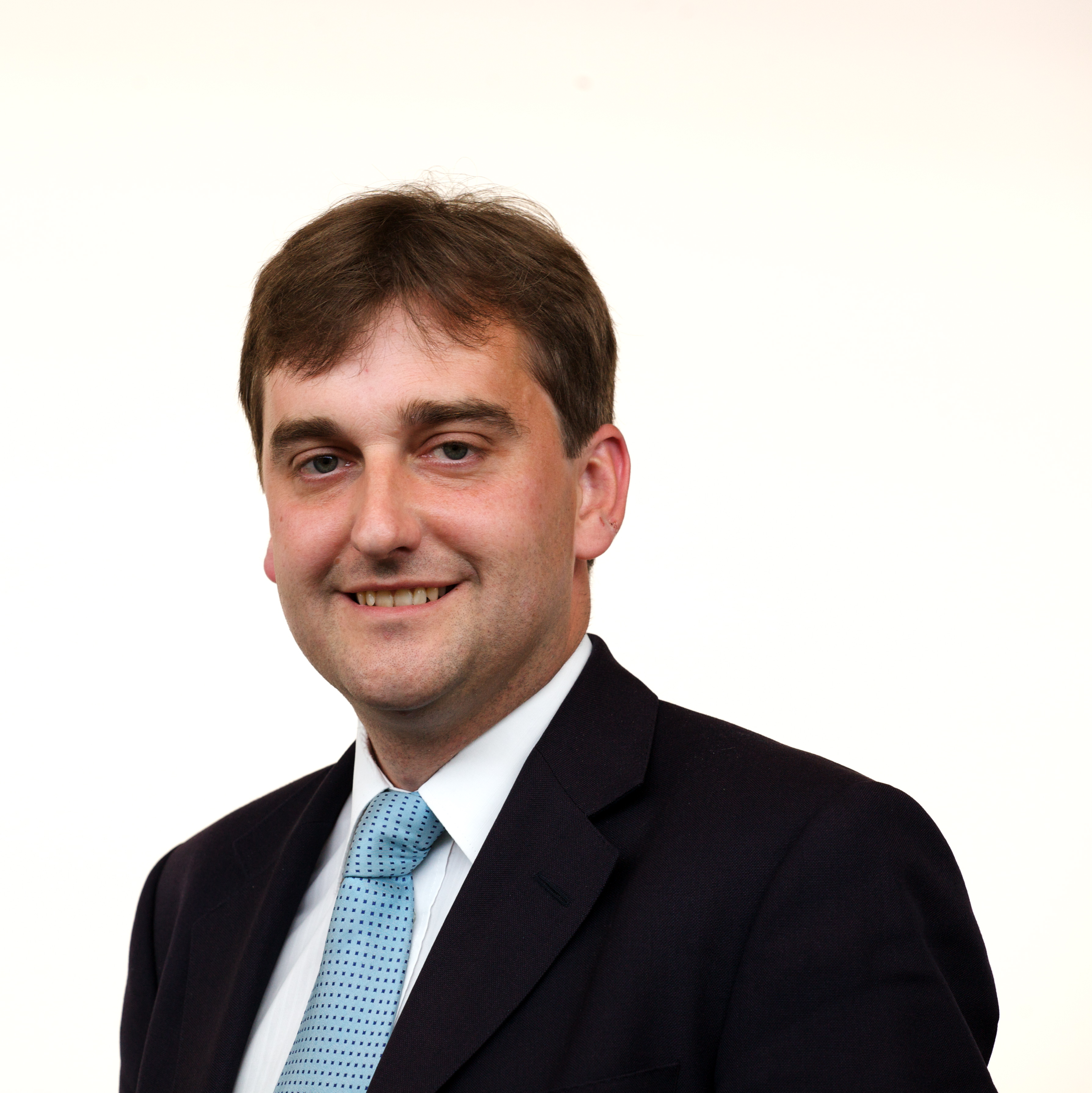
Nick Ramsay, conservative politician

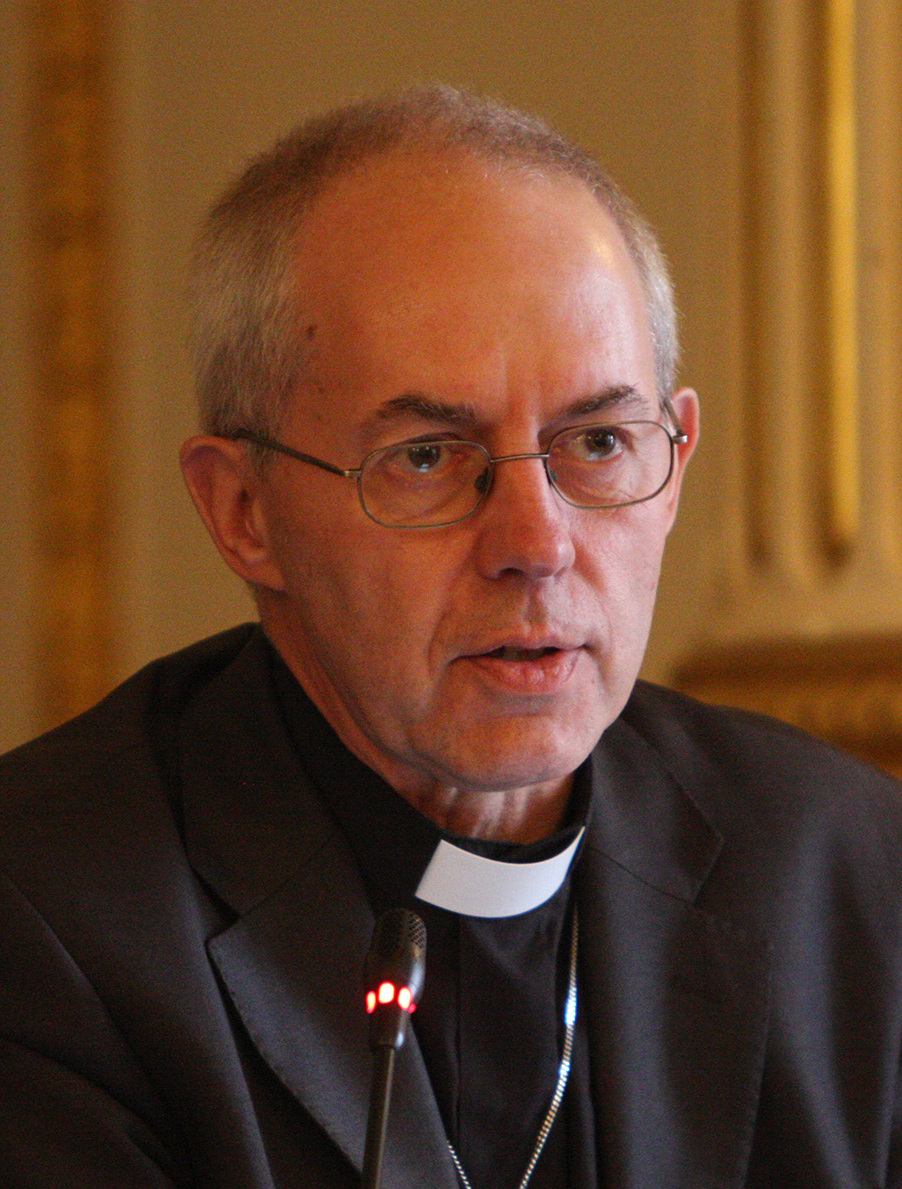
Justin Welby, the former Archbishop of Canterbury

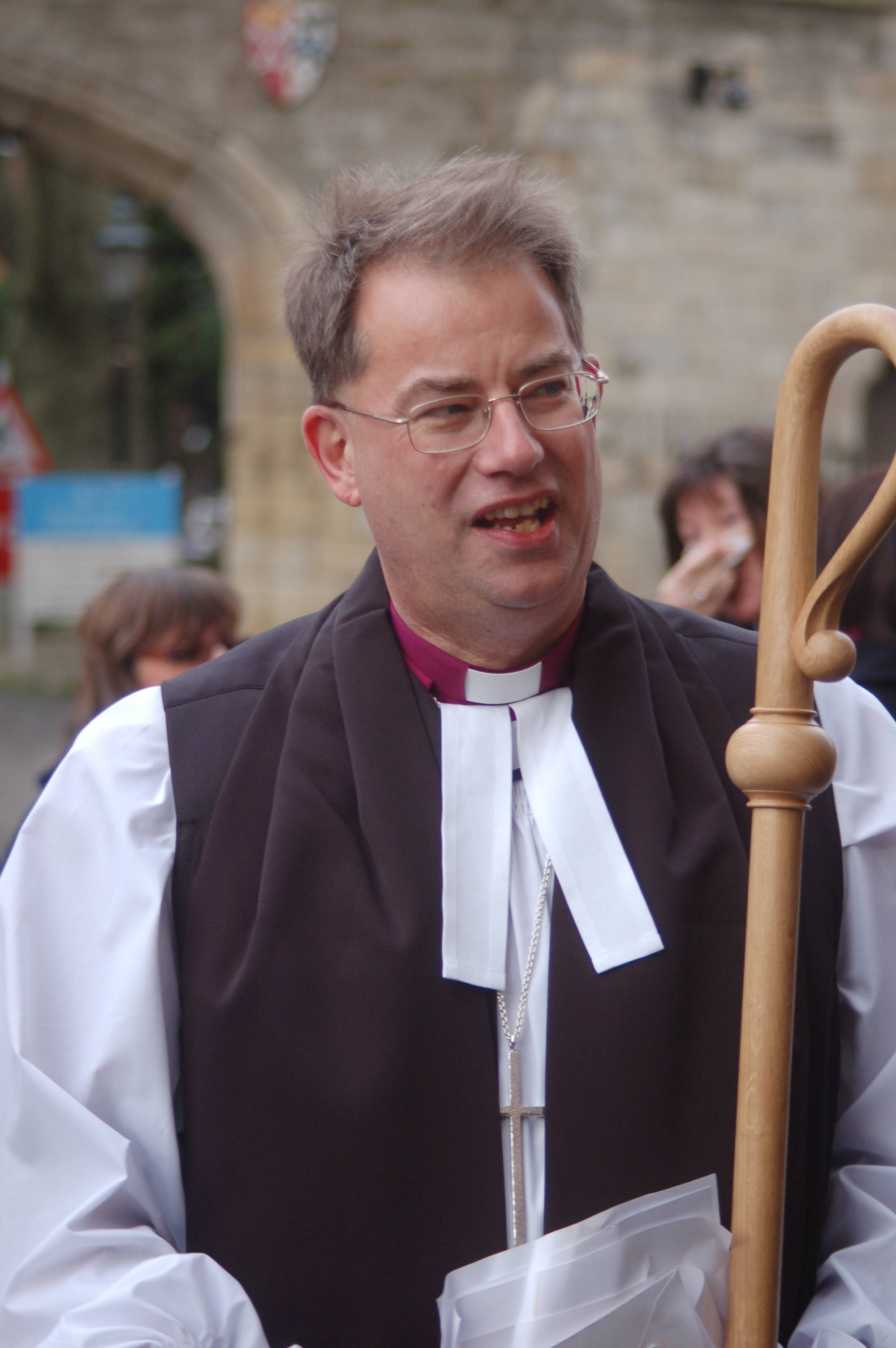
Steven Croft, bishop of Oxford

=== John's Hall ===
- Richard Adams, pioneer of fair trade and founder of Traidcraft
- Norman Aspin – High Commissioner to Malta
- James Bell, Bishop of Knaresborough, area Bishop for Ripon
- Richard Blackburn, Bishop of Warrington
- Mark Bryant, Bishop of Jarrow
- Douglas Davies, theologian
- Gavin Hewitt - special correspondent for BBC News
- Ben Howlett - Conservative MP for Bath (UK Parliament constituency) 2015 - 2017
- Andrew Macrae (judge) - Vice President of the Court of Appeal of Hong Kong
- Alice Oseman - author (Heartstopper, Solitaire)
- Jack Plumley, Sir Herbert Thompson Professor of Egyptology, Cambridge; trained for ordination at St John's college before the theological college was split off into Cranmer Hall
- Nick Ramsay MS, Conservative former Senedd Member for Monmouth and Shadow Finance Minister
- James Roscoe – Acting British Ambassador to the United States (2025-)
- Rachel Schofield – journalist and BBC News presenter
- Michael Volland - Bishop of Birmingham

=== Both ===
- Michael Beasley, Bishop of Bath and Wells
- Chris Edmondson, former Bishop of Bolton
- Robert Paterson, former Bishop of Sodor and Man
- Geoff Pearson, Bishop of Lancaster
- John Saxbee, former Bishop of Lincoln
- Richard Turnbull, Principal of Wycliffe Hall, Oxford
- Justin Welby, former Archbishop of Canterbury

== Gallery ==
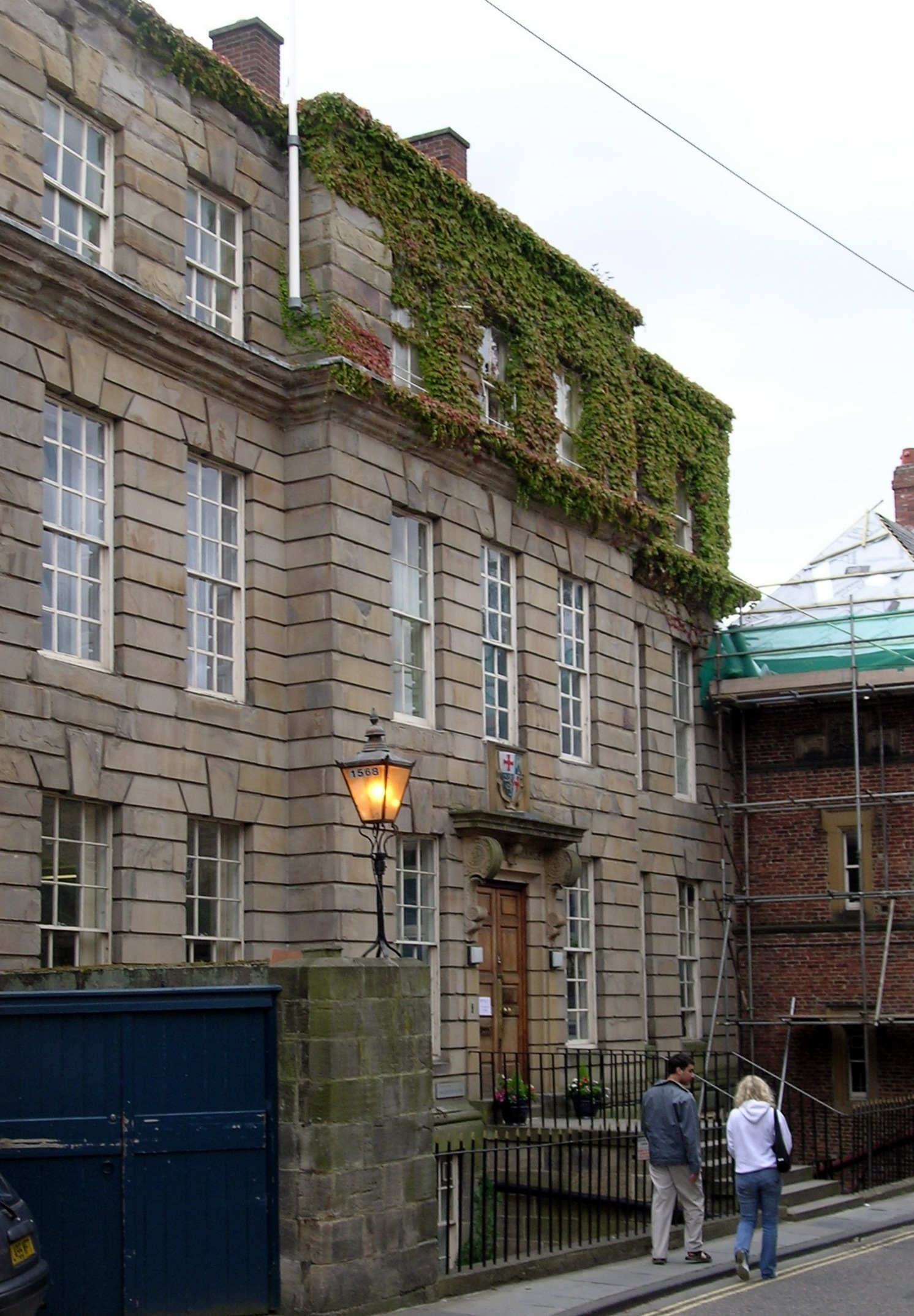
Haughton House

St. Mary the Less college chapel

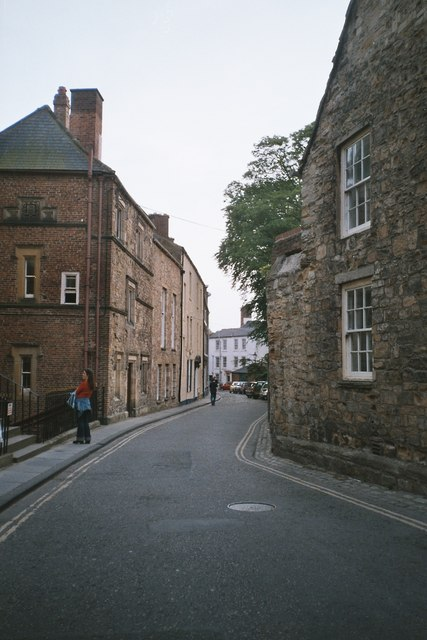
St. John's viewed from the South Bailey

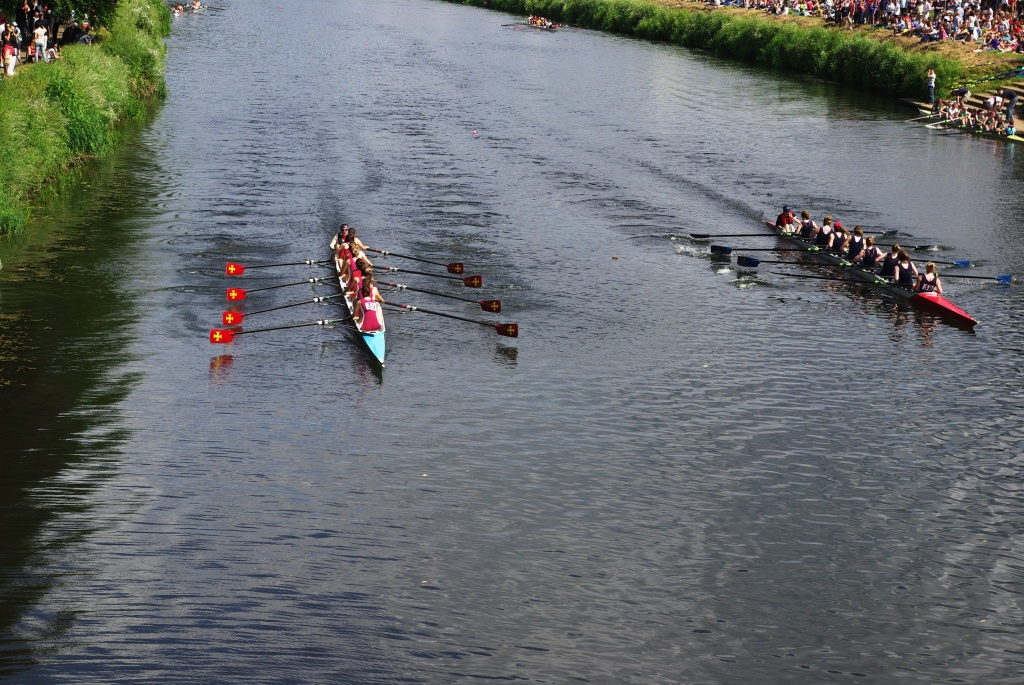
St. John's College Boat Club racing
