= Ruth Etchells =

English poet, literary scholar and churchwoman

Ruth Etchells DD

Principal of St John's College, Durham
- In office 1978–1988
- Preceded by: John Cockerton
- Succeeded by: Anthony Thiselton

Personal details
- Born: Dorothea Ruth Etchells; 17 April 1931
- Died: 8 August 2012 (aged 81)
- Citizenship: United Kingdom

Dorothea Ruth Etchells (17 April 1931 – 8 August 2012) was an English poet and college principal who spent most of her working life in the University of Durham.

== Early life ==
She was born on 17 April 1931. She attended Merchant Taylors’ School and the University of Liverpool. After graduation, she became an English teacher at Aigburth Vale High School in Liverpool and then a lecturer at the Chester College of Higher Education.

== Career ==
From 1968, she taught in the English Department and soon became Vice Principal of Trevelyan College. In 1979 she was appointed Principal of St John's College, Durham, a notable appointment because this made her both the first lay person and the first woman to be principal of a Church of England college, Cranmer Hall (part of St. John's), that trains clergy, who were in those days only male.

She was a member of the Church of England's Crown Appointments Commission that recommends appointments of the bishops and archbishops, including the Archbishop of Canterbury. In 1992 she was awarded a Lambeth Doctor of Divinity degree.

== Bibliography ==
Her many books include:

- Unafraid to be: A Christian Study of Contemporary English Writing. IVP. 1969. ISBN 978-0851103440.
- George Herbert (Poets & Prophets). Lion. 1998. ISBN 978-0745913865.
- Robert Browning (Poets & Prophets). Lion. 1988. ISBN 978-0745912837.
- A Reading of the Parables of Jesus. Darton, Longman and Todd. 1198. ISBN 978-0232521894.
- Safer Than a Known Way. SPCK. 2006. ISBN 978-0281057856.

== Poems ==
- Ballad of the Judas Tree
