= Dawson Dawson-Walker =

British clergyman, classicist, theologian, and academic

The Reverend D. Dawson-Walker
- Principal of St John's College, Durham
- Church: Church of England
- In office: 1911–1919
- Predecessor: Sidney Nowell Rostron
- Successor: C. S. Wallis
- Other post: Canon Residentiary of Durham Cathedral (1919–1934)

Orders
- Ordination: 1894 by William Boyd Carpenter

Personal details
- Born: Dawson Walker; 20 December 1868 Bradford, Yorkshire, England
- Died: 28 February 1934 (aged 65) Durham, County Durham, England
- Denomination: Anglicanism (previously Wesleyan Methodism)
- Spouse: Mary Featherston
- Children: Three
- Profession: Clergyman and academic
- Education: Bradford Grammar School; Corpus Christi College, Oxford

Dawson Dawson-Walker (20 December 1868 – 28 January 1934) was a British Church of England clergyman, classicist, theologian and academic. From 1911 to 1919, he was Principal of St John's College, Durham. From 1919 to his death in 1934, he was Van Mildert Professor of Divinity at Durham University and a Canon Residentiary of Durham Cathedral.

== Early life and education ==
Dawson-Walker was born on 20 December 1868 to Richard Felvus Walker. His family were Wesleyan Methodists and he was brought up in this denomination of Christianity. He was educated at Bradford Grammar School, a private school in Bradford, Yorkshire. Having been awarded a scholarship, he studied classics at Corpus Christi College, Oxford. He was awarded a first class in the Honour Moderations in 1889 and a second class in Literae Humaniores in 1891. He therefore graduated from the University of Oxford with a Bachelor of Arts (BA) degree in 1891. It was during his degree, that he moved from Methodism to Anglicanism.

In 1901, he completed a Bachelor of Divinity (BD) degree from Oxford. In 1905, he completed a Doctor of Divinity (DD) degree from Oxford and was awarded a DD ad eundem by Durham University.

== Career ==
In 1894, Dawson-Walker was ordained in the Church of England at Ripon Cathedral by William Boyd Carpenter, Bishop of Ripon. He served his curacy at Bradford Parish Church in Bradford, Yorkshire. He then joined Durham University as a lecturer in classics. In 1898, he was appointed a tutor in theology. In 1901, he became a chaplain at County Hospital, Durham and censor of St Cuthbert's Society, Durham. In 1909, he was appointed Examining Chaplain for ordination candidates in the Diocese of Durham.

From 1910 to 1919, he was Professor of Biblical Exegesis at Durham University. From 1911 to 1919, he was additionally Principal of St John's College, Durham. In 1918, he became chaplain to the Corporation of Durham. He maintained a personal interest in the development of his students during and after his time as principal.

In 1919, he was appointed Van Mildert Professor of Divinity at Durham University and a Canon Residentiary of Durham Cathedral. These two appointments and his chaplaincy of the Corporation of Durham, meant that he crossed community boundaries and connected town, gown and the clergy.

== Personal life ==
Dawson-Walker fell within the Evangelical tradition of the Anglican church.

In 1899, he married Mary Maud Jane Featherston. Together, they had three sons.

== Selected works ==
- Dawson-Walker, D. The Pauline view of the Atonement.
- Dawson-Walker, D. (1906). The gift of tongues and other essays. Edinburgh: T. & T. Clark.
- Dawson-Walker, D. (1926). The epistle to the Colossians and the epistle to Titus. London: Religious Tract Society.
- Dawson-Walker, D. (1927). The second epistle of St Peter, the second and third epistles of St John and the epistle of St Jude. London: Religious Tract Society.
- Dawson-Walker, D. (1929). "The Pauline View of the Atonement". In Grensted, L. W. (ed.). The Atonement in History And in Life. Society for Promoting Christian Knowledge.

Academic offices
Preceded by Sidney Nowell Rostron	Principal of St John's College, Durham; 1911–1919	Succeeded by C. S. Wallis
