= Malcolm Miller (tour guide) =

British historian and tour guide

Malcolm Bruce Miller (born 1933) is a British historian and professional tour guide. An expert on the history and iconography of Chartres Cathedral, his association with the cathedral as a guide has spanned more than six decades.

== Early life and education ==
Miller studied French at Durham University and graduated with a BA in 1958 as a member of St Cuthbert's Society. His degree included an academic year in Chartres, during which he taught English at a local school and began studying Chartres Cathedral.

== Career ==
Miller became an authorised guide to Chartres Cathedral in 1958. Although he initially also worked as a teacher elsewhere in France, he continued to return to Chartres each Easter and summer vacation to work as a guide. In 1968, following several months recuperating from a serious illness in England, he decided to dedicate the rest of his life to the study and interpretation of the cathedral.

Miller became particularly associated with the interpretation of the cathedral's medieval iconography, including its stained glass and sculpture. A 1982 profile in the New York Times detailed his active schedule during the tourist season: two 90-minute tours per day, seven days a week. By 1986, he had written three books on Chartres and completed a six-part British television series on medieval stained glass. He has also lectured internationally, including tours in the United States from 1972.

In 2008, Miller marked fifty years as an authorised guide at Chartres Cathedral. He continued his association with the cathedral into his late eighties; in September 2023, the American Friends of Chartres reported that visitors had spent time with Miller and noted that he was then approaching his 90th birthday.

Miller was a co-founder of the Friends of Chartres and has received French honours for his work relating to the cathedral.

== Selected publications ==
- Miller, Malcolm (1980). Chartres Cathedral: The Medieval Stained Glass and Sculpture. London: Pitkin Pictorials. ISBN 9780853722700.
- ——— (1996). Chartres Cathedral (2nd ed.). Andover: Pitkin. ISBN 9780853727927.
