= Bishop of Leicester =

Diocesan bishop in the Church of England

- Bishopric

Anglican
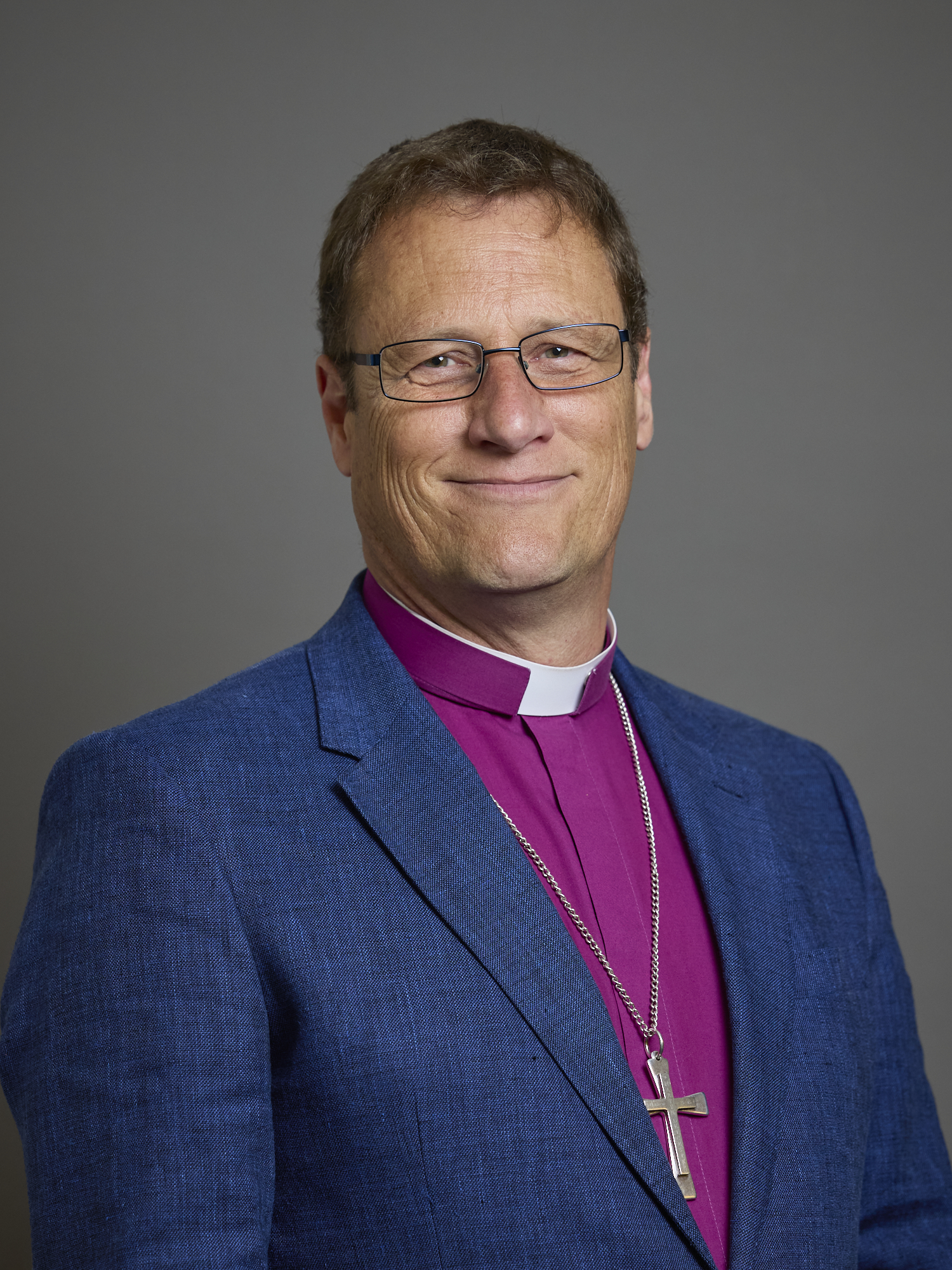
- The Rt. Reverend Martyn Snow

- Arms of the Diocese of Leicester
- Incumbent; Martyn Snow

Location
- Ecclesiastical province: Canterbury
- Residence: Bishop's Lodge, Knighton

Information
- First holder: Cyril Bardsley
- Established: 1927
- Diocese: Leicester
- Cathedral: Leicester Cathedral

The Bishop of Leicester is the Ordinary of the Diocese of Leicester in the Province of Canterbury of the Church of England.

Through reorganisation within the Church of England, the Diocese of Leicester was refounded in 1927, and St Martin's Church became Leicester Cathedral. The present bishop's residence is Bishop's Lodge, Knighton, south Leicester. Martyn Snow became Bishop of Leicester with the confirmation of his election on 22 February 2016.

== Bishops of Leicester ==
Bishops of Leicester
From	Until	Incumbent	Notes
1927	1940	Cyril Bardsley	Translated from Peterborough
1940	1953	Vernon Smith	Translated from Willesden
1953	1979	Ronald Williams	
1979	1991	Richard Rutt	Translated from St Germans. Converted to Roman Catholicism in 1995.
1991	1999	Tom Butler	Translated from Willesden; later moved to Southwark
1999	11 July 2015	Tim Stevens	Translated from Dunwich
1 September 2015	22 February 2016	John Holbrook	Bishop of Brixworth, acting bishop
22 February 2016	present	Martyn Snow	Previously Bishop of Tewkesbury.

== Assistant bishops ==
Other assistant (or coadjutor) bishops of the diocese include:

- 1935 – 1949 (ret.): John Willis, former Bishop of Uganda
- 1949 – 1955 (d.): Francis Hollis, Vicar of Stanford with Swinford, Leicestershire and Senior Canon of Leicester; former Bishop of Labuan and Sarawak
- 1950 – 1965 (ret.): Alexander Maxwell, Vicar of Copt Oak (until 1952), of Ab Kettleby with Wartnaby and Holwell (1952–1959), Rector of Swithland (from 1959); former Assistant Bishop of West/ern Szechwan. Harold Alexander Maxwell (17 December 1897 – 30 December 1975), CMS missionary in China. Made deacon on St Thomas' Day (21 December) 1923 and ordained priest the following St Thomas' Day, 21 December 1924; both times by, Albert David, Bishop of Liverpool, at Liverpool Cathedral.
- 1972 – 1997 (d.): John Mort, former Bishop of Northern Nigeria (1952–1969), Canon Treasurer of Leicester Cathedral (1970–1988)
- 1966 – 1973 (ret.): Geoffrey Stuart Smith, Rector of Swithland, former Bishop of North Kerala and Assistant Bishop of Chelmsford

Cecil de Carteret, former Bishop of Jamaica, was appointed to serve as assistant-bishop from 1932, but he died in ill-health on 3 January, unable to take up the appointment.

Honorary assistant bishops — retired bishops taking on occasional duties voluntarily — have included:

- 1999–2011 (res.): Colin Scott, retired Bishop of Hulme

== Sources ==
Notes

Bibliography

- Fryde, E. B.; Greenway, D. E.; Porter, S.; Roy, I., eds. (1986). Handbook of British Chronology (3rd, reprinted 2003 ed.). Cambridge: Cambridge University Press. ISBN 0-521-56350-X.
