= Cranmer Hall, Durham =

Church of England college

Coordinates: 54°46′20″N 1°34′32″W

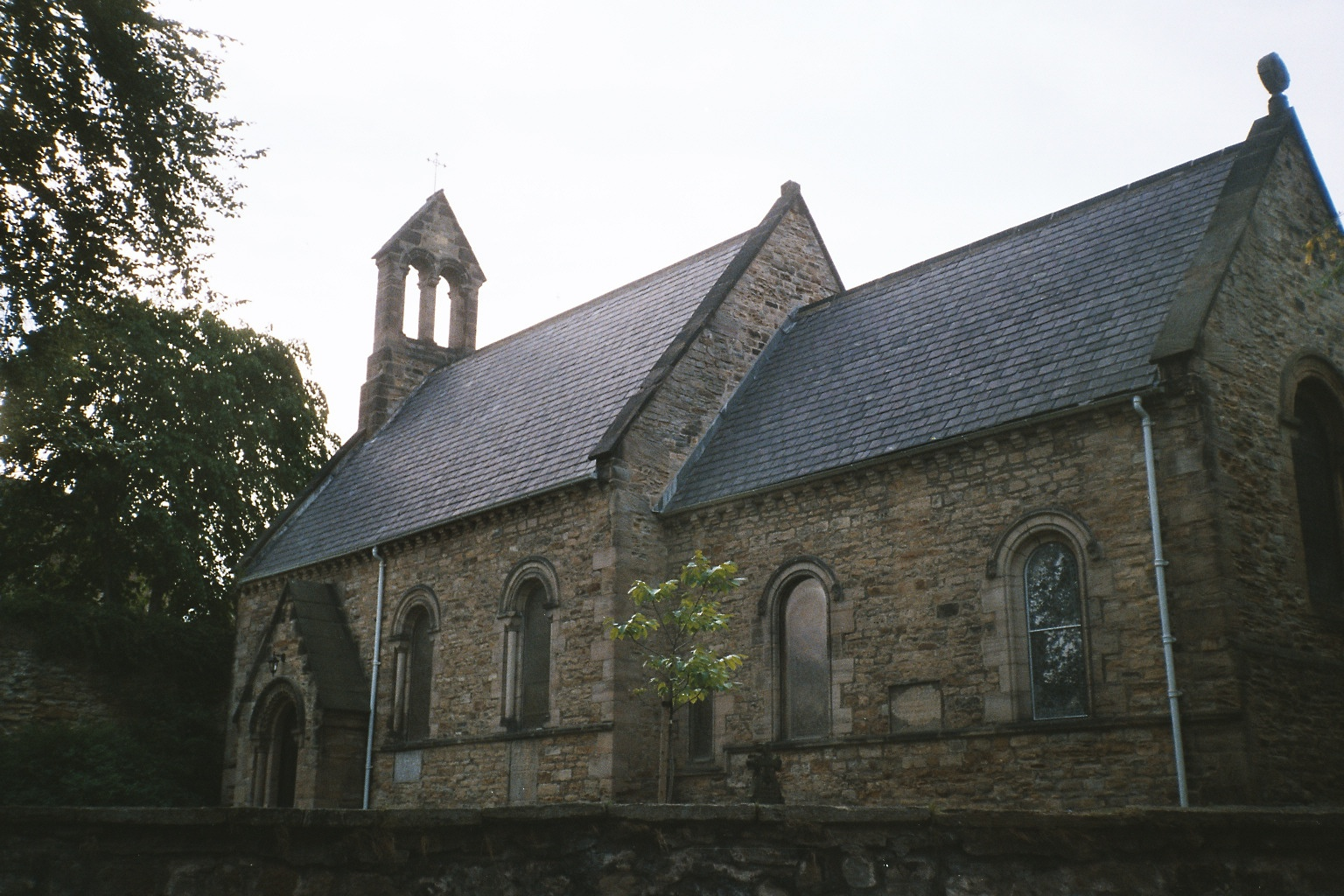
Chapel of St John's College, Durham

Cranmer Hall is a Church of England theological college based at Durham, England. Cranmer Hall forms part of St John's College, Durham which is a recognised college of Durham University. It stands in the Open Evangelical tradition.

Cranmer Hall currently trains ordinands for the Church of England and the wider Anglican Communion.

== History ==
The college is named after Thomas Cranmer, Archbishop of Canterbury during the reign of Henry VIII.

St John's College, of which Cranmer is one of the two constituent halls, was established in 1909. Having become part of Durham University in 1919, the college was formally divided into the two halls in 1958. Cranmer Hall, the theological training institution and the non-theological John's Hall.

== Diversification ==
The Wesley Study Centre, named after John Wesley, formerly trained ministers for the Methodist Church of Great Britain, but now focuses on postgraduate research.

In October 2015, the college accepted the first students on its Free Church Track, training leaders for churches outside of the Church of England. In October 2016, the college began to train students for Baptist ministry via an alliance with Northern Baptist College, Manchester.

== Notable members of staff ==
- Calvin T. Samuel, Academic Dean and Director of the Wesley Study Centre
- Michael Volland, Director of Mission (2009–2015)

=== List of wardens ===
The head of Cranmer Hall is the warden.

- 1968–1970: John C. P. Cockerton (formerly Chaplain to Cranmer Hall)
- 1971–1979: Timothy Yeats
- 1979–1983: Christopher Byworth
- 1983–1992: Ian Cundy
- 1993–1996: John Pritchard
- 1996–2004: Steven Croft
- 2005–2011: Anne Dyer
- 2011–2016: Mark Tanner
- 2017–2023: Philip Plyming
- 2023–present: Nicholas Moore

== Notable alumni ==
- Arun Arora, Bishop of Kirkstall, former Director of Communications of the Church of England
- Angela Berners-Wilson, first woman ordained a priest in the Church of England
- Steven Croft, Bishop of Oxford
- Chris Edmondson, Bishop of Bolton
- Michael Gear, former Bishop of Doncaster
- John Gladwin, former Bishop of Chelmsford
- Libby Lane, Bishop of Stockport, first woman consecrated a Church of England bishop
- Geoff Pearson, Bishop of Lancaster
- Robert Paterson, Bishop of Sodor and Man
- Joanna Penberthy, first woman consecrated a Church in Wales bishop
- John Saxbee, former Bishop of Lincoln
- Keith Sinclair, Bishop of Birkenhead
- Michael Turnbull, Bishop of Durham (1994–2003)
- Richard Turnbull, Principal of Wycliffe Hall, Oxford
- Justin Welby, former Archbishop of Canterbury
- Mark Tanner, Bishop of Berwick
