= Cyril Bardsley =

British Anglican bishop (1870–1940)

- Bishop of Leicester
- Bardsley in the 1920s
- Diocese: Diocese of Leicester
- In office: 1927–1940
- Successor: Vernon Smith
- Other post: Bishop of Peterborough (1924–1927)

Personal details
- Born: 13 February 1870 Greenwich, London
- Died: 20 December 1940 (aged 70) Tunbridge Wells, Kent, United Kingdom
- Denomination: Anglican
- Education: Marlborough College, New College

Cyril Charles Bowman Bardsley (13 February 1870 – 20 December 1940) was an Anglican bishop in the first half of the 20th century. Bardsley was educated at Marlborough College and New College, Oxford and ordained in 1895. His first post was as a curate at Huddersfield Parish Church. He then held incumbencies at Nottingham and St Helen's, Merseyside. He then became the secretary of the Church Missionary Society until his ordination to the episcopate as the Bishop of Peterborough in 1924. In 1927, he was translated to be the first diocesan Bishop of Leicester in the modern era. Described in his Times obituary as "a pastoral Bishop who lived for nothing but to serve his Master and minister to his people", he died shortly after resigning his see in Tunbridge Wells.

His nephew was Cuthbert Bardsley, who was Suffragan Bishop of Croydon from 1947 to 1956, and Bishop of Coventry from 1956 till 1976. He was also related to John Bardsley, Bishop of Sodor and Man from 1887 to 1891, and Bishop of Carlisle from 1891 to 1914.

Church of England titles
Preceded by Theodore Woods	Bishop of Peterborough; 1924–1927	Succeeded by Claude Blagden
New title	Bishop of Leicester; 1927–1940	Succeeded by Vernon Smith
