= John Cockerton =

The Reverend Canon John Cockerton
- Principal of St John's College, Durham
- Cockerton in undated photo
- Church: Church of England
- In office: 1970–1978
- Predecessor: Jim P. Hickinbotham
- Successor: Ruth Etchells
- Other post: Warden of Cranmer Hall (1968-1970)

Orders
- Ordination: 1954 (deacon); 1955 (priest)

Personal details
- Born: John Clifford Penn Cockerton; 1927
- Died: 9 December 2015 (aged 87–88)
- Education: University of Liverpool; Wycliffe Hall, Oxford; St Catherine's Society, Oxford

John Clifford Penn Cockerton (1927 – 9 December 2015) was a British Anglican priest and academic. He was Warden of Cranmer Hall, an Anglican theological college, from 1968 to 1970, and was Principal of St John's College, Durham from 1970 to 1978.

== Early life ==
Cockerton studied at the University of Liverpool and graduated with a Bachelor of Arts (BA) degree in 1948. In 1951, he entered Wycliffe Hall, Oxford to train for ordained ministry. He additionally studied theology at St Catherine's Society, Oxford, graduating in 1954 with a BA degree; as per tradition, his BA was promoted to a Master of Arts (MA (Oxon)) degree in 1958.

== Ordained ministry ==
Cockerton was ordained in the Church of England as a deacon in 1954 and as a priest in 1955. From 1954 to 1958, he served his curacy at St Helen's Church, St Helens, Merseyside.

In 1958, he moved to Durham where he would spend the next 20 years. From 1958 to 1960, he was a tutor at Cranmer Hall, an Evangelical Anglican theological college that is part of St John's College, Durham. From 1960 to 1963, he served as chaplain to the students and staff of Cranmer Hall. In 1963, he was appointed Vice-Principal of St John's College, Durham, and in 1968, he was additionally appointed Warden of Cranmer Hall. From 1970 to 1978, he was Principal of St John's College. During his time as head of the college, St John's became the first male college of the University of Durham to become mixed when it admitted female undergraduates in October 1973.

In 1978, he left academia to return to parish ministry. From 1978 to 1985, he was Rector of Wheldrake, York. From 1985 to 1992, he was Rector of the successor parish, Wheldrake with Thorganby. In 1987, he was appointed an honorary canon of York Minster.

On 30 September 1992, he retired from full-time ministry. He was then appointed Canon Emeritus. From 1998 to his death in 2015, he had permission to officiate in the Diocese of York.

Cockerton died on 9 December 2015. His funeral was held at All Saints' Church, Upper Poppleton, York.
