= Dean of Portsmouth =

Church of England senior clergy member

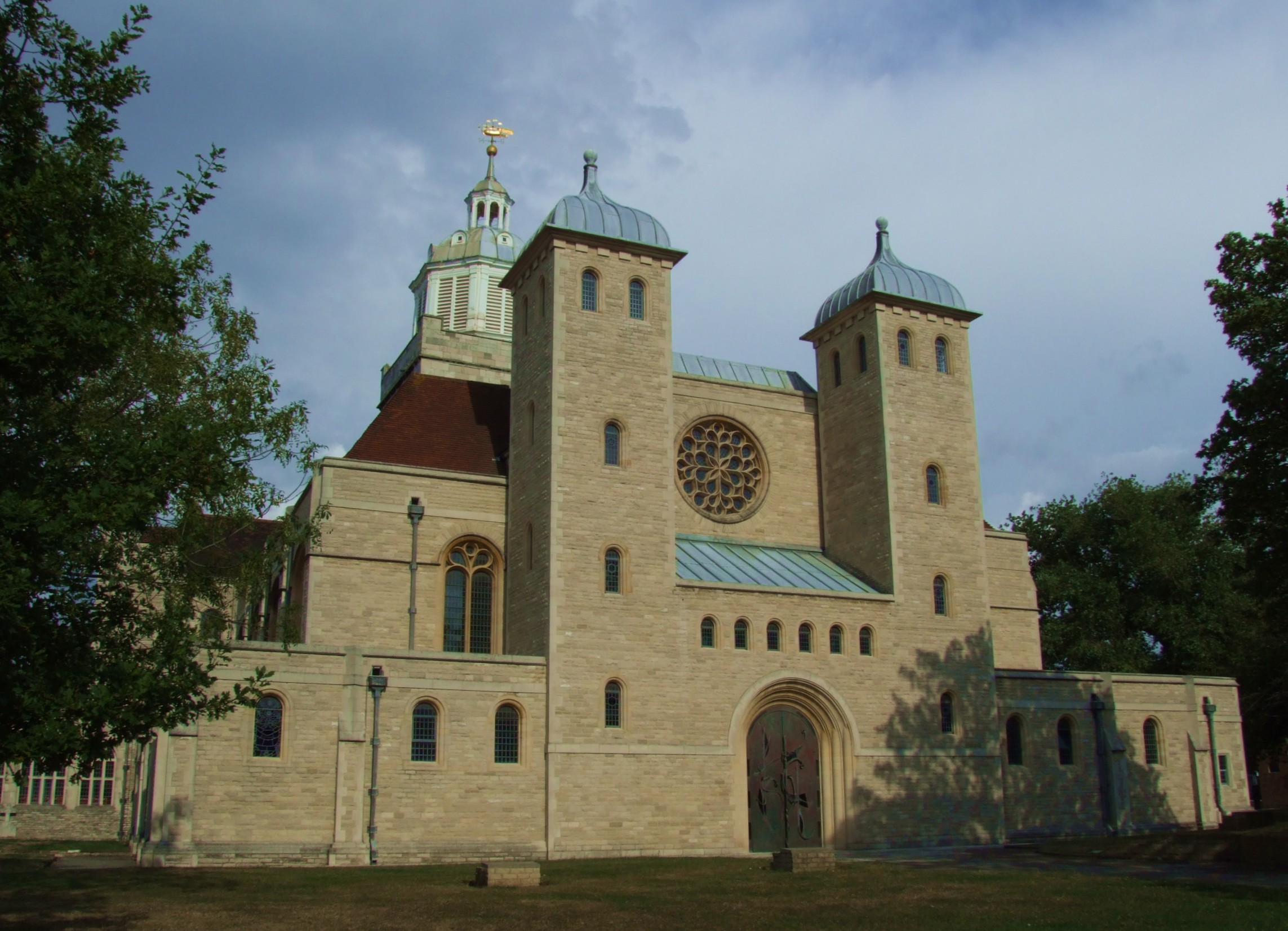
Portsmouth Cathedral

The Dean of Portsmouth is the head (primus inter pares – first among equals) and chair of the chapter of canons, the ruling body of Portsmouth Cathedral. The dean and chapter are based at the Cathedral Church of Saint Thomas of Canterbury in Portsmouth. Before 2000 the post was designated as a provost, which was then the equivalent of a dean at most English cathedrals. The cathedral is the mother church of the Anglican Diocese of Portsmouth and seat of the Bishop of Portsmouth. The current dean is the Very Revd Dr Anthony Cane.

== List of deans ==
=== Provosts ===
- 1927–1930 Bernard Williams
- 1930–1938 Thomas Masters
- 1939–1972 Eric Porter Goff
- 1972–1982 Michael Nott
- 1982–1993 David Stancliffe
- 1994–1999 Michael Yorke
- 2000–2000 William Taylor (became Dean)

=== Deans ===
- 2000–2002 William Taylor
- 2002 – 10 June 2018 (ret.) David Brindley
- 2018–2019 Peter Leonard (Acting)
- 16 March 2019 – present Anthony Cane
