= St Nicholas Church, Fleetwood =

Coordinates: 53.9187°N 3.0300°W

Church of St Nicholas, Fleetwood
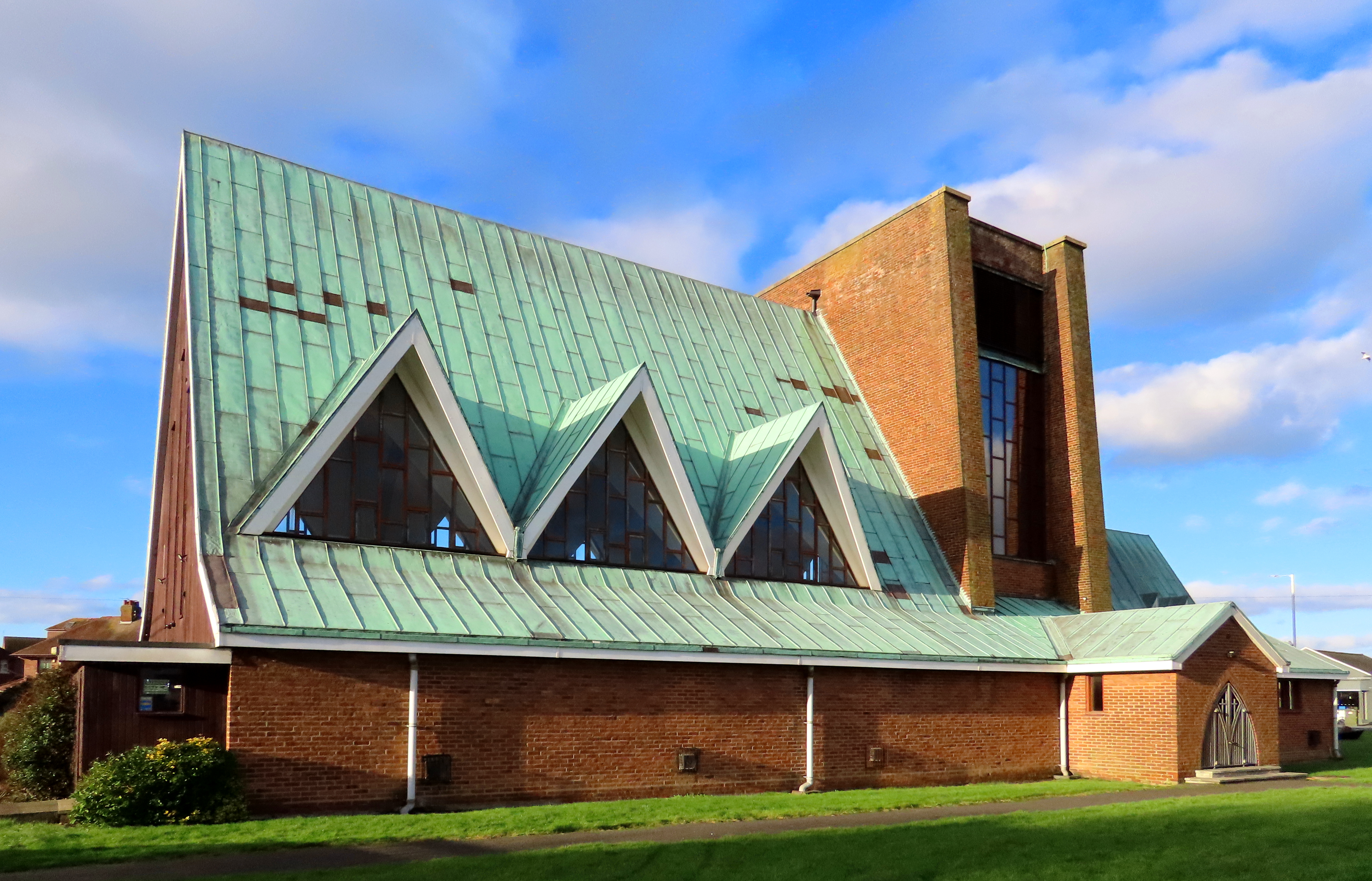
- St Nicholas Church from the south-east

- Location in Fleetwood
- OS grid reference: SD 32440 47436
- Location: Fleetwood, Lancashire
- Country: England
- Denomination: Anglican
- Website: achurchnearyou.com

History
- Dedicated: 1962
- Consecrated: 1987

Architecture
- Functional status: Active
- Heritage designation: Grade II listed
- Designated: 1 November 2023
- Architect: Laurence King
- Groundbreaking: 1960
- Completed: 1962

Administration
- Province: York
- Diocese: Blackburn
- Archdeaconry: Lancaster
- Deanery: Poulton
- Parish: Fleetwood St. Nicholas

Clergy
- Bishop: Bishop of Blackburn
- Vicar: Rev'd Carolyn Leitch

St Nicholas Church, Fleetwood is a Church of England parish church serving the town of Fleetwood in Lancashire. It was designed by the architect Laurence King and constructed between 1960 and 1962. It was Grade II listed by Historic England in 2023, recognised for its "bold, impressive and sculptural structural design in the form of an upturned boat".

== History ==
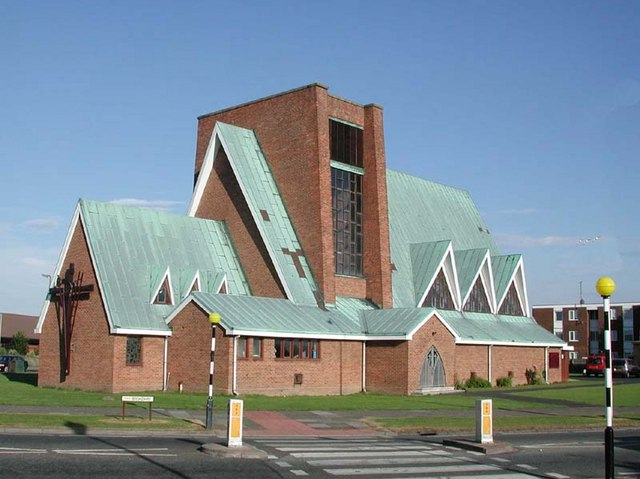
St Nicholas Church viewed from the north-west

The town of Fleetwood, a coastal settlement in the Borough of Wyre at the northwest corner of the Fylde, acquired its current character when it was developed as a resort in the 1830s by landowner Sir Peter Hesketh-Fleetwood. A parish church serving the town, dedicated to St Peter, was completed in 1841 to a design by the architect Decimus Burton.

A daughter church to the parish church of St Peter was established in 1908, when a modest chapel dedicated to St Nicholas, patron saint of sailors, was constructed on Wyre Street, close to the site of the present building, in an area prone to flooding. This building was washed away in the devastating floods that struck Fleetwood in October 1927. In the 1930s a new site was acquired and a timber-framed mission hall was constructed to replace the lost building until funds for a more permanent church were available. Relocated prior to construction of the present church, the mission hall would survive in part until 2007 as a scout hut.

In 1960 construction began on a new church designed by the London-based ecclesiastical architect Laurence King, who at the time was engaged on the expansion of Blackburn Cathedral, the seat of the diocese in which Fleetwood is part. In October 1960 the foundation stone was laid by Nicholas Meynell and the site was hallowed by Charles Claxton, Bishop of Blackburn. Construction was undertaken by the firm of Brown & Jackson Ltd. Although never fully completed, the church was dedicated by Anthony Hoskyns-Abrahall, Bishop of Lancaster, in April 1962.

The building was only consecrated in 1987 when the parish of St Nicholas was formally created though division of the existing parish of St Peter, Fleetwood.

The Reverend Carolyn Leitch took up the incumbency of the parish of St Nicholas, Fleetwood in July 2019.

On 1 November 2023, the church, with its fixtures and fittings, was designated as a Grade II listed building by Historic England, noted for its architectural interest and for being a rare example in the north of England of the work of King.

In April 2025 the parish of St Nicholas was awarded a grant of £30,000 by the National Churches Trust for repairs to the church caused by water ingress and damaged brickwork, which had been worsened by its exposed coastal location.

== Architecture ==
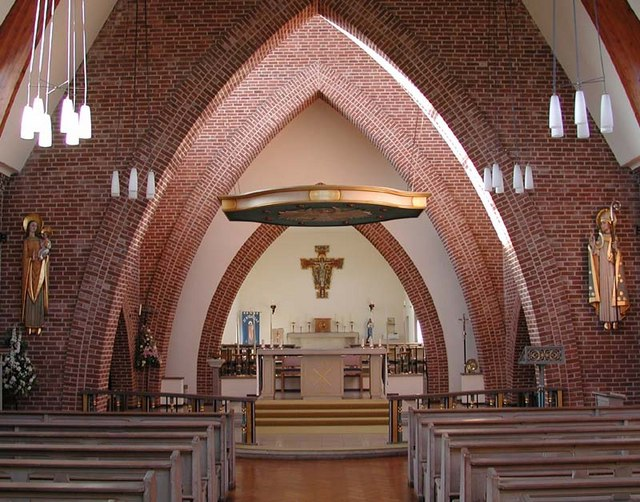
Interior view of the sanctuary from the nave

St Nicholas stands on a triangular plot of land at the intersection of Poulton Road, Highbury Avenue and Broadway. The north-south orientation of the church means that the congregation faces north towards the altar rather than east, as is conventional. Whilst modern in appearance, it is traditional in form, comprising a central tower, nave, chancel, porches, and vestry rooms. King's design was intended to resemble the upturned keel of a ship - the Ark of Salvation - reflecting the seafaring aspects both of the town and St Nicholas himself.

The external construction of the church is largely of light brown brick. There is no stone or concrete used anywhere. A series of steeply pitched copper roofs, whose green patina contrasts with the orange-brown brickwork rise above. The large square central tower consists of two, tall tapering brick slabs to the north and south, and flat recessed plain-glass windows on the east and west. The nave and chancel roofs are very steeply pitched, but the nave roof is considerably higher, extending over the aisles. Each of the roofs has three sharply pitched dormer windows on each side, those on the chancel being smaller than those on the nave. The overall effect is intended to be reminiscent of the sails of a ship.

The windowless north-facing façade has attached to it a large wooden Cross superimposed with the Instruments of the Passion. The south-facing facade is clad with timber slat boards with a portico below. This was not part of King's original plan and was installed when funds became limited. While the intention was to complete the building at a later date, the western bays envisaged by King have never been built.

While the exterior is sharply angular, the interior is characterised by curving Gothic arches. Construction is of the same light-brown brick as the exterior, although contrasted with pale stone dressings. The sanctuary and altar are positioned centrally beneath tower, raised on a two-step plinth. This format, unusual for the period, is evidence of the growing influence of the Liturgical Movement, which advocated for the congregation to be closer to, and more directly engaged with, the liturgy. King regularly applied these principals to both his new church buildings and renovations, including at Blackburn Cathedral.

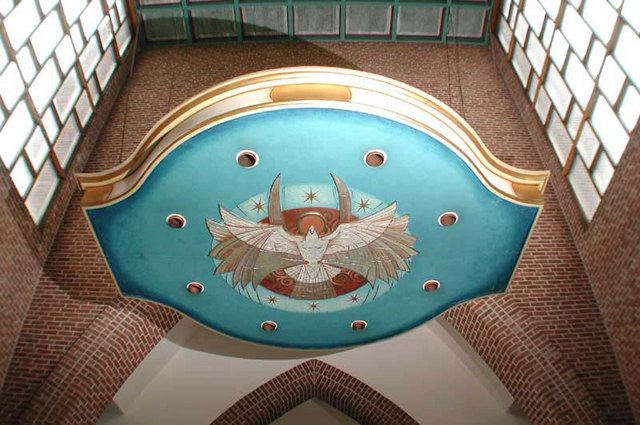
The tester hanging above the altar

The positioning of the altar meant that the chancel could be repurposed as a Lady chapel. It has a stained glass window with an abstract patten to each of the side walls; the only coloured glass installed in the church. King was also responsible for designing the majority of the church's furniture, fixtures and fittings. Above the altar hangs a large polychrome tester with an image of a dove, representing the Holy Spirit, on its underside. King also designed three carved polychrome sculptures for the church. Either side of the crossing hangs representations of the Madonna and St Nicholas. The third, a Crucifix, is in the chancel. To either side of the crossing is a port and starboard light placed the opposite way around to reflect an overturned ship.

Centrally placed on the west wall is the organ, installed in 1961. A 2 manual and pedal pipe organ, the instrument is thought to be last to be built by the Leeds-based firm established by James Jepson Binns. A 5 rank extension organ, it has 4 ranks totally enclosed in a swell box and the 5th rank, a diapason, on display to the side and above the console.
