= Geoff Pearson =

British Anglican bishop (born 1951)

The Right Reverend Geoff Pearson
- Bishop of Lancaster
- Church: Church of England
- Diocese: Diocese of Blackburn
- In office: 2006–2017
- Predecessor: Stephen Pedley
- Successor: Jill Duff

Orders
- Ordination: 1974 (deacon); 1975 (priest) by Eric Treacy (priest)
- Consecration: 2 November 2006

Personal details
- Born: 18 July 1951 (age 75)
- Denomination: Anglican
- Residence: Forton, Lancashire
- Spouse: Jean (m. 1973)
- Children: three
- Education: St John's College, Durham

Geoffrey Seagrave Pearson (born 18 July 1951) is a British Anglican bishop, a retired Bishop of Lancaster in the Church of England Diocese of Blackburn.

== Early life and education ==
Pearson was educated at St John's College, Durham, gaining his Bachelor of Arts (BA) degree in 1972, and then trained for the ministry at Cranmer Hall, Durham (part of St John's).

== Ordained ministry ==
He was made a deacon in 1974 and ordained a priest at Petertide 1975 (29 June), by Eric Treacy, Bishop of Wakefield, at Wakefield Cathedral, serving his title (curacy) at Kirkheaton, West Yorkshire (1974–1977). He then became curate-in-charge (1977–1982) and then incumbent (1982–1985) at the Church of the Redeemer, Blackburn, before taking up an appointment as Assistant Home Secretary for the General Board for Mission and Unity (1985–1989, during which time he was also licensed as an honorary curate at Forty Hill, London) and Executive Secretary for the British Council of Churches' Evangelism Committee (from 1986). Finally (before his appointment to the episcopate) he moved to Merseyside to be Vicar of Roby, during which time he was also Area Dean of Huyton (from 2002) and an honorary canon of Liverpool Cathedral (from 2003).

=== Episcopal ministry ===
Pearson was appointed Bishop of Lancaster — a suffragan bishop in the Diocese of Blackburn — in 2006, took up his see with his consecration as a bishop on 2 November 2006 and was installed not long after at Blackburn Cathedral. He has dedicated much of his ministry to the prioritisation of gospel work amongst children and young people. A keen hillwalker, Pearson married in 1973 and they now have three adult children.

On 16 January 2017, it was announced that Pearson was to retire at the end of July 2017.

== Personal life ==
In 1973, Pearson married Jean Richardson. He has three children; one son and two daughters.

== Styles ==
- The Reverend Geoff Pearson (1974–2003)
- The Reverend Canon Geoff Pearson (2003–2006)
- The Right Reverend Geoff Pearson (2006–present)

Church of England titles
Preceded by Stephen Pedley	Bishop of Lancaster; 2006–2017	Succeeded by Jill Duff
