= David Brindley =

English priest (born 1953)

David Charles Brindley AKC (born 11 June 1953, Wednesbury, West Midlands) is a retired Church of England priest and the most recent Dean of Portsmouth.

Brindley was educated at Wednesfield Grammar School and at King's College London. After VSO in Lebanon he studied for the priesthood at St Augustine's College, Canterbury and was ordained in 1977. He was a curate at Epping and then a lecturer at the College of St. Paul and St. Mary, Cheltenham.

After this he was Vicar of Quorn from 1982 to 1986, and then Principal of the West of England Ministerial Training Course until becoming Team Rector of Warwick, a post he held until his current appointment.

He was collated, inducted and installed Dean of Portsmouth at Portsmouth Cathedral on 16 November 2002. He retired effective 10 June 2018.
