= William Taylor (Dean of Portsmouth) =

English Anglican priest (1956–2026)

William Henry Taylor (23 December 1956 – 7 July 2026) was an English Anglican priest. He was the last provost (and first dean) of Portsmouth Cathedral.

== Biography ==
William Henry Taylor was born in 1956 and educated at the University of Kent and the universities of Tübingen, Lancaster and London, from where he was awarded a PhD (SOAS) in Ottoman Syriac studies. He was ordained in 1984 and began his career as assistant curate at All Saints' Canterbury. After this he was the Archbishop of Canterbury's Advisor on Orthodox Affairs at Lambeth Palace and then senior curate]at All Saints, Margaret Street, Westminster. He was a Church Mission Society chaplain in Jordan from 198 to 1991 and then vicar of St Peter's Church, Ealing, and Area Dean of Ealing (1993-98).

From 2000 to 2002 he was the provost (subsequently the dean) of Portsmouth Cathedral.

From 2002, he was the vicar of St John's, Notting Hill, and chairman of the Anglican and Eastern Churches Association. He was a director of Jerusalem and the Middle East Church Association (JMECA) and a Freeman of the City of London.

Taylor died at Guy's Hospital in Southwark, London, on 7 July 2026 aged 69.

== Bibliography ==
- Christians in the Holy Land (1994) ISBN 0905035321
- Antioch and Canterbury: The Syrian Orthodox Church and the Church of England (1874-1928) (Gorgias Press)

== Notes ==
Church of England titles
Preceded by Michael Leslie Yorke	Provost of Portsmouth Cathedral; Dean of Portsmouth Cathedral; 2000–2002	Succeeded by David Charles Brindley
