= Michael Yorke =

Anglican priest (1939–2019)

Michael Leslie Yorke (25 March 1939 – 19 April 2019) was an Anglican priest in the last decades of the 20th century and the first years of the 21st. He was born on 25 March 1939 and educated at Midhurst Grammar School and Magdalene College, Cambridge. Ordained in 1965 his first post was a curacy at Croydon Parish Church after which he served as Succentor, Precentor and Chaplain at Chelmsford Cathedral. Following this he was Rector of Hadstock, a Canon Residentiary at Chelmsford Cathedral, Vicar of St Margaret's with St Nicholas, King's Lynn and Provost of Portsmouth Cathedral. In 1999 he became Dean of Lichfield, and was Dean Emeritus in retirement.

He died on 19 April 2019 at the age of 80.

== Notes ==
Church of England titles
Preceded by David Staffurth Stancliffe	Provost of Portsmouth; 1994–1999	Succeeded by William Henry Taylor
Preceded by Nicholas Thomas Wright	Dean of Lichfield; 1999–2005	Succeeded by Adrian John Dorber
