= St Peter's Church, Stockton-on-Tees =

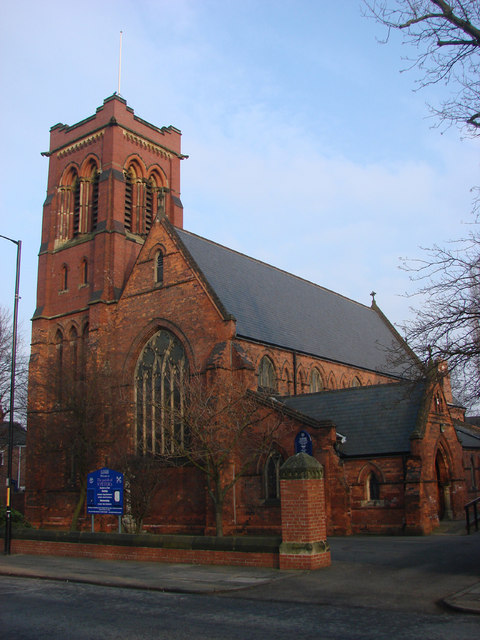
- St Peter's Church, Stockton-on-Tees
- 54°33′25″N 1°19′25″W
- OS grid reference: NZ 43861 18186
- Location: Yarm Road, Stockton-on-Tees, County Durham, TS18 3PJ
- Country: England
- Denomination: Church of England
- Churchmanship: Liberal Catholic

History
- Status: Active

Architecture
- Functional status: Parish church
- Heritage designation: Grade II*

Administration
- Diocese: Diocese of Durham
- Archdeaconry: Archdeaconry of Auckland
- Deanery: Stockton
- Parish: St. Peter Stockton-upon-Tees

Clergy
- Vicar: William Braviner

St Peter's Church is a Church of England parish church in Stockton-on-Tees, County Durham. The church is a grade II* listed building.

== History ==
In 1875, the parish was carved out of the parish of Holy Trinity Church, Stockton-on-Tees. The original church was built of wood and stone. The current church was built from 1880 to 1881, and is constructed from red brick with stone dressings. It was consecrated on 13 October 1881.

The church was designated a grade II* listed building on 19 January 1951.

== Present day ==
St Peter's Church is combined with All Saints Church, Hartburn to form the benefice of Stockton St Peter in the Diocese of Durham.

St Peter's stands in the liberal catholic tradition of the Church of England.

== Notable clergy ==
- Mark Bonney, later Dean of Ely, served his curacy here.
- Ken Good, later Archdeacon of Richmond, served his curacy here.
- David Hawtin, later Bishop of Repton
- Nigel Stock, later Bishop of Stockport, Bishop of St Edmundsbury and Ipswich, and Bishop at Lambeth, served his curacy here.

=== List of vicars ===
- 1875 to 1905: Henry Wodeman
- 1959 to 1970: Wilfrid Widdas Tymms
- 1970 to 1977: Tony Dumper, later Bishop of Dudley
- 1977 to 1988: Stephen Pedley, later Bishop of Lancaster
- 1989 to 2000: Alexander Whitehead
- 2002 to 2015: Philip David Ashdown
- from 2017: William Edward Braviner
