= Adrian Dorber =

British Anglican priest

The Reverend Adrian Dorber
- Dean of Lichfield
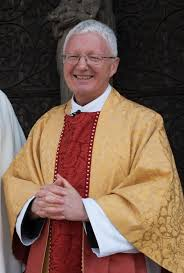
- Church: Church of England
- Diocese: Diocese of Lichfield
- Installed: 24 September 2005
- Term ended: 31 March 2023
- Predecessor: Michael Yorke
- Successor: Jan McFarlane
- Other posts: Director of Ministries and Training, Diocese of Durham (1997–2005)

Orders
- Ordination: 1979 (deacon); 1980 (priest)

Personal details
- Born: 23 September 1952 (age 74)
- Denomination: Anglican
- Spouse: Caroline
- Children: Five
- Education: St John's College, Durham

Adrian John Dorber (born 23 September 1952) is a British retired Anglican priest. From 2005 until his retirement in March 2023, he was the Dean of Lichfield Cathedral in the Church of England.

== Early life and education ==
Dorber was born on 23 September 1952. He was educated at St John's College, Durham (BA, 1974) and King's College London (MTh, 1991).

== Ordained ministry ==
Dorber was ordained in the Church of England as a deacon in 1979 and as a priest in 1980. His first post was a curacy at St Michael and St Mary Magdalene's Church in Easthampstead, Berkshire after which he was Priest in charge at St Barnabas, Emmer Green. From 1985 to 1997 he was Chaplain of Portsmouth Polytechnic then, when its status changed, to be renamed Portsmouth University. He was Director of Ministries and Training in the Diocese of Durham before his elevation to the Deanery as Dean of Lichfield on 24 September 2005. Dorber retired effective 31 March 2023.
