= St Mary's Church, South Ruislip =

Church of St Mary, South Ruislip
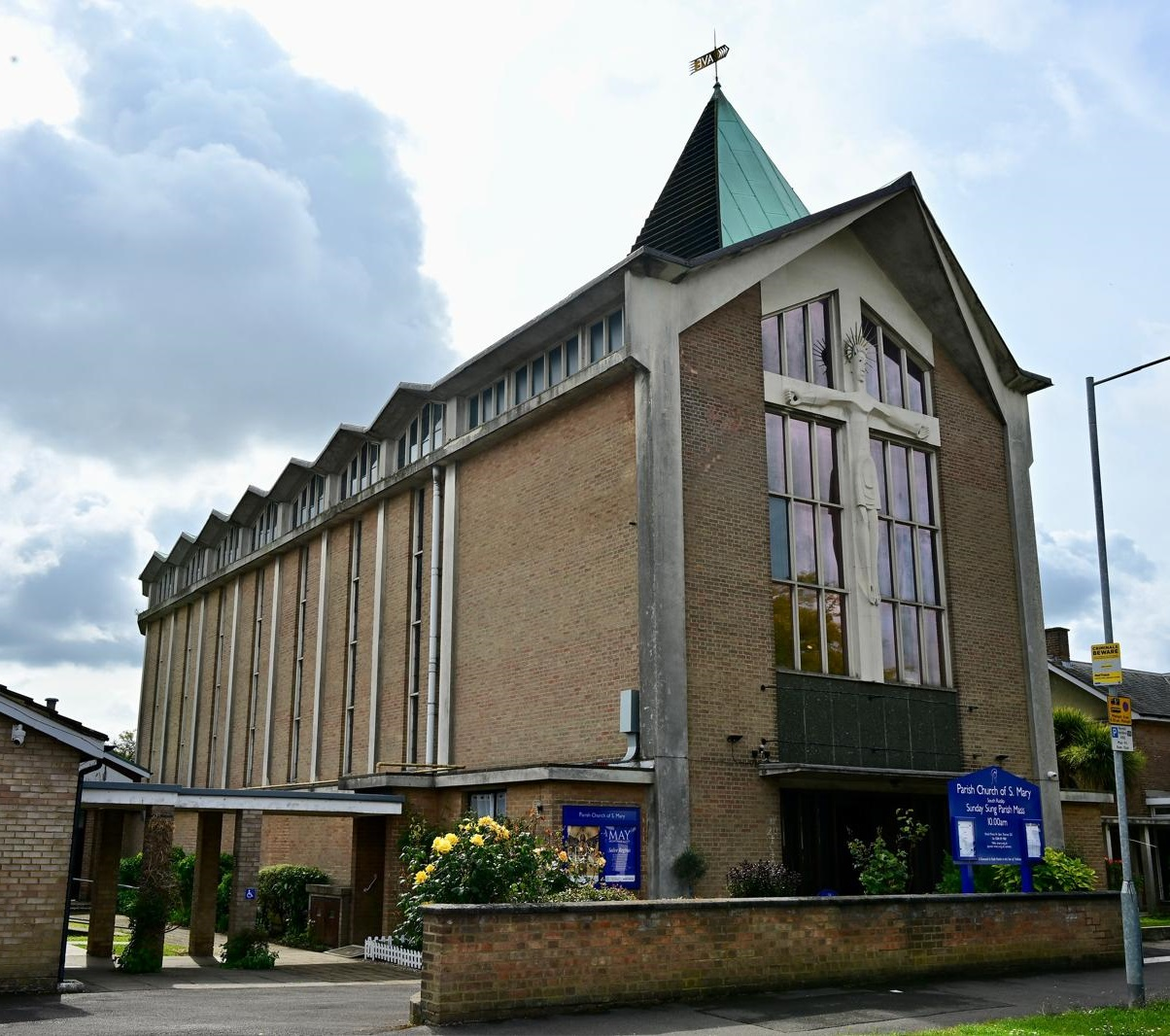
- St Mary's Church, South Ruislip - view from north-west
- Church of St Mary, South Ruislip
- 51.559780°N 0.394026°W
- OS grid reference: TQ 11426 85743
- Country: England
- Denomination: Anglican
- Churchmanship: Anglo-Catholicism
- Website: smary.org.uk

History
- Consecrated: 2 May 1959

Architecture
- Functional status: Active
- Heritage designation: Grade II listed
- Designated: 10 October 2022
- Architect: Laurence King
- Architectural type: Modern
- Groundbreaking: 1957
- Completed: 1959

Administration
- Province: Canterbury
- Diocese: London
- Archdeaconry: Northolt
- Deanery: Hillingdon
- Parish: St Mary Ruislip

Clergy
- Bishop: Bishop of Willesden
- Vicar: Father Glen Thomas SSC

St Mary's Church in South Ruislip is a Church of England parish church in the London Borough of Hillingdon. It was designed by the architect Laurence King in Festival of Britain style and constructed between 1957 and 1959, with structural engineering by Ove Arup and Partners. It was Grade II listed by Historic England in 2022.

== History ==
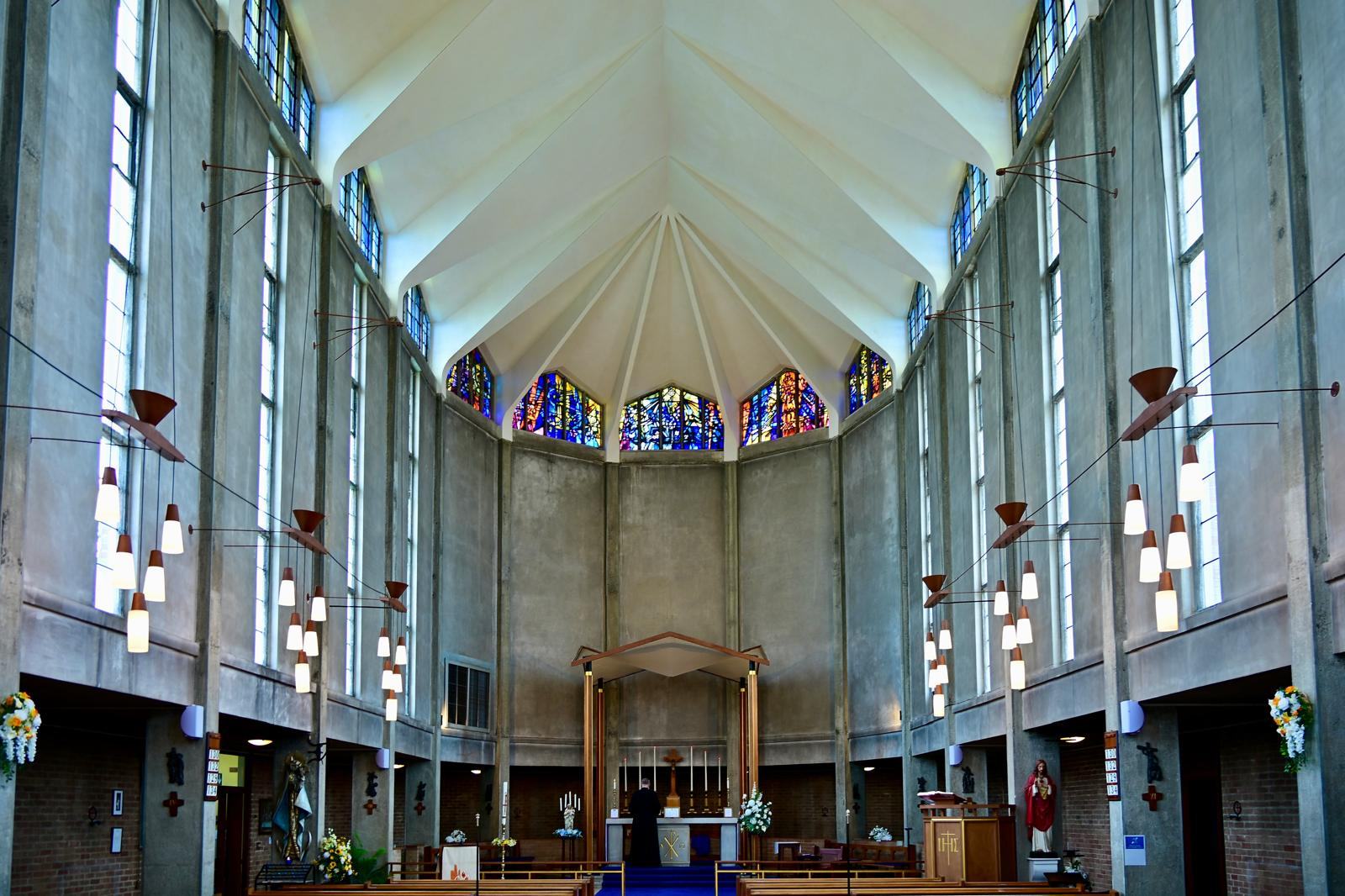
Interior view of nave looking east towards the sanctuary

The Church of England parish of St Mary in South Ruislip was created in 1951, formed from the division of the parish of St Paul, Ruislip Manor. That parish had itself only been created in 1936, carved out of the ancient and expansive medieval parish of St Martin served by the 13th century church on Ruislip High Street. This rapid ecclesiastical reordering reflected the pace of development around the once rural settlement of Ruislip in the early 20th century as a result of the north-western extension of the Metropolitan Railway. This suburban expansion, which became known as Metro-land, created new communities that would otherwise lack religious infrastructure and pastoral care.

In the 1930s a mission hall was built on the site immediately to the north of the present church building to provide relief to the parish church of St Paul. This proved a temporary measure prior to the creation of a distinct parish for South Ruislip.

Following the creation of the parish in 1952, fundraising began for the building of a new church and associated buildings, including the vicarage to the south. The Essex-based ecclesiastical architect Laurence King was commissioned in 1954 to provide a design for the new church and, in March 1956, a scale model was shown at an exhibition of modern architecture in London.

Construction began in October 1957 and the church was consecrated by the Bishop of London, the Rt Rev Henry Montgomery Campbell, on 2 May 1959. Management of the structural engineering was undertaken by the firm of Ove Arup and Partners. The mission hall that had been built in the 1930s was retained and served as the church hall until it was replaced with a more modern structure in the 1970s.

The church was closed in 2019 for asbestos removal and other renovation work. It reopened in June 2024.

The church was awarded Grade II heritage listing status in 2022 for its architectural and historic interest.

== Architecture ==
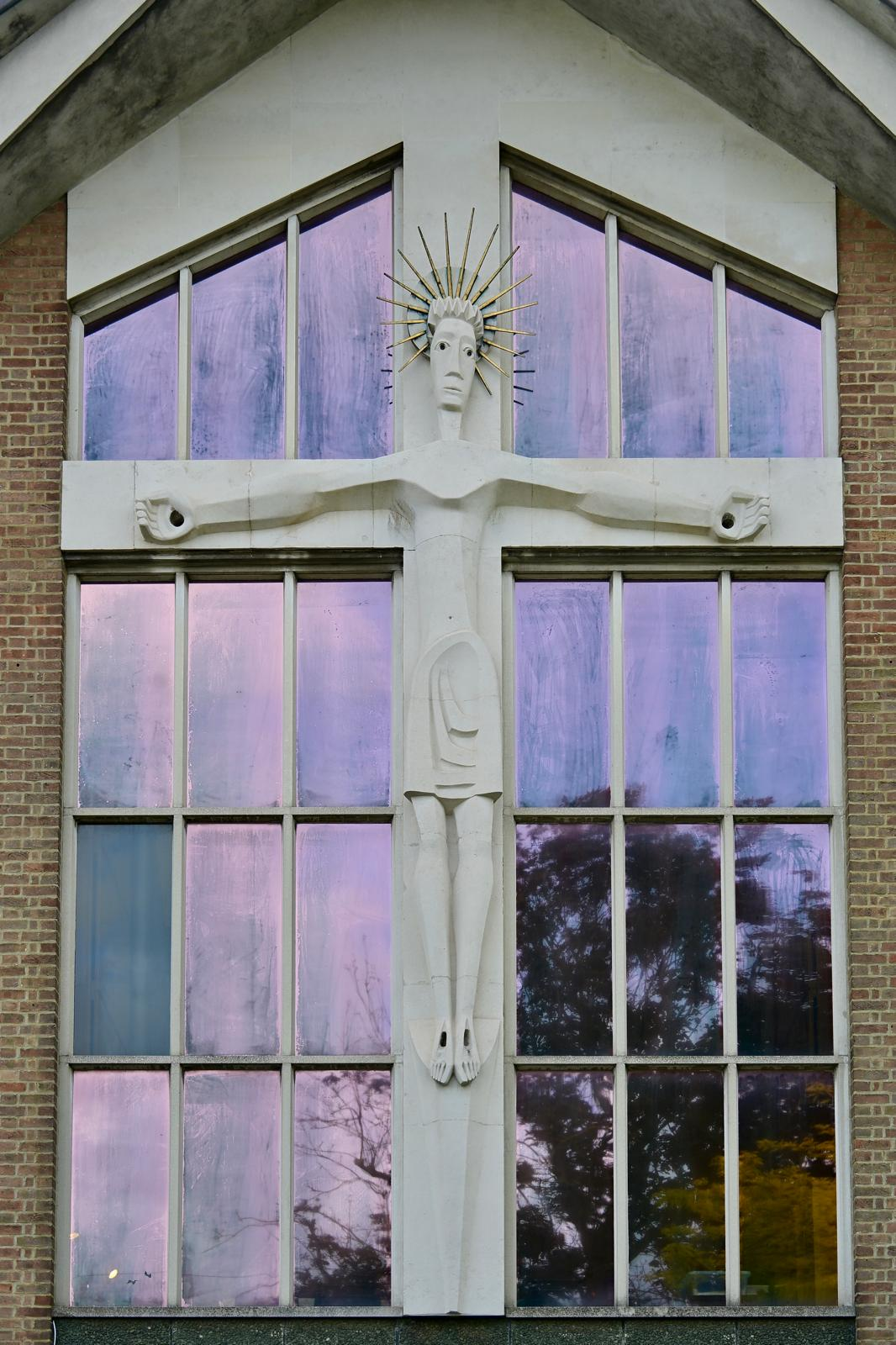
West front sculpture by Brian Asquith

=== Exterior ===
The plan of St Mary's Church is a traditional basilica layout, with a rounded apse positioned to the east of the nave. Nevertheless, King's design makes use of both modern design and construction materials. His specifically British approach to international modernism, influenced by the Festival of Britain, is recognised in the church's heritage listing. King was also a proponent of the Liturgical Movement and his design for St Mary's was intended to promote congregational participation in the liturgy.

The Exterior of St Mary's church is formed of yellow brick within an exposed concrete frame punctuated by seven tall and narrow windows to both north and south elevations. To the east is a semicircular apse. Low north and south aisles are linked by an ambulatory that wraps around the apse. Above, a copper-covered folded-slab roof sits on an unbroken clerestory of irregular pentagonal windows. It is crowned with a pyramidal bellcote that rises behind the west front, which is also copper-clad and latticed to north and south faces.

The west front contains a large multi-panel expanse of clear glazing. This is superimposed with a colossal 7 metrePortland stone sculpture of the crucified Christ. It was carved in situ by Brian Asquith, who had both trained and lectured at the Royal College of Art alongside King. Below the sculpture are porticoed entrance doors cut with Greek cross openings.

Accessed from the east end of the north aisle is an architecturally distinct side chapel. To the south a covered walkway connects to parish rooms and sacristy. A second covered walkway connects to the vicarage, also designed by King as part of the same commission. The two walkways delineate a small courtyard garden.

=== Interior ===
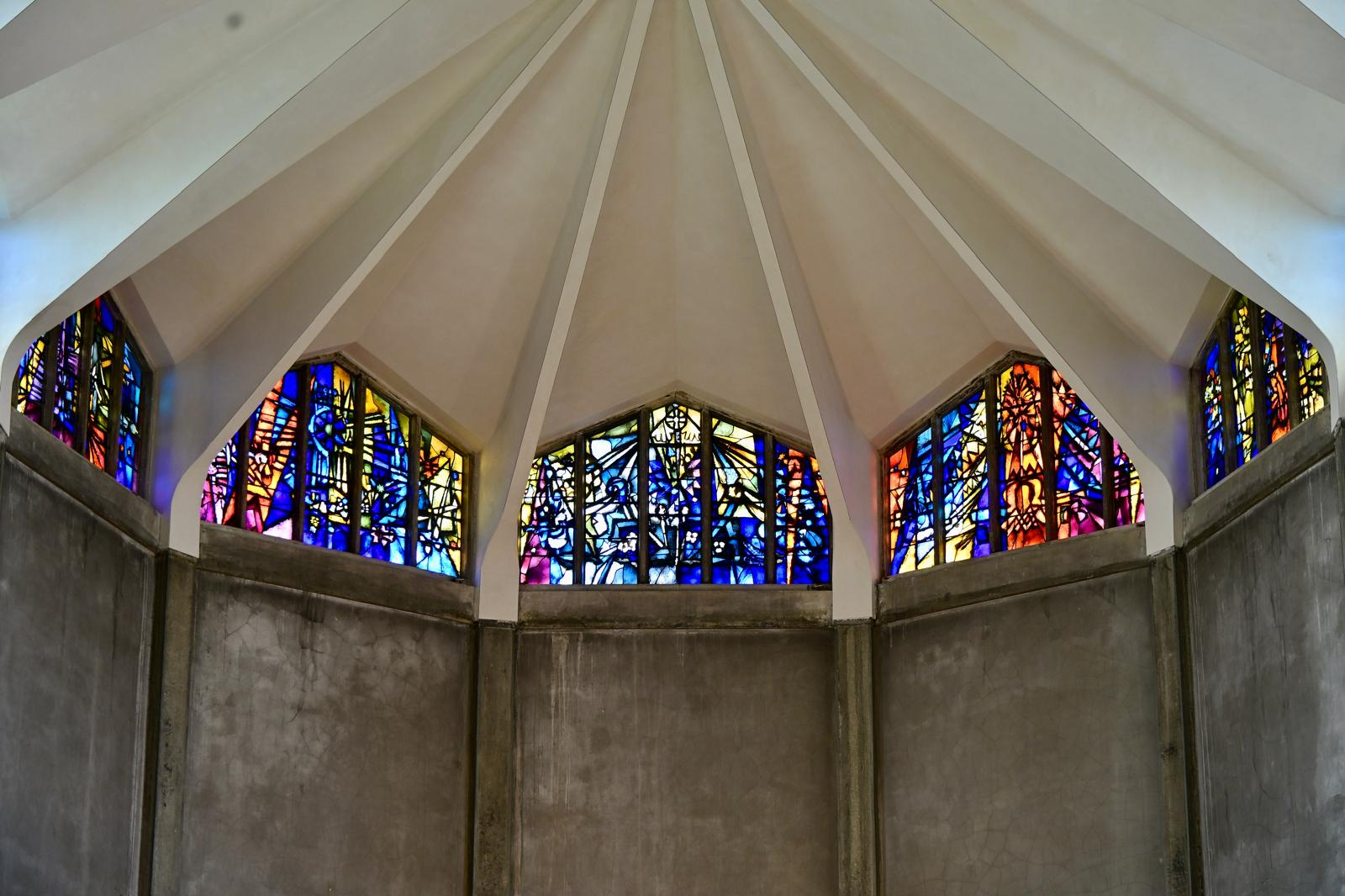
Stained glass by Keith New

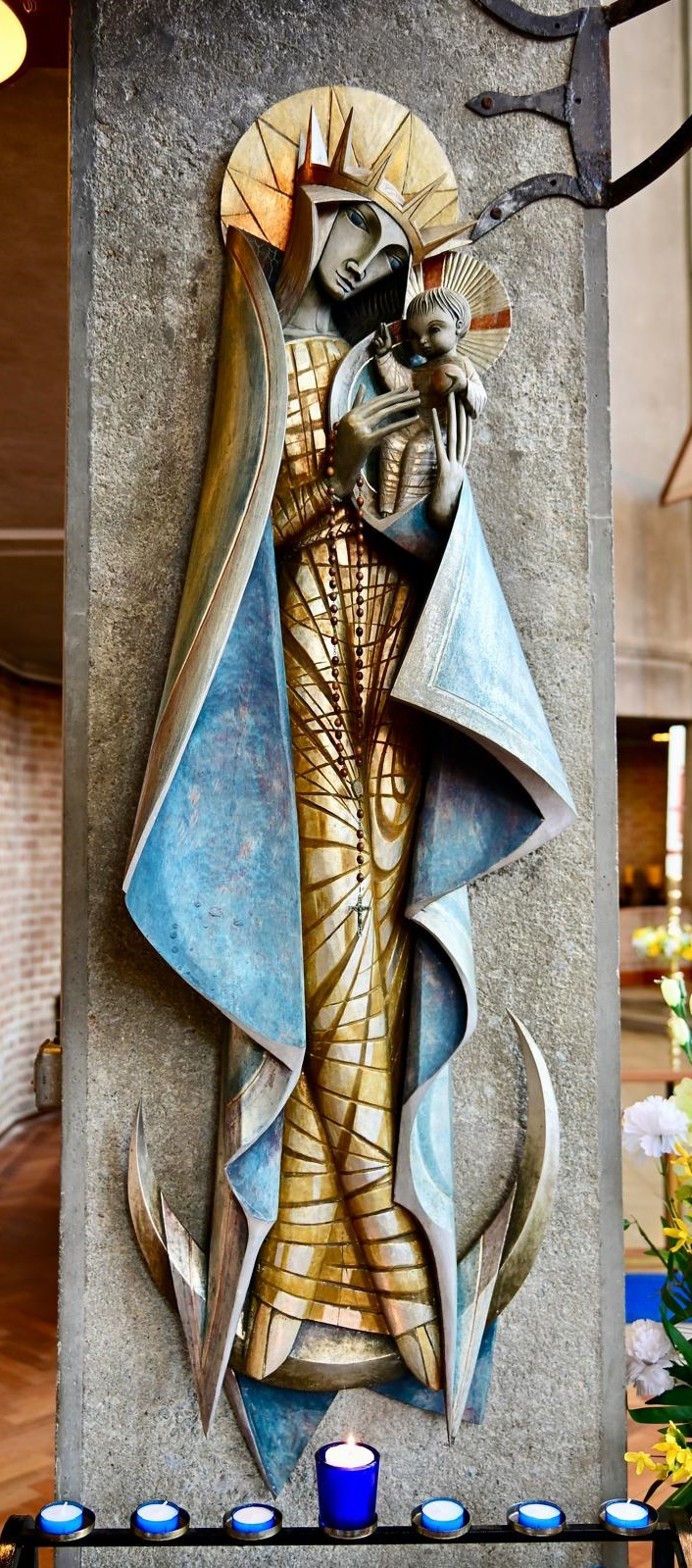
Virgin and Child sculpture by John Hayward

The church is entered via a narthex that is screened from main space by a glass wall. Its low ceiling provides a platform for the choir gallery, positioned directly above and accessed from two corner staircases. The narthex serves as the baptistry and has a centrally placed carved stone font with a gold-painted fibreglass sculpture of Christ Blessing to the front.

Entrance to the nave is via north and south doors into low, narrow aisles that connect behind the semicircular apse, forming an ambulatory. The tall central nave is defined by large vertical slabs of exposed concrete, seven to each side. These delineate the bays of the nave, while five more wrap around the apse. Those to the north and south are pierced by tall and narrow clear-glazed windows to either side, while those behind the apse are unbroken. Above each bay runs a clerestory of irregular pentagonal windows, with five more that curve around the apse. This creates an unbroken run of glass that spans three of the four elevations.

The 14 clerestory windows to the north and south sides are glazed with pale yellow, blue and grey glass in a simple geometric pattern. The five windows that curve around behind the apse have more elaborate semi-abstract glass, serving as one of the church's primary decorative elements. From left to right the apse windows depict symbols of the Nativity, the Crucifixion, the Coronation and Assumption (together in the centre), Pentecost, and the Annunciation. They were designed and made by the artist Keith New with symbolism derived from Rudolf Koch’s ‘Book of Signs’, the same inspiration that New drew on for his windows in the nave of Coventry Cathedral.

In the sanctuary, the simple stone altar, with gilded Chi Rho to the front, is covered by a Modernist ciborium formed from four small hyperbolic parabolas, made from part-gilded carved wood. The communion rails, pulpit and pews were all made by Faith Craft, a specialist provider of ecclesiastical fixtures and furnishings that had been established by the Society of the Faith in 1916 and with whom King frequently collaborated.

Installed on the third north-east pillar is a carved, painted and gilded sculpture of the Virgin and Child. It was designed for the church by the artist John Hayward, another of King's regular collaborators. Hayward also made a hanging rood that was installed behind the altar, though this is no longer in situ as of 2026.

In the choir gallery is a two-manual organ by J. W. Walker & Sons Ltd.
