= Dennis Page =

British bishop

Dennis Fountain Page (1 December 1919 – 19 January 2009) was the Anglican Bishop of Lancaster from 1975 until 1985.

Page was educated at Shrewsbury School and Gonville and Caius College, Cambridge. He was ordained in 1943 and was a curate at Rugby, Warwickshire before becoming the priest in Charge of Hillmorton and then the Rector of Hockwold. From 1965 to 1975 he was the Archdeacon of Huntingdon before his ordination to the episcopate by Stuart Blanch, Archbishop of York, at Blackburn Cathedral on 1 March 1975.

Church of England titles
Preceded by Anthony Hoskyns-Abrahall	Bishop of Lancaster; 1975–1985	Succeeded by Ian Harland
