= Stephen Pedley =

British Anglican bishop (1940–2026)

The Right Reverend Stephen Pedley
- Bishop of Lancaster
- Diocese: Blackburn
- In office: 1998–2005
- Predecessor: Jack Nicholls
- Successor: Geoff Pearson
- Other posts: Honorary assistant bishop in Newcastle (2005–20??); Honorary Chaplain to the Queen (1984–1998)

Orders
- Ordination: 1966
- Consecration: 20 March 1998

Personal details
- Born: 13 September 1940
- Died: 1 July 2026 (aged 85)
- Denomination: Anglican
- Parents: Geoffrey Knight, Muriel Pedley
- Spouse: Mary Macdonald (m. 1970)
- Children: 3
- Education: Queens' College, Cambridge

Geoffrey Stephen Pedley (13 September 1940 – 1 July 2026) was the Bishop suffragan of Lancaster from 1998 until 2005.

== Biography ==
Pedley was born on 13 September 1940 and educated at Marlborough College and Queens' College, Cambridge. Ordained in 1966 after studying at Ripon College Cuddesdon he began his career with curacies in the Liverpool and Coventry dioceses before some time in Zambia. Returning to England in 1977 he became vicar of St Peter's, Stockton-on-Tees and then Whickham before becoming a residentiary canon at Durham Cathedral, a post he held until his ordination to the episcopate.

Having retired to Warden, Northumberland, Pedley served as Assistant Bishop in the Diocese of Newcastle from 2005.

Pedley died on 1 July 2026, aged 85.

Church of England titles
Preceded by Jack Nicholls	Anglican Bishop of Lancaster; 1998–2005	Succeeded by Geoff Pearson
