= Laurence King (architect) =

British architect (1907–1981)

Laurence King FRIBA
- Born: Laurence Edward King; 28 June 1907; Shenfield, Brentwood, Essex, England
- Died: 9 December 1981 (aged 74); Shenfield, Brentwood, Essex, England
- Occupation: Architect
- Buildings: Blackburn Cathedral, St Mary-le-Bow

Laurence Edward King O.B.E., F.R.I.B.A. (28 June 1907 – 9 December 1981) was a British ecclesiastical architect. He led the re-development and expansion of Blackburn Cathedral from 1961 until its consecration in 1977 as well as the reconstruction of the Church of St Mary-le-Bow in the City of London following its devastation during The Blitz. His modernist churches of St Mary, South Ruislip and St Nicholas, Fleetwood have both been listed by Historic England for their architectural and liturgical interest.

== Early life and education ==
Laurence Edward King was born in Shenfield, a suburb of Brentwood in Essex, on 28 June 1907 to Frederick and Flora King.

King was educated at Brentwood School before winning a place to study at the Bartlett School of Architecture, a progressive institution within University College London known for its promotion of modern architectural theory. Studying under Professor Sir Albert Richardson, King was exposed to a disciplined modernist approach to design that prioritised structural clarity and functional form, learning that he would carry into his professional practice.

== Pre-War career ==
After graduating from the Bartlett, King was employed as a junior architect in a succession of architectural practices as well as the Office of Works. He established his independent office in Brentwood in 1932.

King's reputation as an ecclesiastical architect was established early on in his professional career, informed both by his training as well as his own Anglican beliefs. His first major commission was the Church of St George the Martyr in his home town of Brentwood, which was consecrated in 1934. Here King demonstrated his interest in how modern construction materials could be married with traditional ecclesiastical form. The brick and reinforced concrete building is in an Art Deco style reminiscent of the contemporary Odeon Cinemas of Harry Weedon. On the exterior apse wall is a canopied pulpit in stone, which is lit at night.

During the Second World War King served in the British Army in Palestine and North Africa, rising to the rank of Major.

== Post-War career ==
King resumed his architectural practice in 1946 after his wartime service ended. Having been made a fellow of the Royal Institute of British Architects, he was appointed the diocesan surveyor for Chelmsford. One of his early projects was the restoration of the Anglo-Saxon chapel of St Peter-on-the-Wall in Bradwell-on-Sea, the roof of which had been damaged by an ordnance explosion during the War. King proposed a radical intervention, putting forward a plan for rebuilding the apse and adding a west tower. Faced with considerable opposition from the Society for the Protection of Ancient Buildings, King's plans were not pursued beyond a new stone altar, crucifix and paved flooring.

The immediate post-war period provided an abundance of work for King and his peers, who were widely engaged in rectifying the destruction of The Blitz. King won commissions for both the refurbishment and wholesale rebuilding of churches that had been damaged or wholly destroyed. Among his early commissions was the 1950 - 1951 refurbishment of the Church of St Magnus the Martyr in the City of London, where King served as a churchwarden. It had suffered relatively minor damage in comparison to many nearby churches, though King's reordering included the introduction of modern glass by Lawrence Lee.

Around this time King became associated with Faith Craft, a specialist provider of ecclesiastical fixtures and furnishings that had been established by the Society of the Faith in 1916. King was a proponent of the Liturgical Movement that sought to ensure that church architecture and design prioritised the involvement of the congregation in the act of worship. Working with Faith Craft allowed King to plan and execute complete projects that went beyond architecture to include liturgical planning and interior fittings as part of a unified programme of work. He set out his ideas in an essay to accompany a 1951 exhibition at Lambeth Palace titled Art in the Service of the Church, held as part of the Festival of Britain. The same year King was appointed to the Archbishop's Commission on the Repair of Churches and as consulting architect to the Historic Churches Preservation Trust.

His innovative designs were not always successful, for example Blackburn Cathedral's lantern tower and St Michael the Archangel, Letchworth, suffered structural problems. These led to significant rebuilding at Blackburn and closure of the building in Letchworth.

=== St Mary-le-Bow, London ===
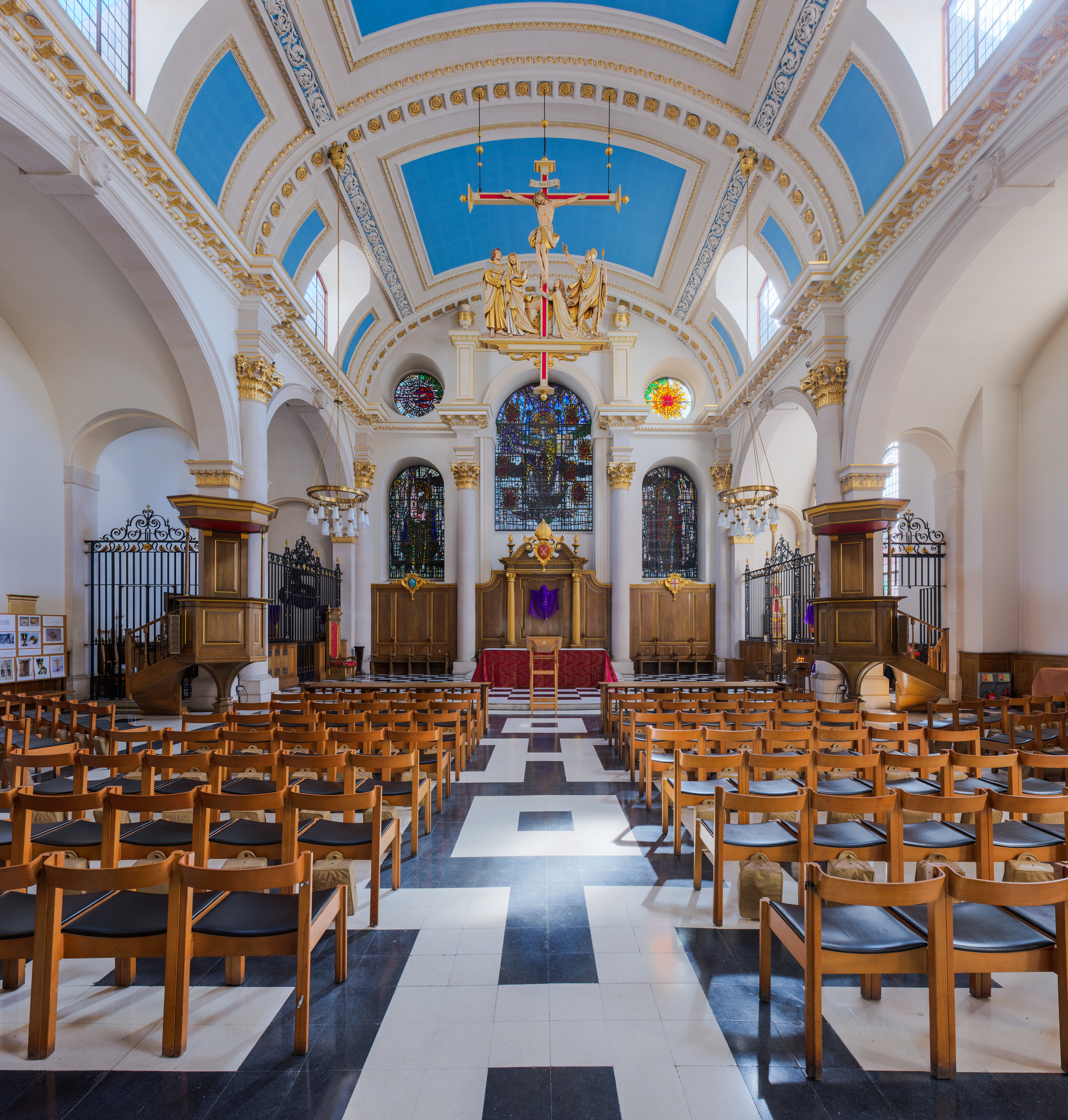
Church of St Mary-le-Bow, City of London

Between 1956 and 1964 King led the single largest project undertaken by Faith Craft, the rebuilding of the Church of St Mary-le-Bow on Cheapside in the City of London. The famous church, built by Christopher Wren between 1670 and 1683 after the Great Fire of London and home to the Bow Bells, has been completely gutted by incendiary bombs in May 1941, reducing the main body to the shell of its exterior walls. King's work on the rebuilding of the church began with stabilising the surviving fabric, including the spire, which has survived collapse but was found to be structurally unsound. Despite its ruined state the church had been Grade I listed in 1950 and, architecturally, King created a near facsimile of Wren's original design. However, King had more leverage to introduce his own ideas when it came to the furnishing of the church given that none of the fixtures and fittings had survived the fire. The new furniture was realised predominantly by Faith Craft's team of in-house artists who married tradition with contemporary style. The modern stained glass was designed and made by John Hayward - lately of Faith Craft - beginning a longstanding professional association between King and the artist.

=== St Mary, South Ruislip ===
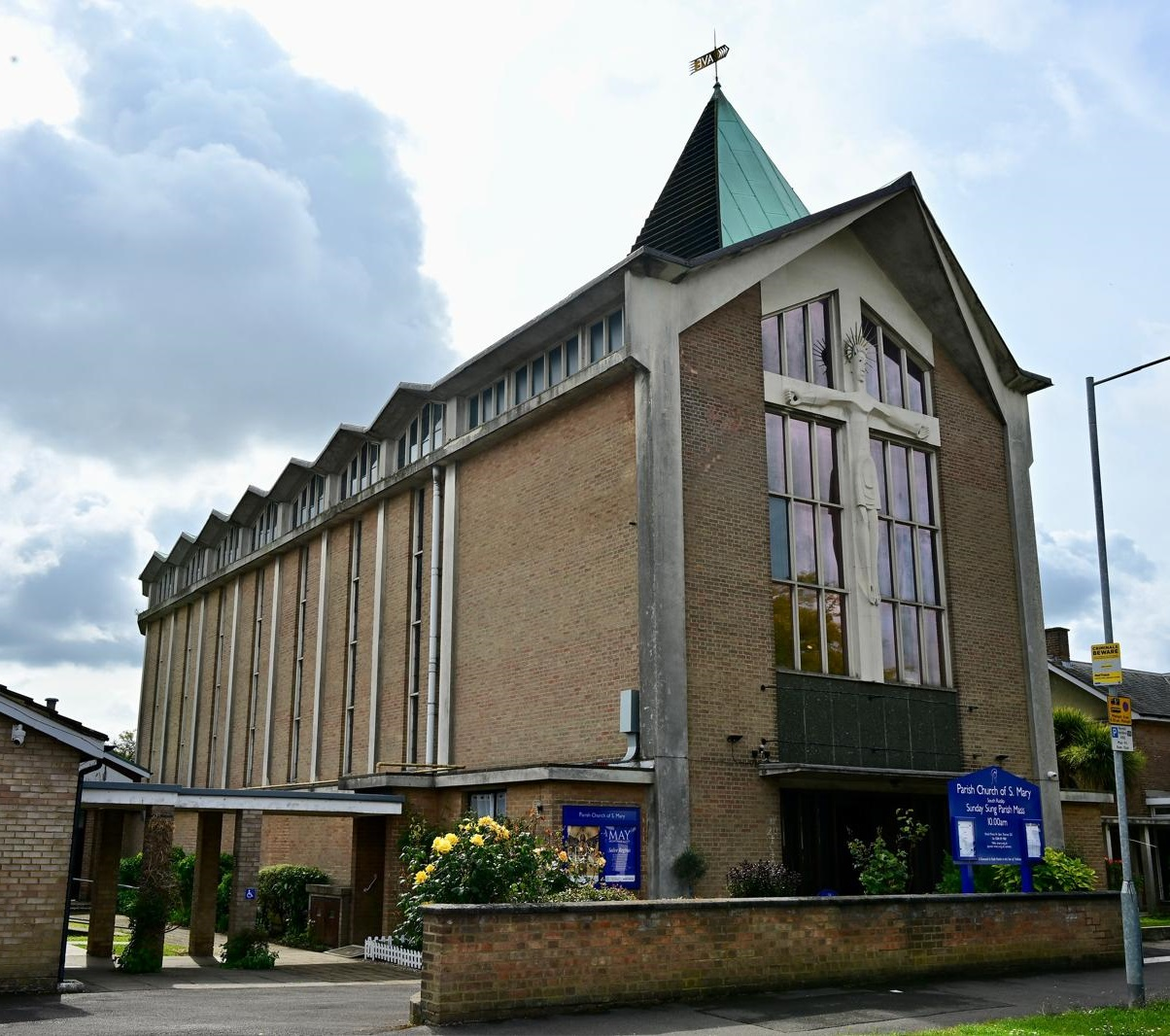
Church of St Mary, South Ruislip

Among King's most distinct new-build churches was the Church of St Mary in South Ruislip in the London Borough of Hillingdon. Built between 1957 and 1959, it was commissioned to serve a parish created in 1952 as London's urban reach expanded west. Despite adopting a traditional basilica plan, King's design was consciously modern, reflecting the influence of the Festival of Britain style and the congregational unity promoted by the Liturgical Movement. Brick built within an exposed concrete frame, it has a copper-covered folded-slab roof above an unbroken clerestory of triangular windows. Construction was realised in collaboration with the engineering firm Ove Arup and Partners. The west front is particularly distinctive, featuring a 7m Portland stone crucifixion sculpture, carved in situ by Brian Asquith. As at St Mary-le-Bow, the interior was fitted out in collaboration with Faith Craft and designers including Hayward and Keith New. The church was Grade II listed in 2022.

=== St Nicholas, Fleetwood ===
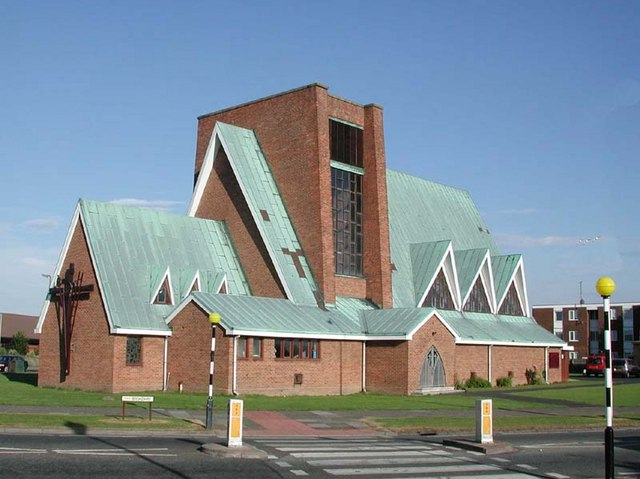
Church of St Nicholas, Fleetwood

For the Church of St Nicholas in Fleetwood, Lancashire, built between 1960 and 1962, King once again produced a design that was traditional in layout but modern in appearance. As at South Ruislip, King used a reinforced concrete frame to create a sculptural form that allowed for a wide, open nave intended to promote congregational involvement in the liturgy. King's design was intended to resemble the upturned keel of a ship, reflecting the seafaring aspects both of the town and St Nicholas himself. From the outside the most prominent features are the steeply pitched copper roofs and large square central tower consisting of two tall tapering brick slabs on the east and west faces. The church was Grade II listed in 2023.

=== Blackburn Cathedral ===
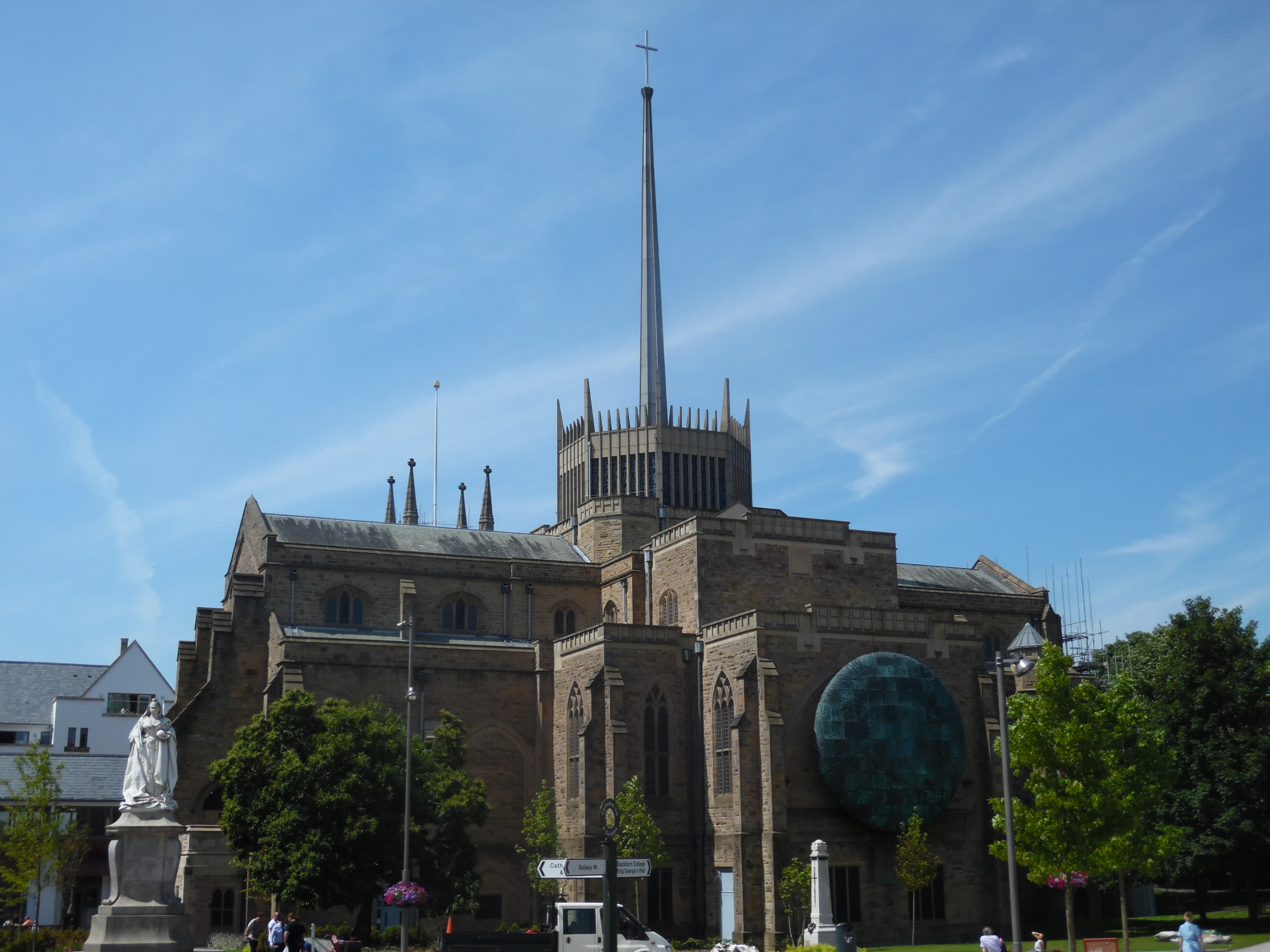
Blackburn Cathedral, crossing tower and east end by Laurence King

In 1961, while his church in Fleetwood was under construction, King was appointed as architect to Blackburn Cathedral, the seat of the Lancashire diocese created in 1926. The expansion of John Palmer's Georgian parish church to reflect its new status as a cathedral had begun in the 1930s under the architect William Adam Forsyth. Forsyth had planned for grand Gothic building that would double the size of the existing church, with a new choir, transept arms and central tower. However, interrupted by the Second World War, money to realise the project ran out in the early 1950s with only the transept complete. After some delay, King was brought in to complete the job on a much reduced budget.

King's brief was to shorten Forsyth's intended eastward extension and provide a more economical solution to the planned central tower. His solution was to replace Forsyth's crossing tower with an octagonal roof lantern constructed from reinforced concrete, topped by an aluminium flèche. The sanctuary would be brought forward and placed directly beneath the new lantern, reducing the need to extend the building east to the extent that had been proposed by Forsyth.

Work on King's plan began in 1962 and the crossing lantern was completed in 1967. Work then progressed to the east end of the cathedral where, beyond the crossing and eastern ambulatory, King oversaw construction of the Jesus Chapel. This truncated space was built as an alternative to Forsyth's intended choir. Construction and fitting out of the cathedral was completed in time for reconsecration in 1977. Throughout the project King once again worked closely with John Hayward on the internal fixtures and fittings.

Within a few years of completion the lantern tower began to show evidence of structural failure. While attempts were made to manage the situation and arrest further deterioration, ultimately, the decision was taken to rebuild. The project, undertaken between 1998 and 1999, was led by the architect Brian Lowe. Lowe replaced the central structure in stone rather than concrete, while otherwise closely mirroring King's original design.

=== St Mary, Little Walsingham ===
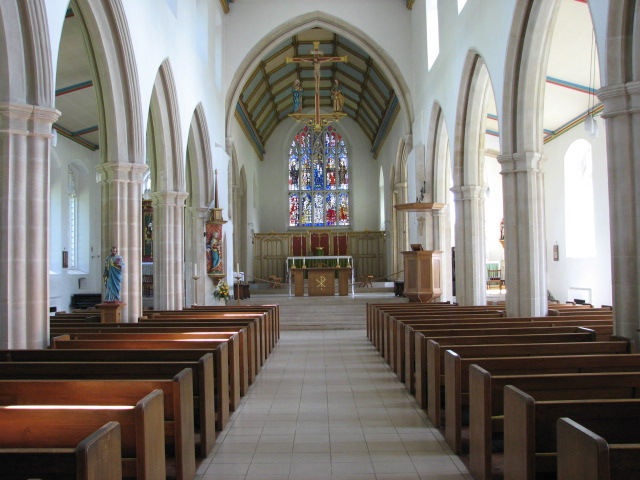
Church of St Mary and All Saints, Little Walsingham

In 1961 a fire at the 14th century Church of St Mary and All Saints in Little Walsingham, Norfolk, almost completely destroyed the church, leaving only the west tower and porch intact beyond the exterior walls. King's experience in renovating bomb-damaged churches in London led to the decision to appoint him as architect for the restoration, undertaken between 1962 and 1964. As at St Mary-le-Bow, King created a close architectural facsimile of the church prior to the fire. The heat had been so intense that the piers and arcading had to be entirely replaced and King followed precisely the 14th century design, which had double hollow chamfer arches to the south and a different design to the north. Once again, the near total destruction of the interior fixtures and fittings - with the notable exception of the celebrated Gothic stone font - provided King with the opportunity to fully reorder the interior. Screens dividing the chancel and side chapels from the nave were not replaced, and the windows were left primarily clear glazed lending a bright and modern feel to the white plastered walls. The east chancel window was fitted with stained glass, King once again commissioning this from John Hayward.

=== Worksop Priory ===
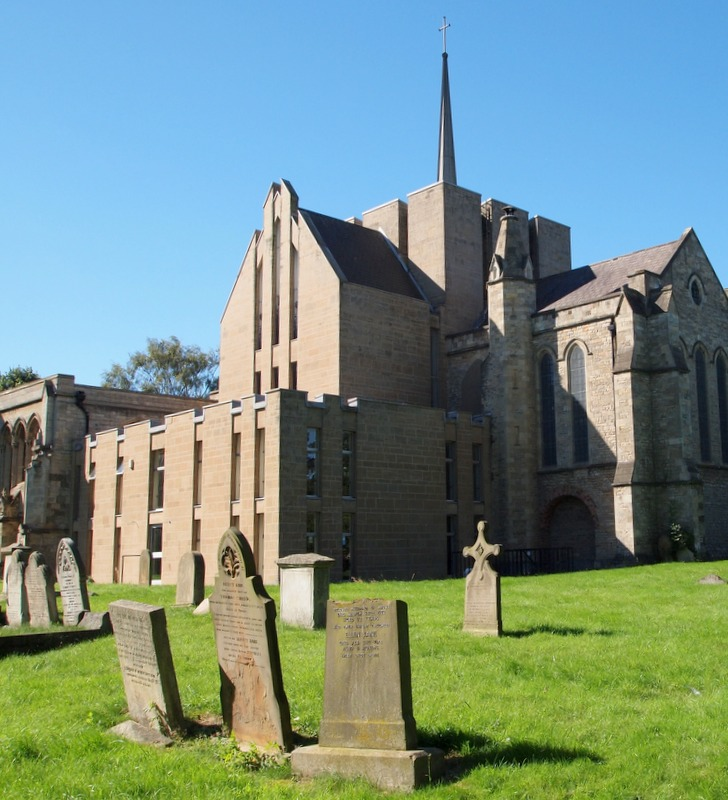
Worksop Priory, crossing tower and east end by Laurence King

In 1966 King was engaged to provide designs for a crossing tower and choir to complete the expansion of Worksop Priory in Nottinghamshire that had begun in the 1920s. The original intention had been to restore the church to a scale approaching its pre-reformation appearance. Initiated by the architect Harold Brakspear, he had planned a new transept, crossing tower and choir in Gothic Revival style attached to the surviving medieval nave. By 1935, Brakspear's transept had been completed. However, funds were not then in place to complete the envisaged tower and choir. It was only in 1965 that, thanks to a new bequest, money became available to compete the expansion. However, in the intervening years, architectural tastes had changed, as had the need - and funds - for a choir on the scale envisaged by Brakspear. King was therefore invited to propose an alternative modern solution. It was a commission not dissimilar to that underway at Blackburn Cathedral and King's approved design shared some obvious similarities. Built between 1970 and 1974, the low crossing tower is topped by an aluminium flèche, below which King placed the sanctuary, equipped with a modern stone altar table and steel and brass hanging corona. The short gabled choir immediately to the east hosts the choir stalls and organ, below an east window glazed by Hayward. King's plan also included new vestries and meeting rooms.

== Later life and death ==
King was appointed an Officer of the Order of the British Empire for services to church restoration in the Queen's Birthday Honours List 1971.

King died in Shenfield on 9 December 1981. He was 74 years old. His funeral was held at the Church of St Thomas of Canterbury in Brentwood, the same church in which he had been baptised in 1907 and remained a member of the congregation for his entire life. King also served as consultant architect to the church and redecorated the chancel in 1951. In 1983 a window dedicated to King and marking the 100th anniversary of the building of the church was installed here. It was designed and made by his frequent collaborator, John Hayward.

== Selected works ==
=== Original architectural commissions ===
- Church of St George the Martyr, Brentwood, Essex (1934)
- Church of St James, Marden Ash, Essex (1957-58)
- Church of St Mary, South Ruislip, London (1957–1959)
- Church of St Nicholas, Fleetwood, Lancashire (1960–1962)
- Church of the Ascension, Chelmsford, Essex (1962)
- Church of St Mary, Hobs Moat, Solihull, West Midlands (1966–1967)
- Church of St Michael the Archangel, Letchworth, Hertfordshire (1966–1967)
- Church of St John, North Woolwich, London (1968)
- Chapel of the Guild of St Michael and the Holy Souls, Little Walsingham, Norfolk (1965)
- Church of St James the Great, Leigh-on-Sea, Essex (1968-1969)
- Church of All Saints, Leyton, London (1973)

=== Major architectural interventions ===
- Church of St Magnus the Martyr, City of London (1950–1951)
- Church St Mary-le-Bow, City of London (1949–1964)
- Cathedral Church of Saint Mary the Virgin with Saint Paul, Blackburn, Lancashire (1961–1977)
- Church of St Mary and All Saints, Little Walsingham, Norfolk (1962–1964)
- Abbey Church of Waltham Holy Cross and St Lawrence, Waltham Abbey, Essex (1964)
- Church of St Andrew, North Weald Bassett, Essex (1964-1965)
- Priory Church of Our Lady and Saint Cuthbert, Worksop, Nottinghamshire (1966-1974)
