= Thomas Masters =

Reverend Thomas Heywood Masters, CBE (9 April 1865 – 1 September 1939) was an Anglican priest.

Masters was born in 1865, and educated at Withington High School, at Inverness College, in Hanover and at Christ's College, Cambridge. Ordained in 1889, his first posts were curacies at St Peter's, Caverswall and St Mark's, Lakenham. He then held incumbencies at All Saints, North Scarle and from 1901 at All Saints, East Meon.

During the Great War, he was a Red Cross Ambulance driver serving in France before his appointment as a Temporary Chaplain to the Forces. Although 50 and married with 4 children, he was 'accepted for France going out in 13 days time with his teeth attended to'. He could ride and speak French and German. By the end of the War, although he had served for only three years, he had been promoted to Assistant Chaplain-General and was twice Mentioned in Despatches. He was also appointed a CBE. When peace returned he became Vicar of St Peter's, Petersfield. After this he was Rural Dean of Portsmouth then Provost of Portsmouth Cathedral, also becoming an Honorary Chaplain to the King.

Masters died on 1 September 1939 and there is a memorial to him at East Meon.

Church of England titles
| Preceded by Bernard Williams | Provost of Portsmouth; 1930 – 1938 | Succeeded by Eric Noel Porter Goff |
