= Benjamin Pollard =

Anglican bishop

The Right Reverend Benjamin Pollard TD
- Bishop of Sodor and Man
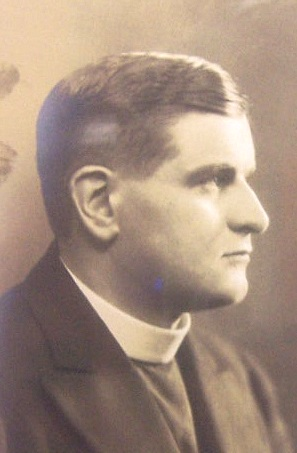
- Pollard when Rector of St Chrysostom's, Manchester
- Diocese: Diocese of Sodor and Man
- In office: 1954 to 1966
- Other post: Bishop of Lancaster (1936–1954)

Orders
- Ordination: 1914
- Consecration: 1936

Personal details
- Born: Benjamin Pollard; 12 September 1890
- Died: 11 April 1967 (aged 76)
- Denomination: Anglicanism
- Spouse: Marjorie (m. 1916–1961) Eileen (m. 1962–1967)
- Children: One

Benjamin Pollard TD (12 September 1890 – 11 April 1967) was an Anglican bishop.

== Early life and education ==
Pollard was born on 12 September 1890, the son of Benjamin Pollard and Cecilia Beatrice Pollard (née Foxwell). He was educated at Manchester Grammar School and the Victoria University of Manchester.

== Ordained ministry ==
He was ordained in 1914 and was a chaplain during World War I with the British Armed Forces. Previously he had spent two years working for the Ministry of Munitions. When interviewed for a commission in the Army Chaplaincy he was noted as ‘A1, good and moderate’. He was posted to East Leeds Hospital, then to Aldershot and finally to Salonika where he remained until after the Armistice. After this he became the Precentor of Sheffield Cathedral and then Rector of Bradfield. From 1924 to 1928 he was Rector of St Chrysostom's Victoria Park, Manchester and then began a long association with the Lancaster area. He was Vicar for eight years and, in his last years there, an archdeacon.

He was ordinated to the episcopate as the first Bishop of Lancaster. This was a suffragan bishopric, and Pollard hoped for promotion to a diocesan post. His name arose first for the vacancy at Wakefield in 1945 but he was seen to lack ‘depth’ and ‘being heavy and a trifle worldly’. It seemed that when he was overlooked for Blackburn in 1954 his opportunity was gone but he received the Archbishop of York's support for Sodor & Man in 1954. He was translated to be the Bishop of Sodor and Man in 1954.

He retired in 1966 and died the following year.

== Personal life ==
In 1916, Pollard married Marjorie Bradbury. They had one son together before her death in 1961. In 1962, he married Eileen Vellan, a widow; she survived him.

Religious titles
| Preceded by Inaugural appointment | Anglican Bishop of Lancaster; 1936–1954 | Succeeded by Anthony Leigh Egerton Hoskyns-Abrahall |
| Preceded by John Ralph Strickland Taylor | Bishop of Sodor and Man; 1954–1966 | Succeeded by George Eric Gordon |
