= Ian Harland =

British bishop (1932–2008)

Ian Harland (19 December 1932 – 27 December 2008) was a Church of England cleric, serving as Anglican Bishop of Lancaster then Bishop of Carlisle.

== Life ==
From a clerical family (Samuel Harland, general secretary of the Commonwealth and Continental Church Society, was his father), Harland was educated at The Dragon School in Oxford and Haileybury. He then went to university at Peterhouse, Cambridge, taking a law degree. After two years as a schoolmaster at Sunningdale School he studied for the priesthood at Wycliffe Hall, Oxford and began his ministry as a curate in Melton Mowbray in 1960.

He was subsequently Vicar of three parishes in the diocese of Sheffield - Oughtibridge (1963–72), St Cuthbert at Fir Vale and Brightside (1972–75), then Rotherham (1975–79). In the last two posts he also served as Rural Dean of Ecclesfield and Archdeacon of Doncaster, and in 1967 he married Susan Hinman, with whom he had one son and three daughters. From 1979 to 1982 he served as Archdeacon of Doncaster (working closely with the bishop Stewart Cross) and chairman of that diocese's Youth Committee, arranging a youth pilgrimage to Iona.

He was elevated to the episcopate as Bishop Suffragan of Lancaster in 1985, again under Cross (appointed Bishop of Blackburn from 1982). Translated to Carlisle four years later and entering the House of Lords in 1996 (where he was part of the pro-fox hunting Middle Way Group), he retired in 2000 to live in Gargrave (near Skipton, North Yorkshire). In retirement he continued working as an honorary assistant bishop within the Diocese of Bradford and in chaplaincy work in the Diocese of Europe, alongside being an active trustee of the Settle and Carlisle Railway Trust, until his death late in December 2008. His memorial service, conducted by the Dean of Carlisle took place on 8 February 2009 in Carlisle Cathedral.

Church of England titles
Preceded by Dennis Fountain Page	Bishop of Lancaster; 1985 – 1989	Succeeded by Jack Nicholls
Preceded by Henry David Halsey	Bishop of Carlisle; 1989 – 2000	Succeeded by Graham Dow
