= Anthony Hoskyns-Abrahall =

British bishop and priest

- Bishop of Lancaster
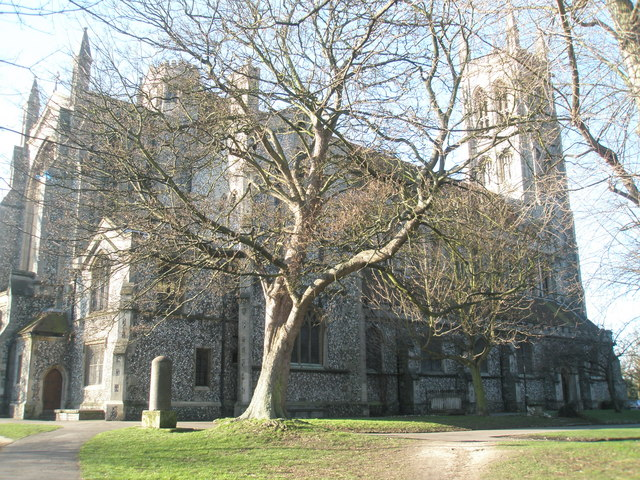
- St Mary's, Portsea
- Diocese: Diocese of Blackburn
- In office: 1955–1975
- Predecessor: Benjamin Pollard
- Successor: Dennis Page
- Other posts: Honorary assistant bishop (Blackburn, 1975–1982)

Orders
- Ordination: 1931 (deacon); 1932 (priest)
- Consecration: 1955 by Cyril Garbett

Personal details
- Born: 13 October 1903
- Died: 1 May 1982 (aged 78)
- Denomination: Anglican
- Parents: Bennet & Edith née Tapp
- Spouse: Margaret née Storey
- Children: 2 sons; 1 daughter
- Education: Royal Naval College (Osborne and Dartmouth)

Anthony Leigh Egerton Hoskyns-Abrahall (13 October 1903 – 1 May 1982) was an Anglican priest and bishop who served as the Bishop of Lancaster (a suffragan bishop in the Diocese of Blackburn) from 1955 until 1975.

== Early life and military service ==
Hoskyns-Abrahall was born on 13 October 1903 to Bennet and Edith (née Tapp), and was descended from the Hoskyns baronets. He was educated at Shrewsbury School and trained at the Royal Naval College, Osborne, and Dartmouth. He served in the Royal Navy. He was promoted from acting sub-lieutenant to sub-lieutenant on 15 October 1924, and from sub-lieutenant to lieutenant on 15 December 1926. As a lieutenant he was PT instructor at RNC Dartmouth. He played cricket for the Navy, soccer for the Naval officers, rugby for Portsmouth Combined Services, he boxed for the navy and had a handicap of about 2 at golf. He left the Royal Navy in 1929.

== Ordained ministry ==
He trained for the ministry at Westcott House, Cambridge. He was ordained a deacon on 27 September 1931 and a priest on 18 December 1932 (both times by Neville Lovett, Bishop of Portsmouth, at Portsmouth Cathedral), and was a curate at St Mary's Portsea before becoming a chaplain at Shrewsbury School. He served St Wilfrid's Harrogate as chaplain, married Margaret Storey in 1937 – they had two sons and one daughter.

During the Second World War, Hoskyns-Abrahall served as a chaplain with the Royal Naval Volunteer Reserve (RNVR). In November 1939, he was made a temporary chaplain with seniority from 10 October 1939: chaplains in the Royal Navy do not hold a rank. He was then Vicar of St Michael's Church, Aldershot (and later also Rural Dean of Aldershot) before his appointment to the episcopate.

He was consecrated and ordained a bishop on 1 February 1955 by Cyril Garbett, Archbishop of York, in York Minster, and served as Bishop suffragan of Lancaster (in the Diocese of Blackburn) until his retirement on 1 January 1975. In retirement, he continued to serve that diocese as an honorary assistant bishop.

Religious titles
Preceded by Benjamin Pollard	Bishop of Lancaster; 1955–1975	Succeeded by Dennis Page
