= Eric Porter Goff =

Eric Noel Porter Goff was an Anglican priest.

He was born on Christmas Eve 1902, educated at Trinity College, Dublin and ordained in 1927. His first posts were at Christ Church, Westminster, St. Michael's Church, Chester Square and Immanuel, Streatham. In 1939 he became Provost of Portsmouth. He resigned in 1972 and died on 4 April 1981. His clerical career ended in sad circumstances.

Church of England titles
Preceded by Thomas Heywood Masters	Provost of Portsmouth; 1939 – 1972	Succeeded by Michael John Nott
