= David Stancliffe =

Church of England bishop (born 1942)

The Right Reverend David Stancliffe
- Bishop of Salisbury
- Church: Church of England
- Diocese: Salisbury
- In office: 1993–2010
- Predecessor: John Baker
- Successor: Nick Holtam
- Other post: Provost of Portsmouth (1982–1993)

Orders
- Ordination: 1967
- Consecration: 30 November 1993

Personal details
- Born: 1 October 1942 (age 84) Devizes, Wiltshire, United Kingdom
- Denomination: Anglican
- Parents: Michael Stancliffe
- Spouse: Sarah Smith (m. 1965)
- Profession: Anglican bishop, former musician
- Education: Trinity College, Oxford

Member of the House of Lords
- Lord Spiritual
- Bishop of Salisbury; 20 January 1998 – 30 September 2010

David Staffurth Stancliffe (born 1 October 1942) is a British retired Anglican bishop in the Church of England. He was provost of Portsmouth Cathedral from 1982 to 1993 and Bishop of Salisbury from 1993 to 2010. He is the third generation of his family to be in ordained ministry.

== Early life ==
The son of Michael Stancliffe, a Dean of Winchester who was himself ordained at Salisbury Cathedral, Stancliffe was born in 1942 in Devizes, Wiltshire, where his father was curate of St James' Southbroom, later serving at Ramsbury and Cirencester before becoming chaplain to Westminster School. It was from Westminster School that Stancliffe went to Trinity College, Oxford, to study classics and philosophy and where he was organ scholar. He has a Master of Arts (MA Oxon) degree from Oxford.

While at university, Stancliffe abandoned thoughts of a musical career in favour of ordination and instead went to theological training at Cuddesdon College in October 1965.

== Ordained ministry ==
Stancliffe was ordained as a deacon on 8 December 1967 by John Moorman, Bishop of Ripon, at the chapel of the Hostel of the Resurrection, University of Leeds and as a priest on 22 December 1968 by Howard Cruse, Bishop of Knaresborough, at Ripon Cathedral. Stancliffe served as curate of the Leeds parish of St Bartholomew's Armley. Three years later he returned to the West Country as chaplain to Clifton College, Bristol.

In 1977, Stancliffe was appointed a canon residentiary of Portsmouth Cathedral and the diocesan director of ordinands and, subsequently, the lay ministerial adviser. For a time he also undertook the role of precentor in a combination of duties which recognised his special interests in the areas of liturgy, church architecture and music, while also involving him in clergy formation and training and the work of the parishes in the diocese.

Stancliffe was appointed Provost of Portsmouth in 1982 and his major work from then until 1993 was the completion and reordering of Portsmouth Cathedral, shaping its life and work to fulfil its primary function of supporting the Bishop of Portsmouth.

Alongside other duties in the Diocese of Portsmouth, he was vice-chairman of the governors of Portsmouth Grammar School, a governor of Chichester Theological College, a member of the governing bodies of the Southern Dioceses Ministerial Training Scheme and of Salisbury & Wells Theological College and chairman of the Southern Regional Institute.

In July 1993, Stancliffe succeeded Colin James, Bishop of Winchester, as chairman of the Church of England's Liturgical Commission, a position which he held until 2005. He served on the commission from 1986. Work with the commission has involved the publication of The Promise of His Glory and the preparation and publication of the Common Worship liturgies. This significant contribution to the life of the Church of England was recognised by the award by Rowan Williams, Archbishop of Canterbury, of a Lambeth Doctorate in Divinity (DD) in 2004. Stancliffe has been a member of the Council for the Care of Churches.

Stancliffe was consecrated a bishop on 30 November 1993 by George Carey, Archbishop of Canterbury, at Westminster Abbey, and enthroned Bishop of Salisbury in Salisbury Cathedral on 9 December 1993. In June 2008, Stancliffe suffered a stroke and while remaining Bishop of Salisbury took a leave of absence from episcopal duties. On 6 January 2010 he announced his intention to retire from the see of Salisbury. His final act as bishop was the ordination of priests at Salisbury Cathedral at Petertide on 3 July 2010. Although he officially retired as of 13 July 2010, he continued in his duties at General Synod and completed his commitments as bishop and member of the House of Lords.

He is a fellow of St Chad's College, Durham, the president of Affirming Catholicism and vice-president of the Royal School of Church Music.

On 11 February 2017, fourteen retired bishops signed an open letter to the then-serving bishops of the Church of England. In an unprecedented move, they expressed their opposition to the House of Bishops' report to General Synod on sexuality, which recommended no change to the church's canons or practises around sexuality. By 13 February, a serving bishop (Alan Wilson, Bishop of Buckingham) and nine further retired bishops — including Stancliffe — had added their signatures; on 15 February, the report was rejected by synod.

== Personal life ==
At Oxford he met Sarah Smith, a member of the same small choir. They were married at Westminster Abbey in July 1965.

== Publications ==
- God's Pattern: Shaping our Worship, Ministry and Life, SPCK, 2003. ISBN 9780281053605
- The Pilgrim Prayerbook (compilation), Continuum, 2006. ISBN 9780826481672
- The Lion Companion to Church Architecture, Lion Publishing, 2008. ISBN 9780745951904
