= Anglican Bishop of Lancaster =

Suffragan bishop in the Church of England

The Bishop of Lancaster is a suffragan bishop of the Church of England Diocese of Blackburn, in the Province of York, England. The title takes its name after the traditional county town of Lancaster in Lancashire; the See was erected under the Suffragans Nomination Act 1888 by Order in Council dated 24 July 1936. The current bishop is Jill Duff.

== List of Anglican bishops ==
Anglican Bishops of Lancaster
From	Until	Incumbent	Notes
1936	1954	Benjamin Pollard	Translated to Sodor and Man
1955	1975	Anthony Hoskyns-Abrahall	
1975	1985	Dennis Page	
1985	1989	Ian Harland	Translated to Carlisle
1990	1997	Jack Nicholls	Translated to Sheffield
1998	2006	Stephen Pedley	
2006	2017	Geoff Pearson	Retired 31 July 2017.
2018	present	Jill Duff	Since consecration, 29 June 2018.
