= Jill Duff =

British Anglican bishop

The Right Reverend Dr Jill Duff
- Bishop of Lancaster
- Church: Church of England
- Diocese: Diocese of Blackburn
- In office: 2018–present
- Other posts: Director of St Mellitus College, North West (March 2013 – 2018)

Orders
- Ordination: 2003 (deacon); 2004 (priest)
- Consecration: 2018

Personal details
- Born: Jillian Louise Calland Worsley; 1972 (age 53–54) Bolton, Lancashire, England
- Denomination: Anglicanism
- Spouse: Rev. Jeremy Duff
- Children: 2 sons
- Education: Christ's College, Cambridge; Worcester College, Oxford; Wycliffe Hall, Oxford

Jillian Louise Calland Duff (called Jill; née Worsley; born 1972) is a British Anglican bishop. Since 2018, she has been the Bishop of Lancaster, a suffragan bishop in the Diocese of Blackburn. Previously, she had been Director of St Mellitus College, North West, an Anglican theological college, from 2013 to 2018.

Before ordination, she studied chemistry at university and worked in the oil industry. After ordination in the Church of England, she served in the Diocese of Liverpool in parish ministry, chaplaincy, and church planting.

== Early life and education ==
Duff was born in 1972 in Bolton, Lancashire, England. She was educated at Bolton School, a private school in Bolton. She studied Natural Sciences at Christ's College, Cambridge, graduating with a Bachelor of Arts (BA) degree in 1993: as per tradition, her BA was promoted to a Master of Arts (MA Cantab) degree in 1997. She then studied chemistry at Worcester College, Oxford, completing her Doctor of Philosophy (DPhil) degree in 1996. Her doctoral thesis was titled "Investigations of redox-coupled proton transfer by iron-sulfur cluster systems in proteins". Her early career was spent working in the oil industry.

== Ordained ministry ==
Duff trained for ordained ministry at Wycliffe Hall, Oxford, an evangelical Anglican theological college. She also studied theology during this time, and graduated from Wycliffe with a BA degree in 2002. She was ordained in the Church of England as a deacon in 2003 and as a priest in 2004.

From 2003 to 2005, Duff served her curacy at St Philip's Church, Litherland in the Diocese of Liverpool. In 2005, she was appointed the first pioneer minister in the Diocese of Liverpool. In that role, she was tasked with planting churches in Liverpool city centre to evangelise to the unchurched in their 20s and 30s. In 2009, she was additionally appointed chaplain to Liverpool College, then a private all-through school: she would continue this role part-time until 2016.

In 2011, Duff left her church planting role, and was appointed a vocations development advisor in the Diocese of Liverpool and an initial ministerial education (IME) tutor. In 2012, she liaised between St Mellitus College, an Anglican theological college in London, and the Church of England's north west dioceses (Blackburn, Carlisle, Chester, Liverpool, and Manchester) to create a new theological college in the North West of England. In March 2013, she was appointed the first director of St Mellitus College, North West. St Mellitus NW is the first full-time ordination course in the North West since St Aidan's College, Birkenhead was closed in 1969. She has additionally held Permission to Officiate in the Dioceses of Liverpool since 2013, of Chester since 2017, and Diocese of St Asaph since 2018.

=== Episcopal ministry ===
On 13 March 2018, Duff was announced as the next Bishop of Lancaster, a suffragan bishop in the Diocese of Blackburn. She was consecrated a bishop by John Sentamu, Archbishop of York, on 29 June 2018 during a service at York Minster. She was installed as the eighth suffragan Bishop of Lancaster in July 2018 during a service at Blackburn Cathedral.

=== Views ===
Duff is an evangelical Anglican. She was involved in the Church of England's "Living in Love and Faith" (LLF); discussions relating to "matters of identity, sexuality, relationships and marriage". She was also involved in The Beautiful Story, a film released by the Church of England Evangelical Council in response to LLF which championed the Church of England's traditional teaching on sex, sexuality and same-sex relationships. She holds an "orthodox position" on sex and marriage, which means that she is against same-sex marriage.

In 2023, following the news that the House of Bishop's of the Church of England was to introduce proposals for blessing same-sex relationships, she signed an open letter which stated:

many Christians in the Church of England and the Anglican Communion, together with Christians from across the churches of world Christianity, continue to believe that marriage is given by God for the union of a man and woman and that it cannot be extended to those who are of the same sex. [...] Without seeking to diminish the value of many committed same-sex relationships, for which there is much to give thanks, we find ourselves constrained by what we sincerely believe the Scriptures teach which cannot be set aside.

During the Church of England's February 2023 General Synod meeting, Duff was one of four bishops in the house to vote against the successful proposal to introduce blessings and prayers for same-sex relationships. She also voted against introducing "standalone services for same-sex couples" on a trial basis during a meeting of the General Synod in November 2023; the motion passed.

Despite being an "outspoken opponent of the introduction of blessings for same-sex couples in the Church of England", she took part in the laying on of hands during the consecration of David Morris as a bishop in the Church in Wales: he is engaged to marry a man but the Church in Wales allows its clergy to enter into same-sex marriages.

== Personal life ==
Duff is married to Jeremy Duff: he is an Anglican priest who is currently the Principal of St Padarn's Institute, a theological training initiative of the Church in Wales. He is also the author of a well known Greek textbook, “The Elements of New Testament Greek (3rd edition)”. Together they have two sons.
