= Anthony Cane =

Dean of Portsmouth Cathedral (born 1961)

Anthony William Nicholas Strephon Cane is the current dean of Portsmouth: he was installed on Saturday 16 March 2019.

Cane was born on 25 August 1961 He was sired in Cape Town, South Africa: his English parents had emigrated the previous year. He is married, and has three adult children. He attended the Bishops Diocesan College, Cape Town and the University of Cape Town, where he read English and history. Before his ordination training at Westcott House Theological College in Cambridge (1987–90), he worked with homeless people and ex-drug addicts in central London (1982–84), and then as a Church Community worker at Chelsea Methodist Church on London's Kings Road (1984–87).

His curacy was at All Saints, Kings Heath, in Birmingham (1990–93); after which he then spent six years as senior chaplain at the University of Brighton (1993–1999) a multi-campus former polytechnic. Following a spell as priest in charge of St Luke's, Torquay and adult training officer in the Diocese of Exeter, he worked as adult education officer in the Diocese of Chichester (2001–2007), developing courses for parishes, training lay readers, and designing and running a new IME 4-7 (initial ministerial education) programme for curates.

As chancellor of Chichester Cathedral (2007–2019), Cane led the cathedral's work in the areas of education, the arts, visitor engagement, and external partnerships. amongst other things he delivered an annual series of public lectures, introduced five series of films with spiritual themes in a local cinema, was a founder member of three charities (including the Festival of Chichester and an after-school drop-in for young people in the cathedral's bell tower), served as a governor of the University of Chichester (where he taught a module on theology and film), initiated a ‘Night Cathedral’ event for students, developed a popular ‘Gospel Day’ exploring the Bible through word, music and art and chaired the Diocese of Chichester Academy Trust.

Cane's PhD research (at the University of Birmingham) was published as The Place of Judas Iscariot in Christology (Ashgate, 2005) and he has appeared on radio and television programmes about Judas. He has published a number of articles (including in Theology and New Blackfriars) and reviews, many in the Church Times, and contributed chapters to the Otter Memorial Papers (a series on different aspects of the history and cultural life of Chichester).
