= Wednesfield Grammar School =

Grammar school

Wednesfield Grammar School was a grammar school in Wednesfield in the West Midlands of England. It opened on the Wednesfield site in 1960; and merged with March End Secondary Modern in 1969 to form Wednesfield High School.

== History ==
Note on terminology and sources. In the period 1959-1966, getting into a grammar school normally required success in an examination taken in the last year of primary school, called the "11-plus". During this period, both grammar and secondary modern schools took in pupils from primary schools at a typical age of 11, though some might turn 11 in their first term. Such new pupils were known as "First-Years" whereas in 2023 and for a long time past they would have been called "Year 7s". The higher years were likewise named: Second Year = Year 8, Third Year = Year 9, Fourth Year = Year 10, Fifth Year = Year 11. (This matches the system adopted by Hogwarts School as imagined by J K Rowling.) At the very top end, pupils were "Sixth-Formers" of various types. The author of the edit of 10 January 2023 (hereinafter "M") was part of the School's first intake in September 1959 and left in July 1966 (to go to university in October 1966). He has checked his recollections by reference to his own termly reports from the School, together with the School Magazines of the period. The details of the comprehensivisation of Wednesfield's three secondary schools are based on a conversation with the late Mr W N White around the time it happened.

1959-1960. Wednesfield Grammar School (initially calling itself "Grammar-Technical") came into existence in the school year 1959-1960, under the headmastership of Mr W N White. Its intended premises in Lichfield Road, Wednesfield were not ready until September 1960, so in 1959-1960 the pupils, mostly living in Wednesfield, were bussed to Wednesbury where there was plenty of space in some newly-completed premises. In 1959-1960, the grammar school comprised a small Second Year ("M" does not know where these pupils came from) and a First Year including "M". The First Year comprised four forms of 20-odd pupils (1A to 1D, alphabetical by surname). Mr White headed in 1959-1960 both the grammar school and a secondary modern School (then just of First-Years) which shared the premises. The secondary modern school remained in the premises in Wednesbury after 1959-1960.

1960-1961. The grammar school moved to Lichfield Road, Wednesfield in September 1960. Of course, the 1959-1960 pupils became Second- and Third-Years in 1960-1961. A new First Year arrived comprising five forms (1A to 1E, alphabetical by surname). In addition, some pupils arrived into the Second and Third Years, transferred from various secondary modern schools. The school acquired a Deputy Headmaster, Mr L H Morris, and a Senior Mistress, Miss M Waite. With only three years of pupils (and the Third Year still not of normal strength), pupils and staff "rattled around" in premises designed for up to seven years of pupils.

1961-1966. Each year, the school grew, finally to fill the accommodation. In 1965-1966, there were five years below the Sixth Form. The Sixth form comprised a Sixth General, a Sixth Lower, a Sixth Upper, and a Sixth Senior.

The pupils were streamed by ability in each major subject from the Third Year until they entered the Sixth Form or else left school without entering the Sixth Form. Those generally in the higher streams took GCE O-Level at the end of the Fourth Year, and if successful went into the Lower Sixth (skipping being Fifth-Years). Others generally took O-Level at the end of the Fifth Year.

The Sixth General allowed pupils who had not got entirely satisfactory O-Level grades to improve their position.

The Sixth Lower and Sixth Upper provided a two-year course from O-Level standard to GCE A-Level, usually in three subjects plus General Studies A-Level (which proved not to be a "soft" subject).

The Sixth Senior had two functions:-

(1) It allowed people to improve on GCE A-Level grades obtained in the Upper Sixth.

(2) It allowed pupils, around November of the first term, to take entrance and scholarship examinations that were set by Oxford and Cambridge Colleges; this timing was in line with the then traditional expectations of at least the Oxford men's colleges, who made effectively final offers around the end of the term (unconditional or merely requiring Oxford's statutory minimum requirements). At Oxford, say, an applicant might just be offered a place or else might be offered a place with an award of £60/annum as a Scholar or £40/annum as a runner-up or Exhibitioner. (These awards amounted to a substantial supplement to the means-tested maintenance grants from Local Education Authorities given to university students in those days of £50-£370/annum, university fees being paid directly by the Authority. Oxford and Cambridge no longer operate this way.) Those pupils who had done a Fourth-to-Sixth-Lower jump could still arrive at university at a typical age of 18, despite having spent three years as Sixth-Formers.

Status. Wednesfield Grammar School was mixed boys and girls at a time when other grammar schools and the public schools were commonly single sex. The School was a maintained grammar school rather than a direct grant one.

1966 onwards. Because it was a maintained school, Wednesfield Grammar School had no option but to be comprehensivised if the local education authority wished, which is what occurred in 1969. Wednesfield Grammar School was merged with a secondary modern school in Lakefield Road (on a contiguous plot of land) to form one High School with a comprehensive intake, while Wards Bridge Secondary Modern School (also on Lichfield Road but on the other side of Lakefield Road) formed a second comprehensive school on its own. Mr White continued as the Headmaster of the first of these comprehensive schools. Mr White died only in October 2009, in his nineties, and was obituarised in the Wolverhampton Express and Star (obituary apparently no longer online).

Wednesfield Academy, the present-day successor, became a member of the Matrix Academy Trust on 1 January 2023. The head teacher/principal of the Academy is in September 2024 Mr Joe Phillips.

The Wards Bridge building existing in 1966 has been demolished.

Post script on Matthew Cooper. In 2023, Matthew Cooper wrote as follows, with clarifying matter (italicised) added by "M" based on the School Magazine: "Just writing to say that I Matthew Cooper was one of the second year pupils at the school in 1960-1961. We bussed to Wednesbury in 1959-60 before the Lichfield Road school was ready. I jumped the 5th form to go into 6th form in September 1963 after O-Level. Great times. I was Victor Ludorum 3 years in a row up to Sports Day on 11 July 1964. Left school to go to Carnegie College. Now been living in New Zealand for almost 50 years."
