= Portsmouth Cathedral =

Church in Hampshire, England

- Cathedral Church of St Thomas of Canterbury
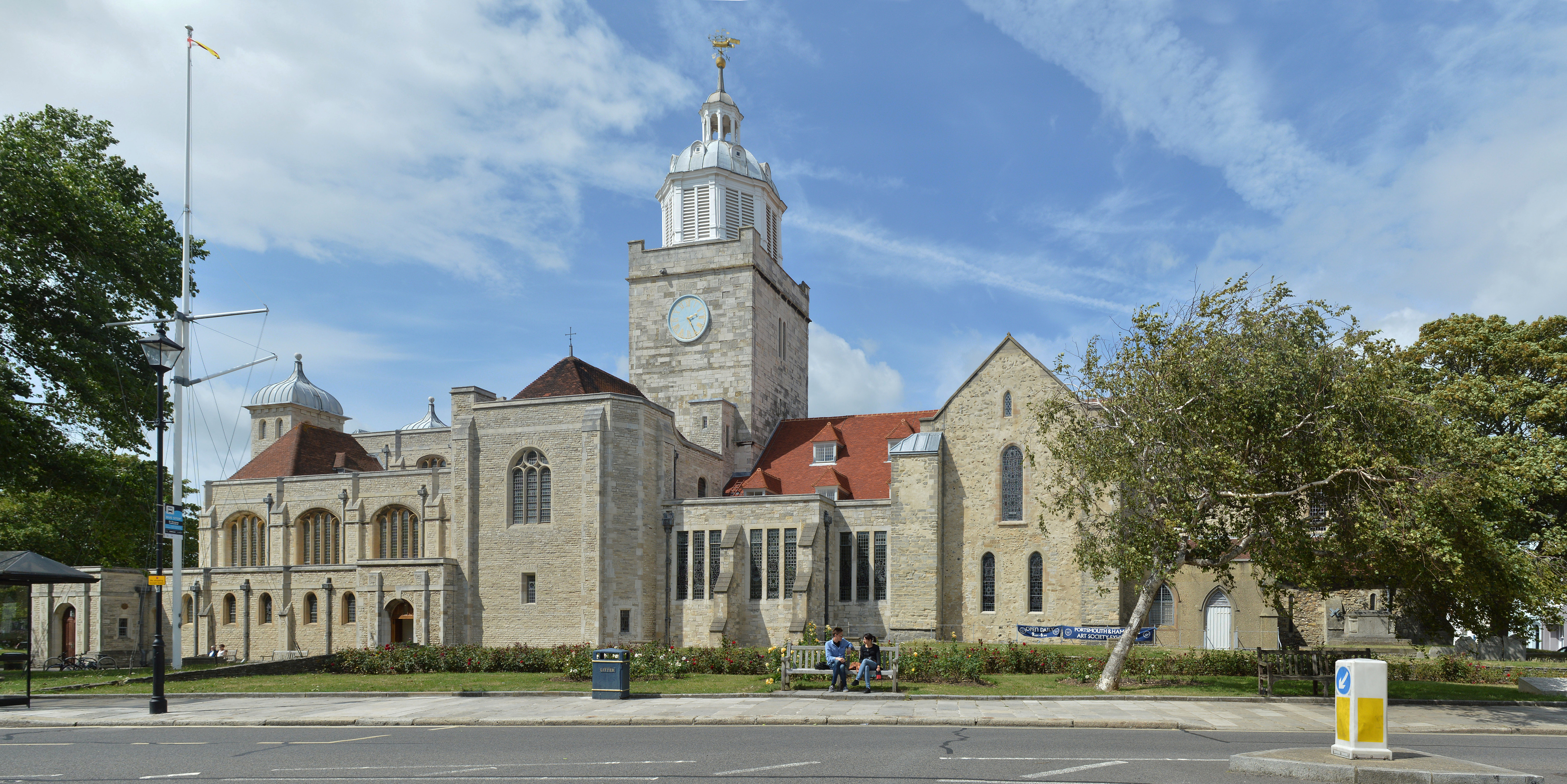
- Portsmouth Cathedral
- 50.7905°N 1.1043°W
- OS grid reference: SZ 63232 99381
- Location: Portsmouth, Hampshire
- Country: England
- Denomination: Church of England
- Previous denomination: Roman Catholic
- Website: www.portsmouthcathedral.org.uk

History
- Status: Cathedral
- Founded: 1180
- Dedication: St Thomas of Canterbury
- Dedicated: 1188

Architecture
- Functional status: Active
- Style: Romanesque (Germanic)
- Years built: 12th century (chapel); 17th century (rebuilt); 1980s–1991

Administration
- Province: Canterbury
- Diocese: Portsmouth

Clergy
- Bishop: Jonathan Frost
- Dean: Anthony Cane
- Canon Chancellor and Vice Dean: Harriet Neale-Stevens

The Cathedral Church of St Thomas of Canterbury, commonly known as Portsmouth Cathedral, is an Anglican cathedral church in the centre of Old Portsmouth in Portsmouth, England. Since 1935 the historic church has been the cathedral of the Diocese of Portsmouth and the seat of the Bishop of Portsmouth.

The Anglican cathedral is one of the two cathedral churches in the city, the other being the Roman Catholic Cathedral of St John the Evangelist, Portsmouth, about one mile to the north.

== History ==
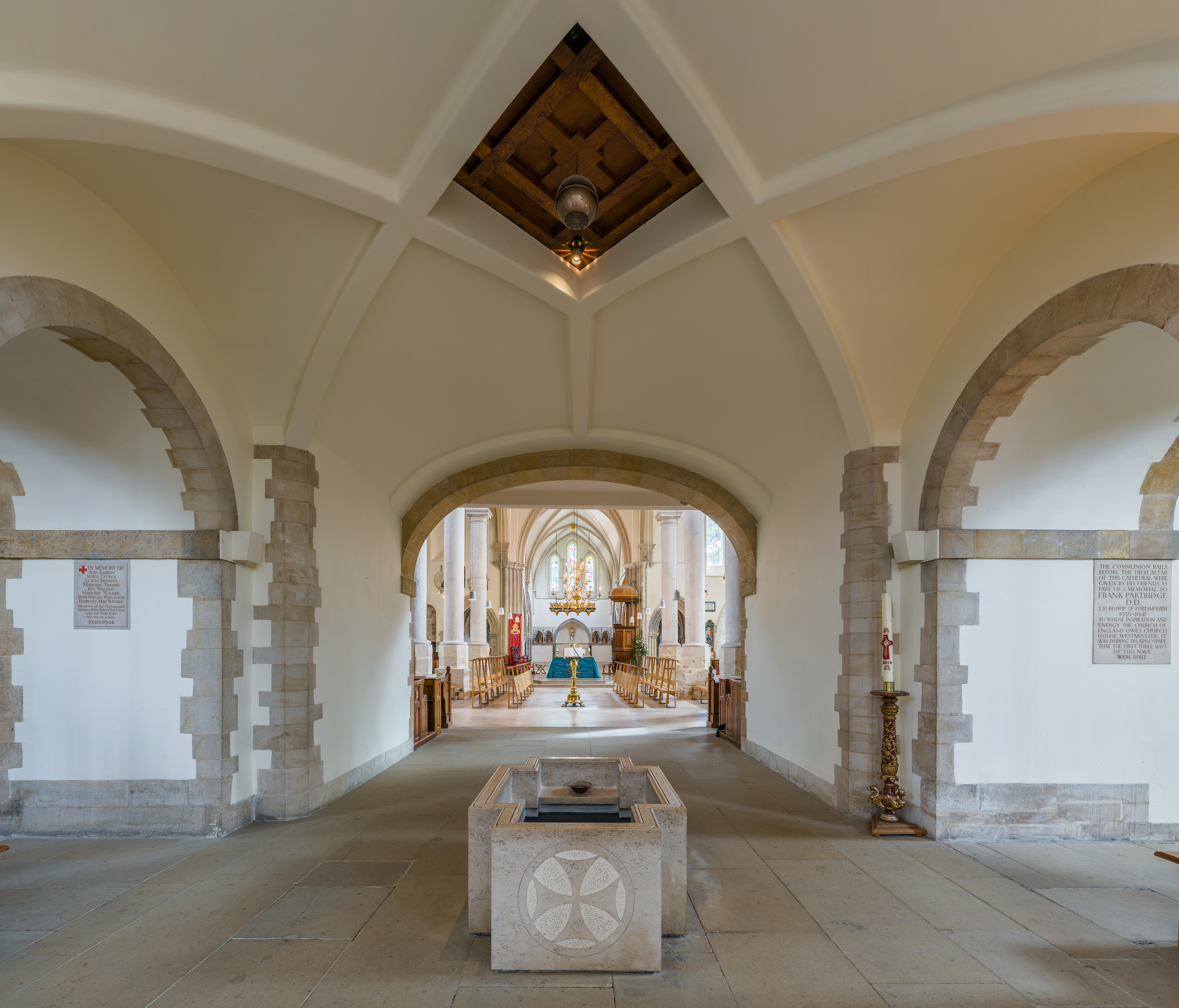
The font beneath the tower, part of the original medieval building

Around the year 1180, Jean de Gisors, a wealthy Norman merchant and Lord of the Manor of Titchfield, gave land in his new town of Portsmouth to the Augustinian canons of Southwick Priory so that they could build a chapel "to the Glorious Honour of the Martyr Thomas of Canterbury, one time Archbishop, on (my) land which is called Sudewede, the island of Portsea". It was given so that they could build a chapel dedicated to the honour of St Thomas of Canterbury, who was assassinated and martyred ten years earlier. This chapel was to become, in turn, a parish church in the 14th century and then a cathedral in the 20th century.

The medieval building, dedicated in 1188, was cruciform in shape, with a central tower, which was used as a lookout point and lighthouse, over the crossing. Of the original building, only the chancel and the transepts remain. The church survived a French raid in 1337 which had laid waste most of Portsmouth during the Hundred Years War. However, in 1449, Adam Moleyns, Bishop of Chichester, was murdered by local sailors. The town's inhabitants were excommunicated and the church was closed. The excommunication was lifted and the church reopened in 1508. In 1591, Elizabeth I worshipped in St Thomas's Church.

During the English Civil War, when the Parliamentary forces attacked the town in 1642, the Royalist garrison used the church tower to observe the movement of enemy forces. Parliamentary gunners positioned in Gosport fired on the tower and inflicted damage to the church. This resulted in the ruin of the medieval tower and nave. With the restoration of the monarchy in 1660 came the authorisation by Charles II for a collection in churches across the country to raise the £9,000 required to rebuild the tower and nave, which took place from 1683 to 1693. The nave was built in the classical style. Galleries were added in 1708 to cater for growing congregations, and were extended in 1750. The wooden cupola with a lantern for shipping was added to the top of the tower in 1703. A ring of eight bells was given at the same time. Two additional bells were cast in 1957 and currently the central tower contains a total of 12 bells. All of the bells were cast at Taylor's Bell Foundry and are hung in the wooden octagonal part of the tower. Various repairs and alterations were made during the eighteenth and nineteenth centuries. In 1902, the church was closed for two years so that much-needed work on the foundations could be carried out. During this period, St Mary's Colewort, a chapel of ease, served as the temporary parish church.

=== Cathedral ===
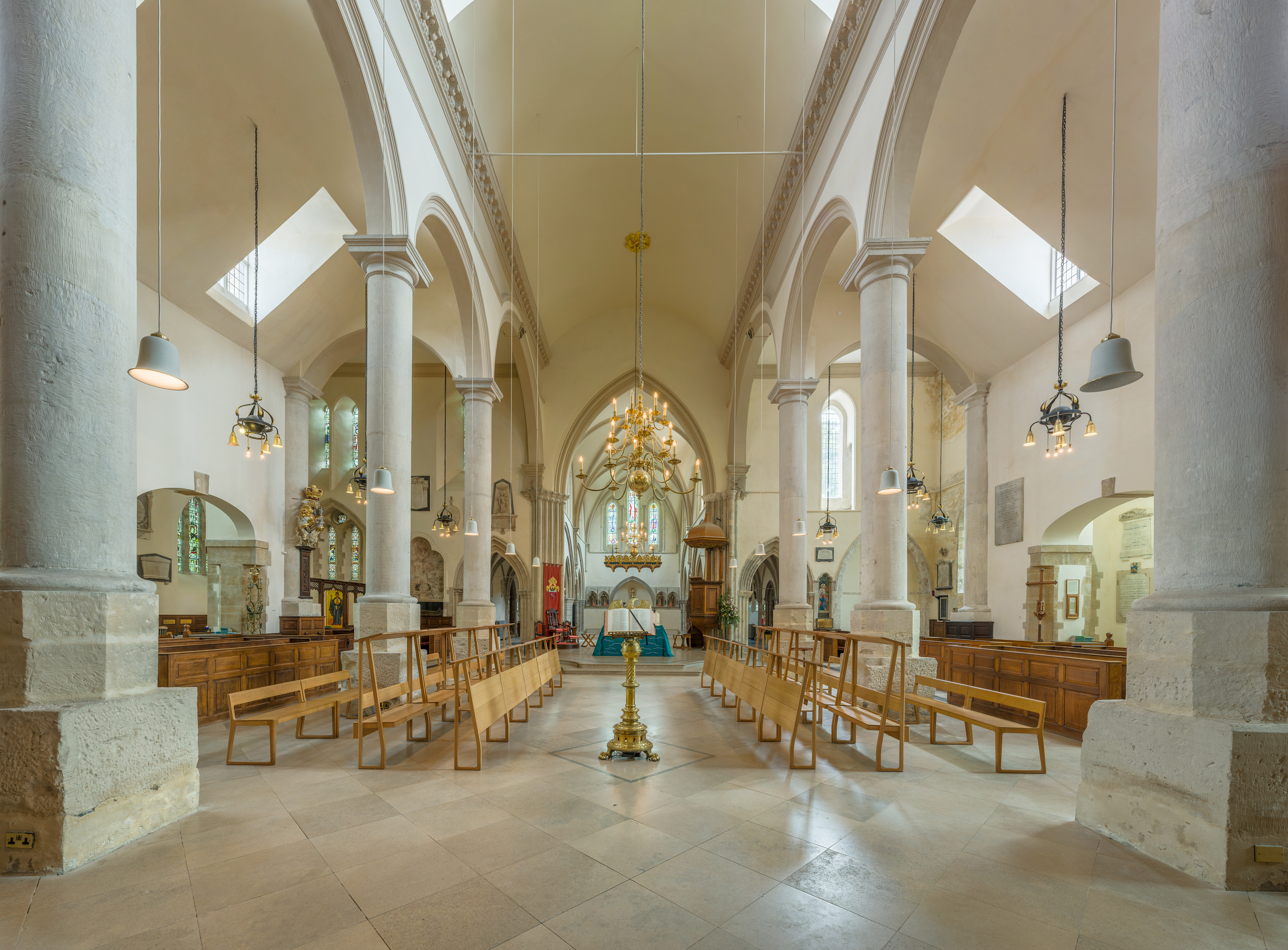
Quire

The establishment of the Diocese of Portsmouth out of part of the Diocese of Winchester in 1927 brought about significant changes. On 1 May of that year, the parish church of St Thomas of Canterbury became the pro-cathedral of the new diocese, becoming the second cathedral in Portsmouth, as the Roman Catholic Cathedral of St John the Evangelist had already opened in 1882. At a chapter meeting in October 1932, a first sketch plan for an extension to the church was submitted by Charles Nicholson. He was called upon to extend the church to a size that would dignify its cathedral status; by 1935 the "provisional" nature of its title had been dropped.

The style that Nicholson chose is that of a round-arched "Neo-Byzantine" style that echoed the "classical" style of the late seventeenth century quire. By 1939 the outer quire aisles, the tower, the transepts and three bays of the nave had been completed. The base of the seventeenth century tower had been opened up to form the tower arch. However, with the Fall of France in June 1940 during World War II, work on the extension scheme stopped and the bays of the nave were blocked off with a "temporary" brick wall. This wall remained there for over fifty years. During the Second World War, the Cathedral suffered minor damage to the windows and the roof. Nicholson died in 1949 and attempts headed by Bernard Montgomery to finish the structure in the 1960s proved unsuccessful due to substantive failure to find sufficient funds. Plans published in 1966 by Seely & Paget, with Pier Luigi Nervi as consulting engineer, envisaged a large semi-circular western extension 76 feet wide, constructed of reinforced concrete. The vast extension would have allowed for a congregation of 1,200 to have an interrupted view of the nave altar. However, as the building had been used for many years without its extension, it was quite usable and there was no urgency to finish the work. By the mid-1980s, however, the "temporary" brick wall was found to have become unstable and in danger of collapse, which made the completion work pressing. The task of the architects was to find a solution to the problem of finishing Nicholson's truncated nave: the nave was originally intended in the 1930s plans to be longer, in the traditional style of an English cathedral, but the changing needs of the diocese meant that the building was finally built with a foreshortened nave, the final west wall being located close to where the temporary structure had been. Efforts were started to raise the £3 million necessary to carry out the plans. Work began in January 1990 and eventually a fourth bay of the nave, western towers, tower rooms, rose window, gallery, ambulatory, together with the stone altar beneath Nicholson's tester and the new stone font were added. In November 1991, the completed building, much smaller than the original plans envisaged, was consecrated in the presence of Queen Elizabeth The Queen Mother.

== Architecture ==
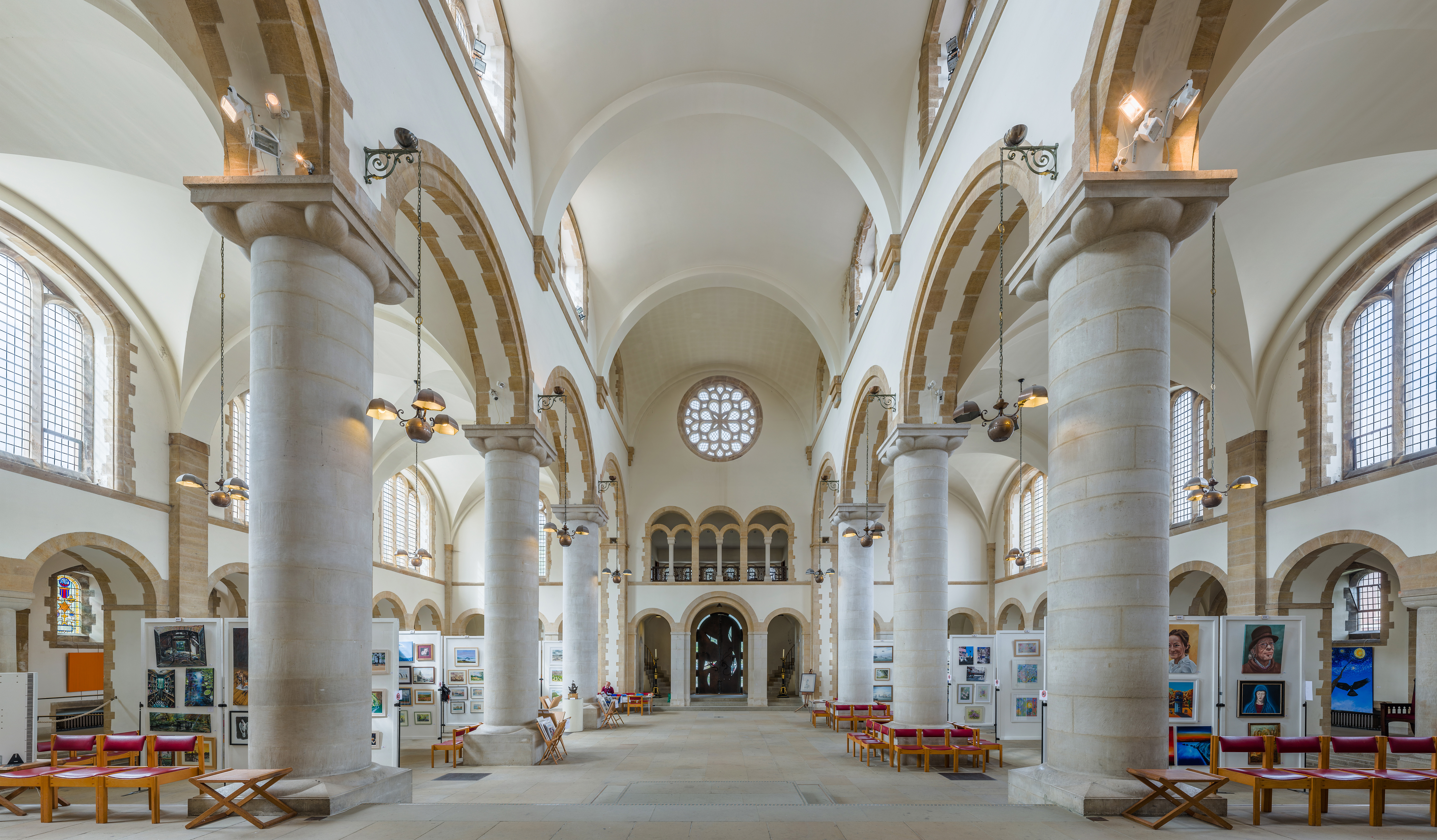
Nave looking west

The formal entrance into the cathedral is through the bronze west doors, designed by Bryan Kneale. The design is based on the tree of life, an ancient symbol representing the renewal of life. The completed nave is a square space that is enclosed by an outer ambulatory. The ambulatory is low and vaulted. Because the furniture in the nave is not fixed, it can be used for various means, including concerts and exhibitions as well as services. On the rood screen, beneath the nave organ case is a sculpture called Christus by Peter Eugene Ball. The nave organ case was designed by Didier Grassin in 2001; the inside of the panels were designed by Patrick Caulfield. The left side depicts night, with a stylised lighthouse shining on the sea (which alludes to the City of Portsmouth's motto, "Heaven's Light Our Guide"). The right door depicts day, showing the sun and the hull of a fishing boat.

The tower is pierced to provide an organ loft raised on a low dark passage. The font (1991), made to a Greek design of the ninth century, is placed centrally between the nave and the quire. In the south tower transept is the bronze statue of St John the Baptist by David Wynne. It was cast in 1951 as a memorial to a Winchester College pupil killed on the Matterhorn. On the north wall of the south tower transept is the painting The Miraculous Draught of Fishes by William Lionel Wyllie. The north tower transept contains a ceramic plaque of the Virgin and Child by the Florentine sculptor Andrea della Robbia. The principal altar stands on a podium of Purbeck stone, with mosaic work by Richard Noviss. The lectern was the gift of Edward VII in 1903. The pulpit was installed in 1693 and is all that remains of a three-decker pulpit. The organ case, built by Francis Bird, with carved figures of cherubs and King David playing his harp, belongs to the Nicholson Organ and bears the date 1718. Located in the south chancel aisle is a large 1631 memorial to George Villiers, 1st Duke of Buckingham, who was assassinated at the nearby Greyhound Inn.

In 1939, an extension of the Portsmouth Cathedral used granite from a quarry as far away as Pulau Ubin, Singapore, which was then a British colony.

== Music ==
Music department

The cathedral’s back row, made up of six choral scholars and six lay clerks, sing Evensong each day except Wednesdays and Saturdays, as well as a Sung Eucharist on Sunday mornings. Up to twenty boy choristers join the back row to sing Evensong on Tuesdays and Fridays. A girls’ choir, named Cantate, was established in 2006 to sing Evensong on Thursdays. Each Sunday, the boys’ and girls’ choirs alternate between singing Eucharist and Evensong. The Cathedral Consort is a mixed choir of adults and younger singers which sings Evensong on occasional Saturdays as well as for other services outside the regular pattern of worship. Often, the choirs combine to form the Great Choir, which usually sings for large services or special events.

The choirs regularly go on tour, with recent European visits including destinations such as Tallinn (Estonia), Stockholm (Sweden), Salzburg (Austria), Berlin (Germany), Gozo (Malta), Ypres (Belgium) and Notre Dame des Neiges in the Alpe d'Huez (France).

The Organist and Master of the Choristers, currently David Price, oversees the Music Department and is assisted by the Sub-Organist and Michael James Organ Scholar. Sachin Gunga was appointed as Sub-Organist in January 2018. The Michael James Organ Scholar is appointed annually and is open to gap year students either before or after university.

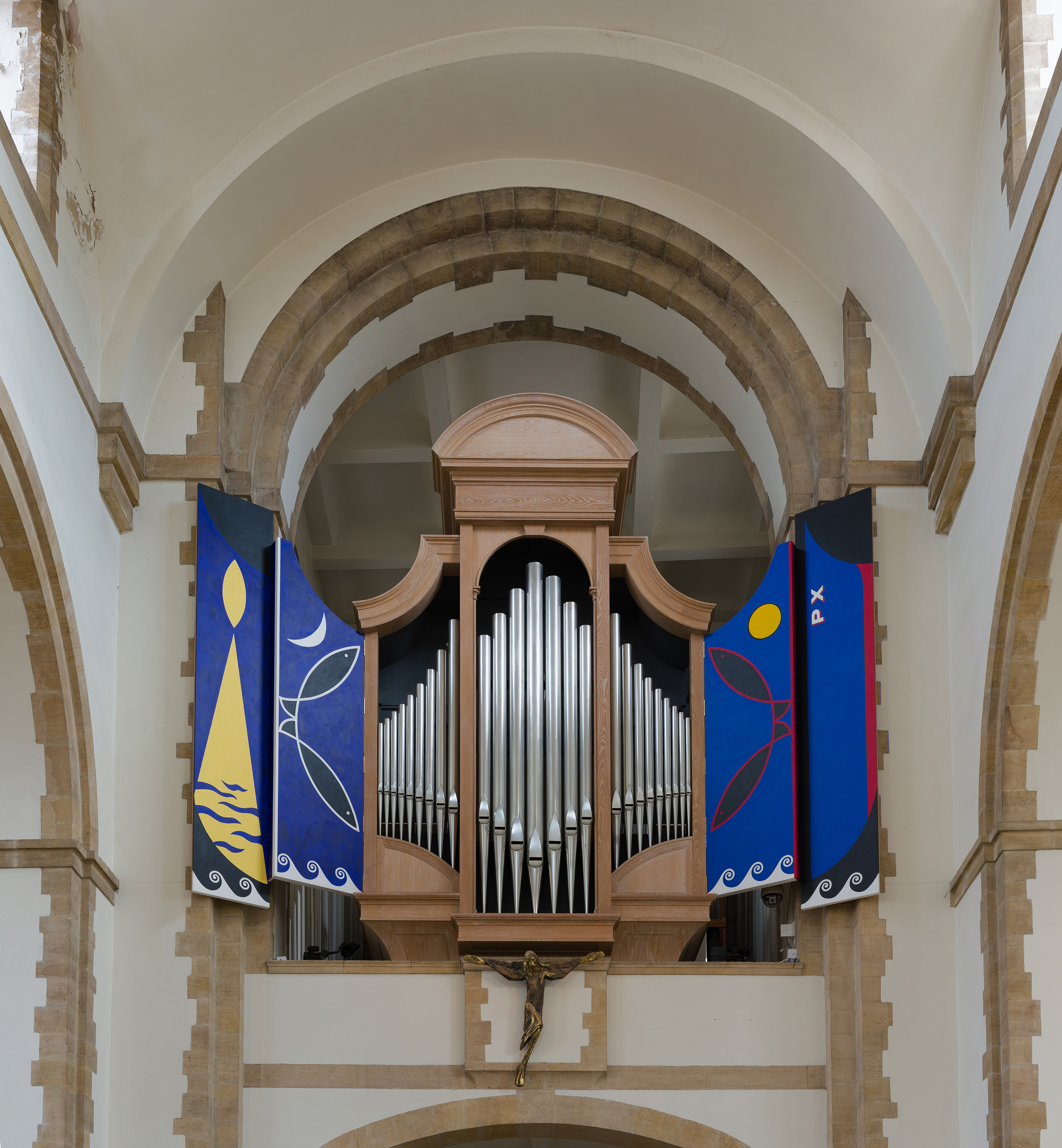
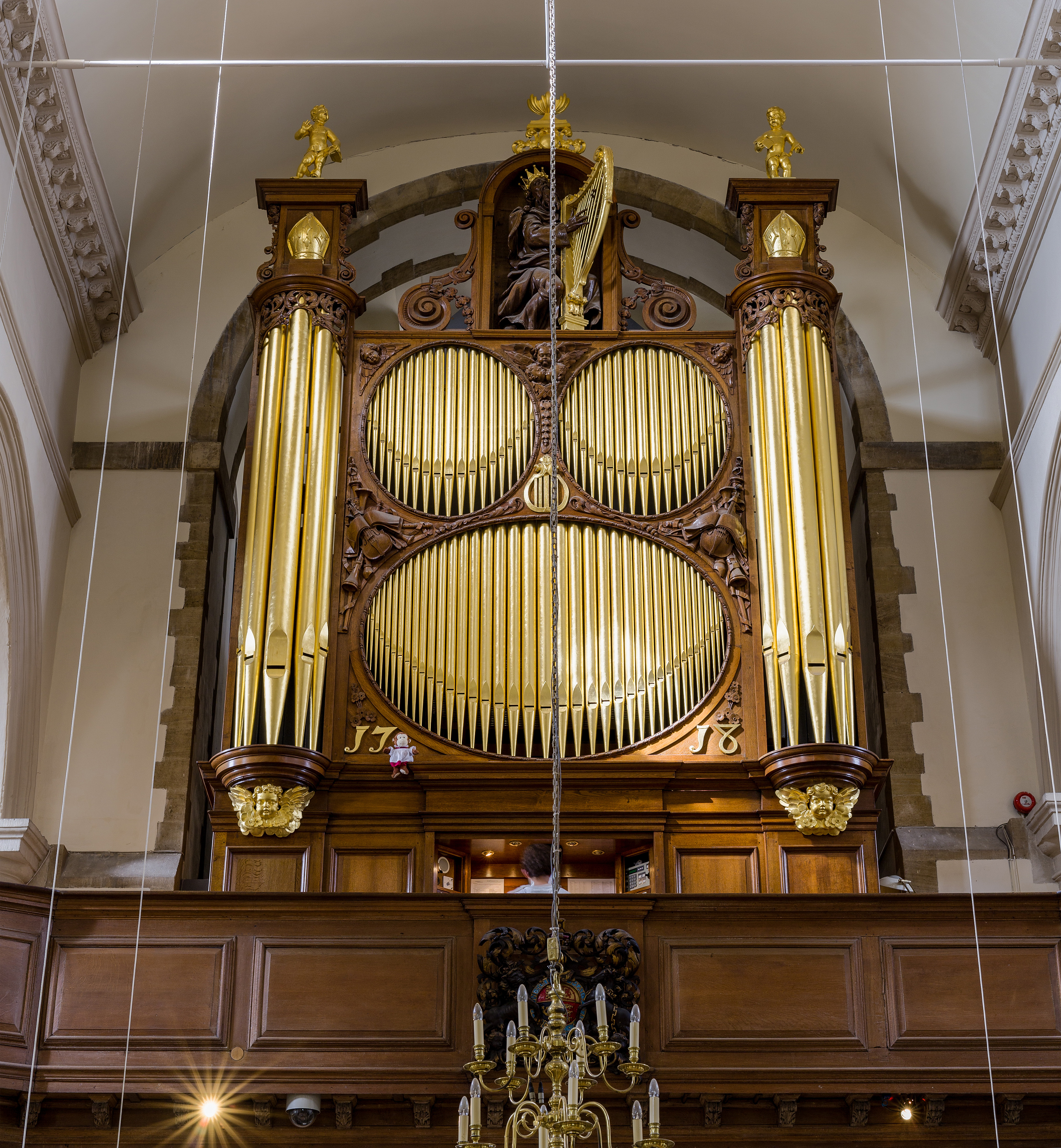
(L-R) The West Great Organ and the Nicholson Organ.

Cathedral organs

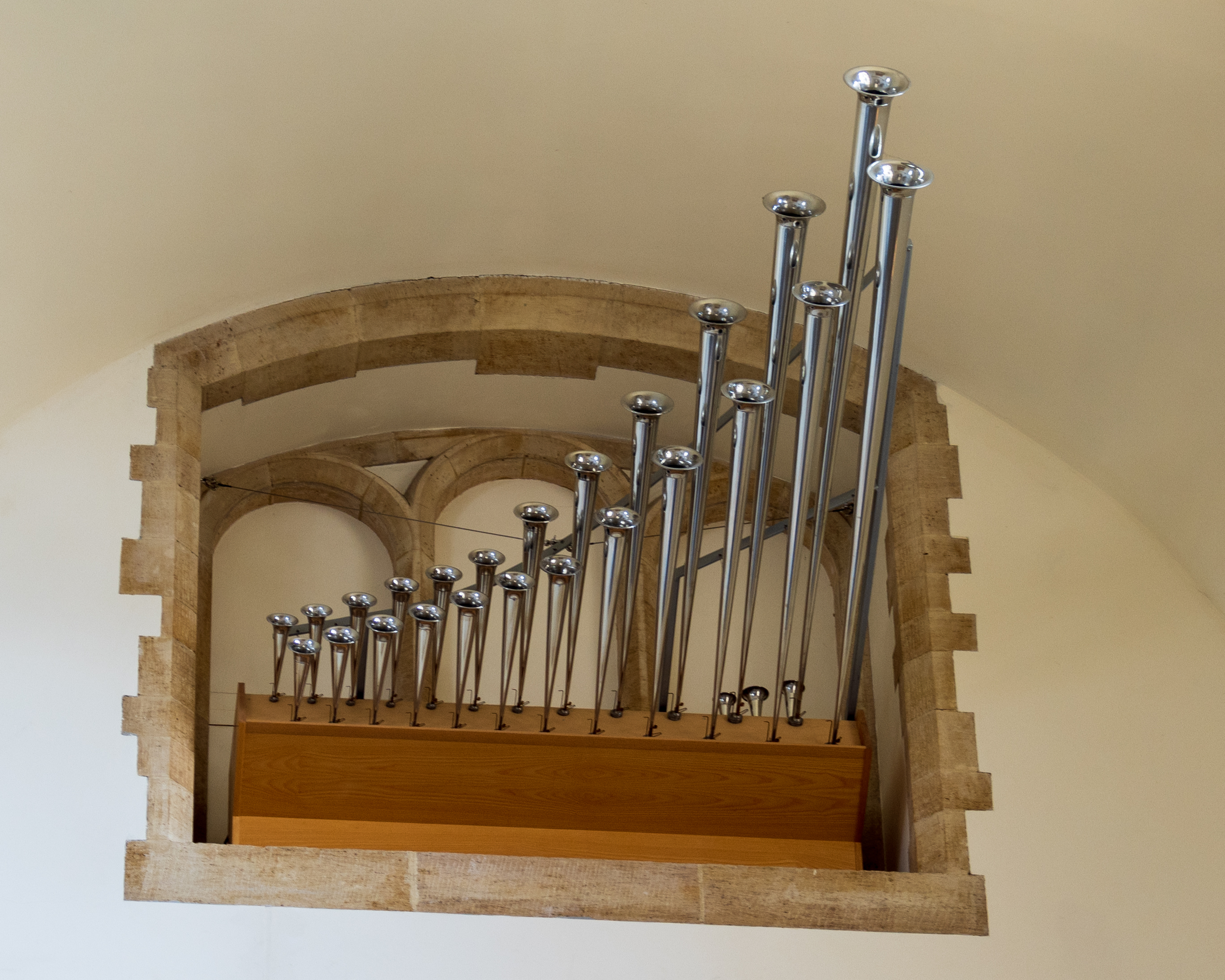
Trompete de Maris fanfare division

The cathedral's three-manual and pedal, forty-nine stop organ was installed in 1994 by Nicholson & Co Ltd. The pipes were taken from the John Nicholson organ of 1861 built for Manchester Cathedral, which had been relocated to Holy Trinity Church, Bolton, in 1874; it was rebuilt by Jardine & Co in 1905. In 2001, the West Great Organ was added, in order to provide music directly into the nave, which is a separated space. The renovated organ was officially inaugurated in November 2001, by a recital given by Olivier Latry, titular organist at Notre Dame de Paris. The doors of the West Great Organ were painted by Patrick Caulfield. Finally, in 2017, a horizontal Trompete de Maris ("Trumpet of the Sea") fanfare reed division above the main entrance was added.

In 2007, the cathedral introduced a single manual, three-stop chamber organ built by Kenneth Tickell & Co of Northampton.

== Dean and chapter ==
As of 30 December 2020:

- Dean – Anthony Cane (since 16 March 2019 installation)
- Canon Chancellor and Vice Dean – Harriet Neale-Stevens (since September 2023)
- Canon Precentor – Jo Spreadbury (since September 2015)
- Diocesan Director of Social Enterprise and Engagement (Diocesan Canon) – Nick Ralph (since 2009)

== See also ==
- List of cathedrals in the United Kingdom
- List of places of worship in Portsmouth
