= Sophie Jelley =

British Anglican bishop (born 1972)

The Right Reverend Sophie Jelley
- Bishop of Coventry
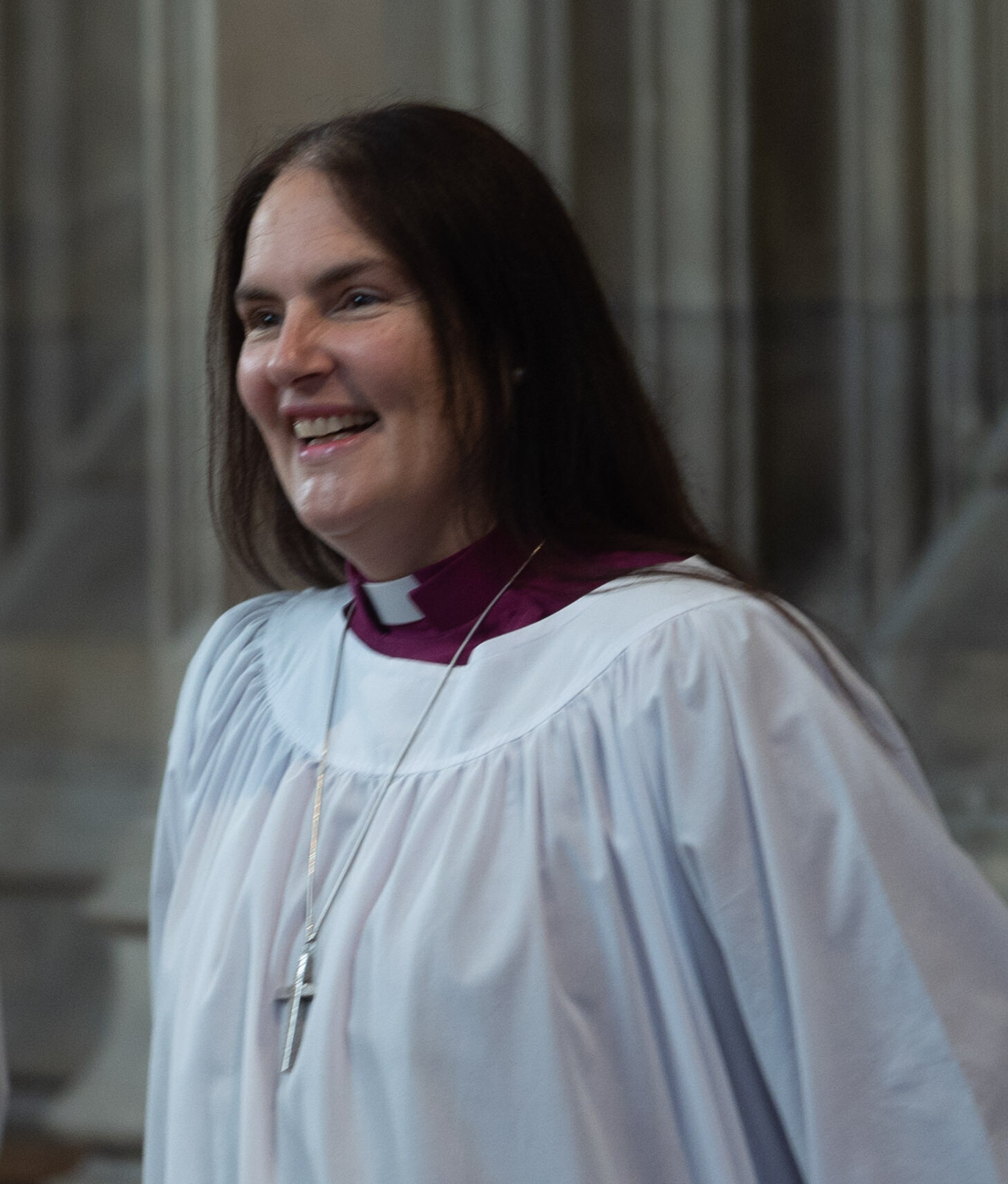
- Bishop Sophie in 2024
- Diocese: Diocese of Coventry
- In office: 2025–present
- Predecessor: Christopher Cocksworth
- Other post: Lord Spiritual (2025–present)
- Previous post: Bishop of Doncaster (2020–2025)

Orders
- Ordination: 1997 (deacon); 1998 (priest)
- Consecration: 21 September 2020 by Stephen Cottrell

Personal details
- Born: Sophie Rebecca Capitanchik; 1972 (age 53–54)
- Denomination: Anglican
- Spouse: Chris
- Children: 3
- Education: University of Leeds (BA); Wycliffe Hall, Oxford (MPhil)

Member of the House of Lords
- Lord Spiritual
- Bishop of Coventry; 4 September 2025

Sophie Rebecca Jelley (née Capitanchik; born 1972) is a British Anglican bishop. Since 2025, she has served as the Bishop of Coventry. She was previously the suffragan Bishop of Doncaster in the Diocese of Sheffield since 2020.

== Early life and education ==
Jelley was born in 1972, and was raised in Brighton, East Sussex, England. She studied theology and religious studies at the University of Leeds, graduating with a Bachelor of Arts (BA) degree in 1993. She trained for ordination at Wycliffe Hall, Oxford, and studied theology (specialising in Christian doctrine) at the University of Oxford, graduating with a Master of Philosophy (MPhil) degree in 1997.

== Ordained ministry ==
Jelley was ordained in the Church of England as a deacon in Bradford Cathedral in 1997. The following year, in 1998, she was ordained as a priest. From 1997 to 2000, she undertook her curacy at St Peter's Church, Shipley in the Diocese of Bradford. She then served in Uganda with the Church Mission Society, where she was based at the Uganda Christian University.

Previously, she served as Director of Mission, Discipleship and Ministry in the Diocese of Durham and Canon Missioner of Durham Cathedral since 2015. Before joining Durham, she ministered in the Dioceses of Bradford, Guildford and Chichester, and in Uganda with the Church Mission Society.

=== Episcopal ministry ===
In December 2019, it was announced that she would be the next Bishop of Doncaster, a suffragan bishop in the Diocese of Sheffield. She was due to be consecrated a bishop on Lady Day 2020 (25 March); but, due to the COVID-19 pandemic, she was instead licensed ad interim as "Bishop of Doncaster designate and Principal Commissary of the Bishop of Sheffield" that day. She was consecrated a bishop during a service on 21 September at York Minster: the principal consecrator was Stephen Cottrell, Archbishop of York, who was assisted by Paul Butler, Bishop of Durham and Pete Wilcox, Bishop of Sheffield.

On 4 November 2024, it was announced that Jelley had been appointed as the next Bishop of Coventry, to take up the position in spring 2025. She duly took up her See in the legal ceremony whereby her election was confirmed, on 14 February 2025 at Lambeth Palace; Sarah Mullally presided in her capacity as Dean of the Province of Canterbury. Under the provisions of the Lords Spiritual (Women) Act 2015, Jelley also immediately joined the House of Lords as one of the Lords Spiritual.
