= Peter Burrows =

British retired Anglican bishop

The Right Reverend Peter Burrows
- Bishop of Doncaster
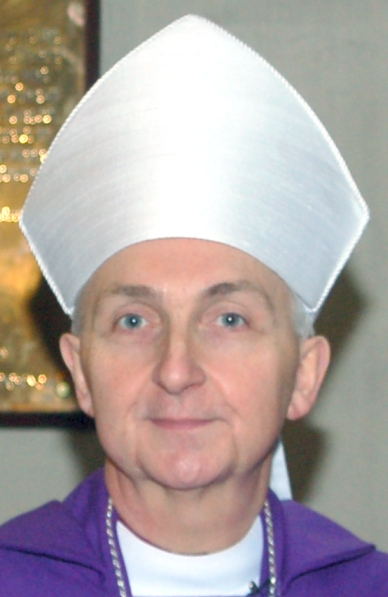
- Burrows in 2012
- Church: Church of England
- Diocese: Diocese of Sheffield
- In office: 2012 to 2019
- Predecessor: Cyril Ashton
- Successor: Sophie Jelley
- Other posts: Acting Bishop of Sheffield (2016–2017); Archdeacon of Leeds (2005–2012)

Orders
- Ordination: 1983 (deacon); 1984 (priest)
- Consecration: 2 February 2012 by John Sentamu

Personal details
- Born: 27 May 1955 (age 71) Derby, Derbyshire, England
- Denomination: Anglican
- Parents: Alfred & Eileen Burrows
- Spouse: Jane Allsop (m. 1975; died 2018)
- Children: two
- Profession: formerly health care and civil servant
- Education: University of Southampton; Sarum and Wells Theological College

Peter Burrows (born 27 May 1955) is a British retired Anglican bishop. He was the bishop of Doncaster — the sole suffragan bishop in the Church of England Diocese of Sheffield — from 2012 until his 2019 retirement; from July 2016 until June 2017, he was also the acting bishop of Sheffield.

== Early life ==
Burrows was born in Derby to Alfried and Eileen Burrows. He worked as a Nursing Assistant at Derbyshire Royal Infirmary from 1973 to 1976. From 1976, he was a civil servant, a clerical officer in the Department of Health and Social Security, until 1980, during which year he was awarded his BTh by the University of Southampton (as an external candidate).

== Ordained ministry ==
Burrows then studied for the Anglican ministry at Sarum and Wells Theological College, graduating and being ordained deacon in 1983. He then served his four-year title post as assistant curate at Baildon, one year into which he was ordained a priest. Burrows' first incumbency was as rector at Broughton Astley from 1987, during which time he was also Rural Dean of Guthlaxton First Deanery from 1994. His benefice was expanded in 1993 and he became team rector at Broughton Astley and Croft with Stoney Stanton.

In 1997, he became Director of Ordinands, and in 1998 an honorary Canon of Leicester Cathedral. In 2000, he left his incumbency to become Parish Development Officer in the Diocese of Leicester and in 2002 he became, additionally, deputy director of Ministry. In 2003, he vacated all of these roles to become Director of Ministry until 2005. He has also been an Inspector of Theological Colleges and has chaired Vocations and Ministry Committee.

In 2005, Burrows was appointed Archdeacon of Leeds (in the Diocese of Ripon and Leeds), where he chaired the Diocesan Ministry and Training Development Group. While in Leeds, he influenced the creation of three new Pioneer posts and an urban "Fresh Expression". He has also been a long-serving member of the General Synod and a Bishops' Adviser for Selection and Training.

=== Episcopal ministry ===
10 Downing Street announced on 6 October 2011 that Burrows had been nominated suffragan Bishop of Doncaster in the Diocese of Sheffield. He was duly consecrated an Anglican bishop at York Minster on 2 February and welcomed at Sheffield Cathedral on 5 February and at Doncaster Minster on 11 February 2012. Upon Steven Croft's translation from Sheffield to Oxford, Burrows became acting Bishop of Sheffield (episcopal commissary) for the ensuing vacancy. Burrows retired effective 30 September 2019.

== Personal life ==
He was married to Jane Susan Allsop from 1975 until her death in 2018. The couple had two adult children: one son, Adam and one daughter, Amie.

== Styles ==
For further information on forms of address ("styles") traditionally given to clergy of the Church of England, see Crockford's Clerical Directory and forms of address in the United Kingdom.
Regardless of their formal style(s), a person may choose which styles to use or not use.

- The Reverend Peter Burrows (1983–2005)
- The Venerable Peter Burrows (personal: 2005–2012)
- The Venerable The Archdeacon of Leeds (official: 2005–2012)
- The Right Reverend Peter Burrows (personal: 2012–present)
- The Right Reverend The Bishop of Doncaster (official: 2012–2019)

== Sources ==
- ‘BURROWS, Ven. Peter’, Who's Who 2012, A & C Black, 2012; online edition, Oxford University Press, December 2011 Accessed 29 March 2012
- ‘Bishop of Doncaster’, Diocese of Sheffield website, Diocese of Sheffield, 2012; sheffield.Anglican.org, March 2012 Accessed 29 March 2012
- ‘Suffragan Bishop of Doncaster’, Number 10 News, Number 10, 2011; number10.gov.uk, October 2011 Accessed 29 March 2012

Church of England titles
Preceded by John Oliver	Archdeacon of Leeds; 2005–2011	Succeeded by Paul Hooper
