= Cyril Ashton =

British Anglican bishop (born 1942)

The Right Reverend Cyril Ashton
- Bishop of Doncaster
- Church: Church of England
- Diocese: Diocese of Sheffield
- In office: 2000–2011
- Predecessor: Michael Gear
- Successor: Peter Burrows

Orders
- Ordination: 1967
- Consecration: 1 February 2000

Personal details
- Born: 6 April 1942 (age 84) Coxhoe, County Durham, United Kingdom
- Denomination: Anglican
- Spouse: Muriel
- Children: 4 children: Jonathan, Elizabeth, Simon & Timothy
- Education: Oak Hill Theological College / Lancaster University

Cyril Guy Ashton (born 6 April 1942) is a British Anglican bishop. From 2000 to 2011, he was the Bishop of Doncaster, a suffragan bishop in the Diocese of Sheffield.

== Career ==
Ashton trained for the Anglican ministry at Oak Hill Theological College, London, and began a curacy at St Thomas, Blackpool in 1967. He was then successively: Vocations Secretary to the Church Pastoral Aid Society (1970–1974); Vicar of St Thomas, Lancaster (1974–1991); and finally, before his elevation to the episcopate, was Director of Training for the Diocese of Blackburn (1991–2000).

During his 17 years’ incumbency at St Thomas Lancaster, Ashton developed a distinctive ministry in the charismatic renewal movement and encouraged the open use of charismatic gifts in the main Sunday services. In addition to the normal Anglican offices of the Parochial Church Council, Ashton also introduced an additional tier of church leaders who were styled as ‘elders’.

In 1986, he gained a Master of Arts (MA) degree at Lancaster University. He was made an honorary canon of Blackburn Cathedral in 1991. He was also the course director of the Post-Graduate Diploma at Cliff College, Derbyshire from 1995.

Ashton retired as Bishop of Doncaster on 13 July 2011, with a farewell service at St George's Minster, Doncaster.

As of September 2023 Ashton was chair of the Wigan Deanery Trust.

== Personal life ==
Ashton lists his recreations as motorcycling, vintage cars, swimming, cycling, music, wine, and walking, Ashton is married to Muriel and they have four adult children. Ashton and Muriel planned to retire in the Lancaster area.

== Books by Ashton ==
- Baptism: The Promise of God, Anglican Renewal Ministries, 1986
- Servant Spirit, Serving Church, Marshall Pickering, 1988
- Church on the Threshold: Renewing the Local Church, Darton, Longman & Todd Ltd, 1991 (co-authored with Bishop Jack Nicholls)
- Threshold God: Discovering Christ in the Margins of Life, Darton, Longman & Todd Ltd, 1992
- A Faith Worth Sharing?: A Church Worth Joining?, Darton, Longman & Todd Ltd, 1995

== Styles ==
- The Reverend Cyril Ashton (1967–1991)
- The Reverend Canon Cyril Ashton (1991–2000)
- The Right Reverend Cyril Ashton (2000–present)

Church of England titles
Preceded by Michael Gear	Bishop of Doncaster; 2000–2011	Succeeded by Peter Burrows
