= Simon Price (disambiguation) =

Simon Price is a British music journalist.

Simon Price or Pryce may also refer to:

- Simon Price (classicist) (1954–2011), English classical scholar
- Simon Pryce (born 1972), Australian musician and performer
