= Stuart Price (disambiguation) =

Stuart Price (born 1977) is a British electronic musician.

Stuart Price may also refer to:

- Stuart Hetley Price (1922–1977), English bishop
- Stu Price, character in The Hangover Trilogy
- Stuart Price (photographer) (born 1971), English photographer
- Stuart Matthew Price (born 1983), British actor and singer
