= William Persson =

British Anglican bishop (1927–2023)

The Rt Revd William Persson MA(Oxon)
- Bishop of Doncaster
- Diocese: Diocese of Sheffield
- In office: 1982–1992
- Predecessor: Stewart Cross
- Successor: Michael Gear
- Other post: Honorary assistant bishop in Bath & Wells (1994–2023)

Orders
- Ordination: 1953 (deacon); 1954 (priest)
- Consecration: 1982

Personal details
- Born: 27 September 1927
- Died: 2 April 2023 (aged 95)
- Denomination: Anglican
- Parents: Leslie & Elizabeth
- Spouse: Ann Davey (m. 1957)
- Children: 2 sons; 1 daughter
- Education: Oriel College, Oxford

William Michael Dermot Persson (27 September 1927 – 2 April 2023) was a British Anglican prelate who served as the Suffragan Bishop of Doncaster from 1982 to 1992.

Persson was educated at Oriel College, Oxford. Ordained in 1954, he began his career with a curacy at Emmanuel, South Croydon and was then successively: Vicar of Christ Church, Barnet; Rector of Bebington; and finally, before his elevation to the episcopate, Knutsford. After retiring to Sturminster Newton Bishop William continued to serve the church as an assistant bishop within the Bath and Wells Diocese.

Persson died on 2 April 2023, at the age of 95.

Church of England titles
Preceded by Stewart Cross	Bishop of Doncaster; 1982–1992	Succeeded by Michael Gear
