= Charles Claxton =

Charles Claxton may refer to:

- Charles Claxton (basketball) (born 1970), retired American basketball player
- Charles Claxton (bishop) (1903–1992), English bishop
