= David Lunn =

British Anglican bishop (1930–2021)

The Right Reverend David Lunn
- Bishop of Sheffield
- Diocese: Diocese of Sheffield
- In office: 1980–1997 (retired)
- Predecessor: Gordon Fallows
- Successor: Jack Nicholls
- Other post: Honorary assistant bishop in York (1998–2021)

Orders
- Ordination: 1955 (deacon); 1956 (priest)
- Consecration: c. 1980

Personal details
- Born: July 17, 1930
- Died: 19 July 2021 (aged 91)
- Denomination: Anglican
- Education: King's College, Cambridge

David Ramsay Lunn (17 July 1930 – 19 July 2021) was a British Anglican bishop. From 1980 to 1997, he was Bishop of Sheffield in the Church of England.

Lunn was born on Tyneside and educated at the Kings School, Tynemouth, where he was head boy in 1947, and King's College, Cambridge.

An Anglo-Catholic, he was opposed to the ordination of women, seeing it as an issue that needed examination at an ecumenical level. During his episcopacy, he oversaw an increase in lay ministry within the diocese, but also increased the number of clergy and improved the diocese's financial position. The period also saw the creation of the Nine O'Clock Service within one of the diocese's churches. Initially this seemed to be a successful attempt to broaden the appeal of the church, but in the end the project collapsed and required strong leadership from Lunn to heal the resulting wounds. Following the Hillsborough Disaster, he implemented the clergy disaster plan to improve the church's response to such disasters in future.

In 1997 Lunn was awarded an honorary LL.D. degree by Sheffield University. After retirement, during which he settled at Wetwang, he became an assistant bishop in the Diocese of York in 1998.

== Works ==
Lunn wrote a multi-volume history of the area covered by the diocese including Rivers, Rectors and Abbots and Kings, Canals and Coal.

A keen gardener, he also wrote the booklet Roses Wild: A little book by the Bishop of Sheffield concerning the roses in his garden at Bishopscroft.

Religious titles
Preceded by Gordon Fallows	Bishop of Sheffield; 1980–1997	Succeeded by Jack Nicholls
