= St Peter, Greenhill =

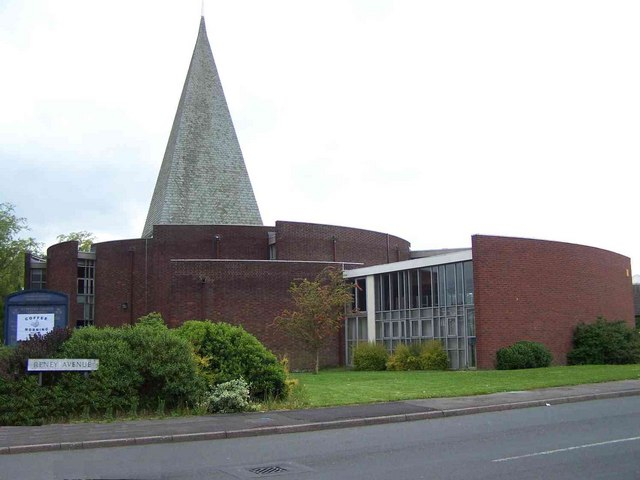

- 53.350°N 1.473°W
- Denomination: Church of England
- Churchmanship: Broad Church
- Website: saintpeters.co

History
- Dedication: St. Peter

Architecture
- Heritage designation: Grade II
- Architectural type: Church
- Style: Modern
- Completed: 1965

Administration
- Province: York
- Diocese: Sheffield

Clergy
- Vicar: Revd Ben Shires

St Peter's Greenhill is a Parish Church in the Church of England Diocese of Sheffield located in the Greenhill area of the city.

The church was built between 1964 and 1965 to serve the housing development that was built at what was then the edge of Sheffield. Prior to the construction of the church, the local population were served by the church of St James, Norton. The church was designed by Oxley and Bussey, and it was consecrated by the Bishop of Derby in May 1965.

The church was designated a Grade II listed building in 1999.
