= Michael Gear (bishop) =

Bishop of Doncaster

The Rt Revd Michael Gear BA DipTh
- Bishop of Doncaster
- Diocese: Diocese of Sheffield
- In office: 1993–1999
- Predecessor: William Persson
- Successor: Cyril Ashton
- Other posts: Honorary assistant bishop in Canterbury (2000–2018) and in Rochester (1999–2018)

Orders
- Ordination: 1961 (deacon); c. 1962 (priest)
- Consecration: 1993

Personal details
- Born: 27 November 1934
- Died: 26 January 2018 (aged 83)
- Denomination: Anglican
- Parents: Frederick & Lillian
- Spouse: Daphne Earl (m. 1961)
- Children: 2 daughters
- Education: St John's College, Durham

Michael Frederick Gear (27 November 1934 – 26 January 2018) was Suffragan Bishop of Doncaster.

Gear was educated at St John's College, Durham. Ordained in 1961, he began his career with a curacy at Christ Church, Bexleyheath was then Vicar of St Andrew, Clubmore, Liverpool; Rector of Avondale, Harare; Rural Dean of Macclesfield; and finally, before his elevation to the episcopate, Archdeacon of Chester. Since retiring to Maidstone Bishop Michael continued to serve the church as an assistant bishop within Canterbury diocese and a trustee of a charity for Zimbabwean street children.

He died on 26 January 2018 at the age of 83.

Church of England titles
Preceded by William Persson	Bishop of Doncaster; 1993–1999	Succeeded by Cyril Ashton
