= Pete Wilcox =

British Anglican bishop and Lord Spiritual (born 1961)

The Right Reverend Dr Peter Wilcox
- Bishop of Sheffield
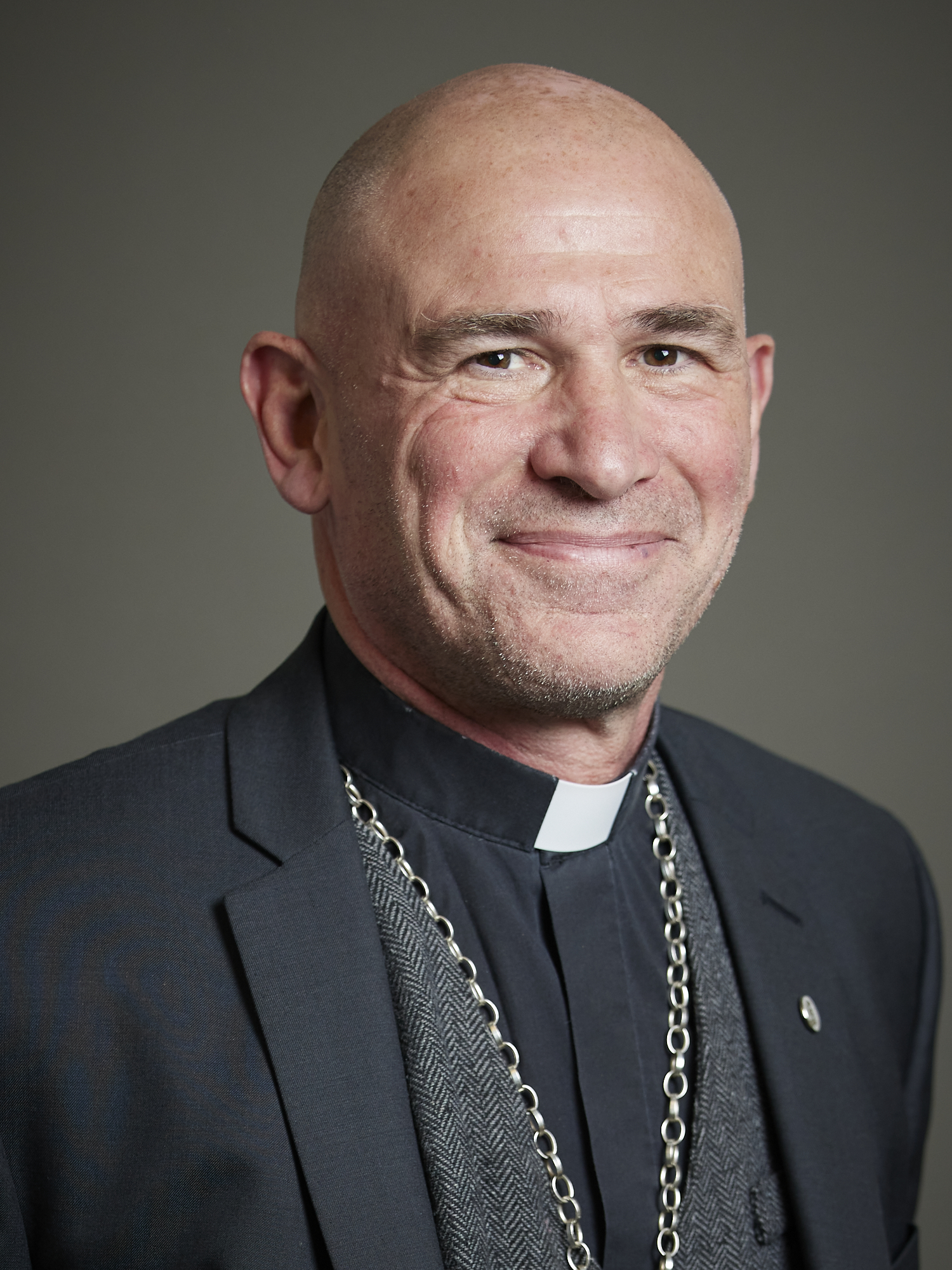
- Official portrait, 2023
- Church: Church of England
- Diocese: Diocese of Sheffield
- In office: 5 June 2017 – present
- Predecessor: Steven Croft
- Previous post: Dean of Liverpool (2012–2017)

Orders
- Ordination: 1987 (deacon); 1988 (priest) by David Jenkins
- Consecration: 22 June 2017 by John Sentamu

Personal details
- Born: Peter Jonathan Wilcox; 10 October 1961 (age 65)
- Denomination: Anglicanism
- Residence: Bishopscroft, Ranmoor
- Spouse: Catherine Fox
- Children: Two
- Education: St John's College, Durham; Ridley Hall, Cambridge; St John's College, Oxford

Member of the House of Lords
- Lord Spiritual
- Bishop of Sheffield; 14 March 2023

Peter Jonathan Wilcox (born 10 October 1961) is a British Anglican bishop. Since June 2017, he has been the bishop of Sheffield in the Church of England. He was previously the dean of Liverpool from 2012 to 2017.

== Early life and education ==
Wilcox was born on 10 October 1961 and attended Worksop College in north Nottinghamshire before studying at Durham University where he was a member of St John's College. He graduated from Durham with a Bachelor of Arts (BA) degree in 1984. He then attended Ridley Hall, Cambridge, where he trained for ordination and graduated from the University of Cambridge with a BA degree in theology in 1986. Later, he returned to Durham for post-graduate study and completed a Master of Arts (MA) degree in 1991. He then attended St John's College, Oxford, and completed a Doctor of Philosophy (DPhil) degree in 1993. His doctoral thesis was titled "Restoration, Reformation and the progress of the kingdom of Christ: evangelisation in the thought and practice of John Calvin, 1555–1564".

== Ordained ministry ==
He was ordained a deacon at Petertide (28 June) 1987 and a priest the next Petertide (26 June 1988) — both times by Bishop David Jenkins at Durham Cathedral; his first post was a curacy in Preston-on-Tees. From 1990 to 1993, while undertaking post-graduate study, he was a non-stipendiary minister at St Giles' Church, Oxford, and St Margaret's Church, Oxford. He was team vicar of Gateshead from 1993 to 1998 when he became the director of the Urban Mission Centre, Cranmer Hall, Durham. He was priest in charge of St Paul's Walsall from 1998 before becoming the canon chancellor of Lichfield Cathedral in 2006. He was installed as the dean of Liverpool Cathedral on 15 September 2012.

=== Episcopal ministry ===
On 7 April 2017, it was announced that Wilcox was to become the next bishop of Sheffield, to be consecrated on 22 June and take up the role in autumn 2017. He was elected to the see by the college of canons of Sheffield Cathedral on 5 May 2017 and his election confirmed at York Minster on 5 June 2017. On 22 June 2017, he was consecrated a bishop by Archbishop John Sentamu at York Minster. On 23 September 2017, he was installed as the bishop of Sheffield during a service at Sheffield Cathedral.

Wilcox is a trustee of Ridley Hall, Cambridge, where he trained for ordination.

On 17 January 2023, Wilcox was admitted to the House of Lords as a Lord Spiritual.

In July 2025, the Government announced that Wilcox would serve as Chair of the upcoming state inquiry into the events surrounding the 1984 Battle of Orgreave during the 1984–85 miners' strike.

=== Views ===
In 2023, following the news that the House of Bishop's of the Church of England was to introduce proposals for blessing same-sex relationships, he signed an open letter which stated:

many Christians in the Church of England and the Anglican Communion, together with Christians from across the churches of world Christianity, continue to believe that marriage is given by God for the union of a man and woman and that it cannot be extended to those who are of the same sex. [...] Without seeking to diminish the value of many committed same-sex relationships, for which there is much to give thanks, we find ourselves constrained by what we sincerely believe the Scriptures teach which cannot be set aside.

He voted against introducing "standalone services for same-sex couples" on a trial basis during a meeting of the General Synod in November 2023; the motion passed.

== Personal life ==
Wilcox is married to Catherine Fox, a writer and a lecturer at Manchester Metropolitan University. They have two children.

In 2017, Wilcox was diagnosed with and treated for colon cancer. This resulted in a permanent colostomy but Wilcox otherwise made a full recovery.

== Styles ==
- The Reverend Pete Wilcox (1988–1993)
- The Reverend Doctor Pete Wilcox (1993–2006)
- The Reverend Canon Doctor Pete Wilcox (2006–2012)
- The Very Reverend Doctor Pete Wilcox (2012 – 5 June 2017)
- The Reverend Doctor Pete Wilcox (5 June 2017 – 22 June 2017)
- The Right Reverend Doctor Pete Wilcox (22 June 2017 – present)

Church of England titles
Preceded by Justin Welby	Dean of Liverpool; 2012–2017	Succeeded by Sue Jones
Preceded by Steven Croft	Bishop of Sheffield; 2017–present	Incumbent
