= Robert Martineau =

British Anglican bishop

Robert Arnold Schürhoff Martineau (22 August 1913 – 28 June 1999) was a British bishop who was the first Bishop of Huntingdon and who was later translated to Blackburn.

Born in Birmingham and educated at King Edward's School and Trinity Hall, Cambridge, he was ordained in 1938. His first post was as a curate at Melksham after which he was a World War II chaplain in the RAFVR.

When peace returned he became Vicar of Ovenden, Halifax, and then Allerton, Merseyside, before his ordination to the episcopate.

He died in Denbigh, Clwyd.

Church of England titles
Preceded by Inaugural appointment	Bishop of Huntingdon; 1965 – 1972	Succeeded by Eric St Quintin Wall
Preceded by Charles Robert Claxton	Bishop of Blackburn; 1972 – 1981	Succeeded by David Stewart Cross
