= Alan Chesters =

The Right Reverend Alan Chesters
- Bishop of Blackburn
- Church: Church of England
- Diocese: Diocese of Blackburn
- Installed: c. 1989
- Term ended: 2003 (retirement)
- Predecessor: Stewart Cross
- Successor: Nicholas Reade
- Other posts: Honorary assistant bishop in Southwark and in Chichester; 2011–present Honorary assistant bishop in Chester; 2003–2010; Honorary assistant bishop in Europe; 2003–present Archdeacon of Halifax; 1985–1989

Orders
- Ordination: 1962 (deacon); 1963 (priest)
- Consecration: 24 April 1989

Personal details
- Born: 26 August 1937 (age 89)
- Denomination: Anglican
- Parents: Herbert & Catherine Chesters
- Education: St Chad's College, Durham

Member of the House of Lords
- Lord Spiritual
- Bishop of Blackburn; 12 December 1995 – 31 August 2003

Alan David Chesters CBE (born 26 August 1937) was the Bishop of Blackburn from 1989 to 2003.

== Early life and education ==
Chesters is the son of Herbert and Catherine Chesters, of Huddersfield, West Yorkshire. He was educated at Elland Grammar School, St Chad's College, Durham (Bachelor of Arts, 1959), St Catherine's Society, Oxford (Bachelor of Arts, 1961), Oxford Master of Arts (1965) and St Stephen's House, Oxford (1959–1962). He was ordained deacon in 1962, priest in 1963 and bishop in 1989.

== Ministry ==
Chesters served as assistant curate of St Anne's Wandsworth from 1962 to 1965. He then became chaplain of Tiffin School (1966–72), a post that he soon combined with that of honorary assistant curate of St Richard's Ham (1967–72). Returning to the north of England, where he was to spend the rest of his ministry, he became director of education for the Diocese of Durham and rector of Brancepeth (1972–85).

He was an honorary canon of Durham Cathedral from 1975 until 1984. In 1985, he was appointed Archdeacon of Halifax in the Diocese of Wakefield. In 1989, the Queen appointed him Bishop of Blackburn on the advice of the Prime Minister, Margaret Thatcher. He took his seat in the House of Lords in 1995.

He retired in 2003, and became an honorary assistant bishop in the dioceses of Chester and Gibraltar in Europe. He moved from the diocese of Chester in 2010, ceasing to be an assistant bishop in Chester, remaining one in Europe and becoming one in Southwark (where he lives) and Chichester.

Chesters was a Church Commissioner from 1982 until 1998. He was first elected to the General Synod in 1975. He was a member of its standing committee from 1985 to 1989 and 1990 to 1995, and served as vice chairman (1984–90), and later chairman, of the Board of Education. and Chairman of the Schools Committee. In October 2000, Chesters officially opened an extension at a school in Oswaldtwistle.

His involvement in Anglican education continued as he became a member of the board of governors of his old college at Durham, St Chad's (1980–89), and chairman of the board of governors of St Martin's College (1991–2003). In 2003, he was appointed to St Martin's College's first honorary fellowship.

He has also been chairman of the Higher Education Funding Council for England Advisory Committee on Church Colleges and president of the Woodard Corporation.

== Memberships and honours ==
Chesters was a member of the Countryside Commission, and chairman of the North West Rural Affairs Forum. In the New Year Honours List 2007, he was appointed a Commander of the Most Excellent Order of the British Empire, for services to the community in the North West. He was awarded an Honorary Fellowship in 2007 from the University of Cumbria.

== Sources ==
- Bishop dices with casino future, BBC News (26 February 2002)
- SMC awards Honorary Fellowship to Bishop of Blackburn (15 January 2004)
- Trinity Foundation for Christianity and Culture
- Glyn Paflin, Honours for work with children and families, Church Times
- Gerrard and Hatton head honours, BBC News (30 December 2006)
- Debrett's People of Today
- Crockford's Clerical Directory
