= Leah Vasey-Saunders =

British bishop (born 1977)

The Right Reverend Leah Vasey-Saunders
- Bishop of Doncaster
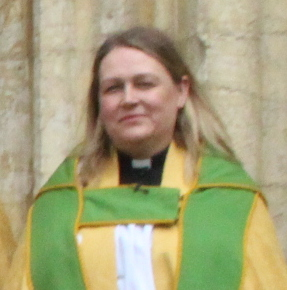
- Vasey-Saunders in 2025
- Diocese: Diocese of Sheffield
- In office: 2025 to present
- Previous post: Vicar of Lancaster Priory (2021–2025)

Orders
- Ordination: 2003 (deacon); 2004 (priest)
- Consecration: 16 September 2025 by Stephen Cottrell

Personal details
- Born: 1977 (age 48–49)
- Denomination: Anglicanism
- Education: University of Huddersfield; St John's College, Durham; Cranmer Hall, Durham

Leah Vasey-Saunders (born 1977) is a British Anglican bishop. Since 2025, she has served as the Bishop of Doncaster (sole suffragan bishop of the Diocese of Sheffield).

== Early life and education ==
Leah was born in 1977. She studied music at the University of Huddersfield, graduating with a Bachelor of Music (BMus) degree in 1998. She trained for ordained ministry at Cranmer Hall, Durham, during which she studied theology at St John's College, Durham and graduated from the University of Durham with a Bachelor of Arts (BA) degree in 2003.

== Ordained ministry ==
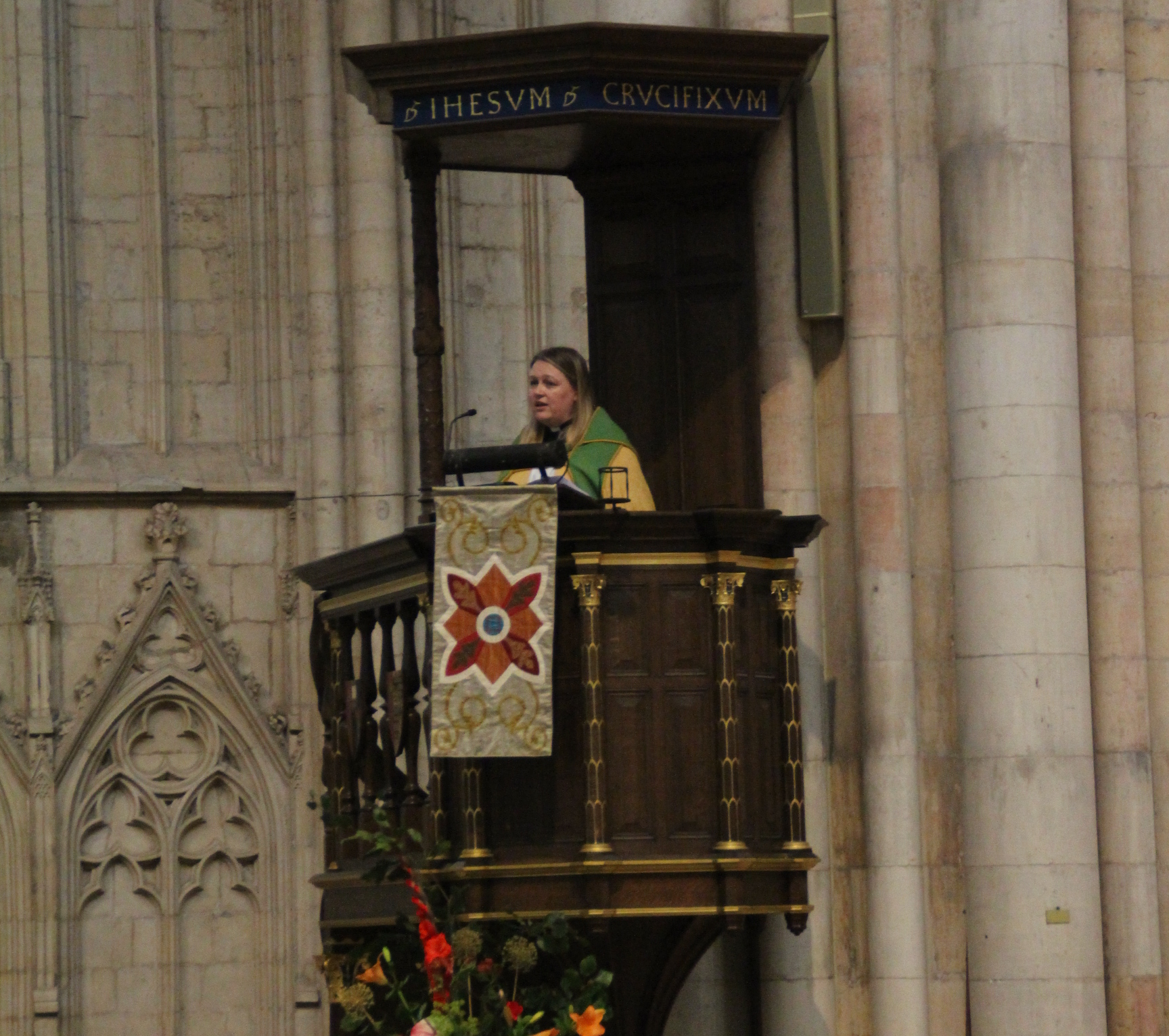
Vasey-Saunders preaching in York Minster, 2025

She was ordained in the Church of England as a deacon in 2003; and as a priest in 2004. She served her title at St John the Evangelist, Whorlton. She served a further curacy at St George, Newcastle upon Tyne.

From 2008 to 2010 she was team vicar of St John's Heath Hayes, then part of the Cannock Team Ministry and concurrently curate of St Peter, Hednesford. She became the first vicar of the new parish of St John, Heath Hayes in 2010. From 2013 she was Priest-in-Charge of All Saints, Harworth and Bircotes. From 2016 to 2021 she was Canon Precentor of Wakefield Cathedral.

In addition to her parish ministry, she is chair of On Fire Mission, a network "promoting charismatic and Catholic renewal" within the Church of England.

=== Episcopal ministry ===
On 29 May 2025, it was announced that Vasey-Saunders would be the next Bishop of Doncaster, a suffragan bishop in the Diocese of Sheffield. She was consecrated into bishop's orders on 16 September 2025, by Stephen Cottrell, Archbishop of York, at York Minster.

== Personal life ==
A keen musician, she is married to the Revd Dr Mark Vasey-Saunders: they have four children.
