= Bishop of Blackburn =

Ordinary of the Church of England's Diocese of Blackburn

- Bishopric

anglican
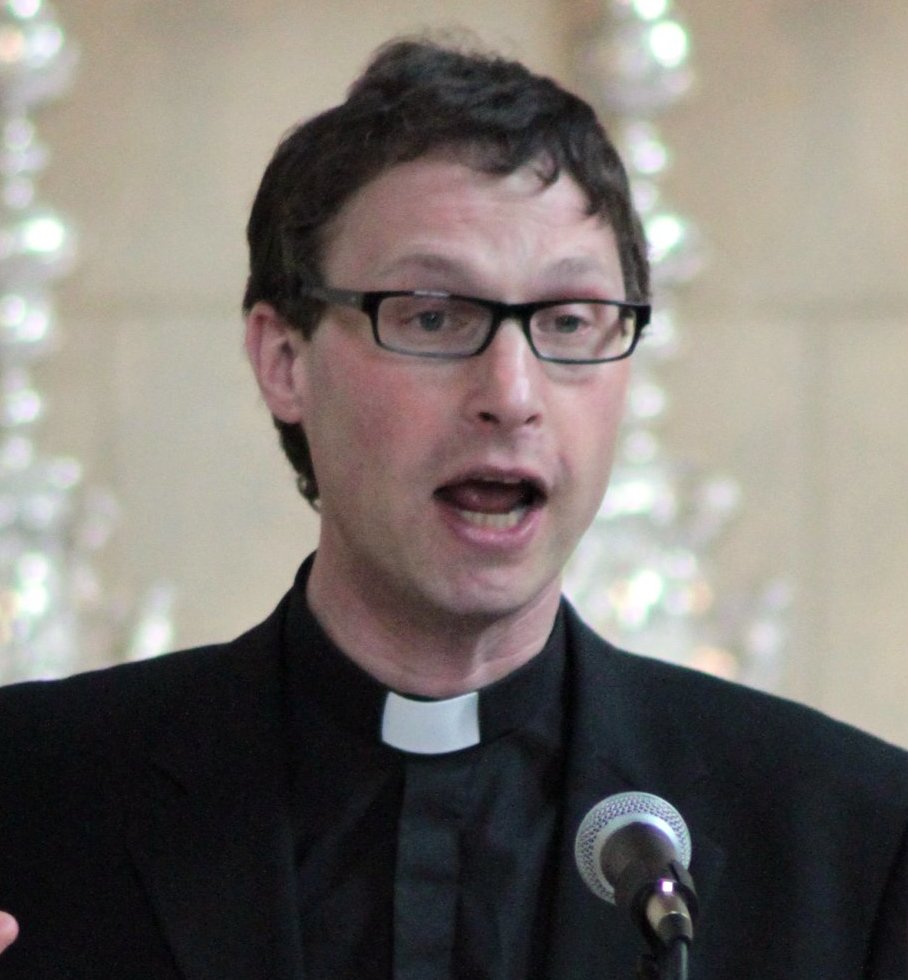
- Incumbent: Philip North

Location
- Ecclesiastical province: York
- Residence: Bishop's House, Salesbury

Information
- First holder: Percy Herbert
- Established: 1927
- Diocese: Blackburn
- Cathedral: Blackburn Cathedral

The Bishop of Blackburn is the Ordinary of the Church of England Diocese of Blackburn in the Province of York.

The diocese covers much of the county of Lancashire and has its see in the town of Blackburn, where the seat of the diocese is located at the Cathedral Church of Saint Mary. Although it has a cathedral, Blackburn is not a city.

The office has existed since the foundation of the see from part of the Diocese of Manchester in 1926 under George V. The current bishop is Philip North, since the confirmation on 25 April 2023 of his election. The bishop's residence is Bishop's House, Salesbury.

== List of bishops ==
Bishops of Blackburn
From	Until	Incumbent	Notes
1927	1942	Percy Herbert	Translated from Kingston-upon-Thames; nominated 18 December 1926 and confirmed 26 January 1927; translated to Norwich 22 July 1942.
1942	1954	Wilfred Askwith	Nominated 2 November and consecrated 30 November 1942; translated to Gloucester 7 July 1954.
1954	1960	Walter Baddeley	Translated from Whitby; nominated 10 September and confirmed 2 October 1954; died in office 11 February 1960.
1960	1971	Charles Claxton	Translated from Warrington; nominated 1 July and confirmed 18 July 1960; resigned 30 November 1971; died 7 March 1992.
1972	1981	Robert Martineau	Translated from Huntingdon; nominated 21 December 1971 and confirmed 24 January 1972; resigned 31 October 1981; died 28 June 1999.
1982	1989	Stewart Cross	Translated from Doncaster; nominated 26 January 1982 and confirmed 26 February 1982; died in office 27 December 1989.
1989	2003	Alan Chesters	Previously Archdeacon of Halifax since 1985; nominated and consecrated in 1989; resigned 31 March 2003.
2004	2012	Nicholas Reade	Previously Archdeacon of Lewes and Hastings since 1997; nominated 4 August 2003, consecrated at York Minster 2 March 2004 and installed at Blackburn Cathedral 27 March 2004; resigned 31 October 2012.
2013	2022	Julian Henderson	Retired 31 August 2022.
2023	present	Philip North	Acting since 1 September 2022; translated from Burnley on 25 April 2023.

== Assistant bishops ==
Among those who have served as assistant bishops in the diocese were:

- 1982 – 1999 (d.): Ken Giggall (former Bishop of St Helena and Auxiliary Bishop of Gibraltar) retired to Lytham
- 1992 – 2000 (ret.): Donald Nestor, Priest-in-Charge of Bretherton and former Suffragan Bishop of Lesotho
