= Nicholas Reade =

British Anglican bishop

The Right Reverend Nicholas Reade
- Bishop of Blackburn
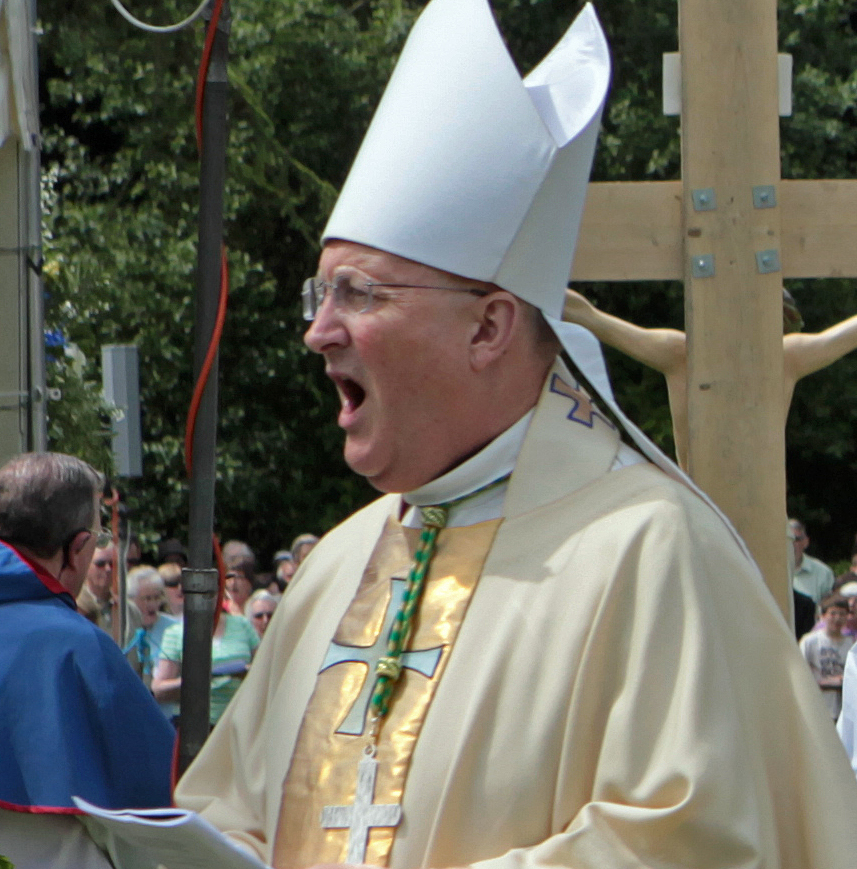
- Bishop Reade in 2014
- Church: Church of England
- Province: Province of York
- Diocese: Diocese of Blackburn
- Installed: 27 March 2004
- Term ended: 31 October 2012
- Predecessor: Alan Chesters
- Successor: Julian Henderson
- Other post: Archdeacon of Lewes & Hastings (1997–2004)

Orders
- Ordination: 1973 (deacon); 1974 (priest)
- Consecration: 2 March 2004 by David Hope

Personal details
- Born: 9 December 1946 (age 79)
- Denomination: Anglican
- Spouse: Christine
- Children: One
- Education: University of Leeds

Member of the House of Lords
- Lord Spiritual
- Bishop of Blackburn; 22 October 2009 – 31 October 2012

Nicholas Stewart Reade (born 9 December 1946) is a retired British Anglican bishop. He was the Bishop of Blackburn in the Province of York from 2004 to 2012.

== Early life and education ==
Reade was born on 9 December 1946. He was educated at Elizabeth College, Guernsey and the University of Leeds. He has completed a Bachelor of Arts (BA) degree and a diploma in theology (DipTH).

== Ordained ministry ==
He was ordained in 1973, after studying at the College of the Resurrection, Mirfield. He began his ordained ministry with a curacy at St Chad's Coseley. He was then appointed priest in charge of Holy Cross Bilbrook and then the vicar of St Peter's Upper Gornal.

From 1982 to 1988, he was vicar of the Church of St. Dunstan, Mayfield and Rural Dean of Dallington. From 1988 to 1997, he was Rural Dean of Eastbourne. He was Canon and Prebendary of Chichester Cathedral between 1990 and 1997. He became the Archdeacon of Lewes & Hastings in 1997.

=== Episcopal ministry ===
He was ordained to the episcopate on 2 March 2004, and installation as Bishop of Blackburn at Blackburn Cathedral on 27 March 2004. He had been announced as the new bishop in August 2003.

Reade ordained men and women as deacons, but did not ordain women as priests or bishops. He is a member of The Society, a traditionalist Anglo-Catholic society of the Church of England.

In February 2012, the diocese announced that Reade was to retire on 31 October 2012. In his retirement, he was licensed in mid-2013 as an honorary assistant bishop of the Diocese in Europe.

== Personal life ==
Reade is married to Christine, with one adult daughter.

== Styles ==
- Nicholas Reade Esq (1946–1973)
- The Revd Nicholas Reade (1973–1997)
- The Ven Nicholas Reade (1997–2004)
- The Rt Revd Nicholas Reade (2004–present)

Church of England titles
Preceded by Alan Chesters	Bishop of Blackburn; 2004–2012	Succeeded by Julian Henderson
