= Bishop of Doncaster =

Title used by a bishop of the Church of England

The Bishop of Doncaster is an episcopal title used by a suffragan bishop of the Church of England Diocese of Sheffield, in the Province of York, England. The title takes its name after the city of Doncaster in South Yorkshire; the See was erected under the Suffragans Nomination Act 1888 by Order in Council dated 4 February 1972. The current bishop is Leah Vasey-Saunders, since her consecration into bishop's orders on 16 September 2025.

== List of bishops ==
Bishops of Doncaster
From	Until	Incumbent	Notes
1972	1975	Hetley Price	(1922–1977). Translated to Ripon
1976	1982	Stewart Cross	(1928–1989). Translated to Blackburn
1982	1992	William Persson	(b. 1927)
1993	1999	Michael Gear	(1934–2018)
2000	2011	Cyril Ashton	(b. 1942)
2012	2019	Peter Burrows	(b. 1955) Retired 30 September 2019.
2020	2025	Sophie Jelley	Consecration originally scheduled for "spring 2020", but postponed; licensed ad interim as "Bishop of Doncaster designate and Principal Commissary of the Bishop of Sheffield", 25 March 2020; consecrated 21 September 2020. Translated to Coventry, 14 February 2025.
2025	present	Leah Vasey-Saunders	Nominated 23 June 2025; consecrated 16 September 2025.
