= Stewart Cross =

Former Bishop of Doncaster (1928–1989)

- Bishop of Blackburn
- Diocese: Diocese of Blackburn
- In office: 1982–1989 (d.)
- Predecessor: Robert Martineau
- Successor: Alan Chesters
- Other post: Bishop of Doncaster (1976–1982)

Orders
- Ordination: 1954 (deacon); 1955 (priest) by Noel Hudson (Newcastle)
- Consecration: 1976 by Stuart Blanch (York)

Personal details
- Born: 4 April 1928
- Died: 6 April 1989 (aged 61)
- Denomination: Anglican
- Education: Trinity College, Dublin

David Stewart Cross (4 April 1928 – 6 April 1989) was the second Bishop of Doncaster who was later translated to Blackburn.

Educated at Trinity College, Dublin, he was made deacon on Trinity Sunday 1954 (13 June) and ordained priest the following Trinity Sunday (5 June 1955) — both times by Noel Hudson, Bishop of Newcastle, at Newcastle Cathedral. His first post was as a curate at Hexham. From 1960 to 1963 he was Precentor of St Albans Cathedral then moved to Manchester to serve St Ambrose Church in Chorlton-on-Medlock.

From 1968 to 1976 he was a producer and broadcaster for BBC religious broadcasting at Manchester, which included a TV Songs of Praise from Blackburn Cathedral, whose diocese he would later serve as bishop. He had a wife, Mary, with whom he had a son and two daughters.

In 1976 he was ordained to the episcopate, first serving as suffragan Bishop of Doncaster. His consecration was on 2 July 1976 at York Minster, by Stuart Blanch, Archbishop of York. Then in 1982 he was appointed diocesan Bishop of Blackburn, serving until his death from cancer in 1989. He is today perhaps best known for his hymn "Father, Lord of all creation", published in several English-language hymnbooks.

== See also ==
Church of England titles
Preceded by Hetley Price	Bishop of Doncaster; 1976–1982	Succeeded by William Persson
Preceded by Robert Martineau	Bishop of Blackburn; 1982–1989	Succeeded by Alan Chesters
