= Lucia Nixon =

British archaeologist

Lucia Nixon is a Classical Archaeologist at the University of Oxford. She was Senior Tutor at St Hilda's College, Oxford. Since 1987, she has co-directed the Sphakia Survey with Jennifer Moody, which excavates and surveys the Sphakia region of south-west Crete, from ca. 3000 BCE - 1900 CE.

== Education ==
Nixon holds an AB in Ancient Greek and Classical Archaeology from Bryn Mawr College. She completed an MA in Classics from the University of British Columbia and an MA in Museum Studies from the University of Toronto. Nixon completed doctoral-level research in Classical Archaeology at Newnham College, University of Cambridge.

== Career ==
Nixon was Assistant Professor of Classics at the University of New Brunswick at St John Canada. ^{[xiii]} Since 1995, she has been a Member of the Common Room of Wolfson College, Oxford and the sub-Faculty of Ancient History and Classical Archaeology. She taught Classical Archaeology at Oxford before becoming the first full-time Senior Tutor at St Hilda's College, Oxford. She has completed extensive archaeological fieldwork in the UK, Turkey, Italy and Greece, and has published widely on sacred and economic landscape, and gender, equality, and education.

Nixon began excavating in Crete in 1976. As co-director of the Sphakia Survey, Nixon has led specialist archaeologists from Canada, the US and the UK investigating the interaction between people and the landscape between people and landscape over 5000 years.

== Bibliography ==
- 'Cretan Myths. A Broad Sweep of the Island's Long and Varied History', TLS, 30 October 2020
- 'Messages from Mykene: Othering and Smothering. Intersectional Orientalism and Sexism in a Museum Exhibition', Everyday Orientalism (2020)
- ‘The Early Ottoman Sacred Landscape of Khania’, in C. Morris, G. Papantoniou, A. Vionis (eds), Spatial Analysis of Ritual and Cult in the Mediterranean Studies in Mediterranean Archaeology (2019) 99-117
- 'All things to all people. Questions of colour in the reception of Nefertiti' TLS 2018, 3 August 2018
- ‘Cultural Landscapes and Resources in Sphakia, SW Crete: A Diachronic Perspective’, with Jennifer Moody, in David Rupp and Jonathan Tomlinson (eds), From Maple to Olive. Proceedings of a Colloquium to Celebrate the 40th Anniversary of the Canadian Institute in Greece, Athens 10–11 June 2016 (Athens: Publication of the Canadian Institute in Greece 2017) 485-504
- Making a Landscape Sacred: Outlying Churches and Icon Stands in Sphakia, Crete (Oxford: Oxbow, 2006)
- (with Simon Price) 'Ancient Greek Agricultural Terraces: Evidence from Texts and Archaeological Survey', American Journal of Archaeology Vol. 109, No. 4 (October 2005) 665–94
- 'Gender Bias in Archaeology', Women in Ancient Societies: An Illusion of the Night, ed. by Leonie J. Archer, Susan Fischler, Maria Wyke (London: Routledge, 1995)
- Nixon, Lucia, et al. "Archaeological Survey in Sphakia, Crete." Echos du monde classique: Classical views, vol. 33 no. 2, 1989, p. 201-215
