= Stuart Price (photographer) =

English photographer

For other people named Stuart Price, see Stuart Price (disambiguation).

Stuart Price (born 1971 in Yorkshire, England), is a professional photographer who currently resides in Brighton, England.

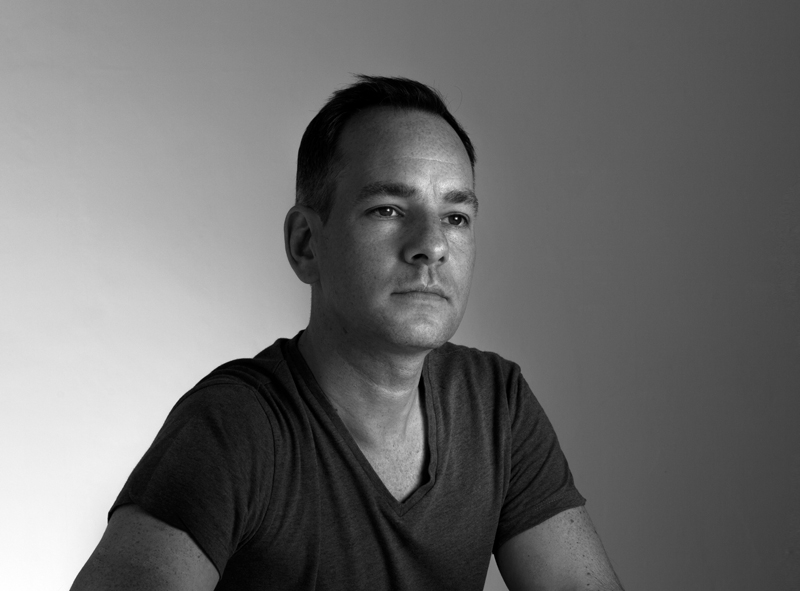
Stuart Price: Born / 1971 Yorkshire, England; Nationality / British; Occupation / Photographer; Website / stuartprice.co.uk

== Start of career ==
Brought up in a family of keen amateur photographers, it was Stuart's Father that taught him how to process film and photographs at the age of 13. His Grandfather was also a keen amateur photographer with a good eye for composition

Aged 18 he worked at Ilford Photographic gaining work experience where he printed images for the V&A museum in London under the guidance of Ilford's Head Printer Mike Walden.

After attending Mid-Cheshire College to study Photography he then went on to shoot images for local & national businesses as well as Photographic Magazines and was a regular contributor to Photo Answers Magazine.

== Work ==
On relocation to London, he assisted for a few years shooting cars, room sets, portraits and products.

In 2001 Shed Productions asked Stuart to shoot the cast of the TV series BAD GIRLS for the official book. He spent a week on set at Three Mills Studios in East London where he shot the cast including Linda Henry, Claire King & Debra Stephenson.

He has since shot Portraits, Fashion, Still Life for Companies such as LG, Coca-Cola & NEC

== Awards ==
In 1997, Stuart Price won his Category in the Image Bank / Campaign Magazine Awards The Award was made and presented to him by a young Thomas Heatherwick at The Mall Galleries in London

In 1998, Stuart Price won the Agfa / British Journal Of Photography Awards for a digital manipulated image

In 2011 he exhibited at the Association of Photographers Open Awards
