= Jack Nicholls =

British Anglican Bishop of Sheffield

The Right Reverend Jack Nicholls
- Bishop of Sheffield
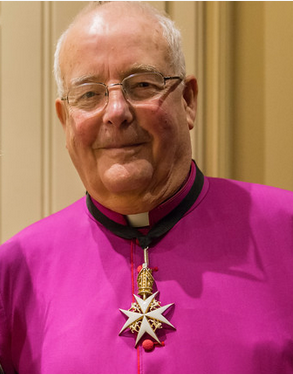
- Nicholls at his investiture as Prelate of the Venerable Order of St John in 2014
- Church: Church of England
- Diocese: Sheffield
- In office: 1997 – 16 July 2008
- Predecessor: David Lunn
- Successor: Steven Croft
- Other posts: Prelate of the Venerable Order of Saint John; 25 June 2007–present Bishop of Lancaster; 1990–1997

Orders
- Consecration: 25 April 1990 by John Habgood

Personal details
- Born: 16 July 1943 (age 83)
- Denomination: Anglican
- Parents: James William Nicholls; Nellie Nicholls
- Spouse: Judith Dagnall (m. 1969)
- Children: 4
- Education: King's College London

Member of the House of Lords
- Lord Spiritual
- Bishop of Sheffield; 4 March 2003 – 16 July 2008

John Nicholls (born 16 July 1943) is a British Anglican bishop who was formerly the Bishop of Sheffield.

== Early life and education ==
Nicholls was born on 16 July 1943, the son of James and Nellie Nicholls. He was educated at Bacup and Rawtenstall Grammar School. He then studied at King's College, London and its postgraduate facility at St Boniface College, Warminster.

== Ordained ministry ==
Nicholls was ordained in the Church of England as a deacon in 1967 and as a priest in 1968. He was curate of St Clement with St Cyprian, Salford from 1967 to 1969, curate of All Saints and Martyrs, Manchester from 1969 to 1972, and vicar there from 1972 to 1978. Between 1978 and 1983, he was director of pastoral studies at the College of the Resurrection, Mirfield and between 1983 and 1990 a residential canon of Manchester Cathedral.

In 1990, he became Bishop of Lancaster, a suffragan bishop in the Diocese of Blackburn. He was consecrated a bishop on 25 April 1990 by John Habgood, Archbishop of York. In 1997, he was appointed 6th Bishop of Sheffield. He was introduced in the House of Lords as a Lord Spiritual on 4 March 2003. He retired from full-time ministry on his 65th birthday, 16 July 2008.

Nicholls has been an honorary assistant bishop in the Diocese of Derby since 2008 and in the Diocese of Manchester since 2012. From 2007 to 2015, he was Prelate of the Venerable Order of St John. He is currently the chaplain of the Church Lads' and Church Girls' Brigade and episcopal visitor of the Oratory of the Good Shepherd. He was created Companion of the Roll of Honour of the Memorial of Merit of King Charles the Martyr in 2021.

=== Views ===
Nicholls had at first been strongly opposed to the ordination of women. However, he had changed his mind by the time of his appointment as Bishop of Lancaster and he subsequently ordained women to the priesthood for the Diocese of Blackburn.

== Personal life ==
Nicholls has been married to Judith Dagnall since 1969; they have two sons and two daughters.
