= Donald Nestor =

British suffragan bishop (1938-2003)

The Right Reverend Donald P. Nestor
- Assistant Bishop of Durham
- Church: Anglican
- Diocese: Diocese of Durham
- Previous posts: Assistant Bishop of Blackburn; Suffragan Bishop of Lesotho

Orders
- Ordination: 1965 (deacon); 1966 (priest)
- Consecration: 1979

Personal details
- Born: 6 October 1938 Calcutta, India
- Died: 10 January 2003 (aged 64) Durham, England

Donald Patrick Nestor (6 October 1938 – 10 January 2003) was a British suffragan bishop in Lesotho, a diocese in the Anglican Church of Southern Africa from 1979. In 1992 he returned to England to serve as an Assistant Bishop of Blackburn and later in the Diocese of Durham. Towards the end of his life he took vows as a member of the monastic Society of the Sacred Mission.

== Early life and education ==
Nestor was born in Calcutta, India on 6 October 1938. He did his high schooling at Heath Grammar School in Halifax, West Yorkshire and went from there to Exeter College, Oxford, where he studied theology. He completed his training for the priesthood at The Queen's College, Birmingham.

== Clerical work ==
In 1965 he was a curate at Woodkirk for three years, after which he spent four more years in that capacity at Forton, Hampshire.

In 1972 he went to Africa where he was chaplain at the universities of Botswana, Lesotho and Swaziland in the period between 1972 and 1979.

From 1974 onwards Nestor trained new priests in Lesotho, serving as Warden of Roma Anglican Seminary, Lesotho.

== Episcopal ministry ==
Nestor was elected as a suffragan bishop of Lesotho in 1979. He was well-loved in Lesotho, in part because of his gentle pastoral manner. Lesotho is a very mountainous country and many of the mission stations and settlements he served were accessible only on horseback, causing him to travel great distances in that manner. Nestor became fluent in Sesotho and offered encouragement and hope to his parishioners through his teaching. People of all races and faiths welcomed him wherever he went.

His work was completed in southern Africa in 1992 and he returned to England, where the Bishop of Blackburn invited him to become vicar of Bretherton and an Assistant Bishop of Blackburn. He served as the diocesan ecumenical officer, using his experience of working with African churches to good effect.

In 2001 Nestor joined the monastic Society of the Sacred Mission in Durham, where he also acted as an honorary assistant bishop in Durham diocese.

== Notes and references ==
- "The Rt Rev Donald Nestor". The Telegraph. 21 January 2003.
- Lapsley, Michael; Karakashian, Stephen (2012). Redeeming the Past: My Journey from Freedom Fighter to Healer. Orbis Books. p. 69. ISBN 978-1-60833-227-4.
- Hincks, Craig W. (2009). Quest for peace: an ecumenical history of the church in Lesotho. Christian Council of Lesotho. ISBN 9789991108018.
- Lastochkina, Maria (2003). Christian views of euthanasia: a comparison of Russian and western perspectives (Thesis). Durham University.
