= Simon Price (classicist) =

English classical scholar (1954–2011)

- Photographed in 1982
- Born: Simon Rowland Francis Price; 27 September 1954; London
- Died: 14 June 2011 (aged 56)
- Spouse: Lucia Nixon (m. 1985)
- Father: Hetley Price

Academic background
- Education: Manchester Grammar School; The Queen's College, Oxford; University College London
- Doctoral advisor: John North
- Influences: Fergus Millar

Academic work
- Discipline: Classical studies
- Sub-discipline: Ancient history
- Institutions: Christ's College, Cambridge; Lady Margaret Hall, Oxford

Simon Rowland Francis Price (27 September 1954 – 14 June 2011) was an English classical scholar, specialising in the imperial cult of ancient Rome. His father, Hetley Price, was a priest at Manchester Cathedral, and Simon was educated at the city's Manchester Grammar School. He subsequently read literae humaniores (classics) at The Queen's College, Oxford, undertook postgraduate study at Oxford and at University College London, then moved briefly to Christ's College, Cambridge before returning to Oxford for a position at Lady Margaret Hall, where he spent the entire remainder of his career.

Price's academic works included Rituals and Power: The Roman Imperial Cult in Asia Minor, which argued for a decentralised view of the imperial cult as variable between different cities and largely led by local aristocrats. His other academic work included studies in comparative literature, Greek agriculture, and early Christianity, as well as a collaboration with his wife, Lucia Nixon, in an archaeological survey of the Sfakia region of Crete. He took early retirement in 2008, following a diagnosis of cancer, and died in 2011.

== Life ==
Simon Rowland Francis Price was born in London on 27 September 1954, the son of the Anglican priest Hetley Price. He was educated at Manchester Grammar School: his father worked at Manchester Cathedral in the same city. He later credited his father's profession with giving him "an interest in the significance of established religion". He read literae humaniores (classics) at The Queen's College, Oxford, graduating in 1976 with a First. Among his undergraduate teachers was Fergus Millar. He subsequently registered for a DPhil at Oxford, then moved to University College London, where his thesis was supervised by John North.

Upon receiving his doctorate, Price moved to Christ's College, Cambridge, as a junior research fellow. He returned to Oxford in 1981, as fellow and tutor in ancient history at Lady Margaret Hall. In 1985, Price married the archaeologist Lucia Nixon, who co-directed with him the archaeological survey of the Sfakia region of south-western Crete: a two-volume publication of its results was forthcoming at the time of his death. The couple had two daughters. In 1992, Price took a sabbatical, as part of which he visited the University of New Brunswick and conducted research in Cambridge, Massachusetts, on the Harvard classicist and theologian Arthur Nock. His other academic work included articles on theories of dream interpretation, terracing in Greek agriculture, and apologetic literature in early Christianity. He also edited the Journal of Roman Studies and the magazine Omnibus, which publishes classical articles for sixth form students.

In his 1984 Rituals and Power: The Roman Imperial Cult in Asia Minor, Price argued that the Roman imperial cult in the Greek-speaking cities of Asia Minor was largely led by local citizens, and varied in its practices between cities in a manner which reflected the dialogue between local power structures and the central Roman authority. John North credited the book with "radically chang[ing] ideas about the worship of Roman emperors". In The New Republic, Glen Bowersock called it "the first interpretation that really makes sense of this whole bizarre phenomenon".

Price was diagnosed with a recurring gastrointestinal stromal tumour, a rare form of cancer, in 2007, and took early retirement from Oxford in 2008. He died on 14 June 2011. An obituary in The Times called Price "a pioneer in the study of religion in the classical world". The Telegraph called his Religions of the Ancient Greeks, published in 1999, "the best short book on Greek religion".

== Published works ==
=== As sole author ===
- Price, Simon (1984). Rituals and Power: The Roman Imperial Cult in Asia Minor. Cambridge University Press. ISBN 978-0-521-31268-4.
- — (1984). "Gods and Emperors: The Greek Language of the Roman Imperial Cult". Journal of Hellenic Studies. 104: 79–95. doi:10.2307/630281. JSTOR 630281.
- — (1987). "From Noble Funerals to Divine Cult: The Consecration of Roman Emperors". In Cannadine, David; Price, Simon (eds.). Rituals of Royalty: Power and Ceremonial in Traditional Societies. Cambridge University Press. pp. 56–105. ISBN 0-521-33513-2 – via Internet Archive.
- — (1999). Religions of the Ancient Greeks. Cambridge University Press. ISBN 978-0-521-38867-2.
- — (2010). "The Road to 'Conversion': The Life and Work of A. D. Nock". Harvard Studies in Classical Philology. 105: 317–339. JSTOR 41429152.
- — (2012). "Religious Mobility in the Roman Empire". Journal of Roman Studies. 102: 1–19. doi:10.1017/S0075435812000056. JSTOR 41724963. (Note: Posthumous publication and translation of a lecture delivered in French at the Collège de France on 5 November 2010.)

=== Collaborations ===
- Cannadine, David; Price, Simon, eds. (1987). Rituals of Royalty: Power and Ceremonial in Traditional Societies. Cambridge University Press. ISBN 0-521-33513-2 – via Internet Archive.
- Murray, Oswyn; Price, Simon, eds. (1990). The Greek City from Homer to Alexander. Oxford University Press. ISBN 0-19-814791-0.
- Nixon, Lucia; Price, Simon (1990). "The Size and Resources of Greek Cities". In Murray, Oswyn; Price, Simon (eds.). The Greek City from Homer to Alexander. Oxford University Press. pp. 137–170. ISBN 0-19-814791-0.
- Beard, Mary; North, John; Price, Simon (1998). Religions of Rome. Cambridge University Press. ISBN 978-1-316-13919-6.
- Price, Simon; Nixon, Lucia (2005). "Ancient Greek Agricultural Terraces: Evidence from Texts and Archaeological Survey". American Journal of Archaeology. 109 (4): 665–694. doi:10.3764/aja.109.4.665. JSTOR 40025693.
- North, John; Price, Simon, eds. (2011). The Religious History of the Roman Empire: Pagans, Jews and Christians. Oxford Readings in Classical Studies. Oxford University Press. ISBN 978-0-19-956735-5.
- Price, Simon; Thonemann, Peter (2011). The Birth of Classical Europe: A History from Troy to Augustine. London: Penguin. ISBN 978-1-101-47579-9.
