= Charles Claxton (bishop) =

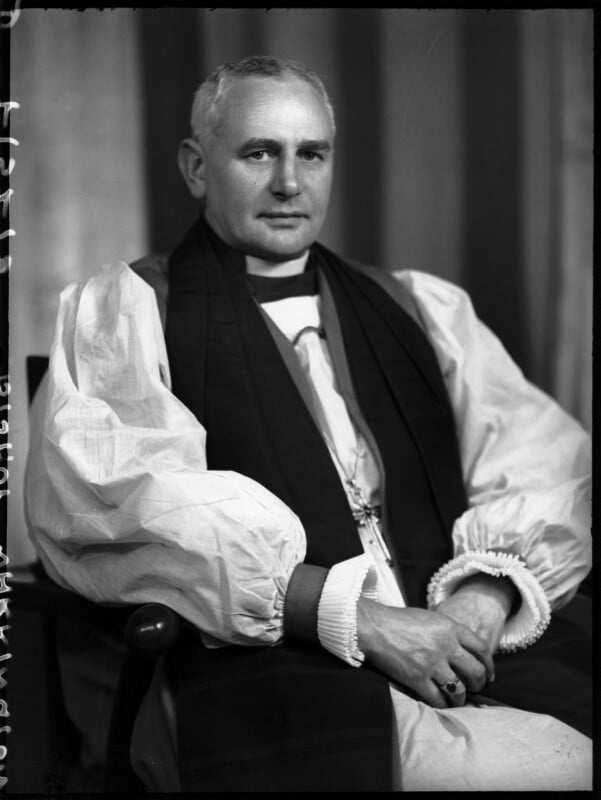
Claxton in 1950

Charles Robert Claxton (16 November 1903 – 7 March 1992) was the fourth Suffragan Bishop of Warrington later translated to the See of Blackburn.

== Life ==
He was the son of missionary Herbert Bailey Claxton and his wife Frances Anne Haslam, and was educated at Monkton Combe School and Queens' College, Cambridge. He was ordained in 1928 and began his ordained ministry with London curacies before becoming Vicar of Holy Trinity, Bristol in 1933. He was chaplain to the Bishop of Bristol before becoming the Suffragan Bishop of Warrington and then the diocesan Bishop of Blackburn.

During his long retirement he was an honorary assistant bishop in the Diocese of Exeter. He died in Cheshire.

Religious titles
Preceded by Herbert Gresford Jones	Bishop of Warrington; 1946–1960	Succeeded by Laurie Brown
Preceded by Walter Baddeley	Bishop of Blackburn; 1960–1971	Succeeded by Robert Martineau
