= Bishop of Sheffield =

Diocesan bishop in the Church of England

- Bishopric

anglican
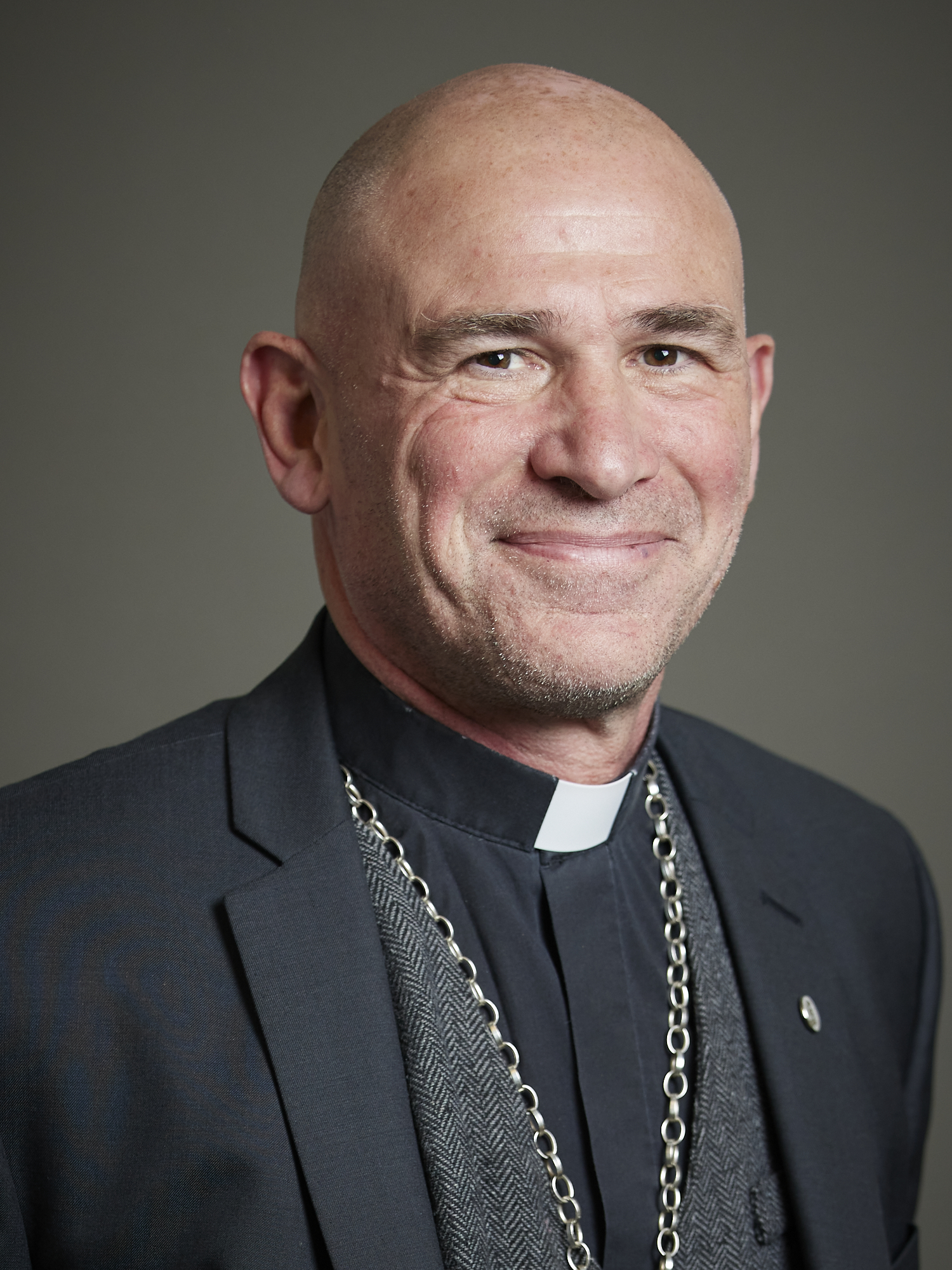
- Incumbent; Peter Wilcox

Location
- Ecclesiastical province: York
- Residence: Bishopscroft, Ranmoor

Information
- Established: 1914
- Diocese: Sheffield
- Cathedral: Sheffield Cathedral

The Bishop of Sheffield is the Ordinary of the Church of England Diocese of Sheffield in the Province of York. Since 2017 Peter Wilcox has been the incumbent.

== History ==
A similar title was first created as a suffragan see in the Diocese of York in 1901. John Quirk, the only Bishop suffragan of Sheffield assisted the Archbishop of York in overseeing that diocese. Under George V, the Diocese of Sheffield was created out of the south-western part of the Diocese of York in 1914. The bishop's residence is Bishopscroft, Ranmoor — west-south-west of the city centre.

On 31 January 2017, it was announced that Philip North had been nominated to translate to Sheffield before June 2017, but North withdrew his acceptance of the nomination in March officially citing "personal reasons". Since his nomination, there had been a number of public articles challenging the appropriateness of his appointment, based on his rejection of the ordination of priests who are women and the number of priests in Sheffield diocese who are women.

On 7 April 2017, it was announced that Peter Wilcox was to be consecrated Bishop of Sheffield on 22 June 2017. He was elected to the See by the college of canons of Sheffield Cathedral on 5 May 2017; and his election was confirmed on 5 June 2017 at York Minster.

== List of bishops ==
Bishops of Sheffield
From	Until	Incumbent	Notes
1914	1939	Leonard Burrows	Formerly Suffragan Bishop of Lewes.
1939	1962	Leslie Hunter	
1962	1971	John Taylor	Formerly Principal of Wycliffe Hall
1972	1979	Gordon Fallows	Formerly Suffragan Bishop of Pontefract. Died in office.
1980	1997	David Lunn	
1997	2008	Jack Nicholls	Formerly Suffragan Bishop of Lancaster.
2008	6 July 2016	Steven Croft	Elected November 2008; consecrated January 2009; translated to Oxford.
2016	5 June 2017	Peter Burrows, Bishop of Doncaster	
January 2017	March 2017	Philip North, bishop-nominate	Withdrew
5 June 2017	present	Pete Wilcox	Formerly Dean of Liverpool. Elected 5 May, confirmed on 5 June, and consecrated 22 June 2017.

== Assistant bishops ==
Among those who have served the diocese as assistant bishops have been:

- 1947–1971: Vincent Gerard, Vicar of Rotherham (until 1960), then Canon Residentiary of Sheffield Cathedral (until 1969) and former Bishop of Waiapu
- 1963 – 1966 (ret.): Michael Hollis, Rector of Todwick (until 1964) and former Bishop in Madras
- 1943 (ret.) – 1947 (d.): Samuel Heaslett, retired Bishop of South Tokyo and Presiding Bishop, Nippon Sei Ko Kai

== See also ==
- Bishop of Hallam
