= Bishopscroft, Ranmoor =

Clergy house in Sheffield, England

Coordinates: 53°22′29″N 1°31′57″W

Bishopscroft is a Clergy house in Ranmoor, in Sheffield, England. The home is the residence of the Bishop of Sheffield. The bishop holds various events at the building, including a garden party in June 2026.

== History ==
The building was built by Sydney L. Chipling in 1913 and was originally named The Côte.
