= St James, Norton =

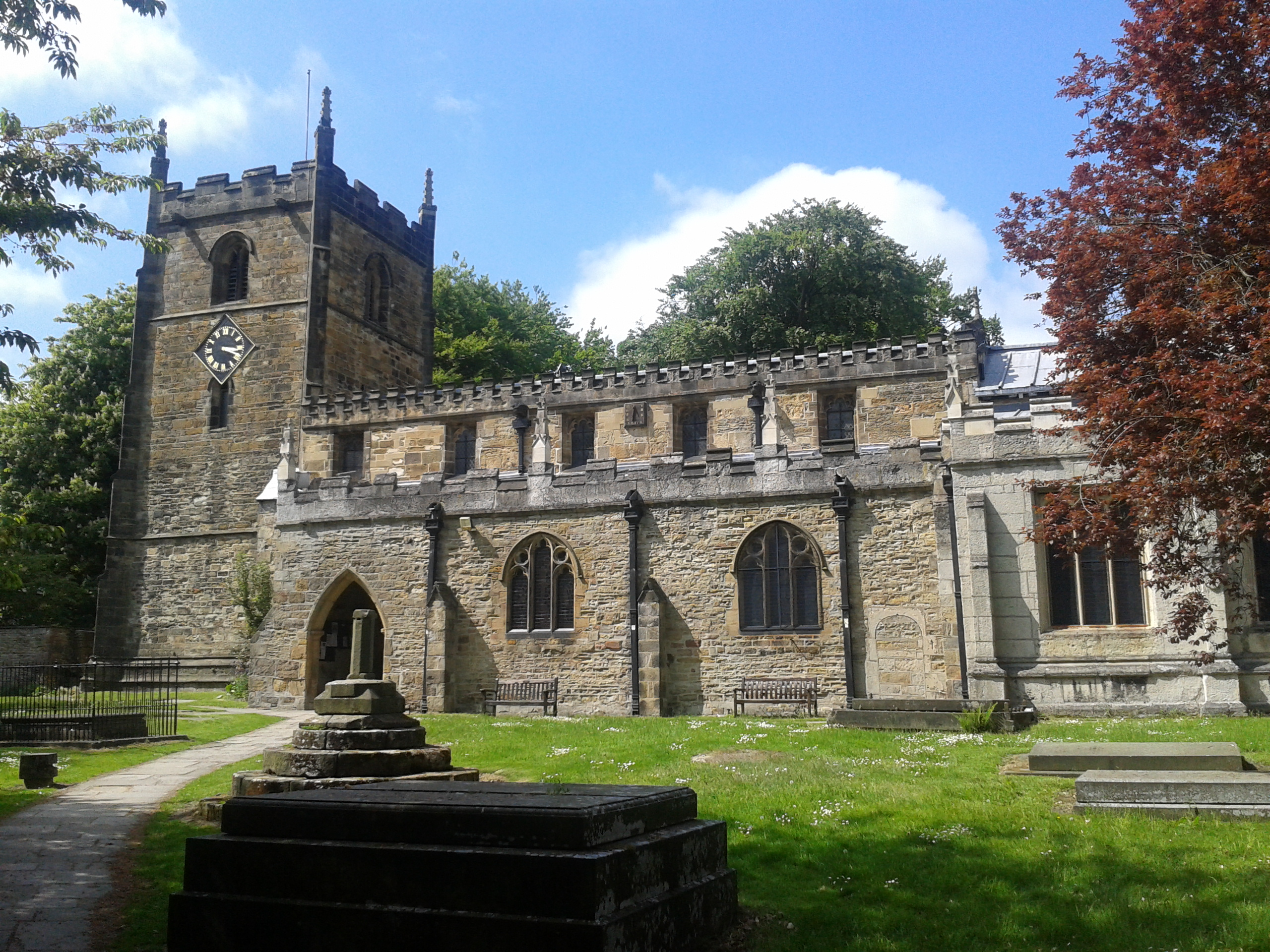

- 53.3355°N 1.4615°W
- OS grid reference: SK 35879 82166
- Location: Norton, Sheffield
- Country: England
- Denomination: Church of England
- Website: St James Church, Norton

History
- Dedication: St James the Greater
- Consecrated: 11th century

Architecture
- Functional status: active
- Heritage designation: Grade II*
- Designated: 1 May 1952
- Architectural type: Church
- Style: Norman, Early English, Perpendicular

Specifications
- Materials: Stone

Administration
- Province: York
- Diocese: Sheffield
- Deanery: Ecclesall

Clergy
- Priest: Revd Ben Shires (Priest-in-Charge)

St James, Norton is the Church of England parish church of the Norton district of Sheffield, South Yorkshire, England.

== History ==
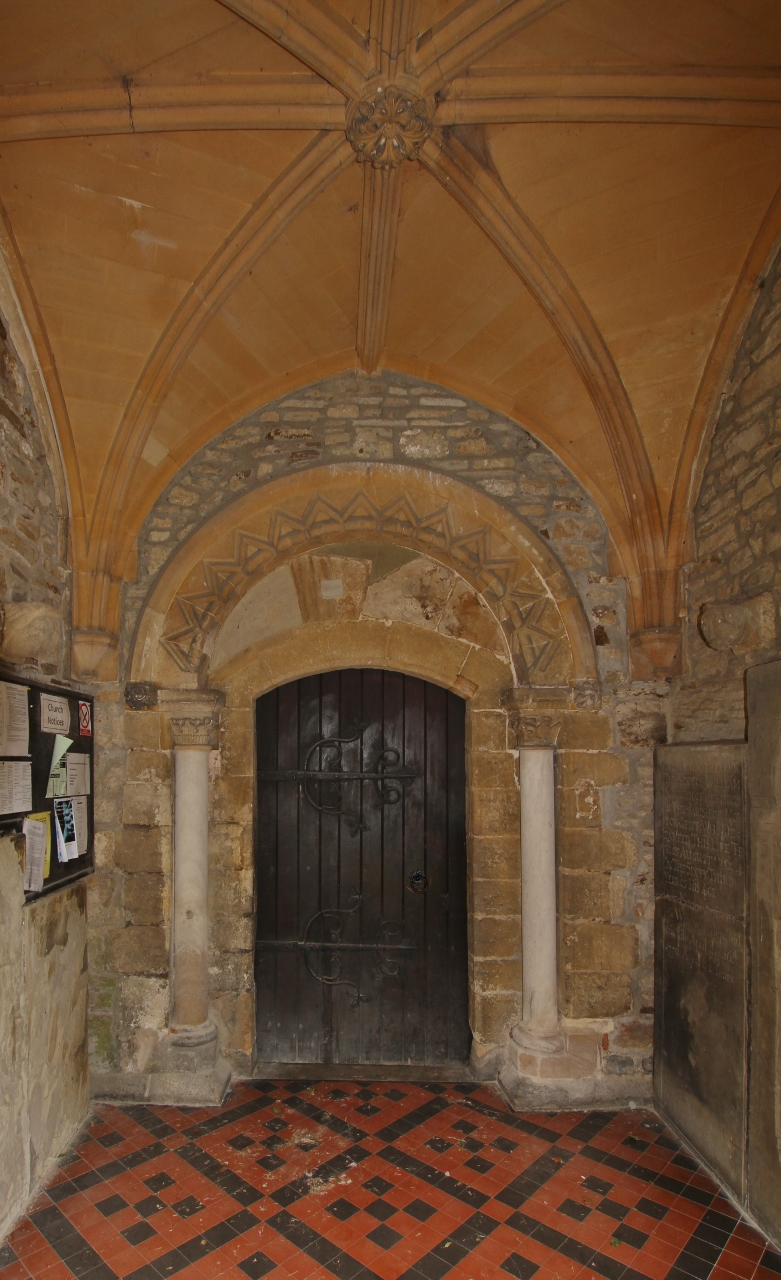
Restored Norman doorway inside the south porch

The Domesday Book of 1086 records a manor at Norton but not a church. The earliest parts of the building are Norman: the 11th-century inner doorway in the south porch and six corbels, evidently re-set, flanking it on the east and west walls of the porch. The arch over the doorway has zigzag moulding but is heavily restored. If the doorway is 11th-century, the claim by John Charles Cox (1843–1919) that Robert FitzRanulph (circa 1117–72) founded the church can be discounted.

The church has a west tower, all but the top of which is Early English Gothic. Also Early English is the baptismal font inside the church.

Much of the rest of the church is Perpendicular Gothic. The nave has north and south aisles. The north aisle has five bays and was built about 1200. The south aisle has a three-bay arcade and is 14th-century. East of the south aisle is a south chapel with its own two-bay arcade, which was completed in 1524.

In the 19th century the church was restored, the vestry and organ chamber were built and the south porch was rebuilt with a new Gothic Revival vault.

The west tower has a ring of eight bells. John Taylor & Co of Loughborough, Leicestershire cast or re-cast them all in 1896, in time for the Diamond Jubilee of HM Queen Victoria in 1897.

== Churchyard ==
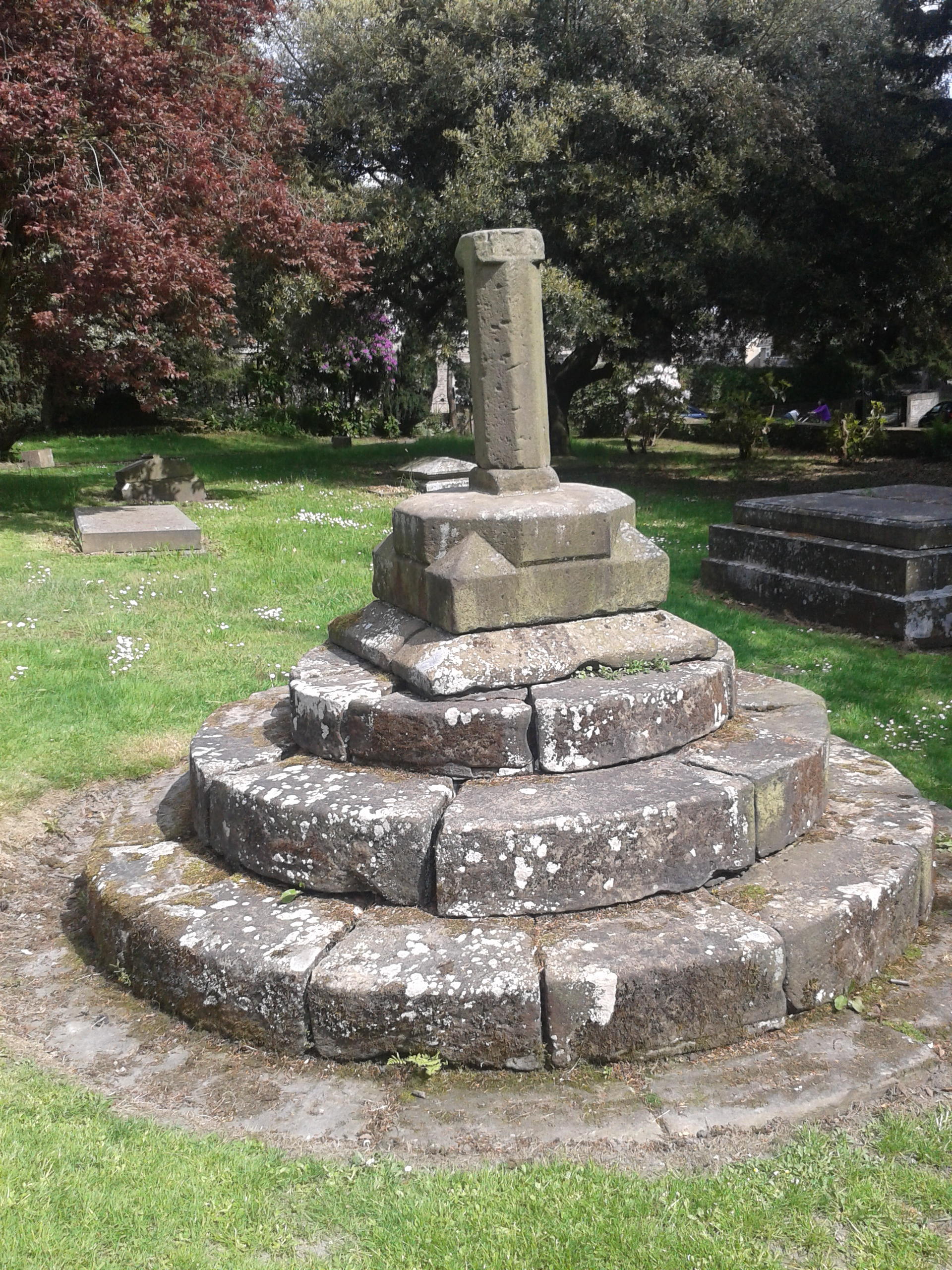
Remains of 14th-century stone cross

In the churchyard are the base and truncated shaft of a 14th-century stone cross. Its gritstone base, with four steps, and plinth are thought to be original, while its socket stone and shaft are believed to be 18th- or 19th-century replacements. The cross is a Scheduled Ancient Monument and is Grade II listed.

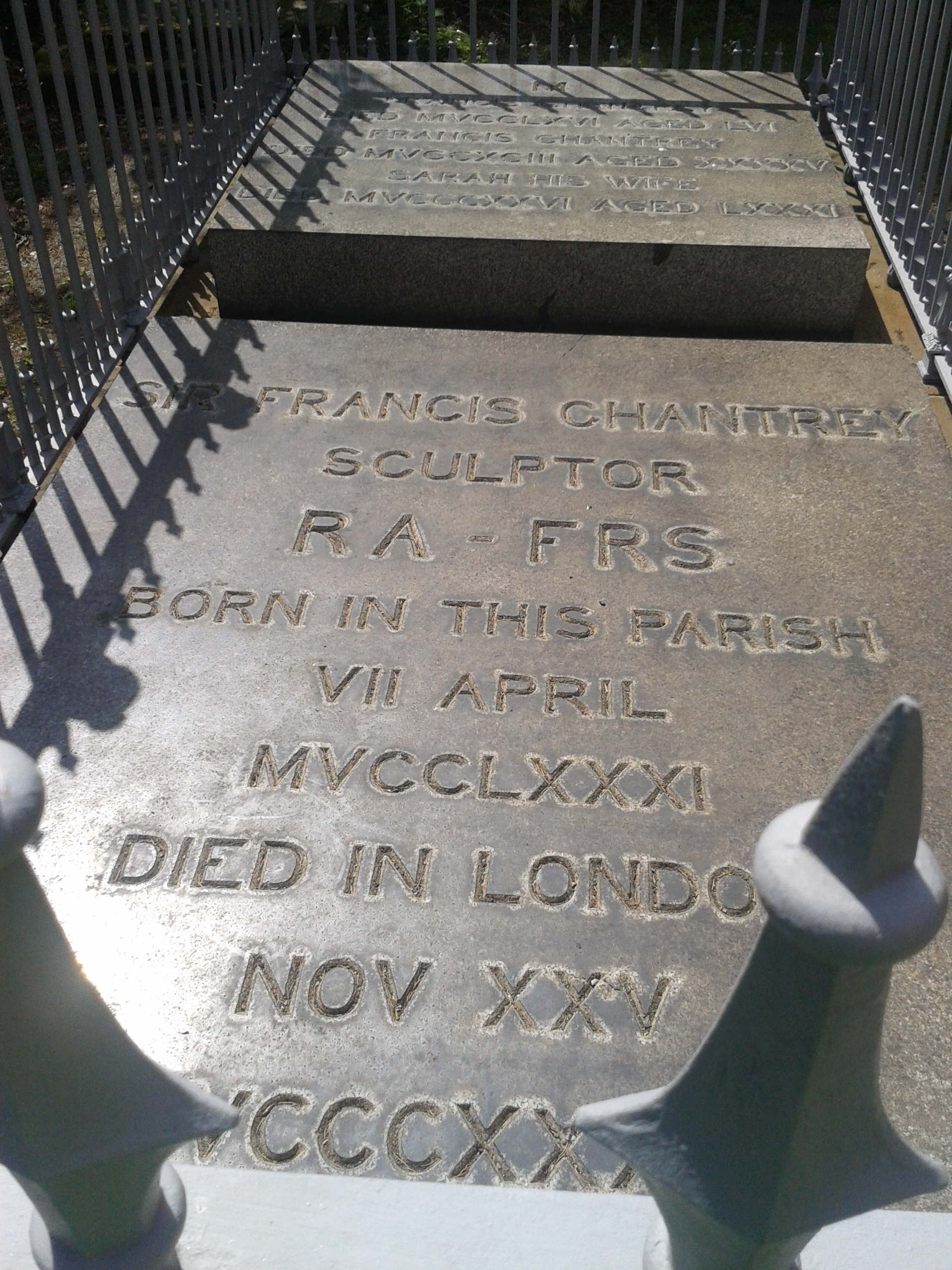
Chantrey tomb

In the churchyard is the Chantrey tomb, designed by the sculptor Francis Leggatt Chantrey (1781–1841) and completed on his death in 1841. He is among the family members buried in it. The tomb is also Grade II listed.

== Bibliography ==
- Cox, John Charles (1875). Notes on the Churches of Derbyshire. Vol. I, the Hundred of Scarsdale. Chesterfield: Palmer and Edmunds. p. 291.
- Pevsner, Nikolaus; Radcliffe, Enid (revision) (1967) [1959]. Yorkshire: The West Riding: Sheffield and the South. The Buildings of England. Harmondsworth: Penguin Books. p. 479. ISBN 0-14-071017-5.
