= Steven Croft (bishop) =

Anglican bishop of Oxford and Lord Spiritual (born 1957)

The Right Reverend Dr Steven Croft
- Bishop of Oxford
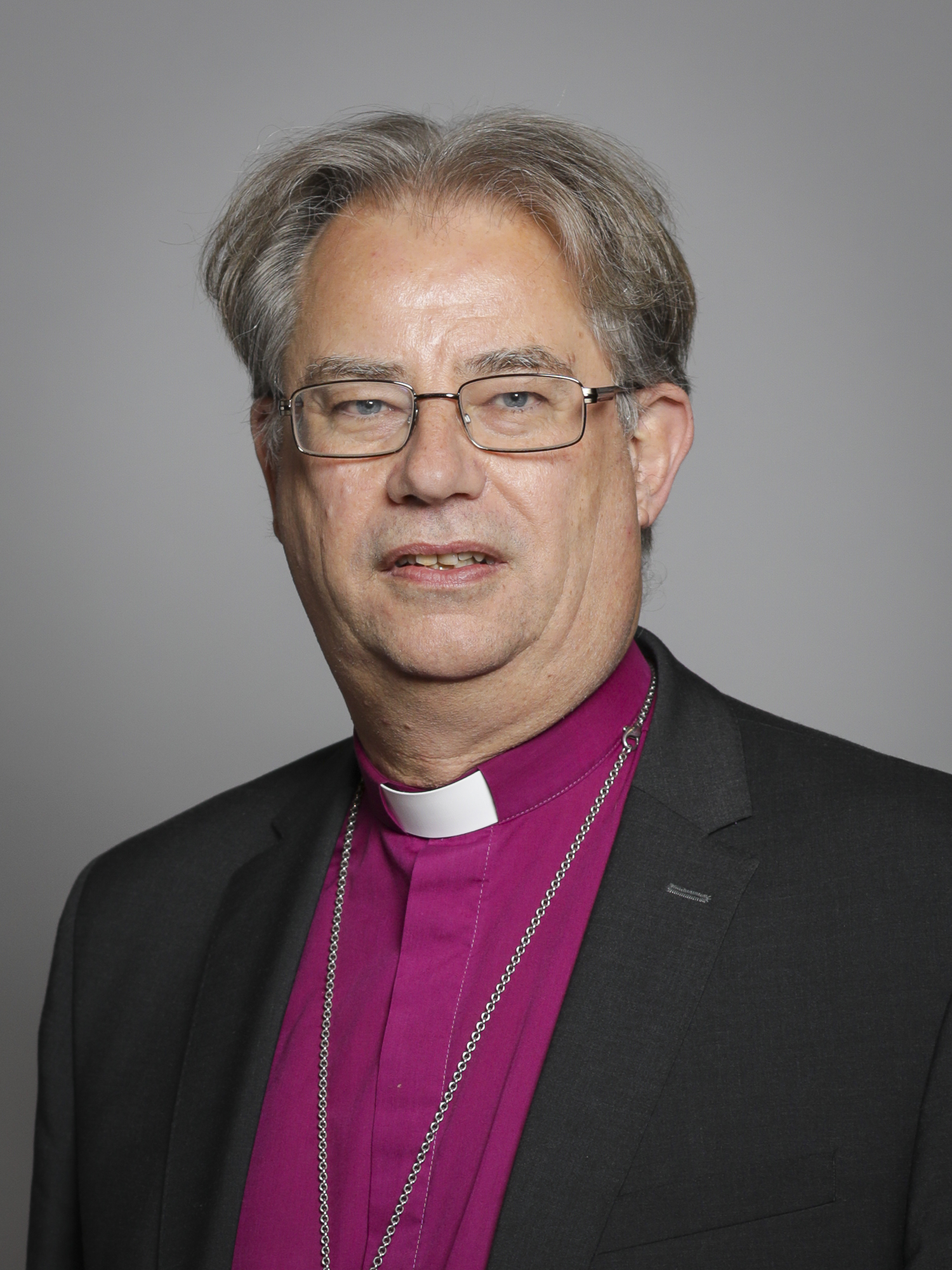
- Croft in 2019
- Church: Church of England
- Diocese: Diocese of Oxford
- In office: 6 July 2016 – 31 July 2026
- Predecessor: John Pritchard
- Other posts: Warden, Cranmer Hall (1996–2004); Archbishops' Missioner and Fresh Expressions Team Leader (2004–2008); Bishop of Sheffield (2008–2016)

Orders
- Ordination: 25 September 1983 (deacon) by Bill Westwood; 23 September 1984 (priest) by Graham Leonard
- Consecration: 25 January 2009 by John Sentamu

Personal details
- Born: 29 May 1957 (age 69) Halifax, West Riding of Yorkshire, England
- Denomination: Anglican
- Residence: Bishop's Lodge, Kidlington
- Spouse: Ann (m. 1978)
- Children: 4
- Education: Worcester College, Oxford; Cranmer Hall, Durham

Member of the House of Lords
- Lord Spiritual
- Bishop of Oxford; 19 July 2016 – 31 July 2026
- Bishop of Sheffield; 14 October 2013 – 19 July 2016

Steven John Lindsey Croft (born 29 May 1957) is a British retired bishop in the Church of England and a theologian specialising in mission. He was Bishop of Oxford from the confirmation of his election on 6 July 2016 to his retirement in 2026. He was the Bishop of Sheffield from 2008 to 2016; previously he was Archbishops' Missioner and Team Leader of Fresh Expressions, a joint Church of England and Methodist initiative. He falls within the open evangelical tradition of Anglicanism.

== Early life and education ==
Croft was born on 29 May 1957. He attended Heath Grammar School in Halifax and studied classics and theology at Worcester College, Oxford, graduating in 1980. From 1980 to 1983, he trained for ordination at Cranmer Hall, Durham. Durham University awarded him a Doctor of Philosophy (PhD) degree in 1984 for a thesis titled "The identity of the individual in the Book of Psalms".

== Ordained ministry ==
Croft was ordained as deacon in the Diocese of London on 25 September 1983 by Bill Westwood, Bishop of Edmonton, at St Andrew's Enfield (his title church). The following year, he was ordained as priest by Graham Leonard, Bishop of London, at St Paul's Cathedral on 23 September 1984. From 1983 to 1987 he was curate of the parish church of St Andrew's Enfield. After that, he became vicar of Ovenden, an Urban Priority Area parish in the Diocese of Wakefield, from 1987 to 1996. In 1997, Croft was made a member of the Church of England Evangelical Council, which he was a part of until 2000.

1996–2004: Warden (i.e. head) of Cranmer Hall

2004–2008: Archbishops' Missioner and first Team Leader of Fresh Expressions

Croft was appointed by the archbishops of Canterbury and York to help found Fresh Expressions, a joint Church of England and Methodist initiative "to help Christians of any denomination think about ways of starting and growing fresh expressions of church in their area" where a fresh expression is defined as "a form of church for our changing culture, established primarily for the benefit of people who are not yet members of any church". In recognition of this work he was awarded the silver Cross of St Augustine by the Archbishop of Canterbury.

=== Episcopal ministry ===
Croft was nominated as the next bishop of Sheffield, succeeding Jack Nicholls who retired in July 2008, and formally elected by the chapter of Sheffield Cathedral in November 2008 (and that election having been confirmed in the interim), he was consecrated as a bishop by John Sentamu, Archbishop of York, on 25 January 2009, at York Minster; and started in the diocese following his formal enthronement on 9 May 2009. This was followed by three welcome Eucharists celebrated in various locations around the diocese to allow more people to meet the new bishop.

In 2012, Croft was nominated by Rowan Williams, Archbishop of Canterbury, to be the Anglican fraternal delegate to the Synod of Bishops in Rome.

Croft became a member of the House of Lords on 15 July 2013. On 12 April 2016, it was announced that he was to be translated to become Bishop of Oxford in "autumn" 2016; he was duly elected to that see and that election was confirmed at Lambeth Palace on 6 July 2016, at which point Croft legally became Bishop of Oxford. He was reintroduced to the Upper House as Bishop of Oxford on 19 July 2016. Croft is the first bishop of Oxford to reside at the new Bishop's Lodge, Kidlington; "for decades" previously, bishops had resided at Linton Road in North Oxford.

=== Views ===
In November 2022, he became the most senior Church of England figure to back same-sex marriage, saying clergy should be free to bless or marry same-sex partners and to enter into a same-sex marriage themselves, in contrast to the church's official position. As a result of this, some evangelicals within his diocese may seek alternative oversight.

In November 2023, he was one of 44 Church of England bishops who signed an open letter supporting the use of the Prayers of Love and Faith (i.e. blessings for same-sex couples) and called for "Guidance being issued without delay that includes the removal of all restrictions on clergy entering same-sex civil marriages, and on bishops ordaining and licensing such clergy".

== Personal life ==
Croft was born in Halifax, West Riding of Yorkshire, in 1957. He is married to Ann and has four adult children – Paul (married to Bebe), Andy (married to Beth), Amy (married to Simon) and Sarah – and eight grandchildren.

== Protest at his enthronement ==
Two survivors of clerical child sexual abuse staged a peaceful protest outside Croft's inauguration as Bishop of Oxford on 30 September 2016. One of them said that he had told Croft three times in 2012 and 2013, when Croft was Bishop of Sheffield, of his rape by a serving priest, but the bishop and other senior figures had failed to respond or take action despite the abuser still being alive. The cover of the protest brochure handed out to the public pictured all six bishops who the survivor alleged had failed to respond, including John Sentamu, Archbishop of York. The survivor commented to the Church Times that he was angry that the church had the "nerve" to enthrone bishops after safeguarding complaints had been made against them. He went on to say

This is absolute proof that the Church of England does not truly recognise the profound and long-lasting impact such abuse has on survivors at all.

The protest was shown on ITV and the BBC. Croft met with one of the survivors in front of the news cameras.

== Police investigation ==
In 2018 it was reported in the media that Croft was being investigated by South Yorkshire Police, alongside Archbishop Sentamu, Bishop Martyn Snow and Bishop Peter Burrows, for failure to respond properly to a report of clerical child abuse. The priest against whom the allegation was made committed suicide the day before he was due in court in June 2017. The archbishop of York's office said:

The diocese of York insists that Sentamu did not fail to act on any disclosures because that responsibility lay with Ineson's local bishop, Steven Croft, who was at the time bishop of Sheffield.

A Guardian editorial contrasted Sentamu's response to a statement from Archbishop Justin Welby at the Independent Inquiry into Child Sexual Abuse, in which Welby stated

It is not an acceptable human response, let alone a leadership response to say "I have heard about a problem, but … it was someone else's job to report it."

Matt Ineson, the victim of the alleged abuse, called for the resignations of Sentamu and Croft. In May 2018, Archbishop Welby declined to discipline Croft, and said he "will take no further action" other than ensuring that Croft received further safeguarding training and understood his responsibilities as a diocesan bishop.

== Styles ==
- The Reverend Steven Croft (1983–1984)
- The Reverend Doctor Steven Croft (1984–2009)
- The Right Reverend Doctor Steven Croft (2009–present)

== Works ==
- The Identity of the Individual in the Psalms, Sheffield Academic Press, 1987 ISBN 978-1-85075-021-5
- Growing New Christians, CPAS/Marshall Pickering, 1993 ISBN 978-0-551-02701-5
- Making New Disciples, Marshall Pickering, 1994 ISBN 978-0-551-02862-3
- Emmaus: the Way of Faith (with Stephen Cottrell, John Finney, Felicity Lawson and Robert Warren), NS/CHP, six volumes, 1996; two volumes, 1998; second edition 200–2003.
- Man to Man: Friendship and Faith, Scripture Union, 1999 ISBN 978-1-85999-308-8
- Ministry in Three Dimensions: Ordination and Leadership in the Local Church, DLT, 1999, second edition, 2008 ISBN 978-0-232-52743-8
- Travelling Well: A companion guide to the Christian faith (with Stephen Cottrell), NS/CHP, 2000. ISBN 978-0-7151-4935-5
- The Lord is Risen: Luke 24, Emmaus Bible Resources 1, NS/CHP, 2002 ISBN 978-0-7151-4971-3
- Missionary Journeys, Missionary Church: Acts 13-20, Emmaus Bible Resources 2, NS/CHP 2002 ISBN 978-0-7151-4972-0
- Transforming Communities: Re-Imagining the Church for the 21st Century, DLT, 2002 ISBN 978-0-232-52456-7
- A Theology of Christian Leadership in Focus on Leadership, Foundation for Church Leadership, 2005.
- Learning for Ministry (with Roger Walton), CHP, 2005 ISBN 978-0-7151-4053-6
- Evangelism in a Spiritual Age (with Rob Frost, Mark Ireland, Anne Richards, Yvonne Richmond and Nick Spencer), CHP, 2005 ISBN 978-0-7151-4054-3
- Moving on in a Mission Shaped Church (booklet with George Lings), CHP, 2005 ISBN 978-0-7151-4078-9
- Starting a Fresh Expression (booklet with George Lings and Claire Dalpra), CHP 2006 ISBN 978-0-7151-4096-3
- Listening for Mission (booklet with Bob Hopkins and Freddy Hedley) CHP, 2006 ISBN 978-0-7151-4099-4
- Bishops’ Mission Orders: a beginners’ guide (booklet with Paul Bayes) CHP, 2008 ISBN 978-0-7151-4169-4
- Encouraging fresh expressions (booklet), Fresh Expressions, 2008 ISBN 978-0-9560005-1-4
- The Future of the Parish System: shaping the Church of England for the 21st Century (editor and contributor), CHP, 2006 ISBN 978-0-7151-4034-5
- The Advent Calendar (a novel for adults and children), DLT, 2006 ISBN 978-0-232-52680-6
- Mission-shaped Questions: defining issues for today's church, (editor and contributor), CHP, 2008 ISBN 978-0-7151-4153-3
- Reflections for Daily Prayer: Advent to 2 before Lent(section on Ecclesiastes), CHP, 2008 ISBN 978-0-7151-4160-1
- Jesus' People - What the church should do next, CHP, 2009 ISBN 978-0-7151-4187-8
