= Hetley Price =

English bishop (1922–1977)

Stuart Hetley Price (14 June 1922 – 15 March 1977) was the inaugural Bishop of Doncaster who was later translated to Ripon.

Price was educated at Loughborough Grammar School from 1931 to 1940. He entered Corpus Christi College, Cambridge, taking a B.A. in history in 1943, and then read for Part I theology in 1944. He was ordained in 1945. His first post was as Curate at St Michael and All Angels, Bournemouth, after which he was Domestic Chaplain to the Bishop of Manchester. He was then successively Secretary to the SCM; Rector of Didsbury; a Canon Residentiary at Manchester Cathedral and, his final post before elevation to the episcopate, Archdeacon of Manchester. He died, following complications brought on by a stroke, in March 1977. His son Simon Price (1954–2011) became a historian of ancient Roman religion.

Church of England titles
Preceded by Inaugural appointment	Bishop of Doncaster; 1972–1975	Succeeded by David Stewart Cross
Preceded by John Richard Humpidge Moorman	Bishop of Ripon; 1976–1977	Succeeded by David Nigel de Lorentz Young
