= Diocese of Sheffield =

Diocese of the Church of England

Coordinates: 53.382°N 1.470°W

Diocese of Sheffield Dioecesis Sheffieldensis
- Coat of arms

- Flag

Location
- Country: England
- Ecclesiastical province: York
- Archdeaconries: Sheffield and Rotherham, Doncaster

Statistics
- Parishes: 175
- Churches: 221

Information
- Denomination: Church of England
- Established: 23 January 1914
- Cathedral: Sheffield Cathedral
- Language: English

Current leadership
- Bishop: Peter Wilcox, Bishop of Sheffield
- Suffragan: Leah Vasey-Saunders, Bishop of Doncaster
- Archdeacons: Javaid Iqbal, Archdeacon of Doncaster; David Gerrard, Archdeacon-designate of Sheffield and Rotherham

Website
- sheffield.anglican.org

The Diocese of Sheffield is an administrative division of the Church of England, part of the Province of York.

The Diocese of Sheffield was created under George V on 23 January 1914, by the division from the Diocese of York (along with that part of the Diocese of Southwell in the city of Sheffield). It covers most of the County of South Yorkshire (except Barnsley), with a small part of the East Riding of Yorkshire, one parish in North Yorkshire and one in North Lincolnshire – an area of almost 576 square miles (1,490 km^{2}). It is headed by the Bishop of Sheffield and its Cathedral is Sheffield Cathedral.

The diocese has been linked with the Diocese of Argentina of the Anglican Church of South America since 1993 and the Hattingen-Witten District in Westphalia of the Protestant Church in Germany since 1990.

== Organisation ==
=== Bishops ===
The diocesan Bishop of Sheffield (Pete Wilcox) is the ordinary of the diocese and is assisted throughout the diocese by a Bishop suffragan of Doncaster (Leah Vasey-Saunders). Alternative episcopal oversight (for parishes in the diocese who reject the ministry of priests who are women) is provided by the provincial episcopal visitor (PEV) the Bishop suffragan of Beverley, Stephen Race. He is licensed as an honorary assistant bishop of the diocese in order to facilitate his work there. Besides Beverley, David Hawtin, former Bishop suffragan of Repton has lived in Greenhill since 2007 and is licensed as an honorary assistant bishop.

=== Archdeaconries and deaneries ===
The Diocese is subdivided into twelve deaneries, split between two archdeaconries:

Diocese	Archdeaconries	Rural Deaneries	Paid clergy	Churches	Population	People/clergy	People/church	Churches/clergy
Diocese of Sheffield	Archdeaconry of Doncaster	Deanery of Adwick-le-Street	7	14	66,972	9,567	4,784	2
Diocese of Sheffield	Archdeaconry of Doncaster	Deanery of Doncaster	12	13	90,629	7,552	6,971	1.08
Diocese of Sheffield	Archdeaconry of Doncaster	Deanery of Snaith & Hatfield	7	21	75,258	10,751	3,584	3
Diocese of Sheffield	Archdeaconry of Doncaster	Deanery of Tankersley	4	15	47,946	11,987	3,196	3.75
Diocese of Sheffield	Archdeaconry of Doncaster	Deanery of Wath	11	24	116,176	10,561	4,841	2.18
Diocese of Sheffield	Archdeaconry of Doncaster	Deanery of West Doncaster	9	15	77,363	8,596	5,158	1.67
Diocese of Sheffield	Archdeaconry of Sheffield & Rotherham	Deanery of Attercliffe	10	19	161,012	16,101	8,474	1.9
Diocese of Sheffield	Archdeaconry of Sheffield & Rotherham	Deanery of Ecclesall	20*	17*	130,870*	6,544	7,698	0.85
Diocese of Sheffield	Archdeaconry of Sheffield & Rotherham	Deanery of Ecclesfield	11	18	140,784	12,799	7,821	1.64
Diocese of Sheffield	Archdeaconry of Sheffield & Rotherham	Deanery of Hallam	24	16	115,966	4,832	7,248	0.67
Diocese of Sheffield	Archdeaconry of Sheffield & Rotherham	Deanery of Laughton	8	15	71,991	8,999	4,799	1.88
Diocese of Sheffield	Archdeaconry of Sheffield & Rotherham	Deanery of Rotherham	11	24	155,277	14,116	6,470	2.18
Total/average			134	211	1,250,244	9,330	5,925	1.57

*including Cathedral

== List of churches ==
=== Outside deanery structures ===
Benefice	Churches	Link	Clergy	Population served	Ref
Cathedra	Cathedral of SS Peter & Paul, Sheffield		Dean: Abigail Thompson; Canon & Vice-Dean: Keith Farrow; Canon Precentor: Geoffrey Harbord; Minor Canon: Ian Maher; Minor Canon: Mike Reeder; Hon Cathedral Evangelist: Michael Collyer	5,179	

=== Deanery of Adwick-le-Street ===
Benefice	Churches	Link	Clergy	Population served	Ref
Adwick-Le-Street (St Laurence) with Skelbrooke	St Laurence, Adwick-le-Street; St Michael & All Angels, Skelbrooke		Rector/Priest-in-Charge: Ann Walton; NSM (Adwick): Jacqueline Gardner	13,203	
Owston (All Saints)	All Saints, Owston; St Michael & All Angels, Skellow		Rector/Priest-in-Charge: Ann Walton; NSM (Adwick): Jacqueline Gardner	13,203	
Askern (St Peter)	St Peter, Askern		Vicar: David Franklin	5,558	
Bentley (St Peter)	St Peter, Bentley		Vicar: Dave Berry	7,107	
Bentley, New (St Philip and St James) with Arksey	SS Philip & James, Bentley; All Saints, Arksey		Vicar: Stephen Dickinson	7,667	
Burghwallis (St Helen) and Campsall	St Helen, Burghwallis; St Mary Magdalene, Campsall		Hon. Priest-in-Charge: Richard Walton; NSM: Christopher Herbert	4,934	
Doncaster (St Leonard and St Jude)	SS Leonard & Jude, Doncaster; St Luke, Scawthorpe		Curate-in-Charge: David D’Silva	13,291	
Sprotbrough (St Mary the Virgin)	St Mary the Virgin, Sprotborough		Rector: Amanda Barraclough; Curate: Robert Heaton	8,555	
Woodlands (All Saints)	All Saints, Woodlands		Vicar: Stephen Gardner	6,657	

=== Deanery of Doncaster ===
Benefice	Churches	Link	Clergy	Population served	Ref
Armthorpe (St Leonard and St Mary)	SS Leonard & Mary, Armthorpe		Oversight Minister: Tom Brown	14,458	
Barnby Dun (St Peter and St Paul)	SS Peter & Paul, Barnby Dun		Vicar: Tom Brown	3,730	
Kirk Sandall and Edenthorpe (Good Shepherd)	Good Shepherd, Kirk Sandall & Edenthorpe		Vicar: Tom Brown	9,905	
Bessacarr, West (St Francis of Assisi)	St Francis of Assisi, West Bessacarr		Vicar: Richard Heard	6,097	
Cantley (St Wilfrid)	St Wilfrid, Cantley		Vicar: Andrew Howard	13,276	
Cantley, New (St Hugh of Lincoln) (Holy Trinity)	St Hugh of Lincoln, New Cantley; Holy Trinity, Doncaster			10,746	
Doncaster (St George)	St George's Minster, Doncaster		Vicar: David Stevens; NSM: Susan Bedford; NSM: Sarah Walsh	1,948	
Doncaster (St James)	St James, Doncaster		Priest-in-Charge: Chris McCarthy; NSM: Mike Parnell	6,540	
Doncaster (St Mary) (St Paul)	St Mary, Wheatley		Priest-in-Charge: Adam Priestley	10,425	
Doncaster (St Mary) (St Paul)	St Paul, Wheatley Park		Priest-in-Charge: Adam Priestley	10,425	
Wheatley Hills (St Aidan) with Intake	St Aidan, Wheatley Hills; All Saints, Intake		Vicar: Adam Priestley	13,504	

=== Deanery of West Doncaster ===
Benefice	Churches	Link	Clergy	Population served	Ref
Conisbrough (St Peter)	St Peter, Conisbrough; Clifton Mission Church		Priest-in-Charge: Martijn Mugge	11,780	
Denaby Main (All Saints)^{1}	All Saints, Denaby Main		Vicar: Martijn Mugge	4,412	
Edlington (St John the Baptist) and Hexthorpe	St John the Baptist, Edlington		Vicar:	11,415	
Edlington (St John the Baptist) and Hexthorpe	St Jude, Hexthorpe		Vicar:	11,415	
Finningley (Holy Trinity and St Oswald) with Auckley	Holy Trinity & St Oswald, Finningley; St Saviour, Auckley		Rector: Neil Redeyoff	6,402	
Rossington (St Michael)	St Michael, Rossington		Rector/Priest-in-Charge: John Leal	13,536	
Rossington, New (St Luke)	St Luke, New Rossington		Rector/Priest-in-Charge: John Leal	13,536	
Tickhill (St Mary) with Stainton	St Mary, Tickhill; St Winifred, Stainton		Vicar: Alison Earl	5,437	
Wadworth (St John the Baptist) with Loversall and Balby	St John the Baptist, Wadworth; St John the Evangelist, Balby; St Katherine, Loversall		Vicar: Ian Smith; NSM: Elizabeth Strafford	14,149	
Warmsworth (St Peter)	St Peter, Warmsworth		Rector: Ian Smith	10,232	

^{1}in Crockfords this church is part of the Adwick-le-Street deanery

=== Deanery of Snaith and Hatfield ===
Benefice	Churches	Link	Clergy	Population served	Ref
Airmyn (St David), Hook and Rawcliffe	St David, Airmyn; St Mary the Virgin, Hook; St James, Rawcliffe		Vicar: Philip Ball	9,640	
Dunscroft (St Edwin)	St Edwin, Dunscroft		Priest-in-Charge: Vacant	6,437	
Fishlake (St Cuthbert) with Sykehouse and Kirk Bramwith with Fenwick and Moss	St Cuthbert, Fishlake; St Mary, Kirk Bramwith; Holy Trinity, Sykehouse		Curate: Paul Mellars	8,271	
Stainforth (St Mary)	St Mary, Stainforth		Curate: Paul Mellars	8,271	
Goole (St John the Evangelist) (St Mary) (Mariners' Club and Chapel)	St John the Evangelist, Goole		Vicar: Vacant	14,440	
Hatfield (St Lawrence)	St Lawrence, Hatfield		Vicar: Liz Turner-Loisel	10,870	
Marshland, The, Comprising Adlingfleet, Eastoft, Swinefleet, and Whitgift	All Saints, Adlingfleet; St Bartholomew, Eastoft; St Margaret, Swinefleet; St Mary Magdalene, Whitgift		Priest-in-Charge: Justine Smith	2,064	
Moorends (St Wilfrith)	St Wilfrith, Moorends		Priest-in-Charge: Vacant	5,081	
Snaith, Great (Holy Trinity) (St John the Baptist) (St Paul)	St Laurence Priory, Snaith; Holy Trinity, Cowick; St John the Baptist, Heck; St Paul, Hensall; St John the Baptist, Pollington		Team Rector: Eleanor Robertshaw; Curate: Diane Ryan; NSM: Peter Hibbs	6,164	
Thorne (St Nicholas)	St Nicholas, Thorne		Vicar: David Green	12,291	

=== Deanery of Tankersley ===
Benefice	Churches	Link	Clergy	Population served	Ref
Hoyland (St Peter) (St Andrew)	St Andrew, Hoyland		Vicar: Richard Parker	12,800	
Hoyland (St Peter) (St Andrew)	St Peter, Hoyland		Vicar: Richard Parker	12,800	
Penistone (St John the Baptist) and Thurlstone	St John the Baptist, Penistone; St Saviour, Thurlstone; St Aidan, Oxspring; St James, Midhopestones; St Anne, Carlecotes		Team Rector: David Hopkin	12,351	
Tankersley (St Peter), Thurgoland and Wortley	St Leonard, Wortley		Rector: Keith Hale	4,565	
Tankersley (St Peter), Thurgoland and Wortley	St Peter, Tankersley; St Paul, Pilley; Holy Trinity, Thurgoland		Rector: Keith Hale	4,565	
Worsbrough (St Mary) with Elsecar	Holy Trinity, Elsecar		Vicar: Vacant	6,700	
Worsbrough (St Mary) with Elsecar	St Mary, Worsbrough		Vicar: Vacant	6,700	
Worsbrough Common (St Luke) with Worsbrough St Thomas and St James	St Luke, Worsbrough Common; SS Thomas & James, Worsbrough		Vicar: Adrian Bateman	11,530	

=== Deanery of Wath ===
Benefice	Churches	Link	Clergy	Population served	Ref
Ardsley (Christ Church)	Christ Church, Ardsley		Vicar: Fiona Kouble	4,642	
Barnburgh (St Peter) with Melton On the Hill and Adwick-Upon-Dearne	St Peter, Barnburgh; St John the Baptist, Adwick-upon-Dearne; St James, High Melton		Priest-in-Charge: Kathryn Herrod	3,553	
Bilham, Comprising Brodsworth, Frickley, Hooton Pagnell, and Marr	St Michael & All Angels, Brodsworth; All Saints, Frickley; All Saints, Hooton Pagnell; St Helen, Marr		Priest-in-Charge: Kathryn Herrod	3,553	
Brampton Bierlow (Christ Church)	Christ Church, Brampton Bierlow		Vicar: Carol Ann Lacey	8,134	
Darfield (All Saints)	All Saints, Darfield		Rector: David Hildred	11,440	
Houghton, Great (St Michael and All Angels) Conventional District	St Michael & All Angels, Great Houghton		Vacant	11,440	
Goldthorpe (St John the Evangelist and St Mary Magdalene) with Hickleton	SS John the Evangelist & Mary Magdalene, Goldthorpe; St Wilfrid, Hickleton		Vicar/Priest-in-Charge: Carl Schaefer; Hon. Curate (Goldthorpe): Allen Briscoe	13,896	
Bolton-Upon-Dearne (St Andrew the Apostle)	St Andrew the Apostle, Bolton-upon-Dearne		Vicar/Priest-in-Charge: Carl Schaefer; Hon. Curate (Goldthorpe): Allen Briscoe	13,896	
Kendray (St Andrew)	St Andrew, Kendray		Vicar: Pete Jackson	5,799	
Kilnhurst (St Thomas)	St Thomas, Kilnhurst		Vicar: Andy Brewerton; Curate: Tom Brown	3,920	
Mexborough (St John the Baptist)	St John the Baptist, Mexborough		Priest-in-Charge: Edward Morrison	15,565	
Swinton (St Margaret)	St Margaret, Swinton		Vicar: Chris Barley	11,197	
Thurnscoe (St Helen) (St Hilda)	St Helen, Thurnscoe		Rector: Vacant	8,692	
Wath-Upon-Dearne (All Saints)	All Saints, Wath-upon-Dearne		Vicar: John Parker	10,211	
Wentworth (Harley Mission Church) (Holy Trinity)	Holy Trinity, Wentworth		Hon. Priest-in-Charge: Rev Marie Raffay	1,233	
Wentworth (Harley Mission Church) (Holy Trinity)	Harley Mission Church		Hon. Priest-in-Charge: Rev Marie Raffay	1,233	
Wombwell (St Mary) (St George)	St Mary, Wombwell; St George, Jump		Rector: John Armstrong	17,894	

=== Deanery of Attercliffe ===
Benefice	Churches	Link	Clergy	Population served	Ref
Arbourthorne (St Paul) and Norfolk Park	SS Paul & Leonard, Norfolk Park		Vicar: Vacant	9,511	
Attercliffe (St Alban) and Darnall	St Alban, Attercliffe; Church of Christ, Darnall (LEP)		Vicar: Vacant	14,301	
Beighton (St Mary the Virgin)	St Mary the Virgin, Beighton		Priest-in-Charge: Mike Healey	18,343	
Beighton (St Mary the Virgin)	Emmanuel, Waterthorpe (LEP)		Priest-in-Charge: Mike Healey	18,343	
Frecheville (St Cyprian)^{1}	St Cyprian, Frecheville		Rector: Vacant	7,956	
Gleadless (Christ Church)	Christ Church, Gleadless; St Peter, Basegreen		NSM: Ann Rhodes	15,909	
Gleadless Valley (Holy Cross)	Holy Cross, Gleadless Valley		Vicar: David Middleton; Curate: Stewart Deering	9,040	
Hackenthorpe (Christ Church)^{1}	Christ Church, Hackenthorpe		Vicar: Vacant	9,979	
Handsworth (St Mary)	St Mary, Handsworth		Rector: Keith Johnson	12,211	
Heeley (Christ Church)	Christ Church, Heeley		Vicar: Bob Evans	8,940	
Mosborough (St Mark)	St Mark, Mosborough		Vicar: Susan Stewart; NSM: Louise Castle	10,204	
Sheffield (St Catherine of Siena) Richmond Road	St Catherine of Siena, Sheffield		Vicar: Philip Knowles; Curate: Thomas Carpenter	10,575	
Sheffield (St John the Evangelist)	St John the Evangelist, Sheffield Park		Priest-in-Charge: Vacant	7,486	
Sheffield Manor (St Swithun)	William Temple Church, Manor Park (LEP); St Aidan with St Luke, Sheffield Manor; St Swithun, Sheffield Manor		Team Rector: Julie Upton; Associate Priest: Karen Colley; Assistant Curate: Sibylie Batten	14,520	
Woodhouse (St James)	St James, Woodhouse		Vicar: Vacant	12,037	

^{1}in Crockfords these churches are placed in Ecclesall Deanery

=== Deanery of Ecclesall ===
Benefice	Churches	Link	Clergy	Population served	Ref
Abbeydale (St John the Evangelist) and Millhouses	St John the Evangelist, Abbeydale; Holy Trinity, Millhouses		Vicar: Peter Ingram; NSM: Susan Sturgeon; NSM: Angie Lauener	10,703	
Dore (Christ Church)	Christ Church, Dore		Vicar/Priest-in-Charge: Katie Tupling; Curate (Dore): Neil Marchant; NSM: Ali Creasey	8,221	
Totley (All Saints)	All Saints, Totley		Vicar/Priest-in-Charge: Katie Tupling; Curate (Dore): Neil Marchant; NSM: Ali Creasey	8,221	
Ecclesall Bierlow (All Saints)	All Saints, Ecclesall		Vicar: Gary Wilton; Curate: Alistair Stevenson; Curate: Dan Christian	10,646	
Sheffield (St Mary) Bramall Lane	St Mary, Bramall Lane		Vicar/Priest-in-Charge: Claire Dawson; Curate (Endcliffe): Ed Pennington; Curate (Endcliffe): Rob Bridgewater; NSM (St Mary): Karen Cribb	23,925	
Endcliffe (St Augustine)	St Augustine, Endcliffe		Vicar/Priest-in-Charge: Claire Dawson; Curate (Endcliffe): Ed Pennington; Curate (Endcliffe): Rob Bridgewater; NSM (St Mary): Karen Cribb	23,925	
Endcliffe (St Augustine)	Christ Church, Endcliffe (2009)		Vicar/Priest-in-Charge: Claire Dawson; Curate (Endcliffe): Ed Pennington; Curate (Endcliffe): Rob Bridgewater; NSM (St Mary): Karen Cribb	23,925	
Greenhill (St Peter)	St Peter, Greenhill		Curate: Ned Lunn^{1}	12,206	
Greystones (St Gabriel)	St Gabriel, Greystones		Vicar: Peter Beckley	5,354	
Norton (St James)	St James, Norton		Rector:	7,749	
Norton Lees (St Paul)	St Paul, Norton Lees		Vicar: Murray Brown^{1}	12,314	
Psalter Lane (St Andrew)	St Andrew, Psalter Lane (LEP)		Vicar: Vacant	9,274	
Sheffield (St Matthew) Carver Street	St Matthew, Carver Street		Vicar: Grant Naylor; Hon. Curate: Alan Watson	5,687	
Sheffield (St Oswald) St Peter	St Oswald, Millhouses		Vicar: Anesia Nascimento Cook	9,161	
Woodseats (St Chad)	St Chad, Woodseats		Vicar: Toby Hole^{1}; Curate: James Norris	10,451	

^{1}these four clergy are also licensed as curates in each other's benefices

=== Deanery of Ecclesfield ===
Website: www.ecclesfielddeanery.co.uk

Benefice	Churches	Link	Clergy	Population served	Ref
Cornerstone Benefice, The, comprising Bolsterstone, Deepcar, and Stocksbridge	St Mary, Bolsterstone		Priest-in-Charge: Hilda Isaacson; NSM: Keith Crookes; Hon. Curate: Stephen Pendlebury	13,486	
Cornerstone Benefice, The, comprising Bolsterstone, Deepcar, and Stocksbridge	St John the Evangelist, Deepcar		Priest-in-Charge: Hilda Isaacson; NSM: Keith Crookes; Hon. Curate: Stephen Pendlebury	13,486	
Cornerstone Benefice, The, comprising Bolsterstone, Deepcar, and Stocksbridge	St Matthias, Stocksbridge		Priest-in-Charge: Hilda Isaacson; NSM: Keith Crookes; Hon. Curate: Stephen Pendlebury	13,486	
Bradfield (St Nicholas)	St Nicholas, Bradfield		Rector: Alan Isaacson	1,201	
Brightside (St Thomas and St Margaret) with Wincobank	St Margaret, Brightside; St Thomas, Wincobank		Vicar: Philip Warman	12,138	
Chapeltown (St John the Baptist)	St John the Baptist, Chapeltown		Vicar: Richard Stordy; NSM: Anwyl Whitehead	13,196	
Ecclesfield (St Mary the Virgin)	St Mary the Virgin, Ecclesfield		Vicar: Tim Gill	5,949	
Mortomley (St Saviour) High Green	St Saviour, High Green		Vicar/Priest-in-Charge: Simon Bessant; NSM (Grenoside): Claire Williams	13,734	
Grenoside (St Mark)	St Mark, Grenoside		Vicar/Priest-in-Charge: Simon Bessant; NSM (Grenoside): Claire Williams	13,734	
Oughtibridge (Ascension)	Ascension, Oughtibridge		Vicar: Chris Tufnell	6,639	
Pitsmoor (Christ Church)	Christ Church, Pitsmoor		Priest-in-Charge/Curate: Philip Salmon; NSM (Pitsmoor): Huw Thomas; NSM (St Cuthbert): Monica Sutton	31,104	
Ellesmere (St Peter)	St Peter, Ellesmere (LEP)		Priest-in-Charge/Curate: Philip Salmon; NSM (Pitsmoor): Huw Thomas; NSM (St Cuthbert): Monica Sutton	31,104	
Sheffield (St Cuthbert)	St Cuthbert, Fir Vale		Priest-in-Charge/Curate: Philip Salmon; NSM (Pitsmoor): Huw Thomas; NSM (St Cuthbert): Monica Sutton	31,104	
Sheffield (St Cecilia) Parson Cross	St Bernard of Clairvaux, Southey Green		Vicar/Priest-in-Charge: Keith Ryder-West; Curate: Andy Poultney (see below); NSM: Judith Daley	24,436	
Sheffield (St Leonard) Norwood	St Leonard, Norwood		Vicar/Priest-in-Charge: Keith Ryder-West; Curate: Andy Poultney (see below); NSM: Judith Daley	24,436	
Sheffield (St Paul) Wordsworth Avenue	St Paul, Wordsworth Avenue		Priest-in-Charge: Andy Poultney	7,745	
Shiregreen (St James and St Christopher)	SS James & Christopher, Shiregreen		Priest-in-Charge: David Dean-Revill	11,156	

=== Deanery of Hallam ===
Benefice	Churches	Link	Clergy	Population served	Ref
Crookes (St Thomas)	St Thomas, Crookes		Team Rector: Mick Woodhead; Curate: Tom Finnemore; NSM: Casey Strine	10,477	
Crookes (St Timothy)	St Timothy, Crookes		Priest-in-Charge: Malcolm Lambert	4,033	
Crosspool (St Columba)	St Columba, Crosspool		Priest-in-Charge: Iain Lothian^{1}	4,662	
Fulwood (Christ Church)	Christ Church, Fulwood		Vicar: Paul Williams; Curate: Ben Cooper; Curate: Pete Scamman; Curate: Andy Fearnley; Curate: Chris Tufnell	5,939	
Hillsborough and Wadsley Bridge (Christ Church)	Christ Church, Hillsborough & Wadsley Bridge		Priest-in-Charge: Philip Goodacre; NSM: Rebecca Otieno	8,933	
Lodge Moor (St Luke)	St Luke, Lodge Moor (LEP)		Vicar: Chris Stebbing^{1}	4,691	
Malin Bridge (St Polycarp)	St Polycarp, Malin Bridge		Vicar: Gina Kalsi; NSM: Carl Chapman; NSM: Louise Yaull	8,655	
Owlerton (St John the Baptist)	St John the Baptist, Owlerton		Vicar: Nick Dawson; Curate: Joy French	6,362	
Philadelphia (St Thomas) Extra-Parochial Place	St Thomas Philadelphia		Mission Priest: Peter Findley; Curate: Mike Rutter	N/A	
Ranmoor (St John the Evangelist)	St John the Evangelist, Ranmoor		Vicar: Matthew Rhodes	6,216	
Sheffield (St Mark) Broomhill	St Mark, Broomhill & Broomhall		Vicar: Sue Hammersley; Curate: Sarah Colver; NSM: Shan Rush	14,101	
Sheffield the Vine, Comprising Netherthorpe and Langsett	St Stephen, Netherthorpe; St Bartholomew, Langsett		Vicar: Will Briggs; NSM: Lucy Bolster	15,119	
Stannington (Christ Church)	Christ Church, Stannington		Priest-in-Charge: Nick Lattimer	10,551	
Wadsley (No Dedication)	Wadsley Parish Church		Priest-in-Charge: Dan Brown	9,632	
Walkley (St Mary)	St Mary, Walkley		Vicar: Melanie Fitzgerald	6,595	

^{1}these clergy are also licensed as curates in each other's benefices

=== Deanery of Laughton ===
Benefice	Churches	Link	Clergy	Population served	Ref
Anston (St James)	St James, Anston		Vicar: Jon Hidden; NSM: Barbara Cushing	9,076	
Aston Cum Aughton (All Saints) with Swallownest and Ulley	All Saints, Aston cum Aughton		Team Rector: Frances Eccleston; Curate: Dagmar Wilkinson	15,224	
Aston Cum Aughton (All Saints) with Swallownest and Ulley	Christ Church, Swallownest; Holy Trinity, Ulley		Team Rector: Frances Eccleston; Curate: Dagmar Wilkinson	15,224	
Dinnington (St Leonard)	St Leonard, Dinnington		Rector: Hilary Jowett	7,425	
Firbeck (St Martin) with Letwell	St Martin, Firbeck; St Peter, Letwell		Hon. Priest-in-Charge: Vacant	446	
Wales (St John the Baptist)	St John the Baptist, Wales		Vicar/Priest-in-Charge: Gary Schofield	9,424	
Harthill (All Hallows) and Thorpe Salvin	All Hallows, Harthill		Vicar/Priest-in-Charge: Gary Schofield	9,424	
Harthill (All Hallows) and Thorpe Salvin	St Peter, Thorpe Salvin		Vicar/Priest-in-Charge: Gary Schofield	9,424	
Maltby (St Bartholomew) (Ascension) (Venerable Bede)	St Bartholomew, Maltby		Team Rector/Priest-in-Charge: Mike Rajkovic; Curate (Maltby, Thurcroft): Keith Hanson	26,819	
Laughton-En-Le-Morthen (All Saints) and Throapham	All Saints, Laughton-en-le-Morthen		Team Rector/Priest-in-Charge: Mike Rajkovic; Curate (Maltby, Thurcroft): Keith Hanson	26,819	
Thurcroft (St Simon and St Jude)	SS Simon & Jude, Thurcroft		Team Rector/Priest-in-Charge: Mike Rajkovic; Curate (Maltby, Thurcroft): Keith Hanson	26,819	
Todwick (St Peter and St Paul)	SS Peter & Paul, Todwick		Priest-in-Charge: Vicky Camber	1,686	
Woodsetts (St George)	St George, Woodsetts		Vicar: Vacant	1,891	

=== Deanery of Rotherham ===
Benefice	Churches	Link	Clergy	Population served	Ref
Bramley (St Francis)	St Francis, Bramley		Vicar/Priest-in-Charge: Daran Ward; Hon. Curate: Neil Bowler	18,313	
Thrybergh (St Leonard)	St Leonard, Thrybergh; St Peter, Whinney Hill		Vicar/Priest-in-Charge: Daran Ward; Hon. Curate: Neil Bowler	18,313	
Clifton (St James)	St James, Clifton		Vicar: Vacant	15,061	
Dalton (Holy Trinity)	Holy Trinity, Dalton		Priest-in-Charge: Andrew Lee	11,487	
Ryecroft (St Nicolas) Rawmarsh	St Nicolas, Rawmarsh		Priest-in-Charge: Andrew Lee	11,487	
Greasbrough (St Mary)	St Mary, Greasbrough		Priest-in-Charge: Lyn Wortley; NSM (Greasbrough): Diane Etchell	19,801	
Rawmarsh (St Mary the Virgin) with Parkgate	St Mary the Virgin, Rawmarsh		Priest-in-Charge: Lyn Wortley; NSM (Greasbrough): Diane Etchell	19,801	
Herringthorpe (St Cuthbert)	St Cuthbert, Herringthorpe		Vicar: Karen Skidmore	9,880	
Kimberworth (St Thomas) (St Mark) and Kimberworth Park	St Thomas, Kimberworth; St John, Kimberworth Park		Priest-in-Charge: Vacant; Curate: Lyn Wortley (see above)	18,319	
Masbrough (St Paul)	St Paul, Masbrough		Vicar in charge: Phil Batchford	5,566	
Wickersley (St Alban)	St Alban, Wickersley		Rector/Priest-in-Charge: Peter Hughes; Hon. Curate: Neil Bowler (see above)	12,549	
Ravenfield (St James), Hooton Roberts and Braithwell	St James, Ravenfield; St James, Braithwell; St John, Hooton Roberts		Rector/Priest-in-Charge: Peter Hughes; Hon. Curate: Neil Bowler (see above)	12,549	
Rivers Team Ministry, The, Comprising Brinsworth, Catcliffe, Tinsley, and Treeton	St Andrew, Brinsworth; St Mary, Catcliffe; St Lawrence, Tinsley; St Helen, Treeton		Team Rector: David Bent; Team Vicar: Margaret Baker; Curate: Helen Bent; NSM: Phil Barringer	19,687	
Rotherham (All Saints)	Minster of All Saints, Rotherham; Chapel on the Bridge, Rotherham		Vicar: Canon Phil Batchford; Associate Vicar: Rachel Young; Associate Vicar: Ali Middleton; Curate: Sue Armstrong; Verger: Martyn Taylor	10,771	
Thorpe Hesley (Holy Trinity)	Holy Trinity, Thorpe Hesley (LEP)		Vicar: Lynn Broadhead	4,991	
Whiston (St Mary Magdalene)	St Mary Magdalene, Whiston		Rector: Vacant	8,852	

== See also ==
- Diocese of Hallam – Latin Catholic ecclesiastical territory in England

== Bibliography ==
- Church of England Statistics 2002
