= Brewis =

Brewis is a surname. Notable people with the surname include:

- Lady Anne Brewis (1911–2002), English botanist
- Alexandra Brewis Slade (née Brewis; born 1965), New Zealand-American anthropologist (and niece of Bev Brewis)
- Bev Brewis (1930–2006), New Zealand high jumper
- David Brewis, English singer, songwriter, and musician
- Hannes Brewis (1920–2007), South African rugby union player
- Harry Brewis (born 1991), English YouTube personality
- Henry Brewis (1932–2000), English artist and poet
- John Brewis (1920–1989), British politician and barrister
- John Brewis (priest) (1902–1972), English Anglican priest
- Peter Brewis, British composer and musician
- Peter Brewis (British musician), member of the band Field Music
- Robert Brewis, English footballer
- Tom Brewis (1907–1975), English footballer

== See also ==
- Fish and brewis, a traditional Newfoundland meal made with salt cod and hard tack
- Brewis Island in the Great Barrier Reef Marine Park in Australia
