= Carnelley =

Carnelley is an English surname. Notable persons with the surname include:

- Desmond Carnelley (1929–2020), Archdeacon of Doncaster
- Thomas Carnelley (1854–1890), English chemist
