= Congregational Church, Turffontein =

Church

Coordinates: 26°14′34″S 28°02′14″E

The Congregational Church in Turffontein, South Africa, was constructed in 1897 and opened in 1906 by Lord Selborne. The structure is decorated with Gothic features and at some point it became a community hall.

== History ==
The Congregational Church is a Christian movement brought to South Africa by the London Missionary Society. The founding principle is that each congregation is autonomous and decisions are taken by consensus. In 1897 the Johannesburg's first Congregational Church was built in Turffontein, by 1905 the congregation was nearing its completion under the guidance of architect Robert Howden. For the first eight years the pastor was Rev M. Richardson.
