= Javaid Iqbal (priest) =

British Anglican priest

- Archdeacon of Doncaster
- Diocese: Diocese of Sheffield
- In office: 2020–
- Predecessor: Steve Wilcockson

Orders
- Ordination: 1997 (deacon); 1999 (priest)

Personal details
- Born: 1971 (age 54–55)
- Denomination: Anglicanism
- Spouse: Mussarat Iqbal
- Children: 4
- Education: University of Birmingham

Javaid Iqbal (b 1971) is an Anglican priest, the Archdeacon of Doncaster since 2020.

Javaid Iqbal was born in Pakistan and educated at the University of Birmingham. He studied for the priesthood at St John's College, Nottingham and was ordained in 1999. He worked in Lahore before coming to Evington in 2005. He was then Priest in charge at Thurmaston and then Team Vicar for The Fosse Benefice. He was then Team Rector at Aldenham until his appointment as Archdeacon.

Church of England titles
Preceded by Bob Fitzharris	Archdeacon of Doncaster; 2020–	Succeeded by Incumbent
