= Bernard Holdridge =

British Anglican priest (1935–2021)

The Ven. Bernard Lee Holdridge SSC (24 July 1935 – 4 September 2021) was the Archdeacon of Doncaster from 1994 to 2001.

Holdridge was educated at Thorne Grammar School and Lichfield Theological College; and ordained in 1968. After a curacy in Swinton he held incumbencies in Hexthorpe, Rawmarsh and Worksop. He had been a Guardian of the Shrine of Our Lady of Walsingham since 1996.

Church of England titles
Preceded by Desmond Carnelley	Archdeacon of Doncaster; 1994–2001	Succeeded by Bob Fitzharris
