= West Riding Yeomanry =

Two regiments of West Riding Yeomanry Cavalry were formed in 1794, disbanded at the Peace of Amiens in 1802, and reformed in 1802 and 1803.

- The 1st or Southern Regiment of West Riding Yeomanry was reformed in 1803 and became the Yorkshire Dragoons in 1889.
- The 2nd or Northern Regiment of West Riding Yeomanry was reformed in 1802 and became the Yorkshire Hussars in 1819.
