= Roundell Palmer =

Roundell Palmer may refer to:

- Roundell Palmer, 1st Earl of Selborne (1812–1895), Lord Chancellor of Great Britain
- Roundell Palmer, 3rd Earl of Selborne (1887–1971), British Conservative politician
