= John Palmer, 4th Earl of Selborne =

British peer (1940–2021)

The Right Honourable The Earl of Selborne GBE DL FRS
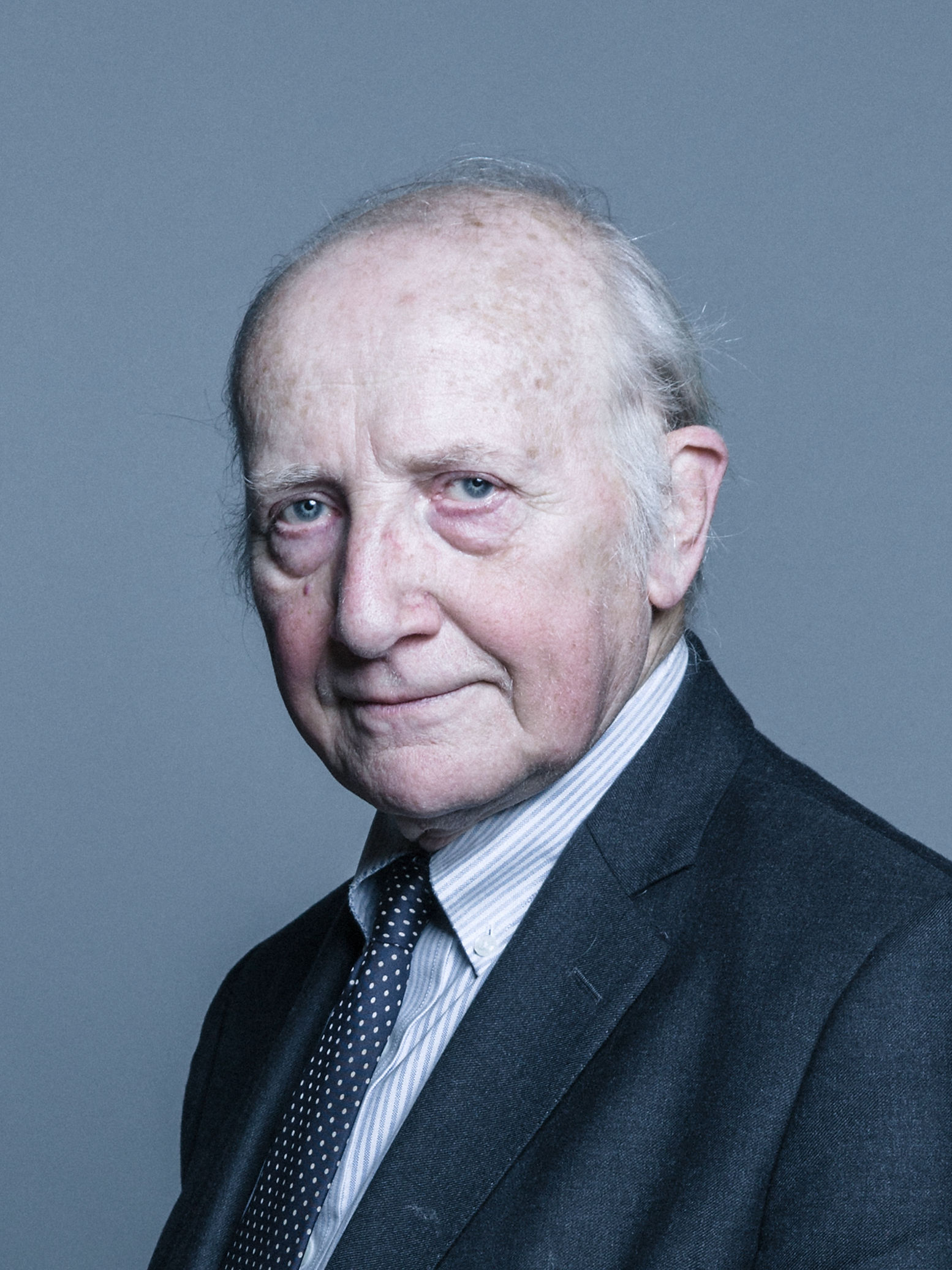

President of the Royal Geographical Society
- In office 1997–2000
- Preceded by: The Earl Jellicoe
- Succeeded by: Sir Ronald Cooke

Member of the House of Lords
- Lord Temporal
- Hereditary peerage 23 December 1971 – 11 November 1999
- Preceded by: The 3rd Earl of Selborne
- Succeeded by: Seat abolished
- Elected Hereditary Peer; 11 November 1999 – 26 March 2020
- Election: 1999
- Preceded by: Seat established
- Succeeded by: The 6th Baron Sandhurst

Personal details
- Born: 12 March 1940
- Died: 12 February 2021 (aged 80)
- Party: Independent
- Other political affiliations: Conservative (until 2019)
- Spouse: Joanna van Antwerp James
- Children: 4
- Relatives: Roundell Palmer, 3rd Earl of Selborne (grandfather)
- Education: Christ Church, Oxford

John Roundell Palmer, 4th Earl of Selborne (24 March 1940 – 12 February 2021) was a British peer, ecological expert, and businessman. He was one of the hereditary peers elected to remain in the House of Lords after the enactment of the House of Lords Act 1999, sitting as a Conservative. He re-designated as non-affiliated in September 2019 and retired from the House on 26 March 2020.

== Background and education ==
The son of Captain William Palmer, Viscount Wolmer (in turn son of Roundell Palmer, 3rd Earl of Selborne, and the Honourable Grace Ridley), and Priscilla Egerton-Warburton, Lord Selborne succeeded to his grandfather's titles in 1971; this was because his father had been killed in 1942 during a training exercise while serving with the Hampshire Regiment. He was educated first at St. Ronan's School, Hawkhurst, and at Eton and Christ Church, Oxford, where he graduated BA in 1961, later promoted to MA.

== Career ==
Lord Selborne was treasurer of King Edward's School, Witley, between 1972 and 1983, and a member of the Apple and Pear Development Council between 1969 and 1973. He was chairman of the Hops Marketing Board from 1978 to 1982, of the Agricultural and Food Research Council (AFRC) from 1982 to 1989, and of the Joint Nature Conservation Committee (JNCC) from 1991 to 1997. He was also a member of the NEDC Food Sector Group in 1991–1992, and a member of the Royal Commission on Environmental Pollution 1993 to 1998. He was a director of Lloyds Bank from 1994 to 1995, and of its successor Lloyds TSB Group from 1995 to 2004.

Selborne was president of the Royal Agricultural Society of England from 1987 to 1988, of the Royal Institute of Public Health and Hygiene from 1991 to 1997 and of the Royal Geographical Society from 1997 to 2000. From 1996 to 2006, he was the chancellor of the University of Southampton and between 2003 and 2009 he was chairman of the trustees of the Royal Botanic Gardens in Kew. In 1989, he was master of the Worshipful Company of Mercers. In 1991, he became a fellow of the Royal Society. He was also a fellow of the Linnean Society, vice-patron of the Royal Entomological Society, and patron of the Institute of Ecology and Environmental Management.

Selborne was appointed Knight Commander of the Order of the British Empire (KBE) in 1987 and Knight Grand Cross of the Order of the British Empire (GBE) in the 2011 New Year Honours for services to science.

== Personal life ==
In 1969 he married Joanna van Antwerp James. They had four children:

- William Lewis Palmer, 5th Earl of Selborne (born 1 September 1971)
- Hon. George Horsley Palmer (twin of Luke, born 12 March 1974)
- Hon. Luke James Palmer (twin of George, born 12 March 1974)
- Lady Emily Sophia Palmer (born 27 April 1978)

He died in February 2021 at the age of 80.

== Arms ==
Coat of arms of John Palmer, 4th Earl of Selborne
Crest A mount vert, thereon a greyhound sejant sable, collared or, charged on the shoulder with a trefoil slipped argent. Escutcheon Argent, two bars sable, charged with three trefoils slipped of the field; in chief a greyhound courant of the second, collared or. Supporters On either side a greyhound sable, collared or, and charged on the shoulder with a trefoil slipped argent. Motto Palma Virtuti (The palm is for virtue)

Peerage of the United Kingdom
Preceded by Roundell Palmer	Earl of Selborne; 1971–2021; Member of the House of Lords (1971–1999)	Succeeded by William Palmer
Parliament of the United Kingdom
New office created by the House of Lords Act 1999	Elected hereditary peer to the House of Lords under the House of Lords Act 1999; 1999–2020	Succeeded by The Lord Sandhurst
