= John Nicholson (priest) =

The Ven John Malcolm Nicholson (26 May 1908 – 2 December 1983) was the Archdeacon of Doncaster from 1955 to 1959.

He was educated at Whitgift School and King's College, Cambridge. After a period of study at Ripon College Cuddesdon He was ordained Deacon in 1932 and Priest in 1933. After a curacy at St John the Baptist, Newcastle upon Tyne he held incumbencies at Monkseaton, Denton Burn, Cullercoats and High Melton. He was Headmaster of The King's School, Tynemouth from 1959 to 1970.

Church of England titles
| Preceded by John Salusbury Brewis | Archdeacon of Doncaster; 1955 –1959 | Succeeded by Peter Geoffrey Bostock |
