= Roundell Palmer, 3rd Earl of Selborne =

British politician (1887–1971)

The Right Honourable The Earl of Selborne CH PC
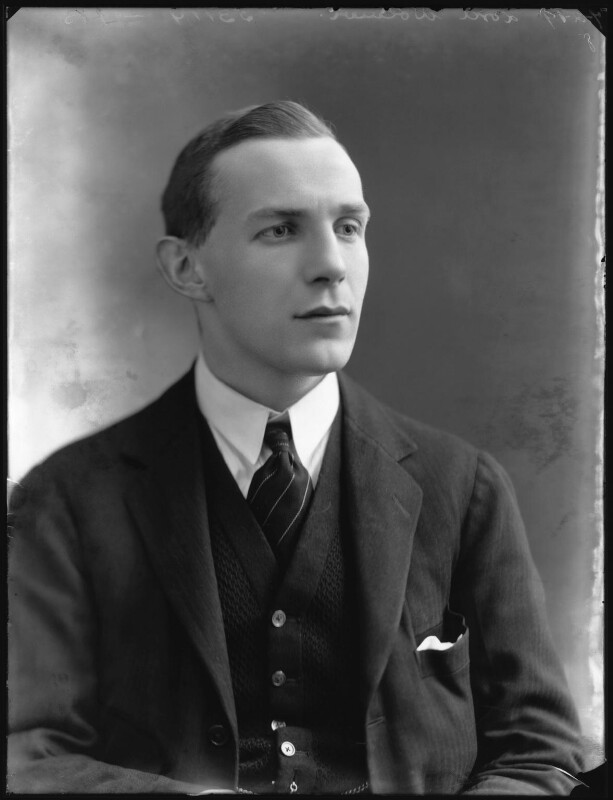
- Wolmer in 1919

Parliamentary Secretary to the Board of Trade
- In office 1922–1924
- Monarch: George V
- Preceded by: William Mitchell-Thomson
- Succeeded by: A. V. Alexander

Minister of Economic Warfare
- In office 1942–1945
- Preceded by: Hugh Dalton
- Succeeded by: Lord Lovat

Member of Parliament
- In office 20 December 1910 – 26 November 1940
- Preceded by: James Andrew Seddon
- Succeeded by: Oliver Lyttelton
- Constituency: Newton; Aldershot

Personal details
- Born: 15 April 1887 City of Westminster, London, England
- Died: 3 September 1971 (aged 84) Alton, Hampshire, England
- Spouse: Hon. Grace Ridley (m. 1910)
- Children: 6, including Lady Anne Brewis
- Parent(s): William Palmer, 2nd Earl of Selborne; Lady Maud Cecil
- Relatives: John Palmer, 4th Earl of Selborne (grandson)

Roundell Cecil Palmer, 3rd Earl of Selborne, CH, PC (15 April 1887 – 3 September 1971), known as "Top Wolmer" and styled Viscount Wolmer from 1895 to 1941, was a British administrator, intelligence officer and Conservative politician.

== Background and education ==
Born in the City of Westminster, Wolmer was the eldest son of William Palmer, 2nd Earl of Selborne and his wife, the former Lady Maud Cecil, daughter of Robert Cecil, 3rd Marquess of Salisbury. He was educated at Winchester College and graduated from University College, Oxford in 1909. He was the cousin of Robert Gascoyne-Cecil, 5th Marquess of Salisbury.

== Political career ==
A few months later, at the December 1910 general election Lord Wolmer entered Parliament as Member of Parliament (MP) for the Newton division of Lancashire. He was Parliamentary Private Secretary to his uncle, the Parliamentary Under-Secretary of State for Foreign Affairs, Lord Robert Cecil in 1916 and assistant director of the War Trade Department from 1916 to 1918. At the 1918 general election, he did not stand in Newton (which was won by the Labour Party politician, Robert Young), but was elected to the newly formed constituency of Aldershot that year. From 1922 to 1924, he was Parliamentary Secretary to the Board of Trade and Assistant Postmaster-General from 1924 to 1929.

In November 1940, Lord Wolmer resigned his seat in the Commons, and was called up to the House of Lords in his father's barony of Selborne in January 1941. He was Director of Cement at the Ministry of Works from 1940 to 1942.

In 1942, he inherited his father's earldom and his last political post was as Minister of Economic Warfare from 1942 to 1945. This put him in charge of the Special Operations Executive (SOE), which ran undercover operations of sabotage in Occupied Europe. It was his policy to back the Chetniks in Yugoslavia despite the numerous items of intelligence that suggested that they were in league with the Germans. He was responsible for a delay of 12 months in support being given to Tito's Partisans, and when Fitzroy MacLean was ordered to go to Cairo with a view to establishing contact with Tito, he did everything he could to frustrate the mission.

He was made a member of the Order of the Companions of Honour after the war and in 1948 was Master of the Worshipful Company of Mercers, then chairman of the National Provincial Bank from 1951 to 1953 and deputy chairman of Boots from 1951 to 1964.

== Family ==
On 9 June 1910, he married the Honourable Grace Ridley, third daughter of Matthew White Ridley, 1st Viscount Ridley. They had six surviving children:

- Lady Anne Beatrice Mary (1911–2002), married the Reverend John Brewis.
- William Matthew Palmer, Viscount Wolmer (1912–1942), married Priscilla Egerton-Warburton.
- Lady Laura Mary (1915–1999), married Cyril Eastaugh, Bishop of Peterborough.
- Hon. Robert Jocelyn (1919–1991), married Anne Palmer, 11th Baroness Lucas.
- Lady Mary Sophia (1920–2001), Hon. Anthony Strachey (son of Maurice Towneley-O'Hagan, 3rd Baron O'Hagan).
- Hon. Edward Roundell (1926–1974), married Joanna Bacon (a daughter of Sir Edmund Bacon, Bt).

Lord Selborne's wife died in 1959 and on 3 March 1966, he married Valerie Bevan née de Thomkahaza, a daughter of a Hungarian politician. His eldest son, Major William Wolmer, was killed on 2 October 1942 by a stray artillery shell during an army training exercise on the South Downs.

Upon Palmer's own death in 1971 in Alton, Hampshire aged 84, he was succeeded in his titles by his grandson, John.

== Arms ==
Coat of arms of Roundell Palmer, 3rd Earl of Selborne
Crest A mount vert, thereon a greyhound sejant sable, collared or, charged on the shoulder with a trefoil slipped argent. Escutcheon Argent, two bars sable, charged with three trefoils slipped of the field; in chief a greyhound courant of the second, collared or. Supporters On either side a greyhound sable, collared or, and charged on the shoulder with a trefoil slipped argent. Motto Palma Virtuti (The palm is for virtue)

Parliament of the United Kingdom
Preceded by James Seddon	Member of Parliament for Newton; Dec 1910 – 1918	Succeeded by Robert Young
New constituency	Member of Parliament for Aldershot; 1918–1940	Succeeded by Oliver Lyttelton
Political offices
Preceded by William Mitchell-Thomson	Parliamentary Secretary to the Board of Trade; 1922–1924	Succeeded by A. V. Alexander
Preceded by Hugh Dalton	Minister of Economic Warfare; 1942–1945	Succeeded by Lord Lovat
Peerage of the United Kingdom
Preceded by William Palmer	Earl of Selborne; 1942–1971	Succeeded by John Palmer
Preceded by William Palmer	Baron Selborne (writ of acceleration); 1941–1971	Succeeded by John Palmer
