= Evan Rogers (priest) =

English Anglican priest (1914–1982)

The Ven Evan James Gwyn Rogers (14 January 1914 – 30 March 1982) was Archdeacon of Doncaster from 1967 to 1979.

He was educated at St David's College, Lampeter and Wycliffe Hall, Oxford; and ordained Deacon in 1937 and Priest in 1938. After curacies in Walmersley and Rochdale he held incumbencies in Wigan and Coniston Cold.

Church of England titles
Preceded by Peter Geoffrey Bostock	Archdeacon of Doncaster; 1967 –1979	Succeeded by Ian Harland
