= Society of Conservative Lawyers =

Conservative think tank in the United Kingdom

Logo

The Society of Conservative Lawyers was founded in 1947 and is an affiliate of the Conservative Party of the United Kingdom. A leading Conservative think tank, the society also provides expert legal advice to the Conservative Front Bench and hosts debates on topical issues. Since its foundation generations of Conservative candidates have been selected from the Society's ranks.

== Founding and history ==
Founded in 1947, the society quickly became a leading Think Tank on law and legal issues for the Party and continues to help to shape manifestos and policy.

Its aims and objectives are to:

- Support the Conservative and Unionist Party
- Uphold the principle of justice and democracy
- Consider and promote reforms in the law
- Act as a centre for discussion of Conservative ideas
- Provide speakers and assist in finding candidates
- Promote and assist in the publication of literature

The society has a membership of lawyers with an interest in Conservative policy. It holds regular meetings and dinners with political themes.

== Notable members ==
The following either are current members or have been in the past

- The Rt Hon Baroness Thatcher LG OM
- The Rt Hon Lord Brittan of Spennithorne QC
- The Rt Hon Lord Howard of Lympne QC
- The Rt Hon Lord Howe of Aberavon CH QC
- The Rt Hon Lord Kingsland TD QC DL
- The Rt Hon Lord Lyell of Markyate QC
- The Rt Hon Lord Mackay of Clashfern KT
- The Rt Hon Lord Mayhew of Twysden QC DL

== Think tank ==
In addition to the programme of events, the Society has an active research wing. This is involved in helping the frontbench teams with legislation that is going through Parliament and policy formation. Traditionally the Chairman of Research has led the Society's thinking and in recent years other members have also published pamphlets and papers through the Society. The current Chairman of Research is Lord Sandhurst, QC.

== Current administration ==
- President: The Rt Hon Lord Mackay of Clashfern KT
- Chairman: The Rt Hon Lord Hunt of Wirral MBE
- Executive Chairman: Sarah Bool MP

== Recent publications ==
- Access to Justice: Four Essays with a foreword by Lord Faulks QC (2011)
- A Fresh Start on Sentencing, by John Riley (October 2008)
- The Impact of the Human Rights Act on the British Constitution, by Anthony Speaight QC (May 2007)
- The Impact of the Human Rights Act on the Work of the Courts, by Edward Faulks QC and Andrew Warnock (May 2007)

NB: These and other publications are available on the Society of Conservative Lawyers website which can be found here.

== See also ==
- List of UK think tanks
