= Peter Bostock =

The Ven Peter Geoffrey Bostock (24 December 1911 – 28 May 1999) was an Anglican Archdeacon in the second half of the Twentieth century.

He was educated at Charterhouse and The Queen's College, Oxford. After a period of study at Wycliffe Hall, Oxford he was ordained Deacon in 1935 in Mombasa Cathedral and Priest in 1937. He was a CMS Missionary in Kenya from 1935 to 1958; and Archdeacon of Mombasa from 1953 until 1958. Returning to England he was Vicar of High Melton and Archdeacon of Doncaster from 1967 to 1967. Finally he was Assistant Secretary of the Missionary and Ecumenical Council of the Church Assembly until his retirement in 1971.

In retirement he lived in Oxford and was active in support of Amnesty International and CND. He died in 1999. He had a wife Elizabeth, 4 children and 9 grandchildren.

Church of England titles
Preceded by Leonard James Beecher	Archdeacon of Mombasa; 1953 –1958	Succeeded by Peter Mwang'ombe
Preceded by John Malcolm Nicholson	Archdeacon of Doncaster; 1959 –1967	Succeeded by Evan James Gwyn Rogers
