= Guy Mansfield, 6th Baron Sandhurst =

British barrister and hereditary peer (born 1949)

The Right Honourable The Lord Sandhurst KC
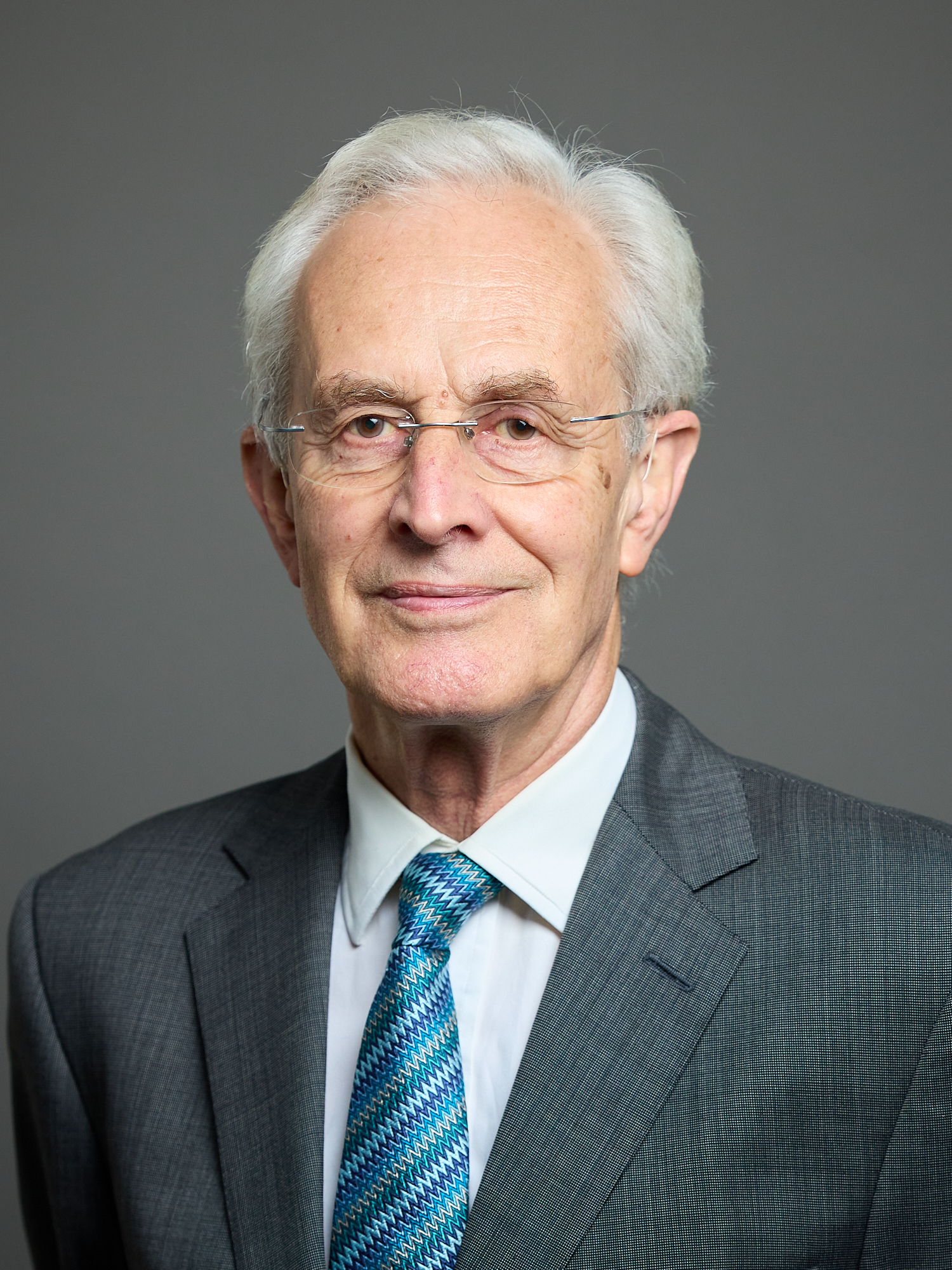
- Official portrait, 2025

Member of the House of Lords
- Lord Temporal
- Elected Hereditary Peer; 23 June 2021 – 29 April 2026
- By-election: 2021
- Preceded by: The 4th Earl of Selborne

Personal details
- Born: Guy Rhys John Mansfield; 3 March 1949 (age 77)
- Party: Conservative
- Parent: John Terence Mansfield DFC, 5th Baron Sandhurst and Janet Mary (née Lloyd)
- Occupation: Barrister
- Awards: Took silk

Guy Rhys John Mansfield, 6th Baron Sandhurst, KC (born 3 March 1949), is a British barrister, hereditary peer and former Conservative member of the House of Lords.

He served as Chairman of the General Council of the Bar in 2005. He is the current Chairman of Research for the Society of Conservative Lawyers.

Lord Sandhurst was elected as a member of the House of Lords on 17 June 2021 in a Conservative hereditary peers' by-election. He took office on 23 June 2021. He made his maiden speech on 14 September 2021 during the Crime, Police & Sentencing Bill.

Peerage of the United Kingdom
Preceded by John Terence Mansfield, 5th Baron Sandhurst	Baron Sandhurst; 2002–present	Incumbent; Heir apparent: Hon. Edward Mansfield
Parliament of the United Kingdom
Preceded by The Earl of Selborne	Elected hereditary peer to the House of Lords under the House of Lords Act 1999; 2021–2026	Position abolished under the House of Lords (Hereditary Peers) Act 2026
