= Folliott Sandford (priest) =

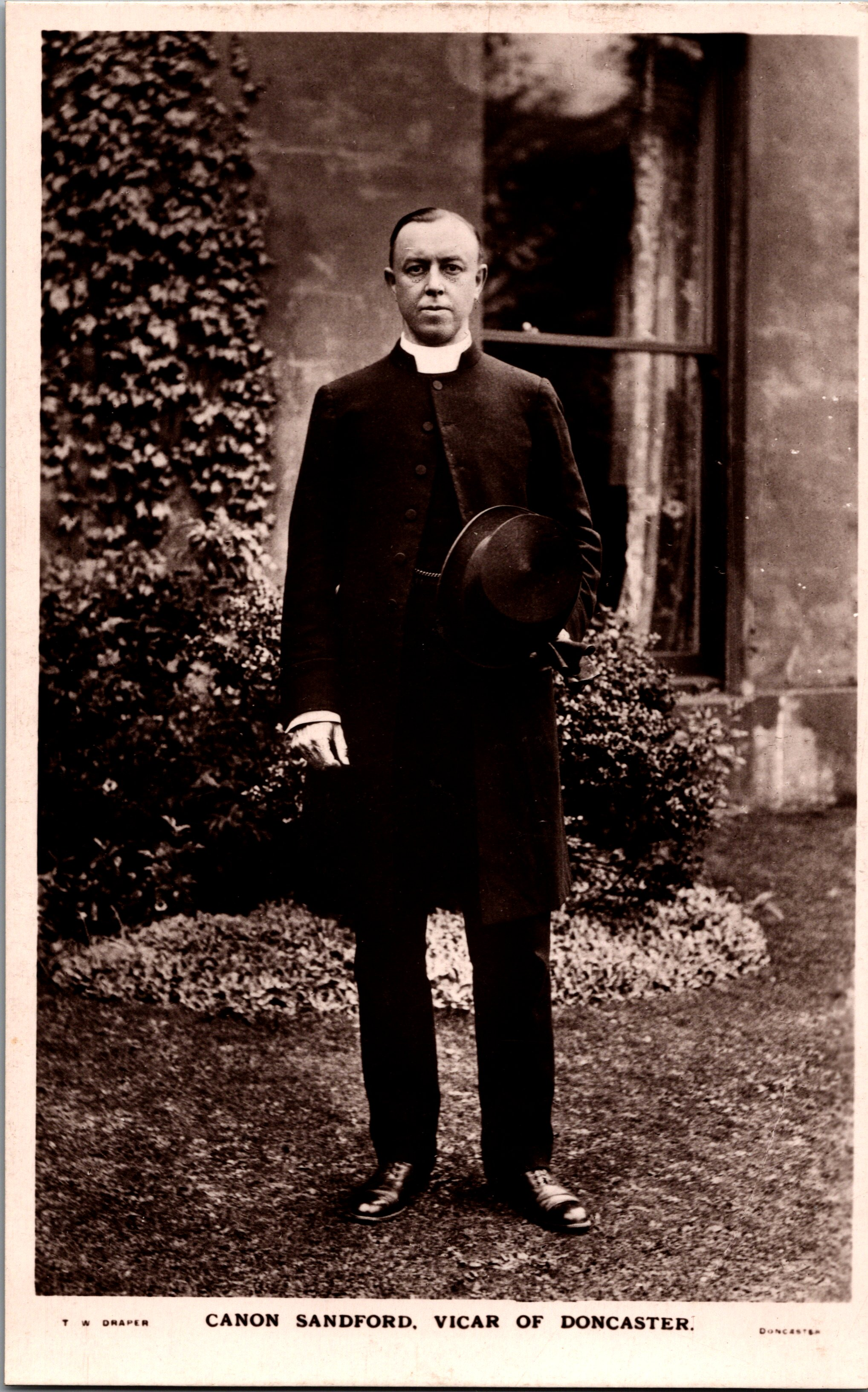

The Ven Folliott George Sandford (26 April 1861 in Sheffield – 14 July 1945 in Tickhill) was the inaugural Archdeacon of Doncaster.

He was born into an ecclesiastical family and educated at Sheffield Collegiate School and Corpus Christi College, Cambridge. He was ordained in 1884 and his first post was as a Curate at Sheffield Parish Church. In 1888 he married Rosamond Mary Blakelock and also became Rector of Holy Trinity Church, Goodramgate, York. He became Vicar of St Andrew's Sharrow in 1893; and Vicar and Rural Dean of Huddersfield in 1903. He was Chaplain to the 2nd Duke of Wellington's West Riding Regiment; from 1903 to 1905; Chaplain to the Queen's Own Yorkshire Dragoons from 1905 onwards He was Vicar of Doncaster from 1905 to 1928; Rural Dean of Doncaster from 1910 to 1919; Prebendary of Dunnington in York Minster from 1909 to 1914; Archdeacon of Doncaster from 1913 to 1941 and Chaplain to the Corporation of Doncaster during the same period; and an Honorary Canon of Sheffield Cathedral from 1914.

Church of England titles
Preceded by Inaugural appointment	Archdeacon of Doncaster; 1913 –1941	Succeeded by Robert William Stannard
