= Steve Wilcockson =

British retired Anglican priest

Stephen Anthony (Steve) Wilcockson (b Connah's Quay May 1951) is a British retired Anglican priest who served as the Archdeacon of Doncaster from 2012 until 31 December 2019.

Wilcockson was educated at Birkenhead Park High Grammar School for Boys and the University of Nottingham. He studied for the priesthood at Wycliffe Hall, Oxford and was ordained in 1976. After curacies in Pudsey and Wandsworth he held incumbencies at Rock Ferry, Lache-cum-Saltney and [Howell Hill, Surrey[Burgh Heath]]. He was Parish Development Officer for the Diocese of Chester from 2009 to 2012.

Church of England titles
Preceded by Bob Fitzharris	Archdeacon of Doncaster; 2012 –2019	Succeeded by Javaid Iqbal
