= Queen's Own Yorkshire Dragoons =

Yeomanry regiment of the British Army (1794–1956)

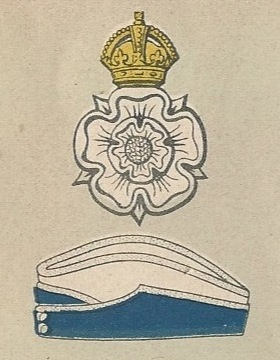
- Badge and service cap as worn at the outbreak of the Second World War
- Active: 1794–1956
- Country: Kingdom of Great Britain (1794–1800); United Kingdom (1801–1956)
- Branch: Territorial Army
- Type: Yeomanry
- Size: 1-3 Regiments
- Garrison/HQ: Nether Hall, Doncaster
- Engagements: Second Boer War; First World War France and Flanders 1915–18 Second World War Syria 1941 North Africa 1942–43 Italy 1944
- Battle honours: See battle honours below

The Queen's Own Yorkshire Dragoons was a yeomanry regiment of the British Army in existence from 1794 to 1956. It was formed as a volunteer cavalry force in 1794 during the French Revolutionary Wars. Its volunteer companies played an active role with the Imperial Yeomanry in the Second Boer War, but opportunities for mounted action were much more restricted during the First World War and it was temporarily converted into a cycle unit. It remained a cavalry regiment throughout the interwar years, and was the last horsed unit of the British Army to see action, in the Syria–Lebanon Campaign of 1941, finally mechanising the following year. It served as motorised infantry in the North African and Italian campaigns of the Second World War. In 1956, it merged with the Yorkshire Hussars and the East Riding of Yorkshire Yeomanry to form the Queen's Own Yorkshire Yeomanry. Its lineage is continued today by A (Yorkshire Yeomanry) Squadron, the Queen's Own Yeomanry.

== French Revolutionary and Napoleonic Wars ==
After Britain was drawn into the French Revolutionary Wars, Prime Minister William Pitt the Younger proposed on 14 March 1794 that the counties should form a force of Volunteer Yeoman Cavalry (Yeomanry) that could be called on by the King to defend the country against invasion or by the Lord Lieutenant to subdue any civil disorder within the county. As Lord Lieutenant the Duke of Norfolk presided over a meeting at Pontefract that agreed to raise such a force in the West Riding of Yorkshire and at a second meeting at Doncaster in May 1794 the borough corporation subscribed £525 towards the costs. Two regiments were formed on 13 August: the 1st or Southern Corps of West Riding Yeomanry Cavalry at Pontefract and the 2nd or Northern Regiment on 13 August: these later became the Yorkshire Dragoons and the Yorkshire Hussars respectively. A local landowner, William Fitzwilliam, 4th Earl Fitzwilliam of Wentworth Woodhouse, was colonel-commandant of both corps and Bryan Cooke of Owston Hall was lieutenant-colonel of the 1st Corps. Each regiment initially consisted of five Troops of 50 men each, those of the 1st Corps being at Doncaster, Pontefract, Barnsley, and two at Rotherham. The first parade of the Doncaster Troop in uniform took place on 29 August and on 8 November all five troops were paraded at Doncaster for the presentation of standards. Subsequently, further troops were added to the Southern regiment, one at Sheffield and three at Strafforth and Tickhill.

Each troop assembled monthly, and annual training between 1795 and 1801 normally took place at Doncaster (Leeds in 1799, when 14 days' training was undertaken). The Rotherham and Barnsley Troops were thanked by the magistrates in January 1795 for their assistance to the civil power at Wath upon Dearne. The Peace of Amiens saw most of the Yeomanry disbanded, including the Southern West Riding regiment in April 1802. However, the peace quickly broke down and a meeting convened by Earl Fitzwilliam (now the Lord Lieutenant of the West Riding) on 16 July 1803 resolved to re-raise it under the command of Lt-Col Francis Ferrand Foljambe of Aldwark, MP. It was again based at Doncaster, but now consisted of 12 troops, at Barnsley, Tickhill, Doncaster, Hatfield, Rotherham, Kiveton Park, Pontefract, Wath Wood (two), Wakefield and Sheffield (two). The Southern Regiment was now the largest in Yorkshire, but the threat of invasion brought more regiments and independent troops into existence, so that the West Yorkshire Yeomanry became a force of 1600 men in 33 troops. When an invasion beacon was mistakenly lit and the Yeomanry and Volunteers were called out on 15 August 1805, the Southern Regiment immediately mustered with the local infantry volunteers. James Stuart-Wortley (later created Lord Wharncliffe), a politician and former colonel in the 1st Foot Guards, assumed command of the Southern Regiment in 1810 and held it for 35 years.

== 19th century ==
The Yeomanry declined in importance and strength after the end of the French wars, but the South West York Yeomanry was one of the few regiments that maintained a continuous existence. In 1840–2 it saw considerable service in suppressing the Chartist riots and new troops were raised at Morley and Agbrigg on 2 June 1842. On 16 June 1844 the regiment was reorganised as the 1st West York Yeomanry Cavalry (1st WYYC), with the Morley and Agbrigg Troops being detached to form the 2nd West York Yeomanry Cavalry at Halifax.

The 1st WYYC was commanded by Lord Wharncliffe until his death in 1845. William Wentworth-Fitzwilliam, Viscount Milton (later 6th Earl Fitzwilliam) became Colonel on 4 May 1846 and remained in command for 40 years, with several of his brothers and sons serving as officers in the regiment, as well as members of the Stuart-Wortley family. In the 1850s the regiment used the Doncaster Mansion House as its officers' mess, and carried out training and drill on Doncaster Racecourse.

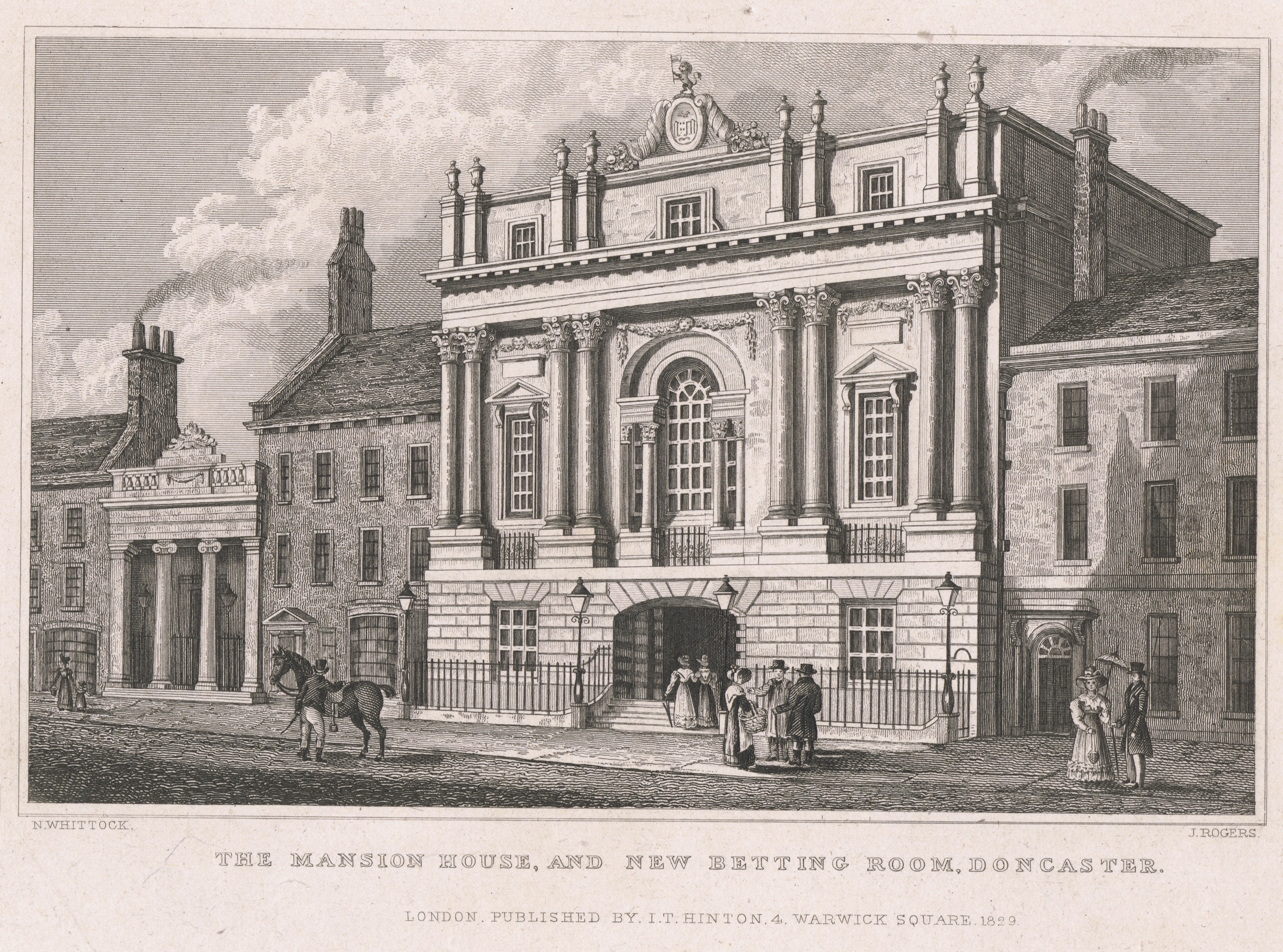
Doncaster Mansion House in the 19th century

The 1st WYCC was reorganised into eight troops in 1871:

- A Troop at Sheffield
- B Troop at Kiveton Park
- C Troop at Doncaster
- D Troop at Barnsdale
- E Troop at Wentworth Park
- F Troop at Pontefract
- G Troop at Barnsley
- H Troop at Wakefield

Earl Fitzwilliam became honorary colonel of the regiment on 25 December 1886 when his younger son the Hon Charles Wentworth-FitzWilliam (a former captain in the Royal Horse Guards and major of the 1st WYY since 26 May 1873) took command as Lt-Col.

Having been Hussars, the regiment progressively adopted Dragoon style, and was officially renamed the Yorkshire Dragoons in 1889. It was affiliated to the 6th Dragoon Guards (Carabiniers) and adopted that regiment's uniform with minor alterations. In 1893 it reorganised into three squadrons:

- A Squadron, with A & B Troops at Sheffield, C Troop at Rotherham
- B Squadron, with A Troop at Pontefract, B & C Troops at Wakefield
- C Squadron, with A & B Troops at Doncaster, C at Barnsley

A fourth squadron was added in 1894 when the 2nd WYYC was disbanded:

- D Squadron with A Troop at Huddersfield, B Troop at Halifax, C Troop at Bradford

Following the Cardwell Reforms a mobilisation scheme began to appear in the Army List from December 1875. This assigned Regular and Yeomanry units places in an order of battle of corps, divisions and brigades for the 'Active Army', even though these formations were entirely theoretical, with no staff or services assigned. The 1st West Yorkshire Yeomanry were part of the Cavalry Brigade of VII Corps based at Doncaster, alongside three Regular cavalry regiments and a Royal Horse Artillery battery, while the 2nd West Yorkshire Yeomanry were assigned as 'divisional troops' to 3rd Division of VIII Corps based at Northampton, alongside Regular and Militia units of infantry, artillery and engineers. In 1894 the 2nd West Yorkshire Yeomanry was disbanded, but some of the personnel formed a fourth squadron for the Yorkshire Dragoons. From 1893 the Yorkshire Dragoons, Yorkshire Hussars and (until its disbandment) the 2nd West York Yeomanry, were brought together as the 13th Yeomanry Brigade, with its HQ at York.

The Earl of Scarbrough, formerly of the 7th Hussars, took over as Lt-Col on 25 December 1891, having commanded the Doncaster Troop since 1885.

Finally, in 1897, after the Sheffield squadron had the honour of escorting Her Majesty, Queen Victoria, at Sheffield and being represented at the Royal celebration of that year, the regiment became known as the Queens Own Yorkshire Dragoons.

== Imperial Yeomanry ==
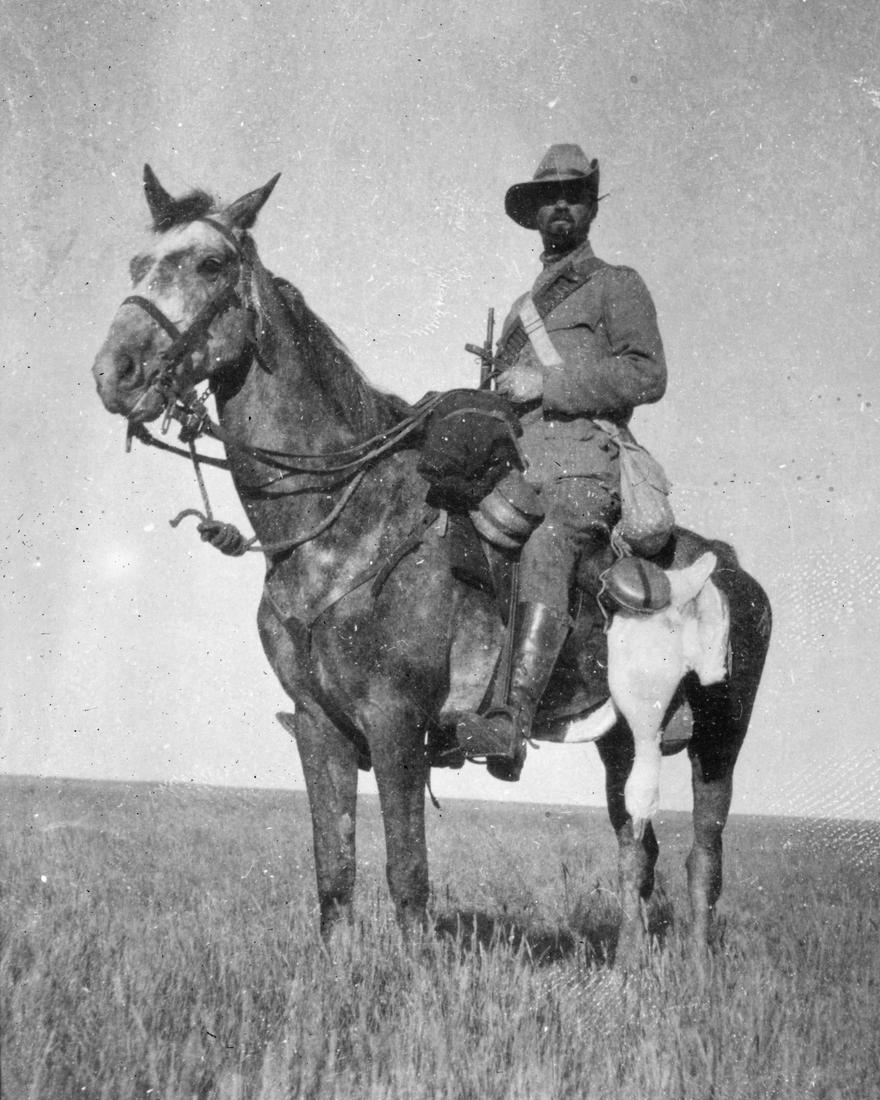
Imperial yeoman on the Veldt.

The Yeomanry was not intended to serve overseas, but due to the string of defeats during Black Week in December 1899, the British government realised they were going to need more troops than just the regular army. A Royal Warrant was issued on 24 December 1899 to allow volunteer forces to serve in the Second Boer War. The Royal Warrant asked standing Yeomanry regiments to provide service companies of approximately 115 men each for the Imperial Yeomanry, which was equipped to operate as Mounted infantry. The regiment provided: The Yorkshire Dragoons sponsored the 11th (Yorkshire Dragoons) Company and the Yorkshire Hussars the 9th (Yorkshire (Doncaster)) Company. An equipment and emergency fund was set up and by 2 January 1900 13th Yeomanry Brigade had enrolled 330 volunteers (180 from the Dragoons) at Leeds. Selection and mobilisation began at Sheffield Cavalry Barracks on 6 January and the two companies were completed by 17 January. Along with two companies from Nottinghamshire, the 9th and 11th served in the 3rd Battalion, IY, which was placed under the command of Temporary Lt-Col George Younghusband from the Indian Army. The Earl of Scarbrough was appointed second-in-command as a Temporary Major.

3rd Battalion with its horses embarked on Winifredian at Liverpool on 29 January and was the first IY battalion to arrive in South Africa, disembarking at Cape Town on 20 February 1900.

The Yorkshire Dragoons and Hussars also co-sponsored the 66th (Yorkshire) Company, formed in March 1900. The 66th Company arrived in South Africa on 10 April and joined in the 16th Battalion, IY, transferring to the 3rd when the 16th was broken up in 1902. The Yorkshire Dragoons later raised the 111th (Yorkshire Dragoons) Company for the Second Contingent of the IY in 1902.

=== Boshof ===
The 3rd Bn IY was attached to 1st Division under the command of Lord Methuen. On 5 April Methuen learned of the presence of a small Boer Commando led by the French Comte de Villebois-Mareuil and ordered the IY and other mounted troops to saddle up at once. The force caught the commando, pinned it with a few rounds of artillery fire, and then advanced by short rushes. The Earl of Scarbrough led the Yorkshire contingent round the left flank while the Kimberly Mounted Volunteers went round the right, taking advantage of the natural cover. The whole force then closed in and stormed the hill. De Villebois-Mareuil was killed and his men surrendered. The Battle of Boshof was the first action for the new IY, but with little field training, only a brief musketry course, and few officers, they 'acted like veteran troops'. Methuen was 'much struck by the intelligent manner in which they carried out the attack and made use of cover'.

Boshof had been a dismounted action, but at Rooidam on 5 May the Yorkshire Dragoons seized a kraal at a gallop, which allowed them to secure a kopje from which they could enfilade the Boers' main position. Methuen's Column quickly became known as the 'Mobile Marvels'. On 14 May Methuen marched on Hoopstad and then continued into Orange Free State protecting the flank of Lord Roberts' main army. Methuen's column reached Bothaville on 24 May, but Roberts became concerned about his communications, so Methuen was switched to protecting the rear, and marched to Kroonstad, where his force arrived on 28 May, having completed a march of 168 miles (270 km) in 15 days over poor roads. On 30 May, Methuen was informed that the 13th (Irish) Bn IY was cut off at Lindley, and he rode with his own IY battalions to relieve them, covering 44 miles (71 km) in 24 hours. The mounted column had a five-hour fight to force its way past 3000 Boers led by Christiaan de Wet. Most of the force in Lindley had already surrendered, but Younghusband was able to free a number of the prisoners. Methuen then pushed on to relieve 9th Division, which was besieged at Heilbron, completing a march of 267 miles (430 km) in under a month.

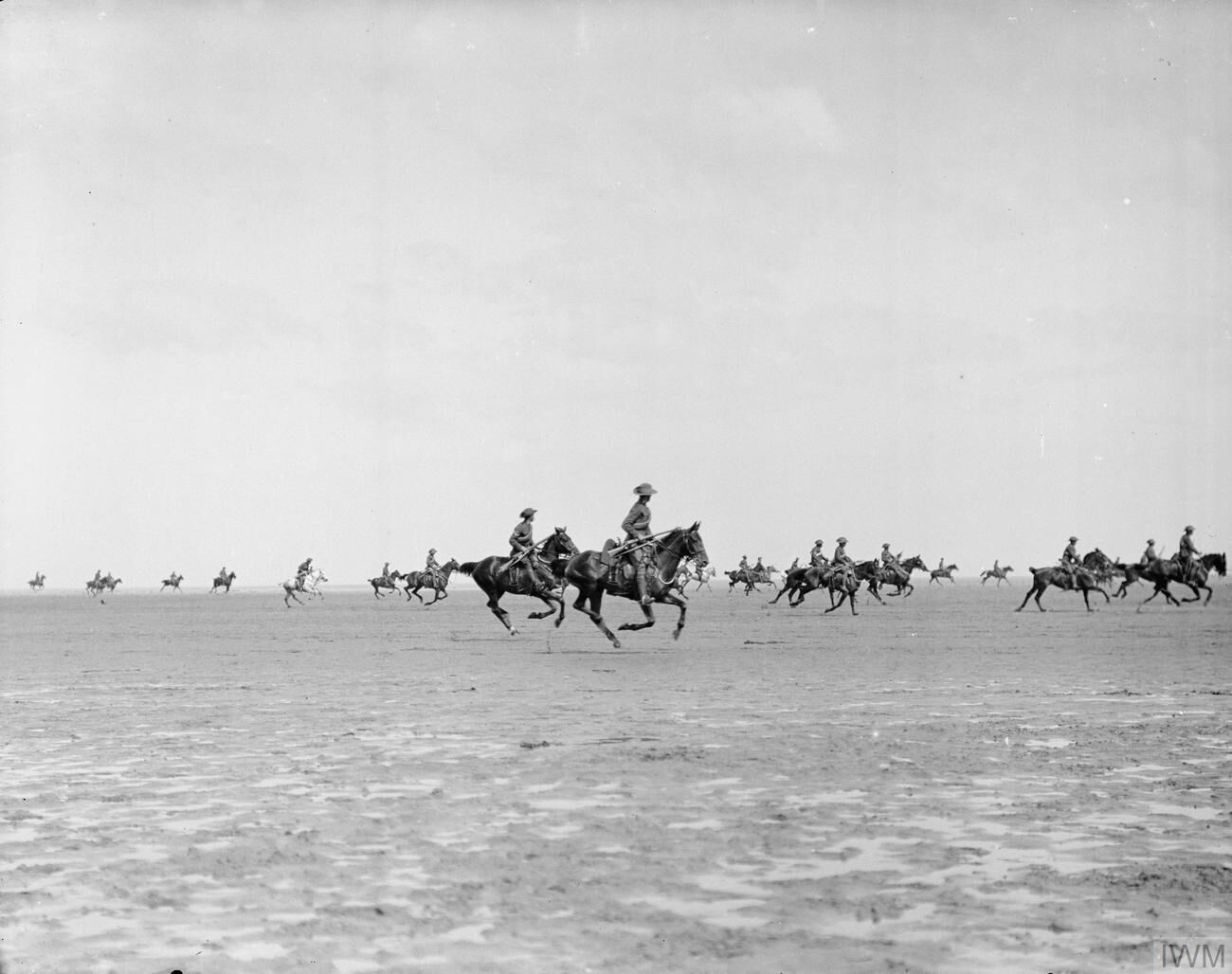
Imperial Yeomanry galloping over a plain during the Second Boer War.

=== Guerrilla warfare ===
Methuen's Column now took part in the pursuit of de Wet's force south down the railway towards Kroonstad, beginning with a sharp action at Renoster River on 24 June. The 'Great de Wet Hunt' began in earnest in August, with Methuen personally leading a column including the 1st Yeomanry Brigade. Methuen drove his force on with little rest, to Welverdiend Pass and Taaibosch Spruit, then to Frederikstad. On 12 August the column engaged the Boers at Mooi River Bridge for four hours, capturing guns and wagons and freeing British prisoners. Methuen's column had covered 150 miles (240 km) in six days, driving de Wet towards the Olifant's Nek pass, which Methuen believed was blocked by other columns. On the night of 13/14 August his troops set out to catch the Boers, engaging them at Buffelshoek about 6 miles (9.7 km) from the pass. However, the Boers escaped through the pass, which had not been blocked. With his troops exhausted, Methuen had to call off the pursuit.

Drives to catch the remaining commandos went on for almost another two years. The First Contingent of the Imperial Yeomanry completed their year's term of service in 1901. Between 24 March 1900 and 4 April 1901 the 3rd Battalion marched 3,171 miles (5,103 km) and was in action 39 times, suffering 109 casualties out of a strength of 500 men. The 66th Company in 16th Bn was in 16 major actions. Lieutenant Alexis Charles Doxat, who had gone out to South Africa in 11th Company, became reconnaissance officer to Maj-Gen Douglas's column and won a Victoria Cross at Zeerust on 20 October 1900, galloping back to rescue a man who had lost his horse.

Many of the Yeomanry went home after their year's service and were replaced by a Second Contingent, including the 111th (Yorkshire Dragoons) Company, which joined the 3rd Bn, while others stayed on during the gruelling last year of the war. At Middlepost on 5 February 1902 Lts Chichester and Tabor were sent up to hold a ridge with 11 men of the Yorkshire Dragoons. Both officers and five men were killed, the others wounded before they were overrun. The war ended on 31 May 1902 with the Treaty of Vereeniging. The service of its IY companies earned the Yorkshire its first Battle honour: South Africa 1900–02.

The Imperial Yeomanry had been trained and equipped as mounted infantry. The concept was considered a success and before the war ended the existing Yeomanry regiments at home were converted into Imperial Yeomanry, with an establishment of HQ and four squadrons with a machine gun section. This included the retitled Yorkshire Dragoons Imperial Yeomanry (Queen's Own).

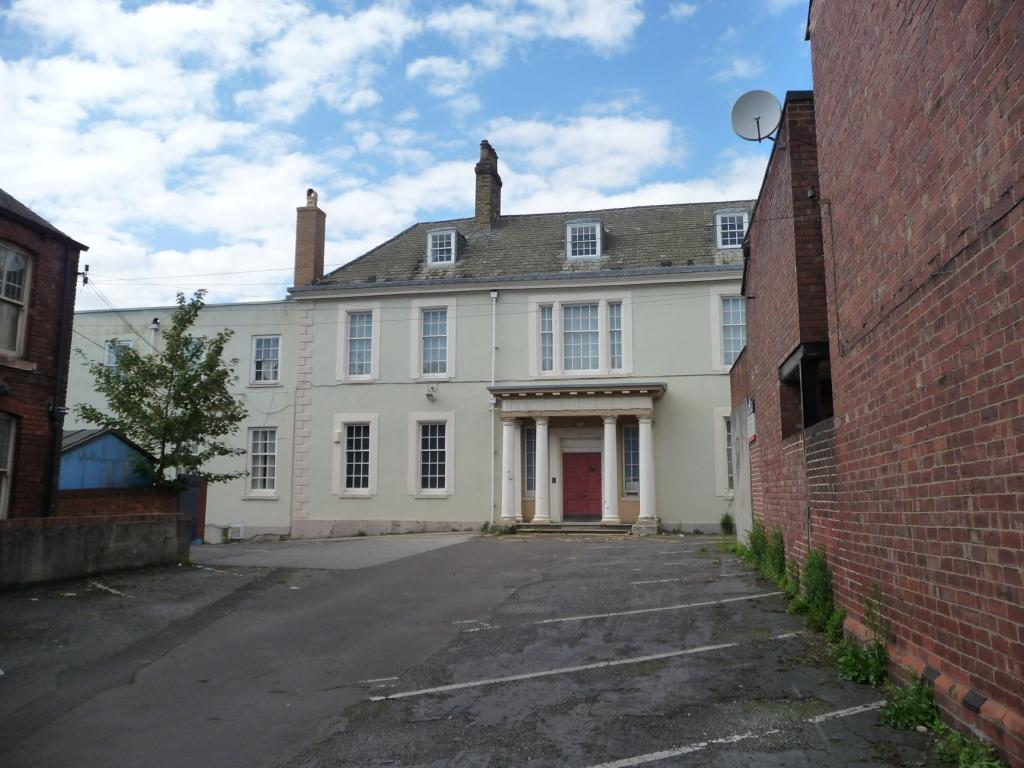
Nether Hall, Doncaster, RHQ in the early 20th century

== Territorial Force ==
The Imperial Yeomanry were subsumed into the new Territorial Force (TF) under the Haldane Reforms of 1908. The regiment became the Yorkshire Dragoons Yeomanry (Queen's Own) with the following organisation:

- Regimental Headquarters at Nether Hall, 4 Frenchgate, Doncaster
- A Squadron at 93 Brunswick Street, Sheffield, with a detachment at Wharncliffe Street, Rotherham
- B Squadron at Drill Hall, Vicarage Street, Wakefield, with detachments at Drill Hall, Bath Street, Dewsbury and Drill Hall, Beechnut Lane, Tanshelf, Pontefract
- C Squadron at Nether Hall, Doncaster, with detachments at Drill Hall, Eastgate, Barnsley and Pasture Road, Goole
- D Squadron at 9 Queen Street, Huddersfield, with a detachment at Halifax

The regiment formed part of the TF's Yorkshire Mounted Brigade, commanded by the Earl of Scarbrough, who relinquished command of the regiment to Lt-Col C. Brock and became Honorary Colonel.

== First World War ==
The regiment mobilised under the command of Lt-Col W. McK. Smith who had only been appointed CO on 3 June 1914. Among the regiment's officers was the Hon Edward Wood, MP, later (as Viscount Halifax) Viceroy of India and Foreign Secretary. The Regimental Chaplain was Canon Folliott Sandford, Archdeacon of Doncaster.

In accordance with the Territorial and Reserve Forces Act 1907 (7 Edw. 7, c.9) which brought the TF into being, it was intended to be a home defence force for service during wartime and members could not be compelled to serve outside the country. However, on the outbreak of war on 4 August 1914, many members volunteered for Imperial Service. Therefore, TF units were split in August and September 1914 into 1st Line (liable for overseas service) and 2nd Line (home service for those unable or unwilling to serve overseas) units. Later, a 3rd Line was formed to act as a reserve, providing trained replacements for the 1st and 2nd Line regiments.

=== 1/1st Queen's Own Yorkshire Dragoons ===
The 1/1st Yorkshire Dragoons deployed to France in July 1915, as Divisional Cavalry:

A Squadron to 17th (Northern) Division
B and HQ Squadrons to 37th Division
C Squadron to 19th (Western) Division

In May 1916, the regiment reassembled and became Corps Cavalry to II Corps, with whom it remained until November 1917, when it was transferred to the Cavalry Corps. Up to this time, its only chance of mounted action had been during the German retreat to the Hindenburg Line in April 1917. The regiment was present at the battles of the Somme (1916), the Ancre, the Somme (1917) and Ypres (1917). Although in these battles there was no mounted fighting, the men were often called upon to support infantry attacks with their Hotchkiss machine guns.

In December 1917, the Yorkshire Dragoons was posted to the 8th (Lucknow) Cavalry Brigade, 4th Cavalry Division, where it relieved the King's Dragoon Guards and took part in the Battle of Cambrai in 1917. As such, it was one of only six yeomanry regiments to be posted to a regular cavalry division in the war. (Note: The other five were: Bedfordshire Yeomanry in 1st Cavalry Division; Queen's Own Oxfordshire Hussars in 2nd Cavalry Division; Leicestershire Yeomanry in 3rd Cavalry Division; North Somerset Yeomanry in 3rd Cavalry Division; Essex Yeomanry also in 3rd Cavalry Division.)

The Yorkshire Dragoons was dismounted in February 1918, and returned to II Corps as Corps Cyclists. From September to November 1918, the regiment fought with the 9th Division in the offensive east of Ypres.

Hostilities came to an end on 11 November 1918 and the regiment was selected for the army of occupation and acted as advance guard to the 9th and 29th Divisions during the advance into Germany. The regiment was stationed in the Cologne area until demobilisation in July 1919, when Lord Scarborough received a letter of appreciation from the Corps Commander. "They have earned the gratitude of their country and county, in the way they have worked and fought all through the war, and have made a name for themselves which will never be forgotten".

=== 2/1st Queen's Own Yorkshire Dragoons ===
The 2nd Line regiment was formed in 1914. In 1915, it was under the command of the 2/1st Yorkshire Mounted Brigade in Yorkshire (along with the 2/1st Yorkshire Hussars and the 2/1st East Riding of Yorkshire Yeomanry) and by March 1916 was in the Beverley area. On 31 March 1916, the remaining Mounted Brigades were numbered in a single sequence and the brigade became 18th Mounted Brigade, still in Yorkshire under Northern Command.

In July 1916, there was a major reorganisation of 2nd Line yeomanry units in the United Kingdom. All but 12 regiments were converted to cyclists and as a consequence the regiment was dismounted and the brigade converted to 11th Cyclist Brigade. Further reorganisation, in October and November 1916, saw the brigade redesignated as 7th Cyclist Brigade in November, now in the Bridlington area. In March 1917, the regiment moved to Barmston and in July to Burton Agnes. It returned to Bridlington in January 1918.

About May 1918, the brigade moved to Ireland and the regiment was stationed at Fermoy, County Cork. There were no further changes before the end of the war.

=== 3/1st Queen's Own Yorkshire Dragoons ===
A 3rd Line regiment was formed in 1915. That summer, it was affiliated to 5th Reserve Cavalry Regiment at York. Early in 1917, it was absorbed into the 6th Reserve Cavalry Regiment at Tidworth.

== Between the wars ==
Postwar, a commission was set up to consider the shape of the Territorial Force (Territorial Army from 1 October 1921). The recent experience of the Great War made it clear that there was a surfeit of cavalry. The commission decided that only the 14 most senior regiments were to be retained as cavalry (though the Lovat Scouts and the Scottish Horse were also to remain mounted as "scouts"). Eight regiments were converted to Armoured Car Companies of the Royal Tank Corps (RTC), one was reduced to a battery in another regiment, one was absorbed into a local infantry battalion, one became a signals regiment and two were disbanded. The remaining 25 regiments were converted to brigades (Note: The basic organic unit of the Royal Artillery was, and is, the Battery. When grouped together they formed brigades, in the same way that infantry battalions or cavalry regiments were grouped together in brigades. At the outbreak of the First World War, a field artillery brigade of headquarters (4 officers, 37 other ranks), three batteries (5 and 193 each), and a brigade ammunition column (4 and 154) had a total strength just under 800 so was broadly comparable to an infantry battalion (just over 1,000) or a cavalry regiment (about 550). Like an infantry battalion, an artillery brigade was usually commanded by a lieutenant-colonel. Artillery brigades were redesignated as regiments in 1938.) of the Royal Field Artillery between 1920 and 1922. As the 9th most senior regiment in the order of precedence, the regiment was retained as horsed cavalry.

== Second World War ==
On the outbreak of the Second World War, the RHQ was at Danum Road, Doncaster, and the regiment was commanded by Colonel J.G. Crabbe.

The Queen's Own Yorkshire Dragoons was attached to the 5th Cavalry Brigade, part of the 1st Cavalry Division. When it became necessary to occupy Syria and the Lebanon to prevent their use by the Axis powers, the regiment was stationed on the Syrian frontier. It crossed the frontier in late June 1941, and occupied Kuneitra. In July, the regiment moved to Ezraa in order to contain the French Druse Garrison of Jebel Druse. On 10 July, C Squadron Headquarters and two troops fought a patrol skirmish with French Druse cavalry, which was probably the last action of British horsed cavalry. The Vichy French asked for an armistice on 12 July. From July until December, the regiment garrisoned the Jebel Druse, prior to moving to Azib to train for mountain warfare. On 13 February 1942 came the news that they were to be reroled and on 1 March the men said goodbye to their horses; by a matter of a day, the Queen's Own Yorkshire Dragoons gained the distinction of being the last active cavalry regiment in the British Army.

Intensive conversion training to becoming an armoured unit was carried out. In May, part of the regiment went up to the desert, taking part in the Battle of Gazala by holding the defensive box called “Knightsbridge”. This detachment subsequently withdrew to El Alamein after the disastrous First Battle of El Alamein, where they had carried out the camouflage and deception plans, particularly the representation of dummy tanks. In July, the regiment was hurriedly reunited and incorporated into "Delta Force", which was formed as the last line of defence in the event of the Alamein Line breaking.

Owing to heavy losses in armour in the recent battles, it was impossible to fulfil the Commander-in-Chief's promise that the Yorkshire Dragoons should become an Armoured Regiment; instead, the regiment was equipped with Bren Carriers, 3-inch mortars and 6-pounder anti-tank guns and placed under command of the 2nd Armoured Brigade, 1st Armoured Division, together with The Bays, the 9th Queen's Royal Lancers and the 10th Royal Hussars. Each motor squadron was under command of an armoured regiment, whilst the anti-tank guns were under command of the brigade. The Second Battle of El Alamein started on 23 October. By daylight of the 24th, the attack was partially successful but the final minefield was unbreached. The regiment suffered considerable casualties in the congested minefield areas prior to the breaking of the line on 2 November, when the 1st Armoured Division started the pursuit it led as far as Timimi.

At the end of January, the regiment went straight into the line at Medenine for the frontal attack on the Mareth Line that failed, after which 1st Armoured Division was moved round to the south to advance to El Hamma. In March, the attack on the Akarit Line was successful, and the division once again took up the pursuit.

The regiment remained in North Africa for a further eight months, during which time it converted to lorried infantry, becoming the 9th (Yorkshire Dragoons) Battalion, King's Own Yorkshire Light Infantry, as part of 18th (Lorried) Infantry Brigade. In February 1944, the brigade was sent to fight in the Italian Campaign, landing at Anzio under command of the 1st Infantry Division, which was temporarily under command of Mark W. Clark's US Fifth Army. An attack on 13 March cost the regiment 170 casualties in killed, wounded, and missing. These were not replaced until early May, prior to the breakout at the end of the month. On 3 June, they led the attack on the Ardea Line opening the road to Rome.

After a period of training, the regiment moved up to Florence, reverting to the command of 1st Armoured Division for the attack on the Gothic Line. The original men of the Yorkshire Dragoons, who had served four and a half years abroad (less six officers), were sent home at the end of August, prior to the attack. The first attack on Coriano Ridge secured a precarious foothold, but failed to achieve its objective. The regiment, which was in reserve, stabilised the position and three days later carried out an attack that took San Savino, where 600 prisoners were taken, and two days later they carried a further ridge. However, such was the shortage of infantry replacements in the British Army at the time, as all were being sent to 21st Army Group in the North West Europe Campaign, that 18th Infantry Brigade was broken up and the personnel were used to reinforce other units. The regiment was placed in ‘suspended animation’ and the majority of the officers and men were posted to the 2/4th Battalion, King's Own Yorkshire Light Infantry serving in the 138th Infantry Brigade of the 46th Infantry Division.

== Postwar ==
When the TA was reconstituted in 1947, the Queen's Own Yorkshire Dragoons reformed as an armoured regiment in the Royal Armoured Corps. Together with the Yorkshire Hussars, the East Riding Yeomanry and 45th/51st (Leeds Rifles) Royal Tank Regiment it constituted the 8th (Yorkshire) Armoured Brigade in 49th (West Riding and North Midland) Armoured Division. On 1 November 1956 the Yorkshire Dragoons, Yorkshire Hussars and East Riding Yeomanry were amalgamated to form the Queen's Own Yorkshire Yeomanry.

== Uniforms and insignia ==
The uniform of both the Southern and Northern West Riding Yeomanry in 1794 was a long-skirted scarlet coat with green collar and cuffs, and silver fringed epaulettes for officers; white breeches and black boots; white belts and gloves. The trumpeters were mounted on grey horses from October 1794. The original headgear was a 'round hat' (a low top hat) with a fore-and-aft bearskin crest over the crown. The original uniforms were such poor quality that they were replaced the following year, when new pattern 'Tarleton' light cavalry helmets were issued with 'Y.W.R.C' on the front band and probably a buff 'turban' (but re-using the same bearskin crest) and the shorter red jackets were given buff silk cord trimmings and white metal shoulder-wings for the men, with silver fringes for the officers. A scarlet waistcoat trimmed in buff was added (from 1797 the trumpeters wore a plain buff waistcoat). Sergeant-Majors (one per Troop, all ex-Regular NCOs) wore four silver chevrons on a green ground, sergeants wore three similar chevrons. When the regiment was reclothed again in 1799 the jacket was replaced by an Austrian-style light dragoon jacket and the helmet turban was changed to green.

Three standards were presented to the Southern Regiment of West Riding Yeomanry on 8 November 1794: a Royal Standard given by Doncaster Corporation, a Provincial Standard bearing the arms of York given by Earl Fitzwilliam, and a third given by the ladies of Rotherham bearing the motto 'Law, Liberty and Religion'. Each standard bore the inscription South Regiment, W.R.Y.C.'.

When the regiment was re-raised in 1803 the jacket colour was changed from red to dark blue, with dark blue pantaloons (later light blue overalls), and brown Hessian boots. This uniform was still worn with the Tarleton helmet, now with black or dark blue turban and white plume. By 1808 the plain jacket had acquired lacing in Hussar style (silver for officers, white for other ranks), and by ca 1819 the Tarleton helmet had been replaced by a Light Dragoon Shako with silver/white band around the top. The Barrel sash was in white and red, the Sabretache was scarlet with broad silver/white lace edging and bore an embroidered crown above a silver-plated White Rose of York.

From 1861 the regiment began a major overhaul of its uniform from Hussar style. First the lace was removed from the jacket and the sash and sabretache abandoned, before the jacket was replaced by a Lancer pattern tunic with half-plastron front in 1863. The tunic had no facings but was outlined in thin silver/white lace with simple Austrian knots on the sleeve. The light blue overalls were replaced by one in 'Oxford mixture' (blue-black) with double silver/white stripes. In 1862 the shako was replaced by a Bearskin fur cap similar to a Fusilier cap rather than a Hussar Busby, with a short white plume supported on the left side by a silver rose mounted on a gilt half-ball. In 1876 the 'Albert' pattern silver-plated/white metal Dragoon helmet with white horsehair plume replaced the fur cap, and a white waist sash with two blue lines was introduced.

When the regiment's title was changed to Queen's Own Yorkshire Dragoons in 1889 it adopted with minor variations the uniform of its affiliated Regular regiment, the Carabiniers (6th Dragoon Guards). This involved replacing the lancer tunic by one of heavy dragoon pattern in blue, with white facings, but retaining the 1876 dragoon helmet, sash etc. The regiment also obtained blue regular cavalry cloaks with white collars by about 1893–4, and officers wore a black sabretache from 1898. Full dress was supplemented by stable jackets and dark blue pillbox caps with white bands (scarlet caps for the band) for less formal orders of dress.

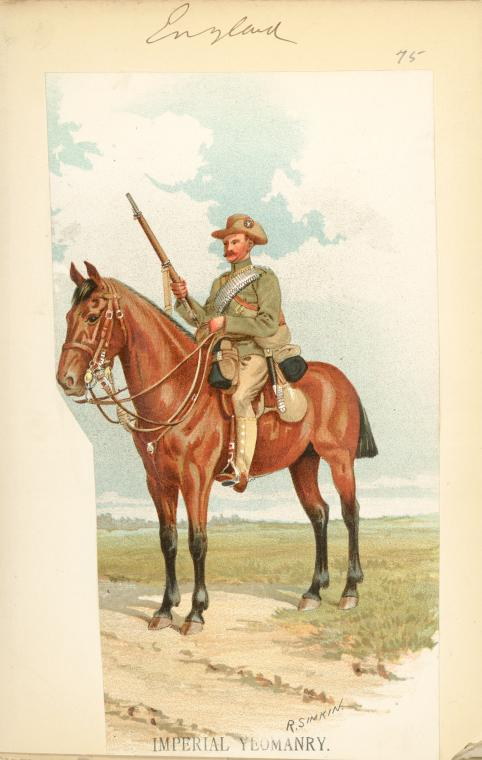
Richard Simkin's illustration of an Imperial Yeomanry trooper; the Yorkshire IY wore their slouch hats with the other side turned up.

During the Second Boer War the Imperial Yeomanry wore khaki field service dress, brown leather equipment with an ammunition Bandolier, and a Slouch hat with one side turned up (the right side for the Yorkshire IY) and a short brown turkey feather plume. This became the universal uniform for the Imperial Yeomanry regiments at home from 1901, but the regulations were later relaxed and full dress returned for ceremonial occasions. Other older items remained in use, such as the blue cavalry cloaks. When the IY were incorporated into the TF in 1908, the slouch hat was replaced by the peaked Service cap. The other ranks' shoulder straps bore brass titles with 'T' and 'Y' over a curved 'Yorkshire Dragoons'.

== Honorary colonels ==
The following served as honorary colonel of the unit:

- Col William Wentworth-Fitzwilliam, 6th Earl Fitzwilliam, KG, appointed 25 December 1886
- Maj-Gen Aldred Lumley, 10th Earl of Scarbrough, TD appointed 1 April 1908, later Director-General of the Territorial and Volunteer Forces, 1917–21
- Lt-Col Edward Wood, 3rd Viscount Halifax, KG, GCSI, GCIE, TD, appointed 20 July 1935

== Affiliations ==
When the regiment became Dragoons in 1889 it was affiliated to the 6th Dragoon Guards (Carabiniers) of the Regular Army.

In the 1930s the regiment was affiliated to 8th Princess Louise's New Brunswick Hussars, a link that is continued through the Yorkshire Yeomanry Squadron of the Queen's Own Yeomanry.

When the regiment was reformed in 1947 it was affiliated to the Regular 9th Lancers

== Battle honours ==
The Queen's Own Yorkshire Dragoons was awarded the following battle honours (honours in bold are emblazoned on the regimental standard):

Second Boer War	**South Africa 1900–02**
First World War	**Cambrai 1917**, **Courtrai**, **France and Flanders 1916–18**
Second World War	**Syria 1941**, **El Alamein**, Tebaga Gap, **El Hamma**, El Kourzia, **Tunis**, **North Africa 1942–43**, **Anzio**, **Rome**, Coriano, **Rimini Line**, **Ceriano Ridge**, **Italy 1944**

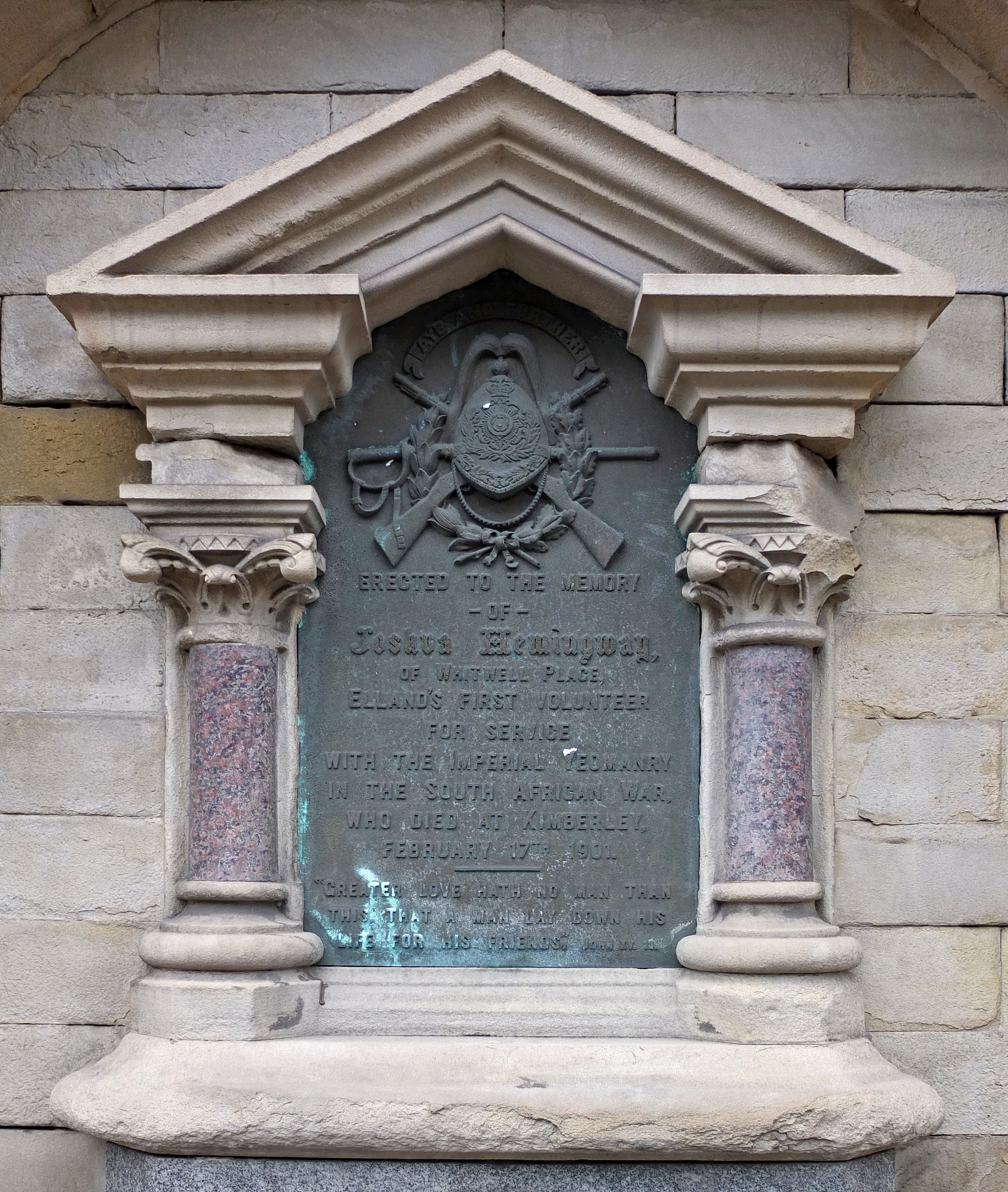
Memorial to James Hemingway in Elland.

== Memorials ==
In St George's Minster, Doncaster, there is a wall-mounted copper plaque to the dead of the Yorkshire Imperial Yeomanry in the Second Boer War, and wall-mounted stone tablets to the Queens Own Yorkshire Dragoons' dead in both world wars.

In Elland, West Yorkshire, there is an elaborate wall plaque to James Hemingway of the Imperial Yeomanry, 'Elland's First Volunteer', who died at Kimberley in 1901. The plaque includes the helmet and plate of the Queen's Own Yorkshire Dragoons.

There is a stained glass memorial window and carved inscription in the South Nave Aisle of York Minster to the regiment's dead in the First World War; the window was removed for safety in November 1939 and reinstated by the regiment in 1948 as a tribute to the regiment's dead during the Second World War.

== See also ==
- Imperial Yeomanry
- List of Yeomanry Regiments 1908
- Yeomanry
- Yeomanry order of precedence
- British yeomanry during the First World War
- Second line yeomanry regiments of the British Army

== Bibliography ==
- L. Barlow & R.J. Smith, The Uniforms of the British Yeomanry Force 1794–1914, 3: The Yorkshire Hussars, Aldershot: Robert Ogilby Trust/Tunbridge Wells: Midas Books, 1981, ISBN 0-85936-250-7.
- L. Barlow & R.J. Smith, The Uniforms of the British Yeomanry Force 1794–1914, 7: Yorkshire Dragoons, Aldershot: Robert Ogilby Trust/Tunbridge Wells: Spellmount, 1984, ISBN 0-946771-82-0.
- Becke, Major A.F. (1989) [1935]. Order of Battle of Divisions Part 1. The Regular British Divisions. London: His Majesty's Stationery Office. ISBN 1-871167-09-4.
- Burke's Peerage, Baronetage and Knightage, 100th Edn, London, 1953.
- Cooper, Jilly (1984). Animals in War. Corgi. ISBN 978-0552990912.
- Louis Creswicke, South Africa and the Transvaal War, Vol V, From the Disaster at Koorn Spruit to Lord Roberts's Entry into Pretoria.
- Col John K. Dunlop, The Development of the British Army 1899–1914, London: Methuen, 1938.
- J.B.M. Frederick, Lineage Book of British Land Forces 1660–1978, Vol I, Wakefield, Microform Academic, 1984, ISBN 1-85117-007-3.
- James, Brigadier E.A. (1978). British Regiments 1914–18. London: Samson Books Limited. ISBN 0-906304-03-2.
- N.B. Leslie, Battle Honours of the British and Indian Armies 1695–1914, London: Leo Cooper, 1970, ISBN 0-85052-004-5.
- Mileham, Patrick (1994). The Yeomanry Regiments; 200 Years of Tradition. Edinburgh: Canongate Academic. ISBN 1-898410-36-4.
- Stephen M. Miller, Lord Methuen and the British Army: Failure and Redemption in South Africa, London: Cass, 1999, ISBN 0-7146-4904-X.
- Perry, F.W. (1993). Order of Battle of Divisions Part 5B. Indian Army Divisions. Newport: Ray Westlake Military Books. ISBN 1-871167-23-X.
- Rinaldi, Richard A (2008). Order of Battle of the British Army 1914. Ravi Rikhye. ISBN 978-0-97760728-0.
- Col H.C.B. Rogers, The Mounted Troops of the British Army 1066–1945, London: Seeley Service, 1959.
- Spencer, Stanley; Wilks, Karen (2008). Stanley Spencer's Great War Diary 1915-1918. Pen and Sword Military. ISBN 978-1844157785.
- Edward M. Spiers, The Army and Society 1815–1914, London: Longmans, 1980, ISBN 0-582-48565-7.
