= Thomas Carnelley =

British chemist (1854–1890)

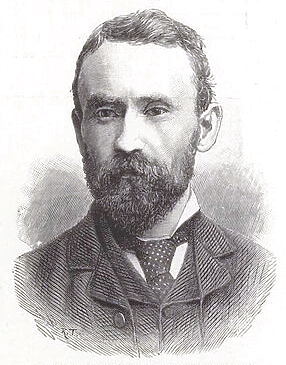

Thomas Carnelley (22 October 1854 – 27 August 1890) was a British chemist who contributed to physical chemistry and was involved in introducing German-inspired chemistry research into Britain as professor of chemistry at the University of Dundee and later at Aberdeen. He studied the relationships between the melting and boiling points of the salts of elements and their positions in the periodic table. He also examined relationships between molecular structures and physical properties and came up with a rule that is sometimes called "Carnelley's Rule".

== Life and work ==
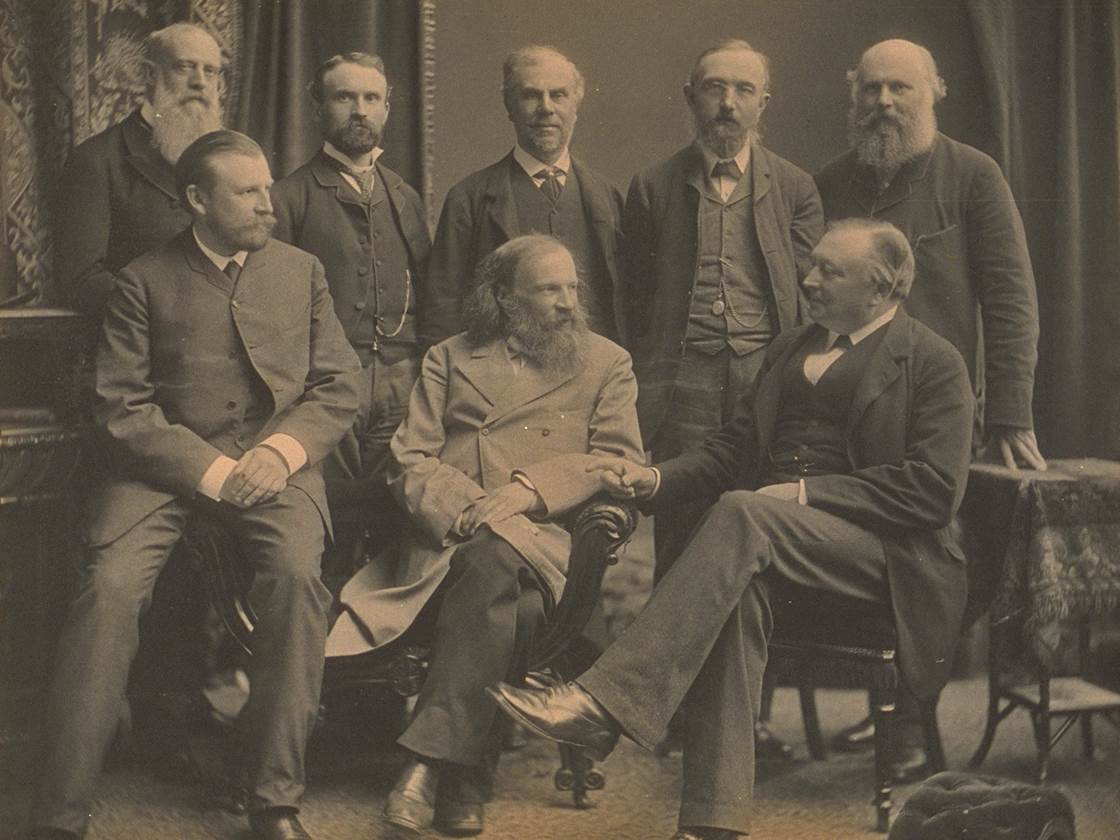
Carnelley (standing second from left), Dmitri Mendeleev (bottom, centre) and Sir Henry Roscoe (bottom, right)

Carnelley was born in Manchester, the son of William. He studied at King's College School, London and joined Owens College, Manchester in 1868. He showed scholastic brilliance and received a Bachelor of Science in 1871 with a third position in Third Class Honors in Chemistry. In 1872 he obtained second place in First Class Honors in Chemistry qualifying for a university scholarship. He studied the vanadates of thallium that led to a Dalton Chemical Scholarship and he worked as a private assistant to Henry Enfield Roscoe in 1872-74 giving lectures in the evening at Owens College. He then went to the University of Bonn and studied under August Kekulé (1829–1896), Theodor Zincke (1843–1928), and Otto Wallach (1847–1931). He studied the reactions of carbon disulfide and alcohol with hot copper catalysts and the synthesis of tolylphenyl. He received a doctorate in 1876 and in 1879 he received a DSc from the University of London. He was appointed to Firth College, Sheffield in 1879 where he established a chemistry laboratory and in 1881 he moved to the University College of Dundee where he had more resources. He taught with great zeal and was popular among students. He also conducted research on the heating and ventilation of schools, the quality of air in buildings and so on leading to his being elected to the school board. He also established a museum and a dye-house with material contributed by Carnelley's father to the college. In 1888 he accepted the chair of chemistry at the University of Aberdeen following the death of James Smith Brazier. Two years after moving to Aberdeen, he suffered from a sudden illness and an internal abscess. He died at home in Cults, Aberdeen at the age of 36.

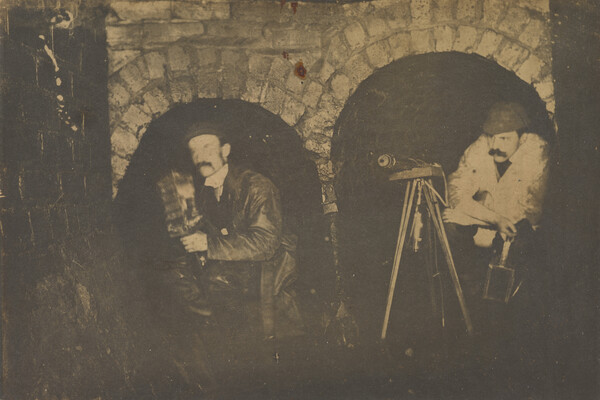
Carnelley (left) and J. S. Haldane examining the air of Dundee sewer

Carnelley helped introduce the German style of chemical research and industrial applications into Britain. He was elected to the Chemical Society of London in 1874. He published more than 50 papers and several textbooks. He studied the synthesis of several hydrocarbons including tolylphenyl and ditolyl and examined the physics of ice. In his 1879 work, he examined the melting points of metallic salts and related them to their positions in the periodic table. Mendeleeff took notice of the work and wrote to Henry Roscoe that Carnelley's work deserved wide knowledge. He stated that: “The labors of Carnelley connected with the periodic law of the elements have been so remarkable that the history of the subject would be incomplete if his name were omitted.” Carnelley and Thomas Burton developed a new pyrometer to measure high temperatures. It was made of a coil of copper tubing which carries water through it. Measurement was made of the water temperature at the inlet and at the outlet and he calibrated these with known temperatures. In 1881 he claimed that it was possible to maintain ice at solid phase at temperatures above the normal melting point under pressure. In 1880 the sublimation of ice was demonstrated at low temperatures.

Carnelley's Rule states that of two or more isomers, those whose atoms are the more symmetrically and the more compactly arranged melt higher than those in which the atomic arrangement is asymmetrical or in the form of long chains.

His interest in public hygiene led to his being appointed to a committee to examine the air and smells in the House of Commons in 1886. Carnelley and J.S. Haldane were asked to examine the quality of the air. The studied the carbon dioxide levels in the sewers and in the rooms. He also adapted a bacteriological analysis using Hesse's method.
