= Nether Hall, Doncaster =

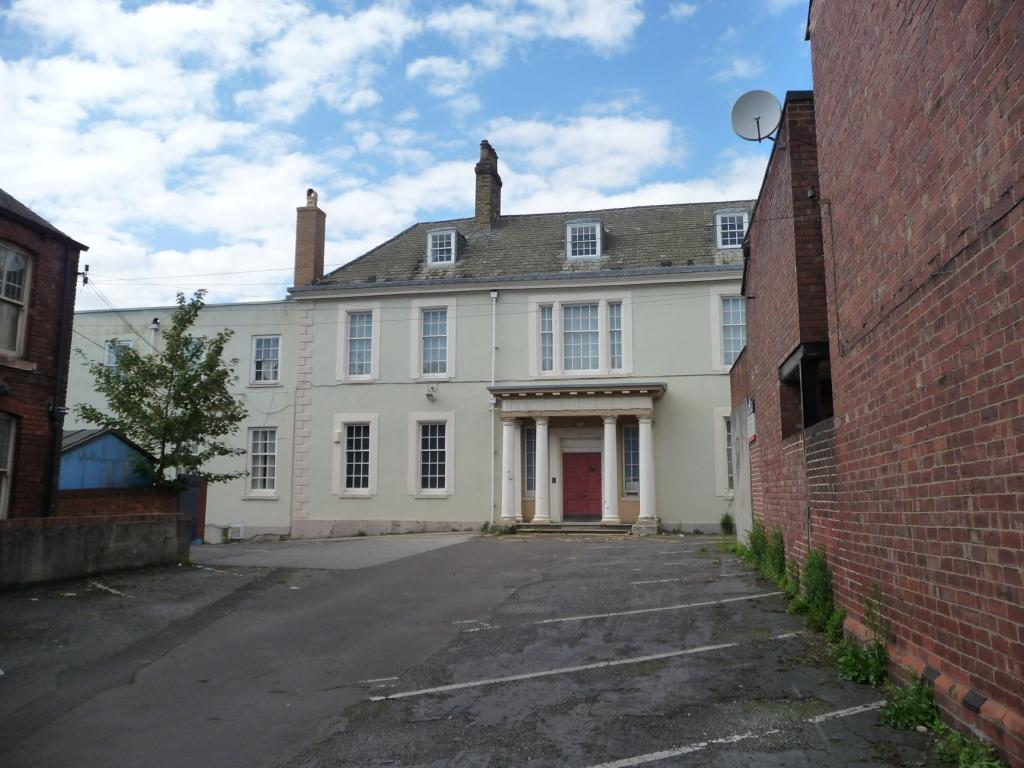
- Nether Hall, Doncaster

- Location in South Yorkshire
- 53.5257°N 1.1292°W
- Location: Doncaster, South Yorkshire, England

History
- Built: Early to mid 18th century

Listed Building – Grade II
- Designated: 18 April 1969
- Reference no.: 1192739

Nether Hall is a large mansion in Doncaster. It is a Grade II listed building.

== History ==
The building was designed as a mansion for the Copley family of Sprotbrough and was completed in the early to mid 18th century.

Sir Fitzroy Maclean, 8th Baronet sold an estate in Barbados with 150 slaves for £14,285 and purchased Nether Hall in 1841.

It became a private school in the 1870s and then became the headquarters of the Queen's Own Yorkshire Dragoons in the early 20th century. The regiment was mobilised at Nether Hall in August 1914 before being deployed to the Western Front. The hall was decommissioned after the war and acquired by Doncaster Rural District Council in 1921; a rear wing was built for use as a council chamber. Following the Local Government Act 1974 the hall was used to accommodate the finance department of the Metropolitan Borough of Doncaster. After the finance department moved to new civic offices in Sir Nigel Gresley Square in 2013, Nether Hall was sold at auction for £410,000 in 2014. The building was offered for sale by auction again, by Allsop of London, with a guide price of £425,000 or more, in September 2023.
