= Lady Anne Brewis =

English botanist (1911–2002)

Lady Anne Brewis MBE
- Born: Lady Anne Beatrice Mary Palmer; 26 March 1911
- Died: 31 March 2002 (aged 91)
- Education: Somerville College, Oxford
- Known for: The Flora of Hampshire (1996)
- Spouse: John Brewis (m. 1935; died 1972)
- Father: Roundell Cecil Palmer, 3rd Earl of Selborne
- Scientific career
- Fields: Botany

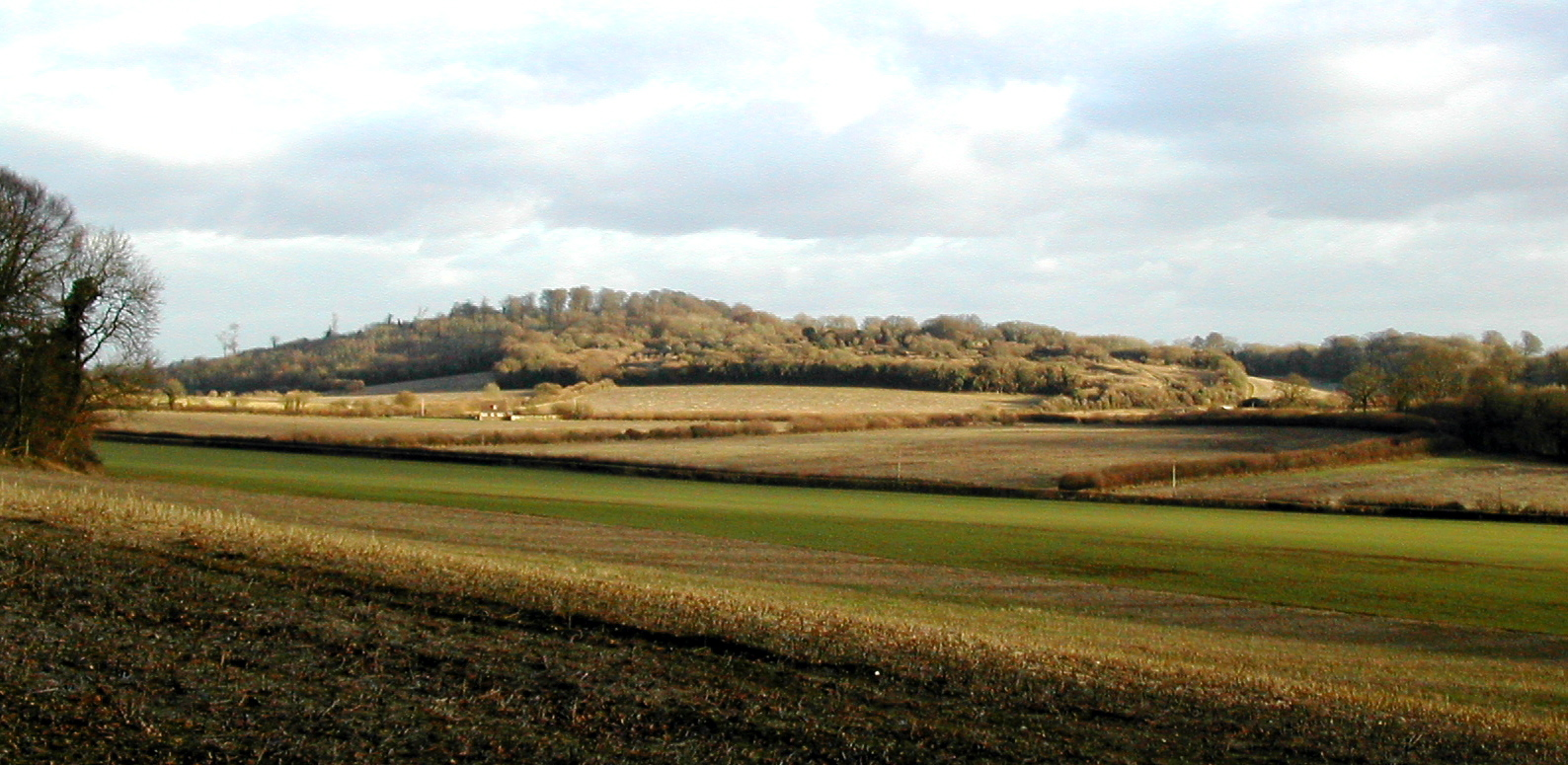
Noar Hill near Selborne in Hampshire

Anne Beatrice Mary Brewis MBE (née Lady Anne Palmer, 26 March 1911 – 31 March 2002), known as Lady Anne Brewis, was an English botanist, environmental campaigner and writer. She is best known for the book The Flora of Hampshire (1996).

== Family ==
Brewis was born as Lady Anne Beatrice Mary Palmer on 26 March 1911.

She was the daughter of the Conservative politician Roundell Palmer (then known by the courtesy title Viscount Wolmer, later the 3rd Earl of Selborne) and his wife Viscountess Wolmer (née the Hon. Grace Ridley), the third daughter of Matthew White Ridley, 1st Viscount Ridley. She had five siblings and was born just three months after her father's election as Member of Parliament for South-West Lancashire, Newton Division.

Her paternal great-grandfather, Roundell Palmer, 1st Earl of Selborne, had been a keen botanist and entomologist.

== Marriage and children ==
As a young woman, Brewis was a debutante. She married Anglican priest Rev. John Salusbury Brewis in 1935. Her marriage took her to many localities before returning to Hampshire on her husband's retirement from the clergy in 1954.

They also had four children:

- Thomas William Brewis (b. 27 Aug 1937)
- Robert Salusbury Brewis (b. 21 May 1939
- Mary Elizabeth Maud Brewis (b. 11 Apr 1947)
- Susan Amy Brewis (b. 21 Jun 1949)

She was widowed in 1972.

== Botany ==
As a child, Brewis had spent long holidays studying the orchids on Noar Hill, near Selborne in Hampshire. This led her to study the works of the naturalist Gilbert White, and eventually to a achieve degree in zoology at Somerville College, Oxford.

Over 27 years, she meticulously catalogued hundreds of species of vascular plants, and co-authored with Francis Rose and Peter Bowman the definitive guide to Hampshire's plant life, The Flora of Hampshire, published in 1996. She was a member of the Wild Flower Society and the Botanical Society of Britain and Ireland.

Brewis was also an environmental activist and spearheaded the campaign to make the British Ministry of Defence aware of the damage that training caused to flora, fauna and the wider natural environment.

In retirement, Brewis was a warden at the Noar Hill nature reserve, working for the Hampshire and Isle of Wight Wildlife Trust. Every summer, she would organise "botanical safaris" for local children.

== Awards ==
She was appointed as a Member of the Order of the British Empire (MBE) in the New Years Honours list 1999 for "services to Nature Conservation in Hampshire."

== Death ==
Shortly before her death, Brewis donated the majority of her plant collections to the Hampshire County Museum Service. Brewis died on 31 March 2002, five days after her 91st birthday.

== Bibliography ==
- The Flora of Hampshire, Bowman P, Brewis A, Mabey R, Rose F. 1996. Harley Books. ISBN 0-946589-34-8. (This 1996 book was preceded by the Flora of Hampshire, 2nd edition, 1904 by Frederick Townsend.)
- Natural History of Selborne, White G. 1789 (repr: 1977) Penguin London, ISBN 0-14-043112-8 Hampshire (1996).
