= Archdeacon of Doncaster =

Officer within the Diocese of Sheffield

The Archdeacon of Doncaster is a senior ecclesiastical officer within the Diocese of Sheffield, responsible for the disciplinary supervision of the clergy within the six area deaneries: Adwick-le-Street, Doncaster, Snaith & Hatfield, Tankersley, Wath and West Doncaster.

== History ==
The archdeaconry of Doncaster was created in the Diocese of York from parts of the York and Sheffield archdeaconries on 18 February 1913 and transferred to the Diocese of Sheffield upon its creation on 23 January 1914.

== List of archdeacons ==
- 1913–1941 (ret.): Folliott Sandford (afterwards archdeacon emeritus)

The archdeaconry has been in Sheffield diocese since 23 January 1914.

- 1941–1947 (res.): Robert Stannard (afterwards Bishop of Woolwich, 1947)
- 1947–1954 (res.): John Brewis
- 1955–1959 (res.): John Nicholson
- 1959–1967 (res.): Peter Bostock
- 1967–1979 (ret.): Evan Rogers (afterwards archdeacon emeritus)
- 1979–1985 (res.): Ian Harland (afterwards Bishop of Lancaster, 1985)
- 1985–1994 (ret.): Desmond Carnelley (afterwards archdeacon emeritus)
- 1994–2001 (ret.): Bernard Holdridge
- 2001–2011 (ret.): Bob Fitzharris (afterwards archdeacon emeritus)
- 2012 – 31 December 2019 (ret.): Steve Wilcockson
- 1 January – 16 May 2020: David Stevens (acting)
- 23 September 2020 – present: Javaid Iqbal (Acting since 16 May)
