= James Smith Brazier =

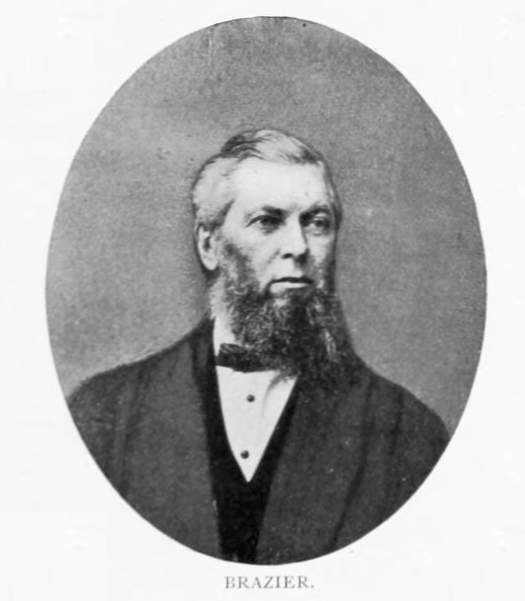

James Smith Brazier (7 March 1825 – 14 January 1889) was a British chemist and a professor at Aberdeen University where he also served as secretary for the medical faculty and later dean of the medical school.

Brazier was born in Rye, Sussex. He was raised by his maternal uncle Jeremiah Smith after the early death of his parents. Smith was a promoter of the Royal College of Chemistry and the young Brazier joined the place in 1847 after studying at King William's College in the Isle of Man living with the secretary William Johnson. From Johnson he learned the electrotype process which he later used for electrolysis. With J. E. Mayer he studied the composition of flax plants and the soil on which they were grown. He became an assistant to August Wilhelm von Hofmann in 1851. He worked at Belfast with Thomas Andrews (1813–1885) at Queen's College followed by work in Aberdeen with Thomas Clark and Andrew Fyfe. He was Fordyce lecturer from 1853. After the death of Fyfe, he was made a professor and later became chair of chemistry. He did not have a degree and an honorary doctorate was being considered when he died at the age of 64.

Brazier married a cousin and they had three sons and two daughters.
