= Robert Brewis =

English footballer

Personal information
- Full name: Robert Brewis
- Place of birth: Newcastle-upon-Tyne, England
- Position: Centre forward

Senior career*
| Years | Team | Apps | (Gls) |
| 1907–1908 | Lincoln City | 22 | (11) |
| 1908–1909 | Burnley | 2 | (0) |
- * Club domestic league appearances and goals

Robert Brewis was an English professional footballer who played as a centre forward. He was born in Newcastle-upon-Tyne and played in the Football League with Lincoln City and Burnley, scoring 11 goals in 24 matches.
