= Bob Fitzharris =

British Anglican priest (1946–2024)

The Ven Robert Aidan (Bob) Fitzharris (August 1946 – 20 August 2024) was the Archdeacon of Doncaster from 2001 to 2011.

Fitzharris was educated at St Anselm's College and the University of Sheffield. He was a dentist from 1971 to 1987. He studied for the priesthood at Lincoln Theological College; and was ordained deacon in 1989 and priest in 1990. After a curacy at Dinnington he was Vicar of Bentley from 1992 to 2001.

He died in 2024, aged 78.

Church of England titles
Preceded by Desmond Carnelley	Archdeacon of Doncaster; 2001 –2011	Succeeded by Steve Wilcockson
