= John Brewis (priest) =

English Anglican priest

The Venerable John Brewis
- Archdeacon of Doncaster
- John Brewis
- Diocese: Diocese of Sheffield
- In office: 1947 to 1954
- Predecessor: Robert Stannard
- Successor: John Nicholson
- Other post: Principal of St Chad's College, Durham (1937–1947)

Orders
- Ordination: 1928

Personal details
- Born: John Salusbury Brewis; 13 May 1902
- Died: 1 March 1972 (aged 69)
- Denomination: Anglicanism
- Spouse: Lady Anne Palmer (m. 1935)
- Children: Four
- Education: Eton College
- Alma mater: Hertford College, Oxford; Princeton University; Cuddesdon College

John Salusbury Brewis (13 May 1902 – 1 March 1972) was an English Anglican priest. He was the Principal of St Chad's College, Durham from 1937 to 1947, and the Archdeacon of Doncaster from 1947 to 1954.

== Early life and education ==
Brewis was born on 13 May 1902. He was educated at Eton College, an all-boys public school near Windsor, Berkshire. He studied modern history at Hertford College, Oxford, graduating with a first class honours Bachelor of Arts (BA) degree. He then attended Princeton University as a Henry P. Davison Scholar. He trained for Holy Orders at Cuddesdon College, an Anglo-Catholic theological college near Oxford, Oxfordshire.

== Ordained ministry ==
He was ordained in 1928. He was an Assistant Master at his old school from 1927 to 1929; Vice-Principal and Tutor of St Edmund Hall, Oxford from 1929 to 1937; Principal of St Chad's College, Durham from 1937 to 1947; Vicar of St James' Church, High Melton from 1947 to 1954 (and Rural Dean of Doncaster during the same period); and Rector of St James's Church, Piccadilly from 1954 to 1967.

== Personal life ==
In 1935, Brewis married Lady Anne Palmer. Together they had four children: two sons and two daughters. Lady Anne became a noted Botanist.

Brewis died on 1 March 1972, aged 69.

Church of England titles
Preceded by Robert William Stannard	Archdeacon of Doncaster; 1947 –1954	Succeeded by John Malcolm Nicholson
Academic offices
Preceded by Stephen Moulsdale	Principal of St Chad's College; 1937-1947	Succeeded by Theodore S. Wetherall
