= Desmond Carnelley =

Archdeacon of Doncaster (1929–2020)

The Ven. Desmond Carnelley (November 1929 – 23 December 2020) was the Archdeacon of Doncaster from 1985 to 1994.

Carnelley was educated at St John's College, York and Ripon Hall Oxford; and ordained deacon in 1960 and priest in 1961.

After a curacy in Aston (1960–63), he was Priest in charge at St Paul, Ecclesfield (1963–67). He was Vicar of Balby from 1967 to 1973; and then of Mosborough from 1973 to 1985 (and Rural Dean of Attercliffe from 1979 to 1984). For part of the period whilst being Archdeacon of Doncaster, he was Director of Education for the Diocese of Sheffield (1991–94).

He died in 2020, aged 91.

Church of England titles
Preceded by Ian Harland	Archdeacon of Doncaster; 1985–1994	Succeeded by Bernard Holdridge
