= Earl of Selborne =

Earldom in the Peerage of the United Kingdom

- Creation date: 30 December 1882
- Created by: Queen Victoria
- Peerage: Peerage of the United Kingdom
- First holder: Roundell Palmer, 1st Earl of Selborne
- Present holder: William Palmer, 5th Earl of Selborne
- Heir apparent: Alexander Palmer, Viscount Wolmer
- Remainder to: the 1st Earl's heirs male of the body lawfully begotten
- Subsidiary titles: Viscount Wolmer; Baron Selborne
- Status: Extant
- Motto: PALMA VIRTUTI (Let the palm be awarded to virtue)

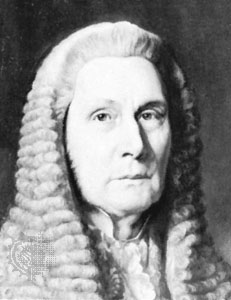
Roundell Palmer, 1st Earl of Selborne

Earl of Selborne, in the County of Southampton, is a title in the Peerage of the United Kingdom. It was created in 1882 for the lawyer and Liberal politician Roundell Palmer, 1st Baron Selborne, along with the subsidiary title of Viscount Wolmer, of Blackmoor in the County of Southampton. He had already been made Baron Selborne, of Selborne in the County of Southampton, in 1872, also in the Peerage of the United Kingdom. Both his son, the second Earl, and grandson, the third Earl, were prominent Liberal Unionist politicians. The latter was in 1941 called to the House of Lords through a writ of acceleration in his father's barony of Selborne. The third Earl's grandson, the fourth Earl, served as one of the ninety elected hereditary peers that remain in the House of Lords after the passing of the House of Lords Act 1999, and sat as a Conservative. As of 2021, the titles are held by the latter's son, the fifth earl, who succeeded his father in that year.

The family seat is Temple Manor, near Selborne, Hampshire.

== Barons Selborne (1872) ==
- Roundell Palmer, 1st Baron Selborne (1812–1895) (created Earl of Selborne in 1882)

== Earls of Selborne (1882) ==
- Roundell Palmer, 1st Earl of Selborne (1812–1895)
- William Waldegrave Palmer, 2nd Earl of Selborne (1859–1942)
- Roundell Cecil Palmer, 3rd Earl of Selborne (1887–1971)
  - William Matthew Palmer, Viscount Wolmer (1912–1942).
- John Roundell Palmer, 4th Earl of Selborne (1940–2021)
- William Lewis Palmer, 5th Earl of Selborne (born 1971)

== Present peer ==
William Lewis Palmer, 5th Earl of Selborne (born 1 September 1971) is the eldest of the three sons of the 4th Earl and his wife Joanna Van Antwerp James. Styled formally as Viscount Wolmer from birth, he was educated at Eton College, Christ Church, Oxford, and the Institute of Development Studies at Sussex University. He succeeded to the peerages on 12 February 2021.

The heir apparent is his elder son, Alexander David Roundell Palmer, Viscount Wolmer (born 2002). Selborne also has a second son, Thomas, born in 2004, and a daughter, Lady Anna Palmer, born in 2006.

== Arms ==
Coat of arms of Palmer, Earls of Selborne
Crest A mount vert, thereon a greyhound sejant sable, collared or, charged on the shoulder with a trefoil slipped argent. Escutcheon Argent, two bars sable, charged with three trefoils slipped of the field; in chief a greyhound courant of the second, collared or. Supporters On either side a greyhound sable, collared or, and charged on the shoulder with a trefoil slipped argent. Motto Palma Virtuti (The palm is for virtue)

== See also ==
- Ralph Palmer, 12th Baron Lucas
