= Edwardstone =

Village in Suffolk, England

Coordinates: 52.044°N 0.833°E

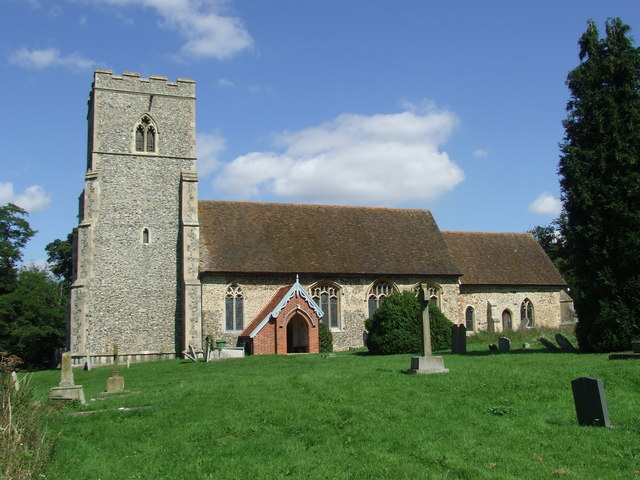
- St Mary's Church

- Location within Suffolk
- Area: 7.555 km^{2} (2.917 sq mi)
- Population: 375 (2021 census)
  - Density: 50/km^{2} (130/sq mi)
- Civil parish: Edwardstone
- District: Babergh
- Shire county: Suffolk
- Region: East
- Country: England
- Sovereign state: United Kingdom
- Post town: Sudbury
- Postcode district: CO10
- Police: Suffolk
- Fire: Suffolk
- Ambulance: East of England
- UK Parliament: South Suffolk

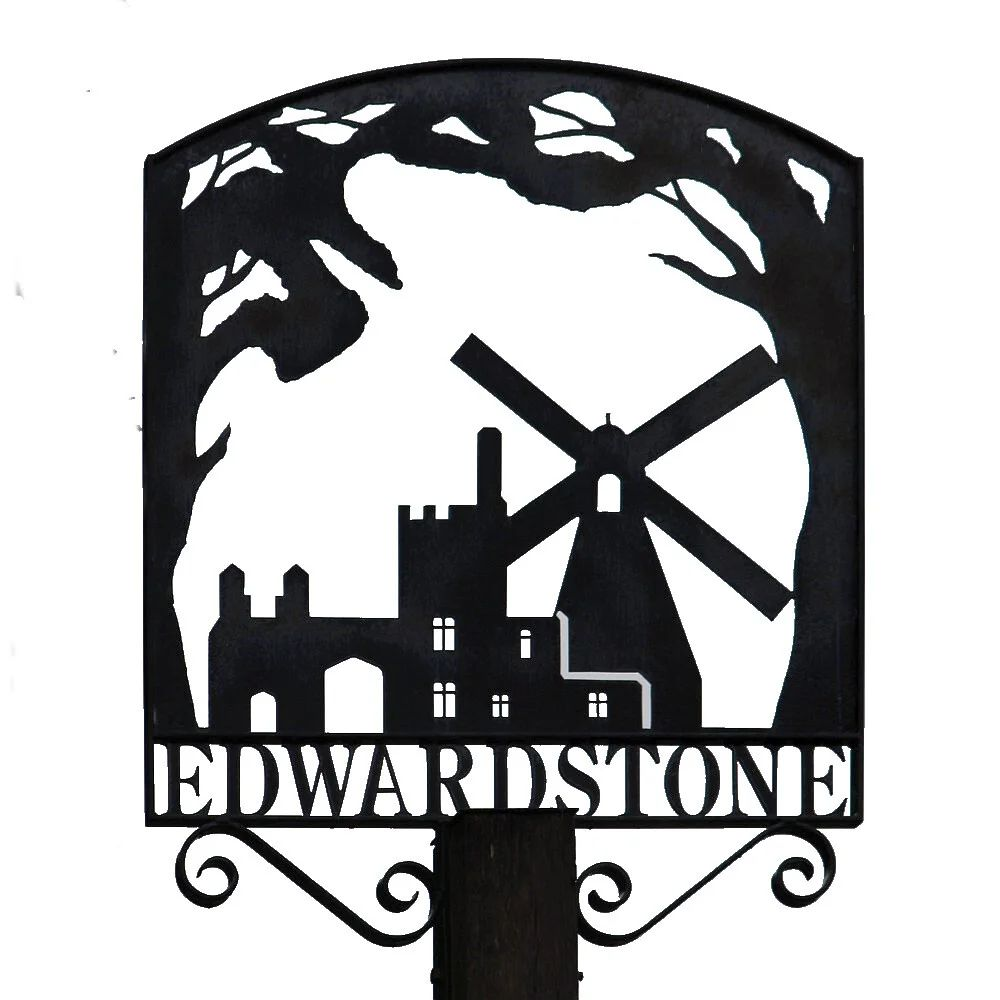
Edwardstone Village Sign

Edwardstone /ˈɛdwərdstən/ is a village and civil parish in the Babergh district, in the county of Suffolk, England. The parish contains the hamlets of Mill Green, Priory Green, Round Maple and Sherbourne Street. In 2021 the parish had a population of 375. The parish borders Boxford, Great Waldingfield, Groton, Little Waldingfield, Milden and Newton. Edwardstone has a church called St Mary's Church. There are 32 listed buildings in Edwardstone. The parish contains the Edwardstone Woods, a Site of Special Scientific Interest and Bulls Cross Wood, part of the Milden Thicks SSSI. Langley Wood, in Round Maple and Sherbourne House Meadows are County Wildlife Sites.

== History ==
The name "Edwardstone" means 'Eadweard's farm/settlement'. Edwardstone was listed in the Domesday Book of 1086 as Eduardestuna. Edwardstone Priory was a priory in Priory Green and was founded by Peter, Bishop of Winchester during the reign of King John; the priory was a cell to Abingdon monastery, before the monks resident were moved to Colne Priory. The priory may be the origin of the place name "Priory Green".

The village was the birthplace of John Winthrop, one of the founders of the Massachusetts Bay Colony.

Edwardstone was in the Babergh hundred, in 1894 it became part of Cosford Rural District which became part of the administrative county of West Suffolk in 1889. In 1974 it became part of Babergh non-metropolitan district in the non-metropolitan county of Suffolk.

In 1960 the village school closed. Edwardstone House School, an independent school, closed on 31 August 1993.

=== Historical writings ===
In 1870–72, John Marius Wilson's Imperial Gazetteer of England and Wales described the village as:

EDWARDSTONE, a parish in Cosford district, Suffolk; on an affluent of the river Stour, 4½ miles E of Sudbury r. station, and 5½ W of Hadleigh. Post town, Waldingfield, under Sudbury. Acres, 1,872. Real property, £3, 851. Pop., 462. Houses, 103. The manor belongs to the Bishop of Ely. A cell to Abingdon abbey was founded here, in 1114, by the Munchenses; and given, in 1160, to Colne priory. The living is a vicarage in the diocese of Ely. Value, £203.* Patron, Hon. H. Corry. The church has an ancient brass; and there are an Independent chapel, and charities £45.

In 1887, John Bartholomew also wrote an entry on Edwardstone in the Gazetteer of the British Isles with a much shorter description:

Edwardstone, par., W. Suffolk, 4½ miles E. of Sudbury sta., 1872 ac., pop. 438; contains E. Hall.

== Notable residents ==
- Joseph Brand (MP), (1605–1674), merchant, landowner, Member of Parliament for Sudbury in 1660
- Thomas Browne, (1889–1978), Archdeacon of Ipswich from 1946 until 1963 and honorary canon at St Edmundsbury Cathedral from 1936 to 1946.
- John Hoskyns (1927–2014), Policy Advisor to Margaret Thatcher while head of the Prime Minister's Policy Unit from May 1979 and April 1982.
- Henry Lowry-Corry (1845–1927), Colonel in the British Army, Conservative politician, and Member of Parliament (MP) for County Tyrone 1873–1880.
- William Ward, 1st Earl of Dudley (1817–1885), landowner and benefactor.
- John Winthrop, (1587/88–1649), Puritan lawyer and one of the leading figures in founding the Massachusetts Bay Colony.
