= Peter Hartley =

Peter Hartley may refer to:

- Peter Hartley (cricketer) (born 1960), English first-class cricketer and umpire
- Peter Hartley (footballer) (born 1988), English footballer
- Peter Hartley (priest) (1909–1994), Archdeacon of Suffolk
