= Gosney =

Gosney is a surname. Notable people with the surname include:

- Andy Gosney (born 1963), English footballer
- Barrie Gosney (1926–2008), English actor
- E. S. Gosney (1855–1942), American philanthropist and eugenicist
- Harold Gosney (born 1937), British artist and sculptor
- Jeanette Gosney (born 1958), British Anglican priest
- Kerrie Gosney (born 1976), British television presenter
- Joe Gosney (Born 1990), British musician
