= Cransford Meadow =

Protected area in Suffolk, England

Coordinates: 52.225°N 1.398°E

- Site of Special Scientific Interest
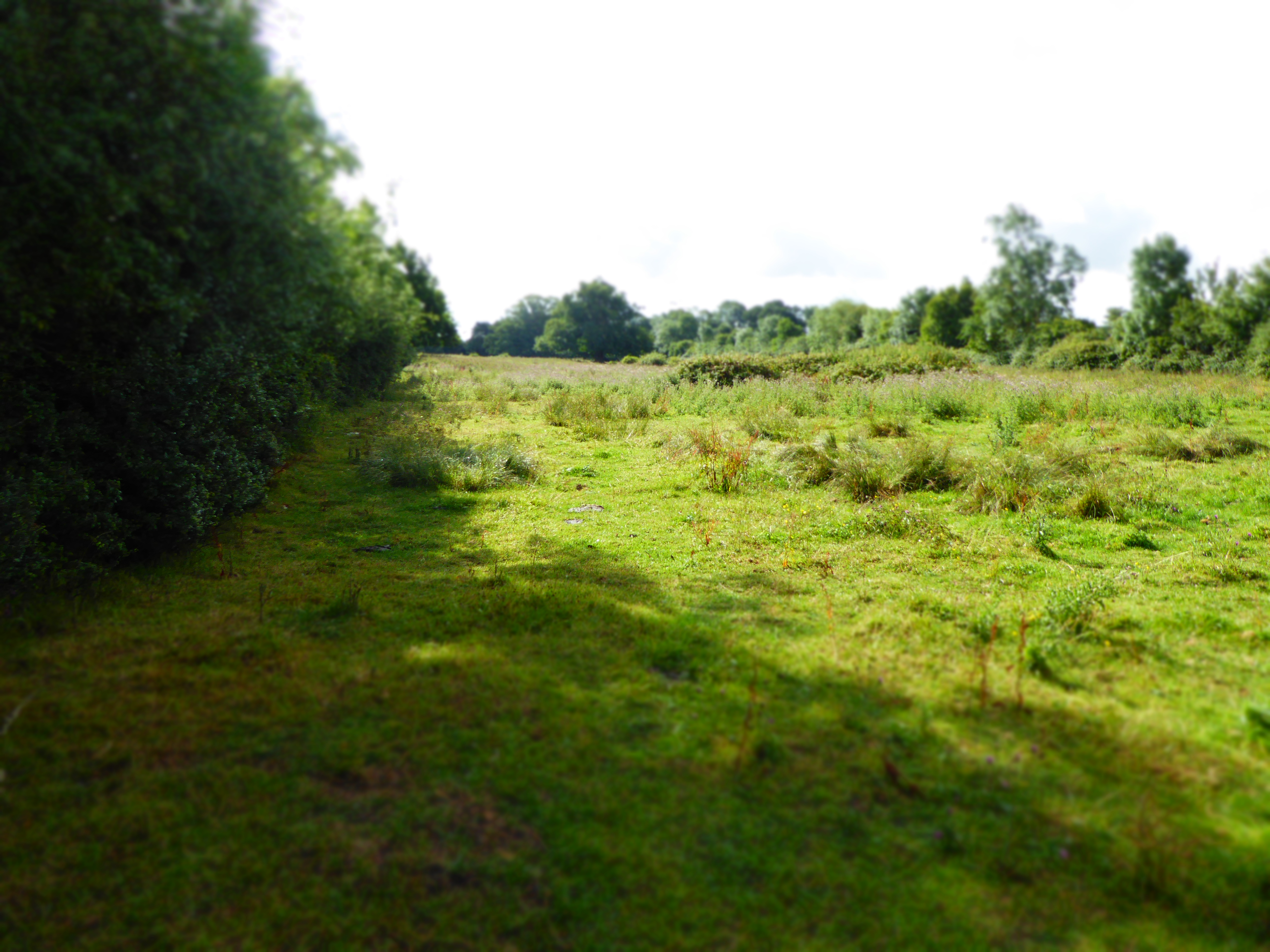
- Location of Cransford Meadow.
- Area of search: Suffolk
- Grid reference: TM 322 640
- Interest: Biological
- Area: 4.6 hectares
- Notification date: 1985
- Location map: Magic Map

Cransford Meadow is a 4.6-hectare (11-acre) biological Site of Special Scientific Interest south of Cransford in Suffolk.

This unimproved grassland site has a rich variety of flora. There are grasses such as creeping bent, meadow foxtail, sweet vernal-grass, crested dog's tail, perennial rye-grass and rough-stalked meadow-grass. It is one of only two sites in the county for ladies mantle Alchemilla filicaulis vestita.

The site is private land with no public access.
