= Ian Morgan (priest) =

Archdeacon of Suffolk

Ian David John Morgan (6 January 1957 – 3 October 2019) was Archdeacon of Suffolk from 2012 to 2019.

Morgan was born in Hereford. He was educated at Wallingford School, the University of Hull and Ripon College Cuddesdon. He was ordained deacon in 1983; and priest in 1984. After curacies in Hereford and Shoreham by Sea he was with BBC Local radio from 1988 to 1992. He held incumbencies in Ipswich from 1988 to 2012; and was Rural Dean of Ipswich from 2008 to 2012. After a long period of ill health he died in post on 3 October 2019 aged 62.

Church of England titles
Preceded by Judy Hunt	Archdeacon of Suffolk; 2012–2019	Succeeded by Jeanette Gosney
