= St Alkmund's Church, Whitchurch =

Coordinates: 52.9708°N 2.6849°W

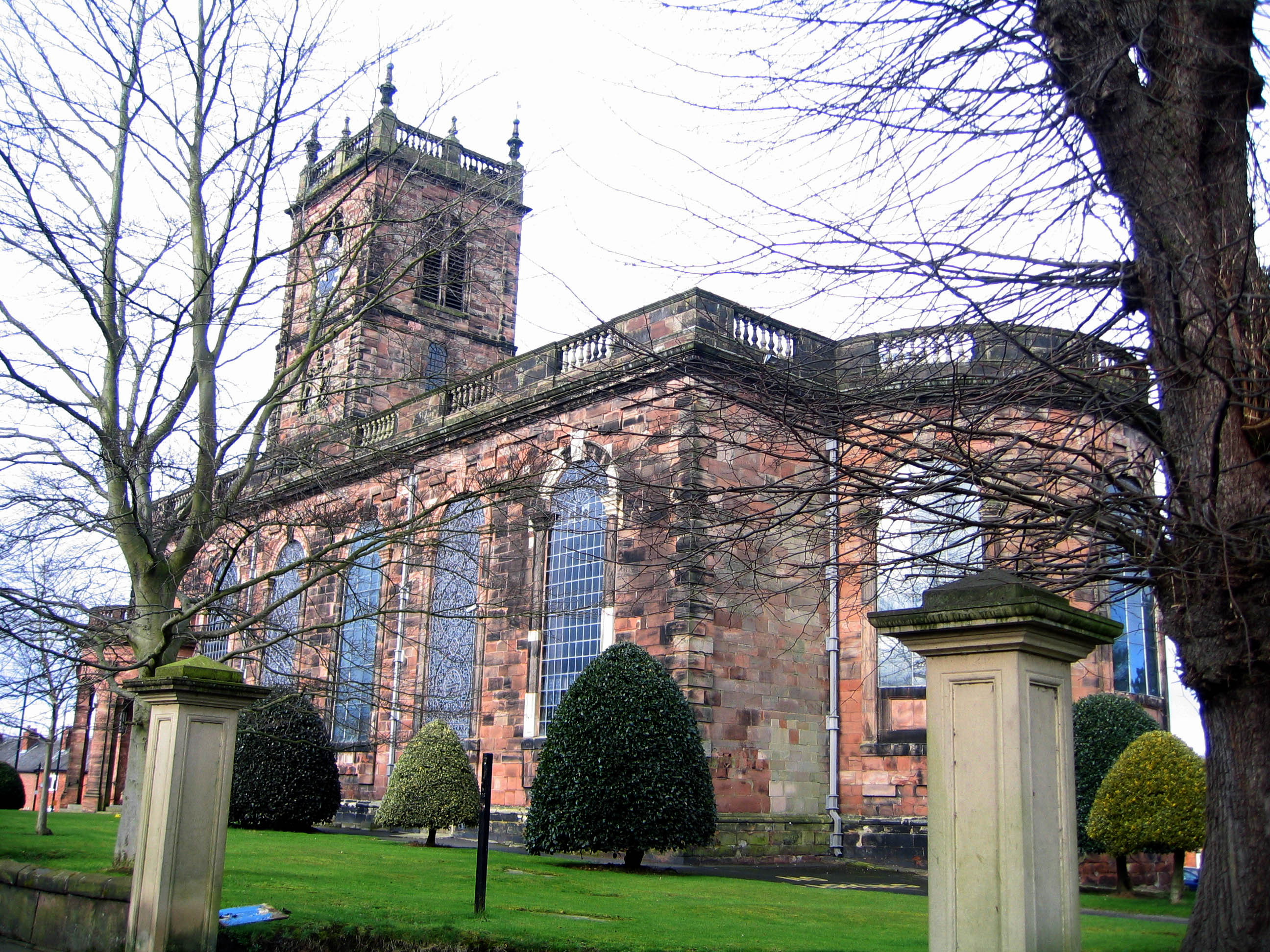
- St Alkmund's Church, Whitchurch, from the southeast

- Location in Shropshire
- OS grid reference: SJ 541 417
- Location: Whitchurch, Shropshire
- Country: England
- Denomination: Anglican
- Website: St Alkmund, Whitchurch

History
- Status: Parish church
- Dedication: Alcmund of Derby
- Consecrated: 1712

Architecture
- Functional status: Active
- Heritage designation: Grade I
- Designated: 1 May 1951
- Architectural type: Church
- Style: Neoclassical
- Groundbreaking: 1712
- Completed: 1713
- Construction cost: £4,000

Specifications
- Materials: Sandstone, slate roof

Administration
- Province: Canterbury
- Diocese: Lichfield
- Archdeaconry: Salop
- Deanery: Wem and Whitchurch
- Parish: Whitchurch

Clergy
- Rector: Revd Canon Judy Hunt

St Alkmund's Church is an active Anglican parish church in Whitchurch, Shropshire, England. By tradition, this church was founded in the 900s CE by the Anglo-Saxon Queen Æthelflæd ('Lady of the Mercians' and daughter of Alfred the Great). Certain sources suggest that the saint to whom it is dedicated, St Alkmund, (the son of Alhred, King of Northumbria (d. c. 800), was first buried in Whitchurch.

It is in the diocese of Lichfield, the archdeaconry of Salop and the deanery of Wem and Whitchurch.

The church is recorded in the National Heritage List for England which has designated it a Grade I listed building.

It stands at an elevated position in the centre of the town.

== History ==
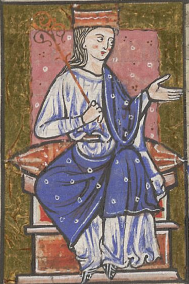
Queen Æthelflæd, Lady of the Mercians: traditionally held to be the founder of the church

The accepted date of the foundation of the church, named for Alcmund of Derby, is 912, by tradition by Queen Æthelflæd, who is understood to have translated the relics of St Alcmund to Shrewsbury around the same time.

The earliest textual record of a church on the site is 1089. This church was built in white stone, giving the name to the town. In 1296, the first rector of the church was instituted. In 1403 following his death at the Battle of Shrewsbury, Sir Henry Percy (Hotspur) was temporarily buried in the church.

Towards the end of the 15th century the body of John Talbot, 1st Earl of Shrewsbury, who had been killed at the Battle of Castillon in 1453, was removed to the church. His embalmed heart was buried under the porch and his bones lie under his effigy in the Lady Chapel.

On 31 July 1711, the central tower of the medieval church, which dated from the 15th century, collapsed and the church had to be completely rebuilt. The foundation stone was laid on 27 March 1712 and the new church was consecrated on 8 October 1712. It was built by mason William Smith of Tettenhall to the designs of John Barker (1668–1727) of Rowsley.

The church was restored in 1877–79 and again in 1885–86. Further internal alterations were made in 1894 when the organ was moved from the west gallery to its present position on the north of the chancel. At this time the organ was almost completely overhauled and rebuilt.

In 1900–02, the brick internal walls were refaced with stone and the apse was redecorated. The porch was rebuilt in 1925.

The north and south galleries were removed in 1972.

== Architecture ==
=== Exterior ===
The church is built in red sandstone ashlar with some details in grey sandstone ashlar and it has a slate roof. It is in neoclassical style. The plan consists of a six-bay nave with north and south aisles, a three-bay apsidal chancel, a south porch and an integral west tower. The organ occupies the east end of the north aisle and at the east end of the south aisle is a Lady Chapel. The windows are tall and round-arched with small glass panes in cast-iron frames. The original glass was clear and in some of the windows this has been replaced with 19th-century stained glass. The south porch is surmounted by a balustrade and approached by two stone steps. Above and to left of the porch is an inscribed sundial on the wall with a wrought-iron gnomon. The tower is in four stages. On the west side of the first stage is a tall round-arched small-paned cast-iron window. In the second stage are oculi. In the south side of the third stage is a carved stone coat of arms and on the other sides are paired round-arched niches. The fourth stage has round-headed belfry openings and on the north and south sides are clock faces dated 1977. The clock mechanism was made by JB Joyce & Co of Whitchurch. The top of the tower is surmounted by a balustrade with large urn corner finials with weather vanes, and smaller intermediate finials. A stone gutter runs around the body of the church at the base of the walls.

=== Interior ===
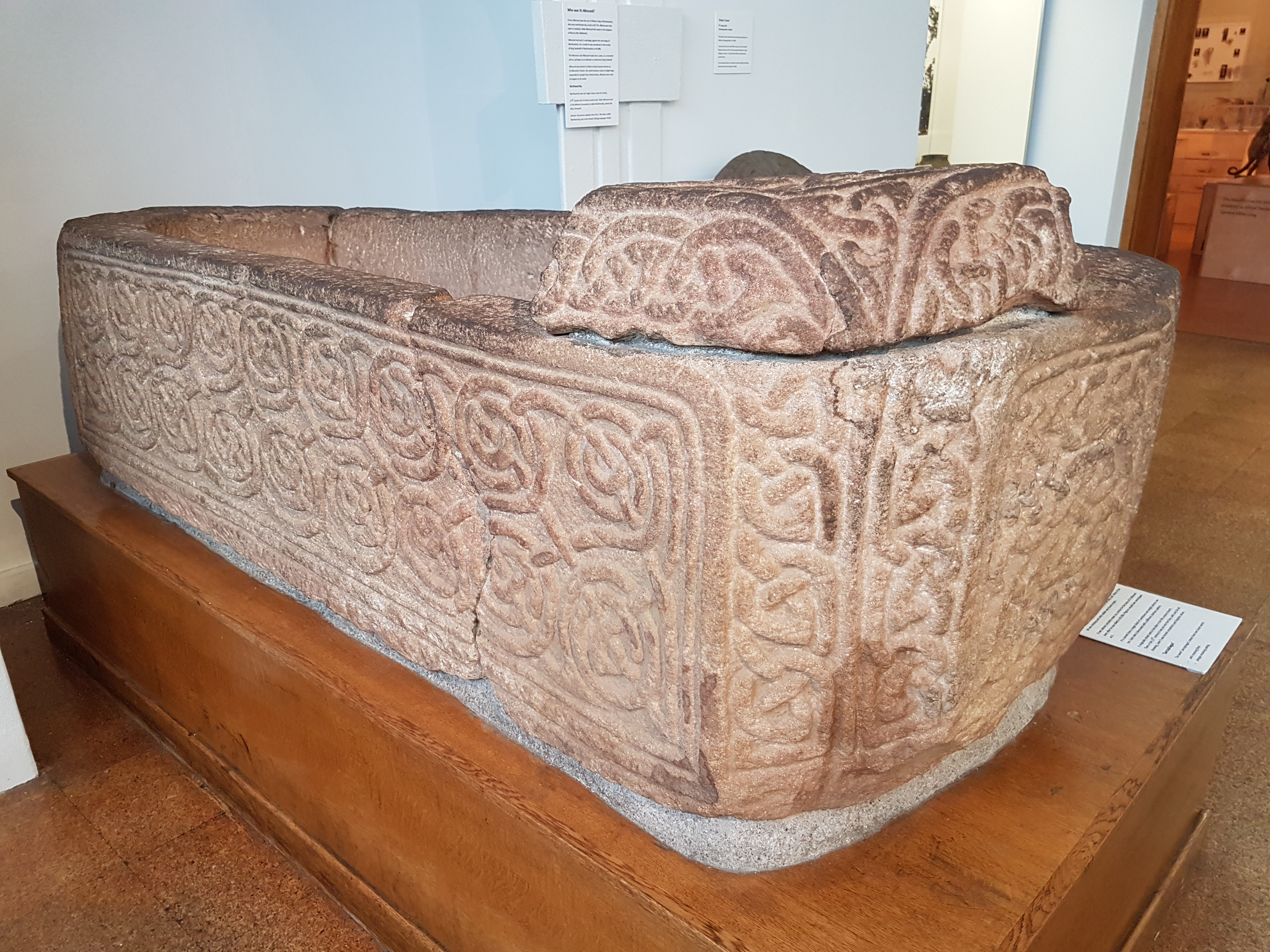
St Alkmund's sarcophagus, now at Derby Museum and Art Gallery: it is possible this saint was first buried at this church

The aisles are divided from the nave by an arcade of Tuscan columns and round arches. At the west end is a gallery which is supported by a pair of unfluted wooden Doric columns. Below the gallery is a triptych form war memorial to parish men who died serving in World War I, with mosaic of St Michael in the centre panel, dedicated by the parents of Lieutenant Thomas Chesters Bowler who is among those listed on the outer panels. The ground floor of the tower is used as a vestry. At the east end of the south aisle is the Lady Chapel which is entered through an oak screen. In the chapel is a Jacobean communion table with a 19th-century marble top. The 19th-century red sandstone reredos has carved panels and painted inscriptions. Above this is a painting of the Last Supper which has been attributed to Bonifazio Veronese. In the south wall of the chapel is the chest tomb of John Talbot, 1st Earl of Shrewsbury. It consists of a recumbent 15th-century praying effigy with dogs at its feet and a 19th-century tomb chest and arch. High on the east wall of the chapel is the coat of arms of Queen Anne. At the east end of the north aisle in the north wall is the chest tomb to Sir John Talbot, founder of the grammar school who died in 1550. It consists of a 16th-century alabaster effigy of a praying knight with a 19th-century tomb chest and arch. Under the gallery is a red and yellow sandstone font dated 1661 with a wooden cover and a hexagonal table made from the sounding board of the former 18th-century pulpit. On the north aisle wall are two boards containing the Ten Commandments. In the nave is an 18th-century brass chandelier. In the chancel is a painted and gilded altar. Around it is a three-sided framework with figures on the tops of posts. The choirstalls are dated 1885. The carved wooden eagle lectern and the hexagonal carved wooden pulpit date from the 19th century. Amongst the memorials is a brass plaque to the memory of the composer Edward German. A window in the north aisle contains fragments of medieval glass. The stained glass in the apse depicts the Ascension between images of St Peter and St Paul. It was made by Warrington in 1860. In the south aisle is a window dated 1868 with glass by Ward and Hughes. The three-manual pipe organ results from a rebuilding of an earlier organ by Peter Conacher in 1894. It was restored and altered in 1966 by Hill, Norman & Beard. There is a ring of eight bells, seven of which were cast by Rudhall of Gloucester, five in 1714 and two in 1767; the other bell is by John Taylor & Co and is dated 1842.

== External features ==
In the churchyard is a chest tomb dated 1815 in grey sandstone ashlar to the memory of Ann Loveit. It is listed at Grade II. In addition, in the churchyard, is a sundial consisting of a vase-shaped column on three steps. It carries a circular plate inscribed with Roman numerals, and a triangular gnomon. The sundial is listed at Grade II. There is also a war grave of a Royal Field Artillery soldier of World War I.

== Burials ==
- John Talbot, 1st Earl of Shrewsbury
- John Talbot, 1st Viscount Lisle
- Nicholas Bernard
- Philip Henry

== Rectors ==
This list is incomplete. You can help by expanding it.

- 1600–1661 Nicholas Bernard, previously Dean of Ardagh
- 1723–1746 Hon. Henry Egerton, also Bishop of Hereford
- 1775–1803 Rev. Richard de Courcy
- 1797–1829 Francis Egerton, 8th Earl of Bridgewater
- 1846–1908 Revd William Henry Egerton
- 2012–2023 Canon Judy Hunt, previously Archdeacon of Suffolk
- 2024–present Revd Christopher Precious (with Curate Revd Philippa White)

== Present day ==
Anglican services are held in the church on Sundays and some weekdays.

== See also ==
- Grade I listed churches in Shropshire
- Listed buildings in Whitchurch Urban
