= Neil Robinson =

Neil Robinson may refer to:

== Sports ==
- Neil Robinson (baseball) (1908–1983), American baseball player
- Neil Robinson (footballer, born 1957) (1957–2002), English football player for Everton and Grimsby Town
- Neil Robinson (motorcyclist) (1962–1986), Irish motorcycle racer
- Neil Robinson (footballer, born 1979), English football player for Macclesfield
- Neil Robinson (table tennis), Great Britain table tennis player

== Others ==
- Neil Robinson (priest) (1929–2009), Archdeacon of Suffolk
- Neil Robinson (actor) (1935–1997), English actor in The Wringer
