= Charles Hooper =

Charles Hooper may refer to:

- Charles Hooper (rugby union) (1869–1950), English rugby union player
- Charles Hooper (priest) (1911–1995), Church of England archdeacon of Ipswich
- Charles W. Hooper (born 1957), United States Army general
