= Thomas Ormerod =

British academic and churchman (1810–1874)

Thomas Johnson Ormerod (b. Great Missenden 18 May 1810 – d. Redenhall 2 December 1874) was an English academic and churchman, Archdeacon of Suffolk from 1846 to 1868.

Ormerod was educated at Brasenose College, Oxford, matriculating in 1826 and graduating B.A. in 1830. He was a Lecturer in Hebrew and Divinity at Oxford University until his appointment as Rector of Redenhall in 1847.

Church of England titles
Preceded by Henry Berners	Archdeacon of Suffolk; 1846–1868	Succeeded by Vincent Ryan
