= Geoffrey Arrand =

British Anglican priest (1944–2026)

Geoffrey William Arrand (24 July 1944 – 30 July 2026) was a British Anglican priest who was Archdeacon of Suffolk from 1994 to 2009.

Arrand was educated at King's College London and ordained in 1968. After curacies in Washington and South Ormsby he was Vicar of Great Grimsby from 1973 to 1979; Team Rector of Halesworth from 1979 to 1985; Dean of Bocking from 1985 to 1994; and Rural Dean of Hadleigh from 1986 to 1994.

Arrand retired to Lincoln in 2009, where he died on 30 July 2026 aged 82.

Church of England titles
Preceded by Neil Robinson	Archdeacon of Suffolk; 1994–2009	Succeeded by Judy Hunt
