= Cransford =

Village and civil parish in Suffolk, England

Coordinates: 52.230355°N 1.395944°E

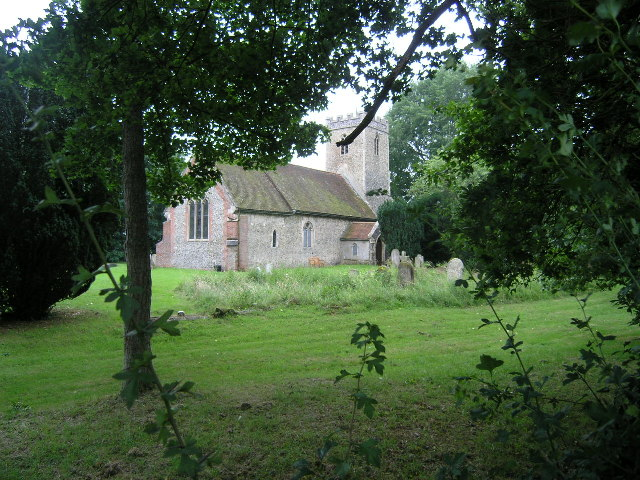
- St Peter's parish church

- Location within Suffolk
- Population: 162 (2011 census)
- Civil parish: Cransford
- District: East Suffolk
- Shire county: Suffolk
- Region: East
- Country: England
- Sovereign state: United Kingdom

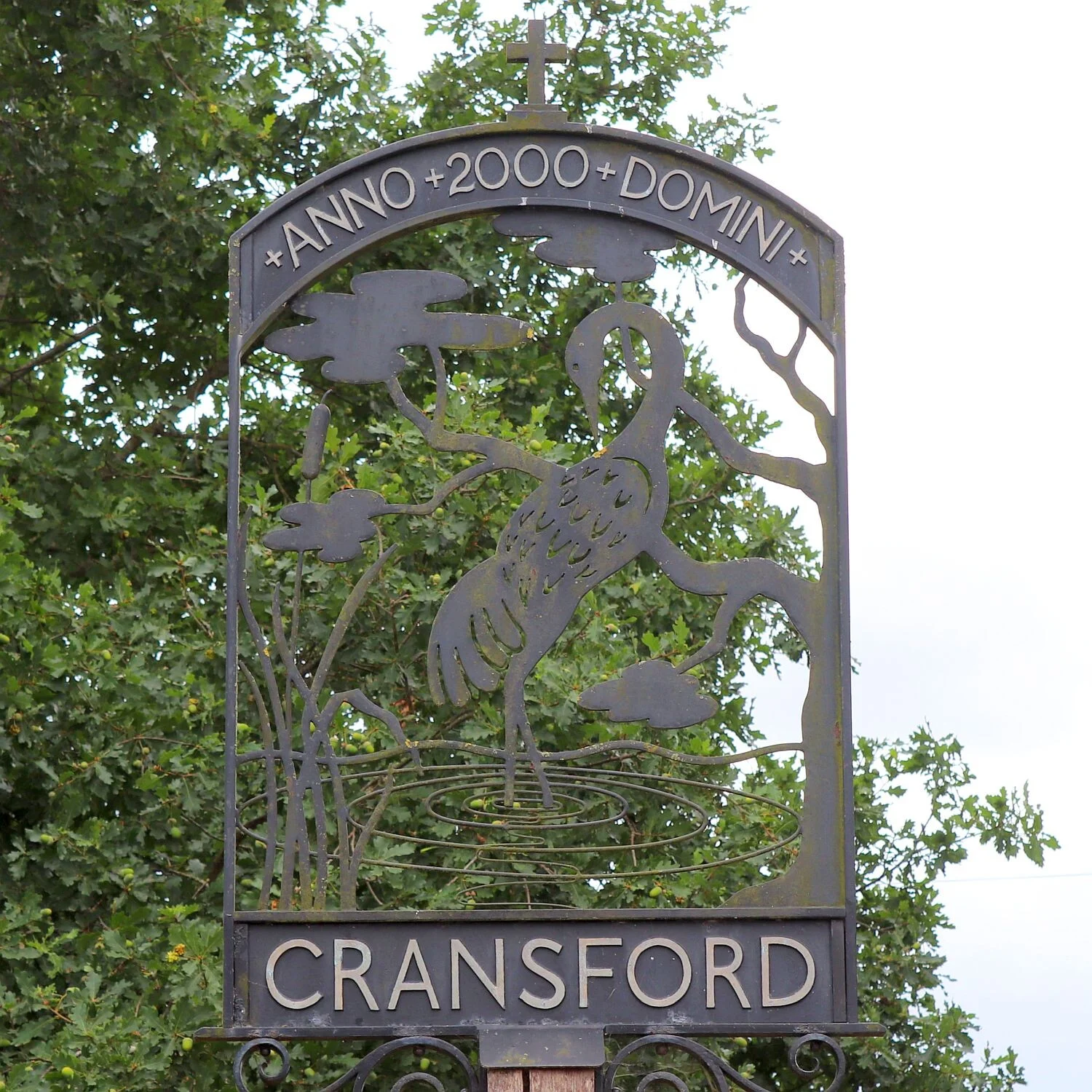
Cransford Village Sign

Cransford is a village and a civil parish in the East Suffolk district, in the English county of Suffolk. The civil parish had a population at the 2011 census of 162.

It is near the small town of Framlingham.

Cransford has two places of worship. The mediaeval parish church of St Peter was restored in 1864 and 1874 and is a Grade II* listed building.

== Notable residents ==
- Sir George Hamilton, 1st Baronet (1877–1947), electrical engineer and Conservative Party politician including Member of Parliament for Altrincham and for Ilford.
- Peter Hartley (1909–1994), clergyman and Archdeacon of Suffolk from 1970 to 1975.
- Sir George Leman Tuthill (1772–1835), physician, fellow of the Royal Society and the Royal College of Physicians.
