= Listed buildings in Whitchurch Urban =

Whitchurch Urban is a civil parish in Shropshire, England. It contains 110 listed buildings that are recorded in the National Heritage List for England. Of these, one is listed at Grade I, the highest of the three grades, seven are at Grade II*, the middle grade, and the others are at Grade II, the lowest grade. The parish contains the market town of Whitchurch and areas to the north, west and east of the town. Most of the listed buildings are in the town, and a high proportion are houses, shops, and public houses, the earliest of which are timber framed or have a timber framed core. The other listed buildings in the town include churches, items in a churchyard, a country house, almshouses, a bank, offices, schools, hotels, a drinking fountain, and a war memorial. Outside the town are farmhouses, a boundary stone, a milestone, and a road bridge. The Llangollen Canal runs through the western part of the parish, and the listed buildings associated with it are a lock keeper's cottage and a lift bridge.

== Key ==
Grade	Criteria
I	Buildings of exceptional interest, sometimes considered to be internationally important
II*	Particularly important buildings of more than special interest
II	Buildings of national importance and special interest

== Buildings ==
Name and location	Photograph	Date	Notes	Grade
Old Eagles Public House; 52.96807°N 2.68353°W		14th century (probable)	A house, later a public house, it was remodelled in the 19th century. It is timber framed with cruck construction, partly rebuilt in painted brick with a dentilled eaves cornice, and with a slate roof. There are two storeys and two bays. The doorway has Tuscan pilasters and an entablature, and the windows are sashes. Inside is the base-cruck of an open hall house.	II*
6 and 8 Bargates; 52.97051°N 2.68537°W	—	Mid to late 15th century	A house, later used for other purposes, it is timber framed with plastered infill, pebbledashed at the front, partly rebuilt in red brick at the rear, and with a tile roof. The building has two storeys and an attic, it is at right angles to the street, and has four or five bays and a single-storey rear wing. The upper storey and the attic at the gable end are slightly jettied with moulded bressumers, under which is a square oriel window with a frieze and a cornice. In the ground floor is a 19th-century shop front with cast iron columns, plate glass windows, a doorway on the corner, and a deep fascia, and the left return contains a segmental-headed sash window.	II
The Old Shop; 52.96953°N 2.68401°W		Late 15th century	A house, later a shop and cafe, the older part being the gabled cross-wing to the left, with the two-bay hall range on the right dating from about 1600. The building is timber framed with plastered infill on a rendered plinth, with a tile roof. There are two storeys, and the cross-wing also has an attic. The upper storey of the cross-wing is jettied with a moulded bressumer, and the gable is also jettied. In the ground floor of the hall range is an elaborate 19th-century shop front with a deep glass fascia. The ground floor of the cross-wing contains a central doorway with a four-part fanlight, flanked by small-paned windows, and the windows elsewhere are casements.	II*
8 and 10 Dodington; 52.96752°N 2.68248°W	—	15th or 16th century	A house, later divided into two dwellings, it is timber framed with cruck construction, with painted brick infill, rendered on the front and painted to resemble timber framing, and with a slate roof. There are two storeys and three bays, and exposed timber framing on the right gable end. The windows are small-paned casements, and No. 8 has a gabled porch. Inside there is a full cruck truss in the left wall.	II
23 and 25 Dodington; 52.96633°N 2.68146°W	—	Early to mid 16th century	A house, later divided into two, it was partly rebuilt and enlarged in the 18th century, and the front was remodelled in about 1900. It is timber framed with brick infill, painted at the rear, and rebuilt, refaced and extended in red brick. At the front, the upper floor has applied timber framing, and the roof is tiled. There is an H-shaped plan, consisting of a central hall range with one storey and an attic, and two bays, flanked by gabled cross-wings with two storeys and basements, and two bays, and there is a rear wing with two storeys and an attic. The house is on a plinth, and the upper storeys and attics are slightly jettied. In the centre are two doorways with lean-to porches, above which are two gables dormers. The windows are casements, those in the ground floor with segmental heads.	II
5 Dodington; 52.96737°N 2.68247°W	—	Mid to late 16th century (probable)	The house was extended in the 17th century and remodelled in the 18th century. It is timber framed on a brick plinth, with painted brick infill, rendered at the front, and with slate roofs. There are two storeys and a basement, and an L-shaped plan, consisting of a front range, a rear wing, and a former stable at the rear. On the front to the right is a 19th-century former shop front with Tuscan pilasters, a frieze, a cornice, and a plate glass window. To the left is a door with a rectangular fanlight, further to the left is a passage door, and the windows are cross windows. At the rear is a stair tower, casement windows, and a hipped eaves dormer.	II*
Bull's Head Public House; 52.96815°N 2.68339°W		Late 16th century (probable)	The public house was extended in about 1700, remodelled n the 19th century, and further altered in about 1900. The older parts are timber framed with plastered and painted brick infill, partly rendered, and the refacing, rebuilding and extensions are in red brick. The roof is tiled and hipped at the front, and slated at the rear. There is an L-shaped plan, with a three-storey one-bay range, a two-storey two-bay wing to the left, and a rear wing. The front part has a rendered plinth and a dentilled eaves cornice, and contains a doorway with a rectangular fanlight and a hood on consoles. The windows are a mix of sashes and casements, and in the rear wing is a dormer. The left gable end has a jettied upper storey with a moulded bressumer on fluted brackets.	II
Dodington House; 52.96692°N 2.68198°W	—	c. 1600 (probable)	The house was extended in the 17th century, and extended further and remodelled later. The original part is timber framed with brick infill, partly rendered, and the extensions are in brick, rendered at the front and rear, and the roof is tiled, and hipped at the rear. There are two storeys and an attic, and an H-shaped plan, with a recessed centre, and projecting gabled wings, and a rear two-storey wing. The house has a plinth, chamfered quoins, a coped parapet, and the gables have triangular pediments. The central porch has unfluted Tuscan columns, a frieze and a moulded cornice, and the doorway has a reeded architrave and a rectangular fanlight. The windows in the front are sashes, at the rear are gabled dormers, in the rear wing they are mullioned and transomed casements, and at the rear is exposed timber framing.	II
The Red Cow Public House; 52.96940°N 2.68445°W	—	c. 1600	The house, later a public house, was remodelled in the 19th century. It is timber framed with plaster infill, the front wall has been rebuilt in rendered brick with a dentilled eaves cornice, the rear extension is in red brick, and the roof is slated. There are two storeys, three bays, the right bay recessed, and a rear extension with one storey and an attic. The main doorway has pilasters and a frieze, the doorway to the right has a plain surround, and the windows are casements.	II
20 Saint Mary's Street; 52.97067°N 2.68400°W	—	Late 16th or 17th century	The house was remodelled in the 19th century in Gothick style. It is in rendered timber framing on a tall plinth, partly rebuilt in painted brick, and has a slate roof. There is one storey, an attic and a semi-basement, and three bays, the outer bays gabled. External steps with railings lead up to the central doorway that has a moulded architrave. To the left is a sash window, to the right is a three-light basement window, and the other windows are Gothick casements.	II
17 and 19 Watergate; 52.96788°N 2.68334°W		Late 16th to early 17th century	A pair of timber framed houses, later shops, on a plinth, with plastered and brick infill, partly rendered, and a roof of tile and slate. There are two storeys and three bays. In the ground floor are two 19th-century shop fronts, and to the left is a carriageway. In the upper floor are mullioned casement windows.	II
The Black Bear Public House; 52.97042°N 2.68495°W		Late 16th or early 17th century	A house, later a public house, it was extended in the 17th century and remodelled in the 19th century. It is timber framed, and has applied timbers with plaster infill and a slate roof, hipped at the front. There are two storeys and a basement and a T-shaped plan, with a one-bay entrance range, and a cross-wing to the left with a front of one bay and four bays along the left return. Steps lead up to the doorway, which has a raking hood on shaped brackets. The upper storey of the cross wing is jettied on shaped and fluted brackets. The windows are casements, and there is exposed timber framing at the rear.	II
26 and 28 Watergate; 52.96803°N 2.68329°W	—	Early 17th century (probable)	A house, later an office, it was extended later in the 17th century, and partly rebuilt in the 19th century. The original part is timber framed, the rebuilding is in red brick with a dentilled eaves cornice, and the roof is slated. There are two storeys, two bays, and a single-bay rear wing. In the front is an inserted shop front with plate glass windows and a doorway, and a recessed passage door to the right, under deep fascias, and the windows are sashes.	II
19 and 19A Bluegates; 52.96951°N 2.68397°W	—	Early to mid 17th century	A house, later a shop and flat, it was remodelled in the 10th century. The building is timber framed on a brick plinth, with painted brick infill, and refaced in brick with applied timber framing at the front. It has a dentilled eaves cornice, and a tile roof with a parapeted gable end on the right. There are two storeys and an L-shaped plan, consisting of a two-bay front range, and a rear wing. In the ground floor is a shop front to the right, and a wide passageway to the left. The upper floor contains small-paned casement windows, and in the rear wing there are casement windows in the ground floor and sashes above.	II
Hinton Old Hall; 52.98481°N 2.68559°W	—	Early to mid 17th century	A house with a late 16th-century timber framed core, and later alterations and extensions. It is in red brick with sandstone dressings on a chamfered stone plinth, and has a tile roof with parapeted gables and stone kneelers and copings. There are two storeys and an attic, and a U-shaped plan, with an entrance range of three gabled bays, the middle bay recessed. In the centre is a flat-roofed porch with a dentilled cornice and a coped parapet. Most of the windows are mullioned and transomed, and in the attic are casement windows.	II
Lower Lodge; 52.97914°N 2.63815°W	—	Early to mid 17th century	The former farmhouse is in pebbledashed timber framing with brick infill, a gable end is partly rebuilt in red brick, and the roof is tiled. There are two storeys and an attic, three bays, and a single-storey lean-to at the rear. The windows are casements.	II
18 Green End; 52.96913°N 2.68194°W	—	17th century	A house, later used for other purposes, it was extended to the rear in about 1700. It is timber framed with painted brick infill, partly rebuilt and extended in brick, and with a tile roof, hipped to the right. There are two storeys and an attic, one bay, and a rear wing. In the ground floor is a 19th-century shop front with panelled piers and a fascia. The upper floor contains a mullioned and transomed window, and there is a gabled dormer.	II
20 and 22 Green End; 52.96913°N 2.68173°W	—	17th century	A house, at one time a coaching inn, it was remodelled in the 19th century, and has been used for other purposes. The building is in rendered timber framing, partly rebuilt and extended in red brick, and has a roof of tile and slate, hipped at the rear. There are two storeys and an attic, and an irregular T-shaped plan, with a four-bay front range, a three-storey rear wing, and a lean-to in the angle. In the ground floor are two shop windows, two doorways with triangular pediments, and to the right is a carriage entry. In the upper floor are mullioned and transomed windows, and there are four dormers, three are gabled and the other has a hipped roof.	II
24 Green End; 52.96917°N 2.68153°W	—	17th century (probable)	A house later a shop, it is timber framed with brick infill, rendered at the font, with a tile roof. There are two storeys and three bays. In the ground floor is a shop front with a canted plate glass window and a passageway to the right. The upper floor contains two-light casement windows.	II
37 and 39 High Street; 52.97019°N 2.68473°W	—	Mid 17th century	A pair of houses, later shops and flats, they were extended later in the 17th century, and remodelled in the 19th century. They are in rendered timber framing, the front wall is refaced in brick with a dentilled eaves cornice, and the roof is slated. There are three storeys, three bays, and a rear wing of one bay with three storeys and two bays with two storeys. In the ground floor are two 19th-century shop fronts, the left one larger with a central doorway, and to the right of them is a passage doorway. The upper floors contain sash windows, and in the rear wing is a gabled dormer.	II
16 Saint Mary's Street; 52.97049°N 2.68383°W	—	17th century (probable)	The house, which was remodelled in the 19th century, is in rendered timber framing on a high plinth, and has a tile roof. There are two storeys and one bay. The doorway, to the right, has pilasters with horizontal fluting, a reeded architrave, a frieze, and a moulded cornice. The windows are casements, the window in the upper floor with a moulded architrave.	II
18 Saint Mary's Street; 52.97054°N 2.68384°W	—	17th century (probable)	The house, which was remodelled in the 19th century, is in rendered timber framing with a tile roof. There are two storeys and an attic, and one bay. The doorway to the left has pilaster strips with horizontal fluting, and an entablature with a dentilled cornice. The windows are casements with reeded architraves, and there is a gabled dormer with slate-hung sides.	II
15 and 15A Watergate; 52.96799°N 2.68350°W	—	17th century	A house, later a house and a shop, the oldest part being the rear wing, with the front range dating from about 1700. The rear wing is timber framed with brick infill, and the front range is in red brick on a plinth, with a band, a dentilled eaves cornice, and a tile roof with parapeted gable ends, moulded coping, and shaped kneelers. There are two storeys and an attic, and a front of three bays. To the right is an inserted shop window and doorway, and in the centre is a doorway with a moulded architrave. The windows are three-light casements, and the middle bay in the upper floor is blind and contains a decorative wrought iron bracket.	II
30 and 32 Watergate; 52.96796°N 2.68321°W		17th century (probable)	A pair of timber framed shops with a tile roof, two storeys and four bays. In the ground floor are shop fronts, and the upper floor contains sash windows.	II
The Hermitage Flats; 52.97047°N 2.68403°W	—	17th century (probable)	Two houses, later converted into flats, the older is the right wing. This was remodelled in the 18th century, it is timber framed and rendered, and has a roof of tile and slate. There is one storey and an attic, and two bays. Some windows are sashes, others are casements, and there are two gabled dormers. The other part dates from the mid to late 18th century, it is in rendered brick on a moulded plinth, and has a coped parapet. The windows are sashes with rusticated lintels and raised keystones.	II
The Old House; 52.96732°N 2.68235°W		Mid 17th century	The house was remodelled in the 20th century. It is timber framed with painted infill, and rendered on the front and sides with applied timber framing. There are two storeys and an attic, and two bays. The doorway has a lean-to porch, the windows in the ground floor are cross windows, elsewhere they are casements, and there are two gabled dormers.	II
41–45 High Street; 52.97031°N 2.68484°W	—	Mid to late 17th century	A row of three houses, later shops and flats, that were altered and remodelled in the 19th century. They are in rendered timber framing with applied timber and plaster infill on the front, and a slate roof. There are three storeys and three bays. In the ground floor are 19th-century shop fronts with reeded and panelled pilaster strips, and the doorway on the right has fluted Doric columns. The windows are a mix of sashes and casements.	II
63 Green End; 52.96930°N 2.67952°W	—	Late 17th century	A house, later a shop, it is timber framed with red brick infill, partly painted, partly rendered, on a rendered plinth, and with a tile roof. There are two storeys, two bays, and a single-bay rear wing. In the ground floor is a shop front with a plate glass window, and a segmental-headed doorway to the right with a rusticated surround. To the right is a segmental-headed sash window, and to the left is a passage doorway with a blocked segmental-headed fanlight. The upper floor contains sash windows.	II
12 and 14 Highgate; 52.96668°N 2.68492°W	—	Late 17th century	A pair of timber framed houses with brick infill and a slate roof. There is one storey and an attic, and two bays. The doors have simple moulded surrounds, the windows are casements, there are two gabled dormers on the front, and two raking dormers at the rear.	II
Outbuilding east of The Tithe Barn; 52.97296°N 2.68428°W	—	Late 17th century	A barn, later altered and used for other purposes, it is timber framed with brick infill on a high brick plinth, with rebuilding in red brick with a dentilled eaves cornice, and a tile roof. There are two bays, and the building contains various doorways and vents.	II
36 and 38 High Street; 52.96964°N 2.68439°W	—	1677	The house, later a shop, was remodelled in the late 18th century. It is rendered, probably over brick, with a brick rear extension, and has a moulded string course, a moulded cornice, a parapet with moulded coping, and a tile roof, hipped to the right. There are three storeys, two bays, and a three-storey rear extension. In the ground floor is a shop front of about 1900, with two plate glass windows flanking a recessed central doorway with panelled pilasters and a deep fascia. The upper floors contain sash windows with slightly segmental heads, and between the top floor windows is a wrought iron sign bracket.	II
Bark Hill House; 52.96662°N 2.68383°W	—	c. 1680–1700	The house was remodelled in the 19th century. It is in rendered timber framing on a rendered plinth, with a wooden fascia, a moulded gutter, and a tile roof. There are two storeys and an attic, three bays, and a two-storey rear wing. The central porch has cast iron barley-sugar columns, reeded pilaster strips, and a shallow gabled roof. The doorway has a reeded architrave, a reeded impost band, and a rectangular fanlight. The windows in the main block are mullioned and transomed casements with concave hoods, in the rear wing they are sashes, and there are three gabled dormers. To the left of the doorway is a cast iron boot scraper.	II
Higginson's Almshouses and wall 52.97107°N 2.68552°W		1697	A row of almshouses, which were altered in the 19th century, in red brick with sandstone dressings on a stepped plinth, with chamfered quoins, a dentilled eaves cornice, and a slate roof with parapeted and coped gables and shaped kneelers. There are two storeys and 15 bays, the middle bay projecting under a gable, flanked by quoins and containing a round-headed niche with an architrave, an impost band and a raised keystone, above which is an inscribed tablet. The windows are casements, over the doorways are hood moulds, and there are blank window spaces. Enclosing the yard at the rear is an L-shaped sandstone wall containing a round-arched niche, a round-headed doorway, and two other doorways.	II
Wall and piers, 17 Green End; 52.96919°N 2.68203°W	—	c. 1700	The wall in front of the forecourt is in rendered red brick with stone coping and railings. In the centre is a pair of square sandstone piers, each with a moulded plinth, panels, a moulded cornice, and a globe finial.	II
44 Watergate; 52.96768°N 2.68285°W	—	c. 1700	A house, later a house and a shop, that was remodelled in the 20th century. It is in red brick with sandstone dressings, chamfered quoins, a wooden fascia, and a tile roof with coped parapeted gable ends. There are two storeys and an attic and five bays. To the right is an inserted shop front. The doorway, which has a rectangular fanlight, and the windows, which are casements, have painted stone lintels.	II
Old School House; 52.97120°N 2.68564°W	—	1708	The former school is in red brick on a plinth with a moulded top, and has chamfered quoins, a modillion eaves cornice, and a tile roof with parapeted and coped gables and shaped kneelers. There is one storey and an attic, a front range of five bays, the middle bay projecting under a triangular dentilled pediment, and a gabled rear wing. In the centre is a doorway with a moulded architrave and a hood mould, above which is an inscribed tablet. The windows are cross-windows with moulded cills and raised keystones, and there are two dormers with triangular dentilled pediments.	II*
St Alkmund's Church; 52.97080°N 2.68511°W		1712–13	The church was restored in 1877–79 and in 1885–86, and there have been later alterations. It is built in red sandstone with dressings in grey sandstone, it has a slate roof, and is in Neoclassical style. The church consists of a nave, north and south aisles, a south porch, a chancel with an apsidal east end, and a partly-embraced west tower. The tower has four stages, angle pilaster strips, on the south side is a clock face above a coat of arms, the bell openings have round heads, and at the top is a balustrade that has large corner urn finials with weathervanes, and smaller intermediate urn finials. The south porch is semicircular and has three round-headed arches, an entablature and a balustrade. The windows are round-headed with architraves and raised keystones. Inside the church is a west gallery.	I
Former Presbyterian Chapel; 52.96713°N 2.68256°W	—	1716	The chapel, later used for other purposes, is in red brick rendered at the front, on a moulded plinth, with stone dressings, chamfered quoins, and a hipped tile roof with gablets. The original front is partly obscured by a 19th-century lean-to extension with a central pair of doors with fanlights, and casement windows. Elsewhere there are segmental-headed windows.	II
Barclays Bank and Barclays Bank Chambers; 52.96919°N 2.68357°W	—	1718	Originally the town hall, later used for other purposes, including as a bank. It is in red brick with sandstone dressings on a moulded plinth, with chamfered quoins, flanking pilaster strips, a coped parapet, and a two-span tile roof. There are two storeys and an attic, and three bays. In the ground floor is an arcade of three round-headed arches with Tuscan columns, moulded architraves, and raised keystones. The arcade was originally open, the left two bays are glazed, with a door in the left bay, and the right bay forms an open porch. In the upper floor are sash windows with keystones.	II
3 Dodington; 52.96743°N 2.68262°W	—	c. 1720	A red brick house with sandstone dressings, chamfered quoins, a band, a coped parapet, and a two-span slate roof with parapeted gable ends. There are three storeys and a basement, and four bays. The doorway has unfluted Ionic pilasters and an entablature. The windows are sashes with moulded cills, and raised keystones with moulded tops.	II
4 Bullring; 52.96887°N 2.68322°W	—	Early 18th century	A house, later a shop, in red brick with sandstone dressings, with chamfered quoins, a moulded string course, a band, and a parapet with moulded coping. There are four storeys and two bays. In the ground floor is a modern shop front, and the upper floors contain sash windows, those in the middle two floors with raised keystones.	II
4 High Street; 52.96897°N 2.68347°W	—	Early 18th century	A house, later a shop, in red brick with stone dressings, chamfered quoins, a moulded eaves cornice with scrolled modillions, and a tile roof with a parapeted and coped gable end and shaped kneelers to the right. There are two storeys and an attic, three bays, and a rear wing. In the ground floor is a 10th-century shop front with plate glass windows, panelled pilasters, scrolled brackets and a deep fascia. The upper floor contains sash windows with raised keystones, and there are two hipped dormers.	II
42A and 44 High Street; 52.96985°N 2.68457°W	—	Early 18th century	A house, later two shops and flats, stuccoed, probably over brick, with sandstone dressings, chamfered quoins, a parapet with a frieze, a moulded cornice and a blocking course, and a tile roof with parapeted gable ends. There are three storeys, five bays, and a gabled rear wing. In the ground floor are 19th-century shop fronts with a deep fascia and panelled end-pilasters. The windows are sashes with moulded cills, and raised keystones with moulded tops. At the rear is a doorway with pilaster strips, an entablature and a cornice.	II
Ellesmere House; 52.96673°N 2.68159°W		Early 18th century (probable)	The house possibly dates from the late 17th century. It is timber framed on a high brick plinth, with brick infill, painted at the rear and rendered at the front, the end walls are in red brick, and the roof is tiled with parapeted gable ends, moulded copings, and shaped kneelers. There are two storeys and an attic, five bays, a single-storey lean-to at the rear on the left, and a two-storey wing on the right. Steps with wrought iron railings lead up to a central doorway with a moulded architrave and a gabled porch on carved console brackets. The windows are cross windows, and there are three dormers with hipped roofs.	II
Sundial; 52.97063°N 2.68511°W	—	Early 18th century	The sundial is in the churchyard of St Alkmund's Church. It is in sandstone, and consists of a circular column on two circular steps and one square step. On the top is a circular bronze plate inscribed in Roman numerals, and a triangular gnomon. The sundial is also a scheduled monument.	II
White House School; 52.97138°N 2.68236°W	—	Early 18th century	The building, at one time a school, was remodelled and enlarged in the 19th century, and is in red brick, stuccoed on the front. It consists of a main block with two storeys and three bays with a tile roof, and is flanked by lower two-story one-bay wings with slate roofs. The main block has a moulded plinth, banded rustication, a band, panelled end pilaster strips, and a moulded cornice in the middle bay. In the centre is a porch with paired pilaster strips, a frieze, and a triangular pedimented pediment, and above the door is a rectangular fanlight. The windows are sashes with rusticated voussoirs. In the left wing is a tripartite sash window with a segmental head, and the right bay contains a doorway and a sash window.	II
12 High Street; 52.96910°N 2.68367°W	—	Early to mid 18th century	A house, later a shop, in red brick with stone dressings, chamfered quoins, a fascia, a moulded modillion eaves cornice, and a slate mansard roof. There are three storeys and an attic, and three bays. In the ground floor is a 19th-century shop front with a central doorway, panelled pilasters, a frieze, and a cornice. The upper floors contain sash windows with raised keystones, and there are three gabled eaves dormers.	II
34 High Street; 52.96957°N 2.68434°W	—	Early to mid 18th century	A house, later a shop, in red brick with sandstone dressings on a chamfered stone plinth, with chamfered quoins, a rusticated band, a moulded modillion eaves cornice, and a tile roof with parapeted and coped gable ends and shaped kneelers. There are three storeys and an L-shaped plan with a front of four bays, and four bays along the left return. In the ground floor is a modern shop front, and the upper floors contain sash windows with moulded cills on shaped brackets and raised keystones. In the left return is a doorway with pilaster strips, a frieze with a central panel, and a moulded cornice.	II
56 High Street; 52.97022°N 2.68498°W	—	Early to mid 18th century	A house, later a shop, in red brick, painted at the front, with stone dressings, chamfered quoins, and a tile roof with parapeted gable ends, rounded copings and moulded kneelers. There are two storeys and three bays. In the ground floor is a 20th-century shop front, and the upper floor has two sash windows with moulded cills and raised keystones, with a blind window between.	II
29 Saint Mary's Street; 52.97024°N 2.68332°W	—	Early to mid 18th century	A house, later offices, the building was remodelled in the 19th century. It is rendered, probably over brick, on a moulded plinth, with a cill band, pilaster strips, a moulded cornice and blocking course, and a tile roof, hipped at the rear, with parapeted gable ends. There are two storeys and an attic, and six bays, a recessed porch with chamfered reveals and a doorway with a rectangular fanlight, and an inserted doorway to the right. The windows are sashes, and three dormers with segmental pediments and slate-hung sides.	II
Talbot House; 52.96921°N 2.67979°W	—	Early to mid 18th century	The house was extended at the rear in the 19th century. It is in red brick with stone dressings on a rendered plinth, with a pebbledashed right end wall, dentilled bands, a dentilled cornice, a parapet, and a slate roof. There are three storeys, three bays, the middle bay projecting under a pediment, and a two-storey rear wing. Steps lead up to the central doorway that has a moulded architrave, panelled pilaster strips, a frieze with a central raised panel, a cornice, and a triangular pediment on consoles with shells at the base. Most of the windows are sashes with raised keystones, and the top window in the middle bay has a round-arched head.	II
The Old Rectory; 52.97381°N 2.68397°W	—	1749	The rectory, later a private house, is in red brick with sandstone dressings, on a plinth with a moulded top, with a cornice band, a coped parapet, and a slate roof. There are two storeys, an attic and a basement, five bays, and a two-storey service wing. In the centre is a Tuscan doorway with pilasters, an entablature, and a triangular pediment, and the door has an architrave. The windows are sashes, and there are three flat-roofed dormers.	II*
The Coach House and wall 52.97351°N 2.68398°W	—	c. 1749	Formerly the coach house and stable block to The Old Rectory, the building is in red brick on a plinth, with a band, and a hipped tile roof. There are two storeys and an attic, and five bays, the middle bay projecting forward. The middle bay is gabled with an oculus in the apex, and contains an elliptical-arched carriageway with a raised keystone. The other bays contain elliptical-arched doorways, and there are segmental-headed casement windows in the upper floor and cross windows in the lower floor. From the entrance, two red brick walls with stone coping form enclosures. The walls contain square piers with pyramidal caps, and those flanking the entrance have wrought iron lamp standards.	II
21 Dodington; 52.96673°N 2.68186°W	—	c. 1750 (probable)	A red brick house with stone dressings on a stone plinth, with chamfered quoins, a frieze, a dentilled cornice, and a coped parapet. There are three storeys, five bays, the middle bay projecting under a pediment, and flanking two-storey single-bay wings. Steps lead up to the central doorway that has a rectangular fanlight, a moulded architrave, panelled pilaster strips, and a triangular pediment on carved consoles. The windows are sashes, most with rusticated lintels and raised keystones, those in the middle bay with moulded architraves and cills on brackets, and those in the wings with segmental heads. In the ground floor of the left wing is a carriageway.	II*
17 Dodington; 52.96703°N 2.68205°W	—	Mid 18th century	A house, possibly incorporating a timber framed core, it was remodelled in the 19th century. It is in red brick with stone dressings, rendered at the front, on a plinth, with chamfered quoins, a belt course, a moulded eaves cornice, and a slate roof with a parapeted coped gable end and a shaped kneeler to the left. There are two storeys and an attic, and two bays. The central doorway has a beaded surround, an architrave, a segmental-headed fanlight, and a triangular-pedimented hood on shaped brackets. The windows are sashes with rusticated lintels and raised keystones, and there are two gabled eaves dormers.	II
15 Green End; 52.96920°N 2.68218°W	—	Mid 18th century	The wing of 17 Green End, it is in red brick with stuccoed dressings, rusticated quoins, a string course, a modillion cornice, and a parapet. There are two storeys and two bays. In the ground floor on the right is a carriageway with rusticated jambs and a segmental arch with voussoirs, and a shop window on the left. The upper floor contains sash windows with moulded architraves, keyblocks, and cills on small consoles.	II
17 Green End; 52.96926°N 2.68206°W		Mid 18th century	A red brick house with sandstone dressings on a high moulded plinth, with chamfered quoins, a moulded floor band, a moulded eaves cornice with scrolled modillions and egg and dart decoration, and a tile roof with parapeted gable ends and coped and shaped kneelers. There are two storeys, an attic and a basement, three bays, and a rear service wing. Steps lead up to a central doorway with wrought iron railings, a moulded architrave, a rectangular fanlight, a frieze, a moulded cornice, and a semicircular hood on scrolled brackets. The windows are sashes with keystones, and there are two flat-roofed dormers.	II*
Broughall House; 52.96492°N 2.65740°W	—	Mid 18th century	A farmhouse that was extended in the 19th century, it is in red brick with sandstone dressings, on a plinth, with chamfered quoins, a moulded eaves cornice, and a tile roof with parapeted and coped gable ends and shaped kneelers. There are two storeys and attics, five bays, and a two-storey rear wing. In the centre is a porch-conservatory with a hipped roof, and a doorway with a moulded architrave. The windows are sashes with raised triple keystones.	II
Ice house 52.97259°N 2.68480°W	—	Mid 18th century	The ice house is to the southwest of The Tithe Barn. It is in red brick with a circular plan and an entrance to the northwest, and is covered in earth. Inside is a domed roof with an oculus, and a tapered drain at the base.	II
25 High Street; 52.96964°N 2.68414°W	—	1753	A house, later a shop, in red brick with stone dressings, chamfered quoins, a frieze, a moulded cornice, a coped parapet, and a tile roof. There are three storeys and four bays. In the ground floor is a plate glass window and a doorway to the right. The upper floors contain sash windows with rusticated lintels and raised keystones with moulded tops.	II
Liverpool House; 52.96905°N 2.68337°W		1775	A house, later a shop and flat, it is in red brick with stone dressings, chamfered quoins, a moulded cornice, a coped parapet, and a tile roof with parapeted and coped gable ends. There are three storeys, three bays, and a rear wing. In the ground floor is a complete early 19th-century shop front with Greek Doric columns, a triglyph frieze, a moulded cornice with guttae, and a central doorway with panelled pilasters and carved consoles. The windows are sashes with rusticated lintels, and raised triple keystones. Between the upper two floors is a name board, and there are dormers in the main block and the rear wing.	II
29 Dodington and stable block 52.96575°N 2.68090°W	—	Late 18th century	A house and stable block, later used for other purposes, they are in red brick with tile roofs. The house has a chamfered sandstone plinth, a dentilled eaves cornice, and a two-span roof. There are three storeys, three bays, and a rear wing. In the centre is a porch with Doric columns, an entablature, and a triangular pediment, and the doorway has fluted pilasters and a rectangular fanlight. The windows are sashes, and in the middle bay they are blind. To the left is an elliptical archway linking to the former stable block, which has two storeys and crow-stepped gables.	II
14 High Street; 52.96914°N 2.68374°W	—	Late 18th century	A house, later a shop, in red brick with sandstone dressings, moulded cornices, and a slate mansard roof with parapeted coped gable ends. There are three storeys and an attic, and three bays. In the ground floor is a 20th-century shop front, the upper floors contain sash windows with moulded architraves, and there are two dormers with segmental pediments. Above the middle floor windows is a continuous frieze and cornice with a central segmental pediment.	II
Boundary stone 52.96784°N 2.68461°W	—	Late 18th century (probable)	The boundary stone is set into the wall of No. 16 Mill Street. It is in grey sandstone, and has two parts divided by a vertical line, each part with a rounded top. The left side is inscribed "W" and the right side "D".	II
Milestone, 46 High Street; 52.96992°N 2.68460°W	—	Late 18th century (probable)	The milestone adjacent to the Victoria Hotel is in red sandstone and has a rounded top. It is inscribed "FROM / Chester", and the rest of the inscription is illegible.	II
Game larder, The Old Rectory; 52.97361°N 2.68383°W	—	Late 18th century	The former game larder is timber framed on a brick base, with deep eaves and has a pyramidal slate roof with a square finial. There is one storey and sides of four bays, and it contains small-paned windows.	II
United Reformed Church, church hall, vestry and Sunday school 52.96719°N 2.68181°W		1789	Originally a Congregational Church, it was largely rebuilt in 1813, and subsequently altered. It is built in red brick with a front of rusticated sandstone and a slate roof. The entrance front has two storeys, three bays, and a full-width pediment. In the ground floor is a recessed porch with four unfluted Doric columns and an entablature with an inscribed frieze, and the top storey contains three round-headed windows. Along the sides are four bays with sash windows, round-headed in the upper storey and flat-headed below. At the rear of the church are a two-storey church hall and Sunday school, and a vestry room. Inside the church are galleries on three sides and box pews.	II
Cherwell House; 52.96605°N 2.68124°W	—	c. 1800	A red brick house on a chamfered sandstone plinth, with a cill band, deep eaves at the front, a dentilled eaves cornice at the rear, and a hipped two-span slate roof. There are three storeys and three bays, the middle bay projecting under a pediment. The central doorway has a moulded architrave, a rectangular fanlight, and a cornice on large consoles, and the windows are sashes. In front of the house are wrought iron railings.	II
Saint Mary's House; 52.97051°N 2.68361°W	—	c. 1800	A house, later used for other purposes, it is in red brick with stone dressings, on a plinth, with a cill band, a dentilled moulded eaves cornice, a coped parapet, and a hipped slate roof. There are three storeys and five bays, the middle bay projecting and containing a full-height arched recess with a frieze, a cornice and a triangular pediment. The central doorway has a moulded architrave with horizontally-fluted sides, radially-fluted spandrels, flanking fluted strips, a radial fanlight, and a triangular pediment. The windows are sashes, and flanking the doorway are cast iron boot scrapers. To the right and recessed is the former coach house, with two storeys and two bays.	II
The Bungalow; 52.96615°N 2.68130°W	—	c. 1800	Originally the service block to Cherwell House, later converted into a separate residence. It is in red brick on a rendered plinth, and has a dentilled eaves cornice and a hipped slate roof. There is one storey and two bays. The windows are sashes, and the entrance is at the rear. To the left is a sort wall containing an elliptical-headed doorway.	II
Weston House; 52.96911°N 2.67910°W	—	Late 18th or early 19th century	A house later extended and used for other purposes, it is in red brick with stone dressings, partly rendered in the ground floor, on a tall rendered plinth, with a cill band, a dentilled eaves cornice, a fascia, and slate roofs, partly hipped. There are three storeys, three bays, and flanking recessed two-storey one-bay wings. Steps lead up to the central doorway that has fluted Corinthian pilasters, panelled reveals, a moulded architrave, an entablature, and a triangular pediment containing a circular panel. The windows are sashes with rusticated lintels and triple keystones.	II
Former stable, Weston House; 52.96907°N 2.67935°W	—	Late 18th or early 19th century	The stable, later used for other purposes, is in painted sandstone and brick, it has a tile roof with parapeted gables, copings and shaped kneelers, and is in Gothick style. There is one storey and a loft, and a two-storey lean-to on the left. The building contains a casement window and a doorway, both with segmental heads, cruciform vents, a circular pitching hole, and a loft door.	II
Hassel's lift-up bridge No. 1; 52.96578°N 2.71403°W		c. 1804	This is bridge No. 33 over the Llangollen Canal, an accommodation bridge. It is a bascule bridge, consisting of a wooden frame supporting a pair of pivoted wooden beams, attached by chains to the deck of the bridge at one end and counterweighted at the other.	II
Lock house 52.98106°N 2.71112°W		1806	The lock keeper's cottage is adjacent to Grindley Brook Locks on the Llangollen Canal. It is in painted brick with pilaster strips and a hipped slate roof. There are two storeys and a cruciform plan, with the front end bowed. In front is a semicircular loggia with a six-bay colonnade on octagonal wooden posts. In the ground floor of the bowed front are segmental-headed horizontally-sliding sash windows, and elsewhere the windows are casements with segmental heads; the doorway also has a segmental head.	II
Whitchurch Heritage Centre; 52.96993°N 2.68330°W		1810	Originally a Wesleyan Methodist chapel, later used as a post office, and then as a heritage centre, it is in stuccoed sandstone on a plinth, with the ground floor of the front rusticated, a floor band, a moulded cornice, and a hipped slate roof. There are two storeys, three bays on the front and five on the sides. On the front there are giant pilasters at the corners and between the bays, and above the middle bay is a pediment. The central doorway has Tuscan pilasters, a three-part elliptical fanlight and an entablature, and is flanked by elliptical-arched windows. Above the doorway is a Venetian window, and the other windows on the front and along the sides are round-headed sashes.	II
Loveit memorial 52.97070°N 2.68489°W	—	1815	The memorial is in the churchyard of St Alkmund's Church, and is to the memory of Ann Loveit. It is a chest tomb in grey sandstone. The tomb has a moulded plinth, fluted corner piers and a moulded cornice to flat top. There are oval side panels, and raised fluted oval end panels.	II
2 Bullring; 52.96883°N 2.68331°W	—	Early 19th century	A house, later used for other purposes, in red brick with a painted wooden fascia and a slate roof. There are three storeys and two bays. In the ground floor is a modern shop front, the middle floor contains a tripartite sash window with panelled pilasters, a frieze, and a moulded cornice, and there are two sash windows in the top floor.	II
1 Dodington; 52.96752°N 2.68284°W	—	Early 19th century	A red brick house on a rendered plinth, with a dentilled eaves cornice and a tile roof, on a corner site. There are three storeys and three bays. The central doorway has reeded half-colonnettes, a rectangular fanlight, a frieze, and a cornice. The windows are sashes, in the right return is a first-floor French window with an ornamental cast iron balcony, and to the right is a doorway with a recessed blind semicircular tympanum.	II
6 Dodington; 52.96755°N 2.68252°W	—	Early 19th century	A house, part of a former house, it incorporates a timber framed core with cruck construction from the 14th or 15th century. It is in red brick with a rendered plinth, a dentilled eaves cornice, and a slate roof. There are two storeys and two bays. In the centre is a porch with a gabled hood, and the windows are sashes. The wall between this house and 8 Dodington is a full cruck truss.	II
15 Dodington; 52.96710°N 2.68213°W	—	Early 19th century	The house is rendered on a plinth with a moulded top, the ground floor has banded rustication, there are end pilaster strips, a cill band, and the roof is slated. The house has three storeys and three bays. In the centre is a porch with fluted Ionic columns, unfluted pilasters, and an entablature. The doorway has panelled reveals and soffit, a rectangular fanlight, and side lights. The windows are sashes, those in the lower two floors with moulded architraves.	II
38 and 40 Dodington; 52.97034°N 2.68482°W	—	Early 19th century	A pair of red brick houses on a sandstone plinth, with a band, a moulded eaves cornice, and a tile roof with parapeted and coped gable ends and coped kneelers. There are three storeys and six bays, with gables over the middle two bays. The doorways have moulded architraves and moulded cornices on consoles. The windows are sashes, and in the left return is an oriel window.	II
42 and 44 Dodington; 52.96600°N 2.68083°W	—	Early 19th century	A pair of red brick houses with sandstone dressings on a chamfered plinth, with a dentilled cornice and parapet, and a slate roof with parapeted and coped gable ends. There are three storeys and nine bays. The left doorway has impost blocks, a raised triple keystone, and a triangular pediment, and the right doorway has a rectangular fanlight, pilasters and an entablature. The windows are sashes with stepped lintels and raised keystones, and in the middle bay the windows are blind.	II
9 High Street; 52.96930°N 2.68369°W	—	Early 19th century	A house and shop on a corner site in red brick with a moulded cornice and a rendered blocking course. There are three storeys, two bays on High Street, two bays on Saint Mary's Street, and a recessed quadrant bay on the corner with curved windows. On High Street is a 19th-century shop front with unfluted Ionic pilasters, a frieze and a cornice. The windows are sashes, and on the Saint Mary's Street front is an oriel window.	II
35, 35A and 35B High Street; 52.97016°N 2.68469°W	—	Early 19th century	A pair of houses, later shops, with an earlier timber framed core on a sandstone plinth, with a dentilled eaves cornice, and a slate roof. There are three storeys and three bays. In the ground floor are 19th-century shop fronts with fluted Doric columns, a 20th-century fascia and plate glass windows, and a passage door to the left with rusticated voussoirs. The upper floors contain sash windows with painted lintels and inscribed keystones.	II
58 and 60 High Street; 52.97030°N 2.68507°W	—	Early 19th century	A pair of houses, later shops, with a timber framed, probably 17th-century, core, with brick infill, partly refaced in red brick, and with a slate roof. There are three storeys, four bays, and a short rear wing. In the ground floor are shop fronts with central doorways, and to the left is a carriage entry. The upper floors contain sash windows with stone cills and lintels, and in the third bay the windows are blind.	II
27 Saint Mary's Street; 52.97018°N 2.68319°W	—	Early 19th century	A house in painted brick with a slate roof, two storeys and a slightly projecting attic, and two bays. The central doorway has pilasters with Corinthian-type capitals, a fanlight, and an entablature with a dentilled cornice. The windows are sashes with slightly-segmental heads, and there are two projecting half-dormers with shaped bases, flanking recessed side lights, a dentilled cornice and a flat tops.	II
33 Saint Mary's Street; 52.97062°N 2.68377°W	—	Early 19th century (probable)	A red brick house on a painted sandstone plinth with chamfered rustication, a dentilled eaves cornice, and a slate roof. There are two storeys and an attic, and four bays. The doorway has reeded pilaster strips, a fluted architrave, a frieze, a moulded cornice, and a triangular pediment. To the left is a doorway with a segmental head, above which is a vent. The windows are sashes with segmental heads, and there are two gabled dormers with slate-hung sides, and a datestone, probably re-set.	II
1–7 Talbot Street; 52.96933°N 2.67829°W	—	Early 19th century	A terrace of four red brick houses with a slate roof. There are three storeys, each house has two bays, and at the rear are three single-storey gabled service wings with applied timbers. Each doorway has pilaster strips, a frieze, and a flat hood on shaped brackets. On the front the windows are sashes with painted cills and lintels, and at the rear are segmental-headed casement windows and horizontally-sliding sash windows.	II
Dodington Lodge Hotel; 52.96542°N 2.68047°W		Early 19th century	A house, later a hotel, it is in red brick on a chamfered rendered plinth, with sill bands and slate roofs. There are three storeys, three bays, the middle bay projecting under a triangular pediment with a moulded cornice, and flanking single-storey two-bay wings. In the centre is a porch with fluted Greek Doric columns, unfluted pilasters, an entablature, and a cornice. Steps lead to a doorway that has a moulded architrave and a rectangular fanlight. Flanking the porch are square bay windows, each with a fascia and a cornice, and in the upper floors are sash windows.	II
Havana House; 52.96707°N 2.68537°W	—	Early 19th century	A red brick house with a slate roof, three storeys, and three bays, the central bay projecting. In the centre is a Tuscan porch, and a doorway with a rectangular fanlight. The windows in the lower two floors are sashes, and in the top floor they have been replaced by casements.	II
Havana Terrace; 52.96721°N 2.68556°W	—	Early 19th century	A terrace of ten brick houses with a dentilled eaves cornice and a slate roof. There are two storeys and each house has one bay. At the rear of Nos. 1–7 are lean-to extensions, and at the rear of Nos. 8–10 are gabled wings. The windows are casements with segmental heads.	II
Milestone, 3A Dodington; 52.96752°N 2.68268°W	—	Early 19th century	The milestone outside the house is partly buried in the pavement. It is in grey sandstone with a rounded top. There is a cast iron plate inscribed "20", and the rest of the inscription is obscured.	II
Redbrook Bridge; 52.96622°N 2.72743°W	—	Early 19th century	The bridge carries the A525 road over Red Brook. It is in sandstone and consists of a single semicircular arch. The bridge has a rusticated facing ring and soffit, a keystone, curved abutments, a flat string course, a parapet with chamfered coping, and rectangular end piers.	II
Sitoni House; 52.97042°N 2.68375°W	—	Early 19th century	A painted brick house with a band, a dentilled eaves cornice, and a tile roof. There are three storeys, three bays, and a gabled two-storey rear wing. The central doorway has reeded quarter columns with horizontally-reeded capitals, in panelled pilasters with moulded capitals, and an entablature with a moulded dentilled cornice. The windows are sashes, those in the ground floor tripartite and with slightly segmental heads.	II
The Mount Hotel and screen wall 52.97224°N 2.68823°W	—	Early 19th century	A house, later a hotel, it is in red brick with sandstone dressings, and a two-span slate roof with parapeted coped gable ends and shaped kneelers. There are two storeys and an attic, and a front of three bays. The outer bays are bowed, and each has a plinth, a raised eaves band, a dentilled moulded cornice and a blocking course, and they contain sash windows. The narrower middle bay has a raised parapet, a frieze and a triangular pediment. It contains a cast iron porch with a moulded cornice, and a doorway, approached by steps, with an architrave, a segmental fanlight, a frieze, and a cornice. Recessed on the right is a two-storey service block, and there is a brick screen wall with a sandstone impost band and moulded coping, containing a doorway with a semicircular tympanum.	II
Stable block and coach house, The Mount Hotel; 52.97250°N 2.68852°W	—	Early 19th century	The stable and coach house are in red brick with sandstone dressings and a slate roof, hipped to the left. There are two storeys and five bays, with the stable on the left. The third and fourth bays project forward under a triangular pedimented gable with an oculus in the tympanum. Below are two semicircular windows and a wide doorway, and on the ridge is a cupola with a pyramidal lead cap and a weathervane. To the left is a segmental-headed doorway, and the windows are cross-windows with rusticated lintels and raised keystones.	II
Victoria Hotel; 52.96994°N 2.68469°W	—	Early 19th century	A house later a hotel, it is in red brick, painted at the front, with an eaves band, a moulded cornice, a parapet, and a slate roof. There are three storeys and an L-shaped plan, with a front of four bays, a rear wing, a lean-to in the angle, and an assembly room or ballroom. In the third bay is a doorway with unfluted Ionic columns, an entablature, a dentilled cornice, a panelled soffit, and a rectangular fanlight. The first bay contains a carriageway with a depressed arch, and in the other ground floor bays are shop fronts. The upper floors contain sash windows with slightly segmental heads.	II
30–36 Dodington; 52.96663°N 2.68140°W		1829	A row of four almshouses in Tudor Revival style, with a front of grey sandstone on a chamfered plinth, red brick at the rear, and tile roofs. There is one storey, eight bays, and three parapeted gables. The doorways and sash windows all have chamfered reveals, and above the doors are hood moulds. In the outer gables are narrow rectangular openings, and the middle gable contains an inscribed moulded lozenge-shaped panel.	II
Former St Catherine's Church; 52.96645°N 2.68188°W		1836	The church, designed by Edward Haycock in Greek Revival style, is now redundant. It is built in red brick with a front of Grinshill sandstone, and has a slate roof. The church consists of a nave with transepts at the west end, a short chancel, and an embraced west tower. The west front has five bays. In the centre are two Ionic columns outside which are Tuscan pilasters supporting an entablature and a cornice. Above this is a pediment containing a coat of arms, and rising from it is the tower that has a square lower stage with a clock face on the front and oculi on the sides. Over this is an octagonal lantern with Tuscan antae, an entablature, and a pyramidal cap. In the outer bays are tall small-paned cast iron windows.	II
Walls and piers, St Catherine's Church; 52.96659°N 2.68160°W	—	c. 1836	The walls in front of the forecourt of the church and the gate piers are in grey sandstone. The walls are low and canted to the centre. The piers are square, they are panelled and have panelled semicircular caps.	II
21 Saint John's Street; 52.97035°N 2.68190°W	—	c. 1840	A brick house on a chamfered rusticated plinth, with stone dressings, a moulded cill band, a dentilled eaves cornice, and a slate roof. There are two storeys and three bays, the left bay recessed. The doorway has unfluted Ionic columns, a frieze and a moulded cornice, and the windows are sashes with painted cills and lintels.	II
3 St Mary's Street; 52.96938°N 2.68325°W		1846	Originally a savings bank, later divided into flats, it is in painted sandstone on a moulded plinth, with red brick at the sides and rear, a string course, and a hipped tile roof. It is in Neoclassical style, and has two storeys, and five bays divided and flanked by Tuscan pilasters. Between the storeys is an entablature with a frieze, a moulded cornice, and a blocking course. The middle bay is surmounted by a triangular pediment, and contains a recessed porch with Ionic columns and a pair of doors with a rectangular fanlight. The windows are sashes.	II
Former grammar school 52.97144°N 2.68586°W	—	1848	The grammar school, later used for other purposes, is in red brick with sandstone dressings, windows containing lattice glazing, and slate roofs, and is in Jacobean style. It consists of four blocks, the main block with the hall, the science block on the right, probably the master's house on the left, and probably a coach house to the left of that. The main block has diapering, an entrance range with two storeys, three bays, a parapet, and an oriel window. To the right the hall range has a two-storey canted bay window with a balustrade, and a shaped gable. The science block is also diapered, and has two storeys, four bays, mullioned and transomed windows, and between the blocks is a Tudor arched gateway with a shaped gable and an obelisk finial. The former house has three storeys and three bays, the middle bay recessed, mullioned and transomed windows, shaped gables on the outer bays, and obelisk finials. The former coach house has two storeys, one bay, and casement windows.	II
Old Town Hall Vaults; 52.96930°N 2.68338°W	—	Mid 19th century	A house, later a public house, in Tudor Revival style, it is in red brick with stone dressings, on a stone plinth, with a moulded eaves cornice, and a slate roof with parapeted gable ends, moulded copings, and shaped kneelers. There are two storeys and a T-shaped plan, with a slightly projecting gabled cross-wing to the left, and two bays to the right. The central doorway has chamfered reveals and a hood mould, and flanking it are canted bay windows. Above the doorway is a canted oriel window, and the outer bays contain casement windows with panels below and hood moulds above.	II
Hinton Hall; 52.99083°N 2.69518°W	—	1859	A country house designed by S. Pountney Smith in Jacobean style. It is in red brick with diapering in blue brick, red sandstone dressings, on a chamfered plinth, with moulded string courses, a coped parapet with corner finials, and a tile roof with coped parapeted gables and finials. The house consists of a main block with two storeys, an attic and a basement, and a service wing to the northeast with three storeys and an attic. In the entrance front is a two-storey canted porch with a pierced parapet, and a doorway with a rusticated architrave and a keystone, unfluted columns, and a segmental pediment. The windows are mixed, some are cross windows, and others are mullioned, transomed, or mullioned and transomed; there are also bay windows, and oriel windows.	II
Footbridge; 52.97051°N 2.67112°W	—	1859	The footbridge is to the north of Whitchurch Railway Station, and was built for the London and North Western Railway Company. It is a suspension bridge to carry pedestrians over the line, and has a single span.	II
St John's Church and church hall 52.97107°N 2.68144°W		1877–79	The Methodist church and church hall are in Grinshill sandstone and have tile roofs. The church is in Decorated style, and has a cruciform plan, consisting of a nave, a north aisle, a south porch, north and south transepts, an apsidal chancel, a southeast organ chamber, and a northwest steeple and vestry. The steeple has a three-stage tower with angle buttresses, a clock face on the west side, and a broach spire with lucarnes. The church hall to the northeast has a two-span roof, a south porch and lancet windows.	II
Churton Memorial Drinking Fountain; 52.96952°N 2.67878°W		1882	A drinking fountain designed by John Douglas in Gothic Revival style, it is in sandstone and has an octagonal plan. The base has a moulded cornice, and contains two chamfered recesses containing copper lion-mask spouts and semicircular bowls, with former semicircular animal troughs to each side, and an inscription. Above is a pinnacle with a crocketed spire and a wrought iron cross finial.	II
40 and 42 High Street; 52.96974°N 2.68448°W	—	1904	A pair of shops in red brick with a cast iron front and a red brick parapet with sandstone coping. There are three storeys, nine bays, and rear ranges, on the left with two storeys and eight bays, on the right with three storeys, and at the end with two storeys. In the ground floor are two shop fronts, a central carriage entry flanked by cast iron columns, and a deep fascia. The middle floor contains a round-arched arcade, both upper floors have columns and pierced spandrels, and between them is a pierced frieze.	II
War memorial 52.96871°N 2.67650°W		1920	The war memorial stands in an enclosure, and is in Hollington stone. It consists of an obelisk with a wreath wrapped around its top, on a multi-stepped plinth. On the memorial are plaques with inscriptions and the names of those lost in the two World Wars. Behind the memorial is a sundial with an inscription on the base.	II

== See also ==
- Listed buildings in Whitchurch Rural
