= William Everingham =

William Everingham (1856 - 14 September 1919) was Archdeacon of Suffolk from 1917 until his death

He studied for the priesthood at Lincoln Theological College and was ordained Deacon in 1879; and Priest in 1880. After a curacy in Diss he served as a Chaplain to the Forces in Singapore, Hong Kong and Malacca. He was Missioner of the Diocese of Salisbury from 1890 to 1900; and Chaplain to the Bishop of Bristol from 1900 until 1904 when he became that diocese's Missioner, a post he held until his appointment as Archdeacon.

He died on 14 September 1919; and his wife Clara in 1932.

Church of England titles
Preceded by Charles D’Aguilar Lawrence	Archdeacon of Suffolk; 1919–1938	Succeeded by James George Reginald Darling
