= Thomas Wonnacott =

Thomas Oswald Wonnacott (22 July 1869 – 7 December 1957) was Archdeacon of Suffolk from 1938 to 1947.

Wonnacott was born in Liskeard, educated at King's College, Cambridge and ordained in 1893. He served curacies at Winchcombe, Ivybridge and Tavistock; and held incumbencies at Lanteglos, Great Bricett, Little Finborough and Stonham Aspal.

Church of England titles
| Preceded by James Darling | Archdeacon of Suffolk; 1938–1947 | Succeeded by Christopher Owen George |
