= Joseph Woolley (archdeacon of Suffolk) =

English teacher and cleric (1815–1892)

Joseph Woolley (1815–1892) was archdeacon of Suffolk from 1887 to 1892.

Woolley was educated at Oakham School and Emmanuel College, Cambridge; and ordained in 1842. His first post was a curacy at Teversham. After this he was Warden of Queen's College, Birmingham then second master at King Edward VI School, Bury St Edmunds. In 1855 he became rector of East Bergholt.

He died on 22 April 1892.

Church of England titles
Preceded by Robert Groome	Archdeacon of Suffolk; 1887–1892	Succeeded by Richard Hudson Gibson
