= Claud Scott =

Archdeacon of Suffolk (1901–1983)

Claud Syms Scott (31 August 1901 – 14 October 1983) was Archdeacon of Suffolk from 1962.

Scott was educated at Brentwood School and Trinity College, Oxford. He was ordained in 1927 and began his career with a curacy in Bedminster. He was Curate in charge at All Hallows Ipswich from 1930 to 1938; Vicar of Exning with Landwade from 1938 to 1954;Master of the Worshipful Company of Armourers and Brasiers in 1951; Rural Dean of Newmarket from 1946 to 1954;Rector of Stradbroke with Horham and Athelington from 1954 to 1958;Rector of St Mary Stoke from 1958 to 1962; Rural Dean of Ipswich from 1958 to 1961; and Vicar of Hoxne with Denham St John from 1962 to 1970.

Church of England titles
Preceded by Christopher Owen George	Archdeacon of Suffolk; 1962–1970	Succeeded by Peter Harold Trahair Hartley
