= Listed buildings in Whitchurch Rural =

Whitchurch Rural is a civil parish in Shropshire, England. It contains 15 listed buildings that are recorded in the National Heritage List for England. Of these, two are listed at Grade II*, the middle of the three grades, and the others are at Grade II, the lowest grade. The parish is to the south and east of the town of Whitchurch, and contains a number of villages and smaller settlements, including Alkington, and is otherwise rural. The listed buildings consist of houses and farmhouses, two churches, and a pair of limekilns.

== Key ==
Grade	Criteria
II*	Particularly important buildings of more than special interest
II	Buildings of national importance and special interest

== Buildings ==
Name and location	Photograph	Date	Notes	Grade
Alkington Hall; 52.94875°N 2.70002°W		1592	The house incorporates earlier material and has a timber framed core. It is built in red brick with grey brick diapering and Grinshill sandstone dressings on a chamfered plinth, with quoins, a moulded eaves cornice, and a two-span roof in tile and slate with parapeted coped gables, and obelisk and ball finials. There are two storeys, an attic and a basement, a main block of three wide bays, a rear wing with a crow-stepped gable, and a two-storey lean-to on the east side. In the centre is a gabled porch, at the rear is a Tudor arched doorway, and the windows are mullioned and transomed.	II*
Grove Farmhouse; 52.95004°N 2.63282°W	—	Mid to late 16th century	The farmhouse was later extended. The original part is timber framed with wattle and daub and brick infill, partly pebbledashed, the partial rebuilding and extensions are in red brick, and there is a tile roof. There are two storeys and a T-shaped plan, with a single-bay hall range, and a two-bay cross-wing to the east. The upper storey and the gable of the cross-wing are jettied, the upper storey having a moulded and ornamented bressumer. In the hall range is an oriel window, and the other windows are casements. The extensions consist of two parallel ranges at the rear and a lean-to on the right.	II
Tilstock Hall Farmhouse; 52.93418°N 2.68384°W	—	Mid to late 16th century	The farmhouse was extended in 1682 and 1861. The original part is timber framed with brick infill, partly replaced in brick, the 17th-century extension is in red brick with sandstone dressings, and the roofs are tiled. The 19th-century extension is in red brick with dressings in blue brick and sandstone, and with a slate roof, and is in Gothic style. There are two storeys, and a front of three bays. In the older parts, the windows are casements, and in the 19th-century part they are cross-windows. On the front is a two-storey gabled porch.	II
Beech Cottage; 52.95017°N 2.62723°W	—	Early 17th century	A timber framed cottage with infill in wattle and daub and brick and a tile roof. There are two storeys and two bays and a lean-to extension. The windows are casements.	II
Pimhill Cottage; 52.95253°N 2.63895°W	—	Early 17th century	A pair of cottages with a 19th-century extension. The original part is timber framed with plastered and painted brick infill on a brick plinth, partly rebuilt and extended in painted and rendered brick. It is partly in two storeys with an attic, and partly in two storeys, and it has an L-shaped plan with a front range of four bays, and a one-bay rear wing. The windows are casements, and there are gabled eaves dormers. On the right is a 19th-century extension with two storeys, one bay, a canted bay window in the ground floor, and a casement window above.	II
Laurel House; 52.94917°N 2.66692°W	—	Early to mid 17th century	The house is timber framed with plastered infill on a brick plinth, and has a slate roof. There are two storeys and four bays. On the front is a gabled porch, and the windows are casements.	II
Shropshire Gate Farmhouse; 52.98238°N 2.62427°W	—	Mid 17th century	The farmhouse was extended in the 19th century. The original part is in pebbledashed timber framing, partly rebuilt in red brick, and the extension is in rendered brick and the roofs are slated. The older part has one storey and an attic and three bays, the extension to the west has two storeys and seven bays, the middle three bays projecting under a gable, and there is a single-storey lean-to at the rear. The windows are casements, there are two gabled eaves dormers, and a lean-to porch.	II
Ash Grove; 52.95413°N 2.64238°W	—	Mid to late 17th century	The house was altered and extended in the 19th century, it is in pebbledashed brick on a timber framed core, and has slate roofs. The original range has two storeys and an attic and two bays, parallel and to the northwest is a later three-storey range, and there are two-storey extensions to the northeast and the southeast. The central doorway has an architrave, with a fluted impost band, panelled reveals, and a rectangular fanlight with lattice glazing. In the ground floor are two canted bay windows, the other windows are sashes, and in the upper floor is a balcony with a cast iron balustrade.	II
Tudor Cottage; 52.96858°N 2.64823°W	—	Mid to late 17th century	A cottage that was extended in the 19th century, and has been divided into two dwellings. The original part is timber framed with brick and plastered infill and a slate roof. There is one storey and an attic and three bays. The extension to the right is in rendered brick and has two storeys, one bay, and a gabled porch. The windows are casements, and there is one raking dormer and one gabled dormer.	II
Dearnford Hall; 52.94559°N 2.67962°W	—	c. 1680–1700	The farmhouse is in red brick with grey sandstone dressings on a moulded stone plinth, and has chamfered quoins, a string course, a moulded modillion eaves cornice, and a hipped slate roof. There are two storeys and attics, and an L-shaped plan, with a front of seven bays. In the centre is a porch with a triangular pedimented gable containing a cartouche and a grotesque head in the tympanum. The doorway has panelled pilaster strips, a frieze and a cornice, and the windows are sashes with moulded architraves.	II
Ash Hall; 52.95434°N 2.64048°W	—	Mid 18th century	A red brick farmhouse with grey sandstone dressings on a plinth with a moulded top, quoins, a string course, a moulded modillion eaves cornice, and a hipped tile roof. There are two storeys, an attic and a basement, and a square plan with a front of five bays. The middle bay is flanked by giant Corinthian pilasters carrying sections of an entablature and a triangular pediment with a circular window in the tympanum. The central doorway has a moulded architrave with pilaster strips, a rectangular fanlight, a keystone, a pulvinated frieze, and a segmental pediment on carved consoles. The windows are sashes with moulded cills.	II*
Ash House Farmhouse; 52.95037°N 2.63409°W	—	Mid 18th century	The farmhouse was altered and extended in the 19th century. It is in red brick with grey sandstone dressings on a plinth, with a modillion cornice and a blocking course, and a tile roof. There are three storeys and an attic and five bays, a two-storey service wing to the right, and a two-storey flat-roofed extension projecting forwards. The central doorway has Tuscan pilasters supporting an entablature, and there is a similar doorway at the rear. The windows are sashes with raised keystones and in the top floor they have segmental lintels.	II
Limekilns; 52.93534°N 2.72609°W	—	c. 1804	The limekilns are in grey and yellow sandstone. They consist of a pair of kilns with segmental arches, corner piers and canted retaining walls. Earth is banked up at the rear.	II
Christ Church, Tilstock; 52.93633°N 2.68194°W		1835	The church was designed by Edward Haycock in Classical style. It is built in red brick with some red sandstone dressings and a slate roof. The church consists of a nave and a chancel in one cell, and a partly embraced west tower. The tower has two stages, and has a west doorway, corner pilasters, a clock face, a slightly corbelled bell stage, a frieze and a cornice and a steep pyramidal roof with a cross finial. The windows in the body of the church have round arches and contain small panes with cast iron glazing bars. Inside is a west gallery on cast iron Doric columns.	II
Christ Church, Ash Magna; 52.95767°N 2.62858°W		1836	The chancel was rebuilt and enlarged in 1901. The church is built in red brick and grey sandstone with red sandstone dressings and a slate roof. It consists of a nave in Early English style, a chancel in Decorated style, and a west tower partly embraced by the nave, and containing a porch. The tower has two stages, with diagonal buttresses, a coved string course, and an embattled parapet with chamfered coping, and panelled and crocketed corner pinnacles. Inside is a west gallery on fluted Ionic square posts.	II

== See also ==
- Listed buildings in Whitchurch Urban
