= Terry Gibson (priest) =

English priest (1937–2015)

Terence Allen (Terry) Gibson (23 October 1937 – 26 September 2015) was a senior Anglican priest. He was Archdeacon of Suffolk from 1984 to 1987; and Archdeacon of Ipswich from 1987 to 2005.

Gibson was educated at Jesus College, Cambridge and Ripon College Cuddesdon. After a curacy at St Chad, Kirkby he was Warden of Centre 63, Kirkby from 1966 to 1975; and Rector of Kirkby from 1975 to 1984; and Rural Dean of Walton from 1979 to 1984.

Church of England titles
Preceded by Donald Smith	Archdeacon of Suffolk; 1984–1987	Succeeded by Neil Robinson
Preceded by Jeremy Walsh	Archdeacon of Ipswich; 1987–2005	Succeeded by Post left vacant
