= Robert Bostock (cleric) =

Robert Bostock, DD (10 July 1607, Buckinghamshire – 26 November 1640 Lincolnshire) was Archdeacon of Suffolk from January 1640 until his death

Bostock was educated at Merton College, Oxford. He held livings at Alcester, Romsey, Exton, and Mottisfont. In 1633 he was granted the degree of D.D. by the University of St Andrews. His visitation articles of 1640 were in a tradition going back to Theophilus Aylmer, archdeacon of London in 1625, detailed enquiries into church furnishings and ritual. He died in 1640 and was buried in Chichester Cathedral.
