= Christopher George (priest) =

Christopher Owen George (30 September 1891 – 8 September 1977) was Archdeacon of Suffolk from 1947 to 1961.

George was educated at Ipswich School and Selwyn College, Cambridge; and ordained Deacon in 1914 and Priest in 1915. After a curacy in Great Yarmouth he was Associate Secretary of Dr Barnardo's Homes from 1919 to 1923. He was an Assistant Master at his old school from 1923 to 1927; Curate of St Mary le Tower, Ipswich from 1923 to 1925; Vicar of St Augustine, Ipswich from, 1927 to 1934; Rector of St Mary Stoke, Ipswich from 1934 to 1947; and Rector of Sproughton from 1947, in conjunction with his work as Archdeacon.

Church of England titles
Preceded by Thomas Wonnacott	Archdeacon of Suffolk; 1947–1961	Succeeded by Claud Scott
