= Edwardstone Woods =

Protected area in Suffolk, England

Coordinates: 52.046°N 0.819°E

- Site of Special Scientific Interest
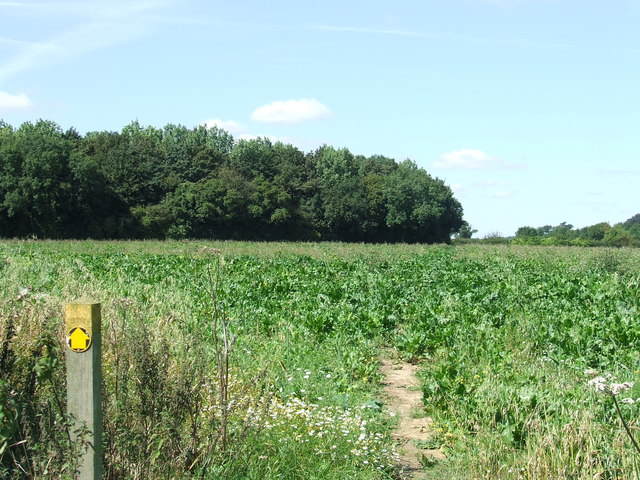
- Cowper's Wood
- Location of Edwardstone Woods.
- Area of search: Suffolk
- Grid reference: TL 934 424
- Interest: Biological
- Area: 27.0 hectares
- Notification date: 1986
- Location map: Magic Map

Edwardstone Woods is a 27 hectare biological Site of Special Scientific Interest near Edwardstone in Suffolk, England. It is in four areas, Park Wood with the adjacent High Wood, Cowper's Wood, Stallington Wood and Priory Down.

These are ancient coppice with standards woods, which are mainly ash, maple and hazel, but there are large stands of hornbeam and small-leaved lime in some areas. The diverse ground flora is typical of Suffolk boulder clay soils.

The woods are private with no public access.
