= James Darling (priest) =

James George Reginald Darling (31 October 1867 – 24 July 1938) was Archdeacon of Suffolk from 1919

He was the third son and youngest of the seven children of James George Darling (18 October 1825 – 5 May 1891), Rector of Eyke, and his second wife Mary Emily née Johnson, married at Trinity Church, Chester, on 2 December 1854; James's first wife was Louisa Susanna Molyneux who died on 17 August 1853, without issue. Young James was baptised at Eyke on 16 February 1868 and was educated at Haileybury and Jesus College, Cambridge

Ordained in 1891, Darling's first post was as curate at Twyford, Hampshire; during which time he was also a master at the local prep school. On 16 December 1893, on the presentation of his mother, was instituted to the Rectory of Eyke. He was on the East Suffolk Education Committee from 1903; Rural Dean of Wilford from 1912; a County Councillor from 1913; and a County Alderman from 1921.

Church of England titles
Preceded by William Everingham	Archdeacon of Suffolk; 1919–1938	Succeeded by Thomas Wonnacott
