= Listed buildings in Edwardstone =

Civil Parish in Suffolk, England

Edwardstone is a village and civil parish in the Babergh District of Suffolk, England. It contains 32 listed buildings that are recorded in the National Heritage List for England. Of these one is grade I and 31 are grade II.

This list is based on the information retrieved online from Historic England.

== Key ==
Grade	Criteria
I	Buildings that are of exceptional interest
II*	Particularly important buildings of more than special interest
II	Buildings that are of special interest

== Listing ==
Name	Grade	Location	Type	Completed (Note: The date given is the date used by Historic England as significant for the initial building or that of an important part in the structure's description.)	Date designated	Grid ref. (Note: The grid reference is based on the British national grid reference system, sometimes known as OSGB36, used by the Ordnance Survey.) Geo-coordinates	Notes	Entry number (Note: The "List Entry Number" is a unique number assigned to each listed building and scheduled monument by Historic England.)	Image	Wikidata
Church of St Mary the Virgin	I		church		23 January 1958	TL9402442071; 52°02′35″N 0°49′40″E		1194451	Church of St Mary the Virgin More images	Q17542249
Hideaway Corner	II		building		10 July 1980	TL9508343151; 52°03′09″N 0°50′38″E		1037307	Hideaway Corner More images	Q26289017
Home Farmhouse	II				23 January 1958	TL9406542031; 52°02′34″N 0°49′42″E		1037306	Upload Photo	Q26289016
Temple Bar	II		architectural structure		10 July 1980	TL9429542222; 52°02′40″N 0°49′54″E		1194458	Temple Bar More images	Q26489083
Borehouse Manor Farmhouse	II	Edwardstone Road, Groton			10 July 1980	TL9562542044; 52°02′32″N 0°51′04″E		1194529	Upload Photo	Q26489151
Crossways	II	Mill Green			10 July 1980	TL9522242535; 52°02′49″N 0°50′44″E	a timber-framed and plastered house	1037309	Upload Photo	Q26289021
Earls Cottages	II	Mill Green			10 July 1980	TL9514342700; 52°02′54″N 0°50′40″E	a timber-framed and plastered house	1037308	Upload Photo	Q26289019
General Stores	II	Mill Green			10 July 1980	TL9516342605; 52°02′51″N 0°50′41″E	a timber-framed and plastered house	1194532	Upload Photo	Q26489154
Mill Green Cottage	II	Mill Green			10 July 1980	TL9517542527; 52°02′48″N 0°50′41″E	a timber-framed and plastered house	1037310	Upload Photo	Q26289022
Mill Green End	II	Mill Green			10 July 1980	TL9507342897; 52°03′00″N 0°50′37″E	a timber-framed and plastered house	1194543	Upload Photo	Q26489164
Moat Farm Cottage	II	Mill Green			10 July 1980	TL9509142412; 52°02′45″N 0°50′37″E	a timber-framed and plastered house	1037311	Upload Photo	Q26289023
Sans Souci	II	Mill Green			10 July 1980	TL9504742419; 52°02′45″N 0°50′34″E	a timber-framed and plastered house	1037312	Upload Photo	Q26289024
The Thatched Cottage	II	Mill Green			10 July 1980	TL9506242416; 52°02′45″N 0°50′35″E	a timber-framed and plastered house	1194539	Upload Photo	Q26489160
Tudor Cottage	II	Mill Green			10 July 1980	TL9521442483; 52°02′47″N 0°50′43″E	a timber-framed and plastered house	1194534	Upload Photo	Q26489156
Barn to the North of Lynn's Hall	II	Priory Green	barn		10 July 1980	TL9360343586; 52°03′25″N 0°49′21″E		1285640	Barn to the North of Lynn's Hall More images	Q26574315
Lynn's Hall	II	Priory Green	building		23 January 1958	TL9361543539; 52°03′23″N 0°49′21″E		1037313	Lynn's Hall More images	Q26289025
Priory Cottage	II	Priory Green			10 July 1980	TL9392843692; 52°03′28″N 0°49′38″E		1351439	Upload Photo	Q26634546
Priory Green Cottage	II	Priory Green			10 July 1980	TL9389843675; 52°03′27″N 0°49′37″E		1037314	Upload Photo	Q26289026
Hathaway Cottage Little Thatch	II	Round Maple	building		10 July 1980	TL9524843757; 52°03′28″N 0°50′48″E	a renovated 17th to 18th century single-storey timber-framed and plastered house	1037315	Hathaway Cottage Little Thatch More images	Q26289027
Quicks Farmhouse	II	Round Maple			21 March 2005	TL9448143801; 52°03′30″N 0°50′07″E	a timber-framed and plastered house with a red brick front, gable ends	1391365	Upload Photo	Q26670730
Seasons	II	Round Maple	house		10 July 1980	TL9513543660; 52°03′25″N 0°50′41″E	a timber-framed and plastered single-storey thatched house with attics	1194557	Seasons More images	Q26489178
The Flushing	II	Round Maple	house		10 July 1980	TL9505943514; 52°03′20″N 0°50′37″E	an 18th or early 19th century timber-framed and plastered house	1351440	The Flushing More images	Q26634547
Christmas House	II	Sherbourne Street			10 July 1980	TL9549841243; 52°02′06″N 0°50′55″E		1037318	Upload Photo	Q26289031
Edwardstone House	II	Sherbourne Street			23 January 1958	TL9553341128; 52°02′03″N 0°50′57″E		1194573	Edwardstone House	Q26489194
Edwardstone Lodge	II	Sherbourne Street			10 July 1980	TL9539141353; 52°02′10″N 0°50′50″E		1351442	Upload Photo	Q26634549
Edwardstone War Memorial	II	Sherbourne Street, CO10 5PG	war memorial		6 November 2020	TL9464942159; 52°02′37″N 0°50′13″E		1470350	Edwardstone War Memorial More images	Q101411691
Garden Wall to Sherbourne House	II	Sherbourne Street	wall		10 July 1980	TL9563340986; 52°01′58″N 0°51′02″E		1351441	Garden Wall to Sherbourne House More images	Q26634548
Juglans	II	Sherbourne Street			10 July 1980	TL9561041016; 52°01′59″N 0°51′01″E		1037317	Upload Photo	Q26289030
Manora	II	Sherbourne Street			10 July 1980	TL9552641231; 52°02′06″N 0°50′57″E		1194561	Manora More images	Q26489182
Sherbourne Cottage	II	Sherbourne Street			10 July 1980	TL9548441308; 52°02′09″N 0°50′55″E		1037316	Upload Photo	Q26289028
Sherbourne House	II	Sherbourne Street			23 January 1958	TL9562140956; 52°01′57″N 0°51′01″E		1194566	Upload Photo	Q26489187
Sideways	II	Sherbourne Street			10 July 1980	TL9545141284; 52°02′08″N 0°50′53″E		1285618	Upload Photo	Q26574296

== See also ==
- Grade I listed buildings in Suffolk
- Grade II* listed buildings in Suffolk

== Sources ==
- Bettely, James; Pevsner, Nikolaus (2015) [1961], Suffolk: West, The Buildings of England, New Haven and London: Yale University Press, ISBN 978-0-300-19655-9
