= Judy Hunt =

English priest (born 1957)

Judy Hunt, MRCVS (born Darwen, 16 April 1957) is an English priest, who served as Archdeacon of Suffolk from 2009 to 2012.

Hunt was educated at the University of Bristol, the Royal Veterinary College, Fitzwilliam College, Cambridge and Ridley Hall, Cambridge. She trained as a vet and was a lecturer in equine veterinary science at the University of Liverpool.

She was ordained deacon in 1991 and priest in 1994. She was a curate in Heswall, and then Priest in charge of Tilston (1995–2003). She was the Bishop of Chester's Advisor for Women in Ministry (1995–2000); a Canon Residentiary at Chester Cathedral (2003–9) and Director of Mission and Ministry from 2003 until her appointment as Archdeacon. She has been Rector of St Alkmund's Church, Whitchurch, Shropshire since 2012.

Church of England titles
Preceded by Geoffrey Arrand	Archdeacon of Suffolk; 2009–2012	Succeeded by Ian Morgan
