= Rhiannon King =

British Anglican priest

The Right Reverend Rhiannon King
- Bishop of Southampton
- Church: Church of England
- Diocese: Diocese of Winchester
- In office: 2024 to present
- Other post: Archdeacon of Ipswich (2019–2024)

Orders
- Ordination: 2000 (deacon); 2001 (priest)
- Consecration: 18 October 2024 by Justin Welby

Personal details
- Born: Rhiannon Elizabeth Jones; 1972 (age 53–54) Oxford, Oxfordshire, England
- Denomination: Anglicanism
- Education: University of Exeter; London School of Theology; Ridley Hall, Cambridge; Anglia Ruskin University

Rhiannon Elizabeth King (née Jones; born 1972) is a British Anglican bishop. Since October 2024, she has served as the Bishop of Southampton, a suffragan bishop in the Diocese of Winchester.

== Early life and education ==
King was born in 1972 in Oxford, England. She was educated at Oxford High School, an all-girls independent school. She studied theology at Exeter University, graduating with a Bachelor of Theology (BTh) degree in 1993. She went on to study biblical hermeneutics at the London School of Theology, graduating with a Master of Arts (MA) degree from Brunel University in 1994. From 1998 to 2000, she trained for ordination at Ridley Hall, Cambridge. She graduated with a further MA in pastoral theology from Anglia Ruskin University in 2005.

== Ordained ministry ==
She was ordained in the Church of England as a deacon in 2000 at Ely Cathedral and as a priest in 2001. She served her title as Team Curate in the Huntingdon Team Ministry between 2000 and 2004. She was the Rector of Fulbourn, Great Wilbraham and Little Wilbraham with Six Mile Bottom from 2004 to 2010. She was then the Transforming Church Co-ordinator and later the Director of Mission in the Diocese of Birmingham. In March 2019, she was appointed Archdeacon of Ipswich in the Diocese of St Edmundsbury and Ipswich. She was also the Director of Inspiring Ipswich — a seven-year project aiming to develop 25 new worshipping communities in Ipswich Deanery and to help 1500 to find faith.

From 2005 to 2010, she was an elected member of the General Synod of the Church of England. She also served on the Liturgical Commission.

She is currently a trustee of Leading your Church into Growth, the Elizabeth Walter Charity, the Suffolk Clergy Charity and the Diocesan Board of Finance in the Diocese of St Edmundsbury and Ipswich. She is also a 'Gregory Associate' (church planting network).

On 13 September 2024, she was announced as the next Bishop of Southampton, a suffragan bishop in the Diocese of Winchester. She was nominated on 14 October, and consecrated as a bishop by Justin Welby, Archbishop of Canterbury, during a service at Canterbury Cathedral on 18 October 2024.
