= Kenneth Child =

British Anglican priest

Kenneth Child (6 March 1916 – 25 October 1983) was Archdeacon of Sudbury from 1970 until his death.

Child was educated at Queen Elizabeth Grammar School, Wakefield and the University of Leeds. After a period of study at the College of the Resurrection, Mirfield he was ordained in 1942. His first post was a curacy at Tonge Moor. He was a Chaplain to the Forces from 1944 to 1947 when he returned to Tonge Moor as its Vicar. He was Chaplain of Guy’s Hospital from 1955 to 1959 when he became Rector of Newmarket, a post he held for ten years; also serving as its Rural Dean from 1963. He was then appointed Rector of The Thurlows with Little Bradley; and an Archdeacon the following year.

Church of England titles
Preceded by David Rokeby Maddock	Archdeacon of Sudbury; 1970–1983	Succeeded by Donald John Smith
