= Richard Gibson (priest) =

19th century English clergyman

Richard Hudson Gibson was Archdeacon of Suffolk from 1892 to 1901.

Gibson was educated at Trinity College, Cambridge. Ordained in 1851, his first posts were curacies at St Martin at Palace, Norwich then St Mary, Rickinghall Superior. He was the incumbent at St James, East Cowes from 1864 to 1868 when he became Rector of Lound, a post he held for the rest of his life. He was Rural Dean of Lothingland from 1874 until his appointment as Archdeacon.

He died on 19 January 1904.

Church of England titles
Preceded by Joseph Woolley	Archdeacon of Suffolk; 1892–1901	Succeeded by Charles D’Aguilar Lawrence
