= Thomas Browne (Archdeacon of Ipswich) =

British Anglican priest

Thomas Robert Browne, FKC (15 June 1889 – 13 August 1978) was Archdeacon of Ipswich from 1946 until 1963.

Browne was a captain in the Dorset Regiment during World War I. After this he studied at King's College London; and was ordained in 1920. After a curacy in Tottenham he held incumbencies at Edwardstone, Earl Soham, Newmarket, Elmsett and Shotley. He was an honorary canon at St Edmundsbury Cathedral from 1936 to 1946.

Church of England titles
Preceded by Eric Buckley	Archdeacon of Ipswich; 1946–1963	Succeeded by Charles Hooper
