= Charles Lawrence (priest) =

Archdeacon of Suffolk from 1901 to 1917

Charles D’Aguilar Lawrence (27 November 1847 – 14 April 1935) was Archdeacon of Suffolk from 1901 to 1917.

The second son of the Rev. C. W. Lawrence, sometime incumbent of St Luke, Liverpool, he was educated at Eton and Christ Church, Oxford. Ordained in 1874, his first posts were curacies at Redenhall then Paddington. He was Rector of Bermondsey from 1879 to 1889; and then of Lowestoft from 1889 to 1901. He was Rural Dean of Lothingland from 1892 to 1901; and then of Wilford from 1901 to 1911.

Church of England titles
Preceded by Richard Gibson	Archdeacon of Suffolk; 1900–1917	Succeeded by William Everingham
