= Donald Smith (priest) =

English priest (1926–2014)

Donald John Smith (10 April 1926 – 22 August 2014) was a senior Anglican priest. He was Archdeacon of Suffolk from 1975 to 1984; and Archdeacon of Sudbury from 1984 to 1991.

Smith was educated at the University of Wales and Clifton Theological College He was ordained in 1954 and served curacies in Edgware and Ipswich. He was Vicar of St Mary, Hornsey Rise from 1958 to 1962; Rector of Whitton from 1962 to 1975; and Rector of Redgrave cum Botesdale with The Rickinghalls from 1975 to 1979.

Smith retired to Stretton-on-Fosse, before moving to Shipston-on-Stour. He died on 22 August 2014, at the age of 88. His funeral was held on 5 September at Whitton Church, where he had previously served as rector.

Church of England titles
Preceded by Peter Hartley	Archdeacon of Suffolk; 1975–1984	Succeeded by Terry Gibson
Preceded by Kenneth Child	Archdeacon of Sudbury; 1984–1991	Succeeded by Richard Garrard
