= George Leman Tuthill =

English physician

Sir George Leman Tuthill (1772–1835) was an English medical doctor.

== Life ==
Born at Halesworth in Suffolk on 16 February 1772, he was the only son of John Tuthill, an attorney there, by his wife Sarah, only daughter of James Jermyn of the same town. He received his education at Bungay under Mr. Reeve, and on 3 June 1790 was admitted sizar at Caius College, Cambridge. He was scholar of the college from Michaelmas 1790 to Michaelmas 1796. He graduated B.A. in 1794, and was subsequently elected to present a university address to the king.

Visiting Paris with his wife, Tuthill was one of the British subjects detained by the French government because of the French Revolutionary Wars. After several years they were released when his wife appealed to the first consul. Tuthill then returned to Cambridge, proceeded M.A. in 1809, had a licence ad practicandum from the university dated 25 November 1812, and graduated M.D. in 1816. He was elected a fellow of the Royal Society in 1810, and was admitted an inceptor candidate of the Royal College of Physicians on 12 April 1813, a candidate on 30 September 1816, and a fellow on 30 September 1817.

Tuthill was Gulstonian lecturer in 1818, and censor in 1819 and 1830. He was knighted on 28 April 1820. He was physician to the Westminster Hospital and Bridewell and Bethlehem Hospitals, posts he held for the rest of his life. He was nominated to give the Harveian oration on 25 June 1835, but died first; that year, with Sir Henry Halford and William George Maton, he helped reform the Royal College of Physicians.

Tuthill purchased Cransford Hall of Cransford, Suffolk in 1832, upon his death the hall passed to his daughter Laurie Maria.

Tuthill died at his house in Cavendish Square, London on 7 April 1835, and was buried at St. Albans on the 14th of the same month. His library was sold by Sotheby's on 26 and 27 June 1835.

== Works ==
Tuthill was a member of the committee for the preparation of the Pharmacopœia Londinensis of 1824, and was responsible for the language of the work itself. He published an English version at the same time as the Latin original. He was also engaged on the Pharmacopœia of 1836, but died before it appeared. He wrote also Vindiciæ Medicæ, or a Defence of the College of Physicians, 1834.

== Family ==
Shortly after graduating, Tuthill married Maria, daughter of Richard Smith of Halesworth. There was a monument to his and his wife's memory at Cransford in Suffolk. He left an only daughter, Laura Maria, married to Thomas Borrett, a solicitor in London.

== Notes ==
Attribution

This article incorporates text from a publication now in the public domain: Lee, Sidney, ed. (1899). "Tuthill, George Leman". Dictionary of National Biography. Vol. 57. London: Smith, Elder & Co.
