= Churton Memorial Fountain =

The Churton Memorial Fountain
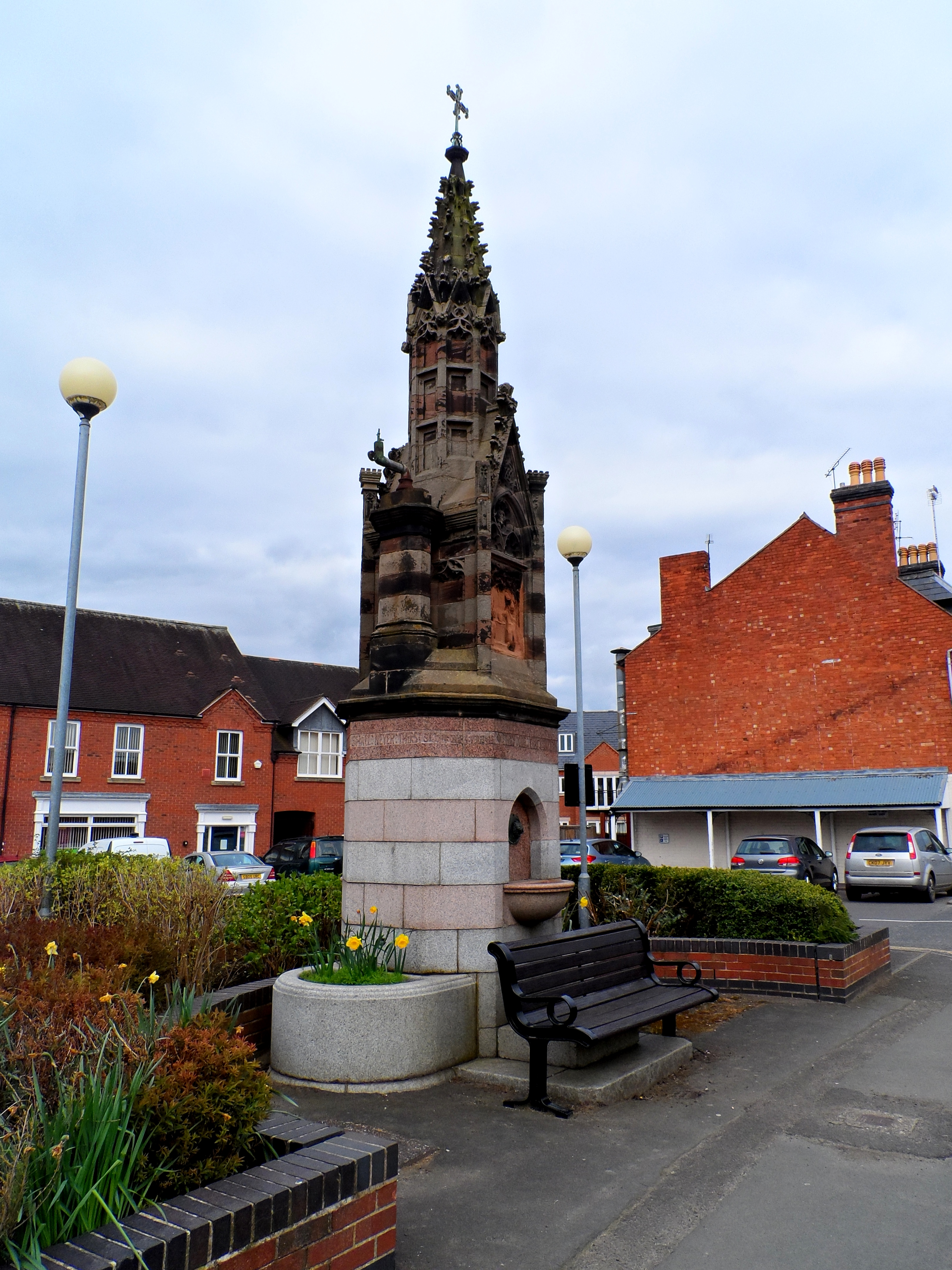
- Churton Memorial Fountain

- Location in Shropshire
- 52.969507°N 2.678776°W
- Location: Brownlow Street, Whitchurch, Shropshire, England
- OS grid reference: SJ 545 416

History
- Built: 1882
- Built for: John Churton

Site notes
- Architect: John Douglas
- Architectural style: Gothic Revival

Listed Building – Grade II
- Designated: 1 March 1988
- Reference no.: 1307452

The Churton Memorial Fountain stands on the west side of Brownlow Street, Whitchurch, Shropshire, England. It is recorded in the National Heritage List for England as a designated Grade II listed building.

== History ==
The fountain was built in 1882 by John Churton as a memorial to his parents and wife, and was designed by the Chester architect John Douglas. It was originally situated at the junctions of Brownlow Street, Green End, Talbot Street and Station Road. In the early 1930s it was moved to its present position further along Brownlow Street because it was interfering with traffic flow.

== Architecture ==
The memorial takes the form of a drinking fountain. On the front and back are copper spouts in the form of lions' heads, and at the sides are semicircular animal drinking troughs. It is constructed in stone and has an octagonal plan; it is in Gothic Revival style. The base is in granite with alternating pink and grey bands, while the upper parts are in sandstone ashlar with red and grey bands. At the front and back, above the spouts, are panels flanked by buttresses, surmounted by crocketted gables and finials. On each side are disused gas mantles. At the top is an octagonal pinnacle over which is a crocketted spire with a wrought iron cross finial. The memorial includes two inscriptions: one refers to the donor, while the other is taken from St John's Gospel.

== See also ==
- Listed buildings in Whitchurch Urban
- List of non-ecclesiastical and non-residential works by John Douglas
