= Peter Hartley (priest) =

Priest

Peter Harold Trahair Hartley (11 July 1909 – 3 February 1994) was Archdeacon of Suffolk from 1970 to 1975.

Hartley was educated at The Leys School, The Queen's College, Oxford and Ripon College Cuddesdon. He was ordained in 1954. He was a curate at Dennington then Badingham where he succeeded to the title of Rector. He also served at Bruisyard and, Cransford; and was Rural Dean of Loes from 1967 to 1970.

Church of England titles
Preceded by Claud Scott	Archdeacon of Suffolk; 1975–1984	Succeeded by Donald John Smith
