= Milden Thicks =

Protected area in Suffolk, England

Coordinates: 52.06°N 0.84°E

- Site of Special Scientific Interest
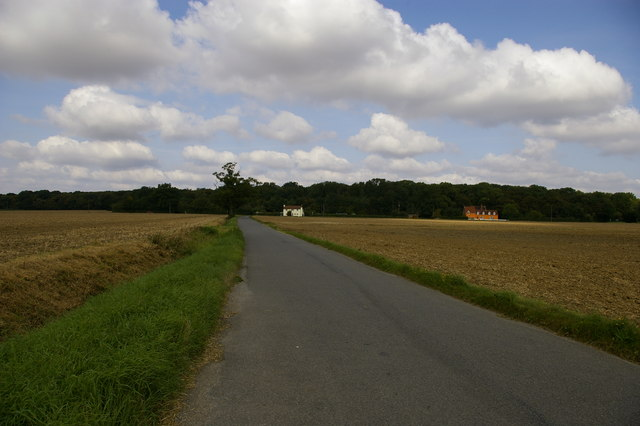
- View of Bulls Cross Wood
- Location of Milden Thicks.
- Area of search: Suffolk
- Grid reference: TL 951 444
- Interest: Biological
- Area: 42.3 hectares
- Notification date: 1986
- Location map: Magic Map

Milden Thicks is a 42.3-hectare (105-acre) biological Site of Special Scientific Interest east of Great Waldingfield in Suffolk, England. It is in four separate blocks, Bulls Cross Wood, Hazel Wood and the adjoining Hall Wood, Walding Wood and Long Wood.

These are diverse mature woods, described by Natural England as of national importance for the comparisons which can be made between them. There are several wild service trees, and the ground flora is rich and typical of ancient woodland.
