= Neil Robinson (priest) =

Neil Robinson (28 February 1929 – 4 October 2009) was a Church of England priest and Archdeacon of Suffolk from 1987 to 1994.

Robinson was educated at Penistone Grammar School and Durham University; and was ordained in 1954. After a curacy in Hull he was Vicar of South Wigston from 1958 to 1969. After this he was Rector and Rural Dean of Market Bosworth from 1969 to 1983; and a Residentiary Canon at Worcester Cathedral from 1983 until his appointment as Archdeacon.

Church of England titles
Preceded by Terry Gibson	Archdeacon of Suffolk; 1987–1994	Succeeded by Geoffrey Arrand
