= Archdeacon of Ipswich =

Church of England ecclesiastical office

The Archdeacon of Ipswich is a senior ecclesiastical officer within the Diocese of St Edmundsbury and Ipswich. As such, she or he is responsible for the disciplinary supervision of the clergy within its territory.

A few very early Archdeacons of Suffolk were called "Archdeacon of Ipswich". (These are listed at that article.)

The archdeaconry was created from the archdeaconries of Suffolk and of Sudbury by Order-in-Council under King George V on 22 December 1931. On its creation it consisted of the deaneries of Bosmere, Claydon, Hadleigh, Ipswich, North Hartismere, Samford, South Hartismere, and Stow. On Terry Gibson's retirement in 2005 the post was deliberately left vacant pending a pastoral scheme to dissolve the archdeaconry and divide its territory between Sudbury and Suffolk archdeaconries. The scheme could not go forward until the next diocesan bishop (Martin Seeley) was in post, but the area was subsequently under the care of the remaining two archdeacons. In autumn 2018, the archdeaconry was advertised, with a much smaller territory — only the Ipswich deanery — and a brief overseeing church plants and fresh expressions.

== List of archdeacons ==
- 1932–1945 (ret.): Eric Buckley (afterwards archdeacon emeritus)
- 1946–1963 (ret.): Thomas Browne (afterwards archdeacon emeritus)
- 1963–1976 (ret.): Charles Hooper (afterwards archdeacon emeritus)
- 1976–1986 (res.): Jeremy Walsh (afterwards Bishop suffragan of Tewkesbury)
- 1987 – January 2005 (ret.): Terry Gibson (afterwards archdeacon emeritus)

The post was vacant from 2005 to 2019, when it was re-created with different boundaries.

- 25 March 2019 – 18 October 2024 (res.): Rhiannon King (became Bishop of Southampton)
- 24 June 2025 – present: Sam Brazier-Gibbs
