= Henry Berners =

Henry Denny Berners (18 September 1769, London - 21 September 1852, Woolverstone) was Archdeacon of Suffolk from 1819 to 1846.

Berners was educated at St Mary Hall, Oxford. He was Rector of Erwarton from 1801 to 1835.
