= Charles Hooper (priest) =

English Anglican priest

Charles German Hooper (16 April 1911 – 22 March 1995) was Archdeacon of Ipswich from 1963 until 1976.

Hooper was educated at Lincoln College, Oxford; and ordained in 1935. His first post was a curacy at Corsham. After that he served at Claremont, Cape Town and then as a wartime chaplain with the RAFVR. He held incumbencies at Castle Combe, Sandy, Bishop's Stortford, Bildeston and Ipswich.

Church of England titles
Preceded by Thomas Browne	Archdeacon of Ipswich; 1963–1976	Succeeded by Jeremy Walsh
