= Roger de Beaufeu =

British judge

Roger De Beaufeu
- Other names: Bello Fago
- Known for: Judge

Roger de Beaufeu (fl. 1297–1308) also known as Bello Fago was an English judge, possibly of the same family as Nicholas de Beaufo of Beaufo's Manor, Norfolk, a contemporary of the judge.

== Name and records ==
One Radulphus de Bello Fago or Bella Fago (both genders are found, though the masculine predominates) is mentioned in the Domesday Book as holding extensive estates in Norfolk. The Bishop of Thetford is also mentioned there, which we know from other sources to have been William de Beaufo, called by Godwin inaccurately Galsagus [1 and by others still more corruptly Welson. It may be mentioned in passing that many other varieties of the name are found, such as Belfagus, Beaufou, Beaufogh, Beaufour, Belflour, Beufo, Beufew and in the eighteenth century, Beaufoy. How the Bishop of Thetford stood related to Radulphus de Bello Fago, we do not certainly know. Of Radulphus de Bello Fago little else is known, while of William, we know little more than the dates of his appointment to the see of Thetford and his death. Roger de Beaufo was a lineal descendant of either Ralph or William de Bello Fago, which cannot be affirmed. Nor can his relation to his contemporary Nicholas de Beaufo, of Beaufo's manor be precisely determined. We cannot connect him with Norfolk, all the estates which he is known to have possessed being situate in Berkshire and Oxfordshire. However, the singularity of the name renders it highly probable that he was derived from the same original stock as the Norfolk family.

The earliest mention of him occurs in the roll of parliament for 1305, when he was assigned with William de Mortimer and others as receiver of petitions from Ireland and Guernsey.

In the same year, he received, with the same William de Mortimer, a special commission to try an action of "novel disseisin," i.e., ejectment, brought by one John Pecche against the abbot of Westminster for the recovery of a mansion and one parcel of land in Warwickshire. From the writ, it appears that the ordinary justices itinerant for that county were behind with their business, and it would seem that Mortimer and Beaufo were appointed "justices of assize" for that occasion only. In the same year and the following, he traveled the large western circuit of that day, which stretched from Cornwall to Southampton in one direction and Staffordshire and Shropshire in another, as one of the first commissions of trailbaston issued for those counties. The popular odium to which he attracted attention and of which the memory is preserved by a line, "Spigurnel e Belflour sunt gens de cruelté", in a ballad of the time celebrating the doings of the commission, proves him to have displayed exceptional vigor in the performance of his duty. In a writ of uncertain date, he is joined with William de Bereford and two other judges in a commission to inquire into the obstruction of the Thames between London and Oxford by weirs, locks, and mills, which was considered such a serious grievance by the merchants who were in the habit of traveling or sending goods by water between the two towns that they had petitioned the king for its redress.

We find him summoned with the other judges to parliament at Northampton by Edward II in 1307 and to attend the coronation of that monarch in 1308. He was not summoned to Parliament after that year. He is classed as a tenant of land or rents to the value of £20 or upwards in Berkshire and Oxfordshire in a writ of summons to muster at London for service overseas issued in 1297; in 1301 he was included in the list of those summoned to attend the king at Berwick-on-Tweed with horses and arms for the invasion of Scotland as one of the contingents to be furnished by the counties of Bedford and Buckingham. From a grant enrolled in the King's Bench, we know that he possessed land at Great Multon, in Oxfordshire, and from the record of an assize of "novel disseisin" preserved in the rolls of the same court, it appears that his daughter Isabella acquired by marriage a title to an estate in Little Bereford in the same county, which a subsequent divorce and remarriage were held not to divest. Later on, one Humfrey Beaufo of Bereford St. John, Oxfordshire, is mentioned by Dugdale as having married Joan Hugford, and the manors of Edmondscote or Emscote in Warwickshire and Whilton in Northamptonshire passed into his family in the reign of Henry VII. From him descended the Beaufos, or Beaufoys, of Edmondscote and Whilton.

The manor of Whilton was sold in 1619 by the then lord, Henry Beaufo, mentioned by Dugdale as lord of the manor of Edmondscote in 1640. His daughter, Martha Beaufoy, married Sir Samuel Garth, the author of the "Dispensary", and their daughter Martha, who inherited the estates, married, in 1711, William Boyle, grandson of Roger, the first earl of Orrery.

== Attribution ==
- This article incorporates text from a publication now in the public domain: James McMullen Rigg (1885). "Beaufeu, Roger de". In Stephen, Leslie (ed.). Dictionary of National Biography. Vol. 04. London: Smith, Elder & Co. pp. 36–37. Endnotes:
  - Godwin, De Præsul. 426, 731
  - Dugdale's Monasticon, iii. 216
  - Blomefield's Norfolk, i. 200, 404, ii. 465
  - Rot. Parliamentary. i. 168 b, 218 b, 475 b
  - Rymer (ed. Clarke), i 970
  - Wright's Political Songs (Camden Society), 233
  - Parliamentary Writs, i. 155, 291, 353, 408, ii. div. ii. part i. 3, 17, 18, 21, 23
  - Plac. Abbrev. 214, 299
  - Dugdale's Ant. Warwickshire, 189
  - Baker's Hist. Northamptonshire, i. 232
  - Domesday Book, fols. 190 b-201 b, 225 b-229 b
  - Coll. Top. et Genesis viii. 361
  - Foss's Judges of England.
