= Archdeacon of Suffolk =

Church of England ecclesiastical office

The Archdeacon of Suffolk is a senior cleric in the Diocese of St Edmundsbury and Ipswich.

The archdeacon is responsible for the disciplinary supervision of the clergy in the territory of the archdeaconry.

== History ==
The archdeaconry of Sudbury separated from the archdeaconry of Suffolk in 1127. In 1256 it included thirteen deaneries which have since been subdivided, so that by 1911 it contained eighteen deaneries. Originally in the Dioceses of Norwich, and Rochester, the Suffolk archdeaconry was transferred to the Diocese of St Edmundsbury and Ipswich in 1914.

== List of archdeacons ==
=== High Medieval ===
From its erection, the archdeaconry was in Norwich diocese. For archdeacons of that diocese before territorial titles began, see Archdeacon of Norwich.

- bef. 1119–aft. 1135: Roger de Beaufeu
- bef. 1143–aft. 1186: Walkelin
- bef. 1193–aft. 1210: Geoffrey (also called Archdeacon of Ipswich)
- bef. 1214–aft. 1235: Robert de Tywa (also called Archdeacon of Ipswich)
- bef. 1240–aft. 1241: Alexander de Walpole
- 1242–aft. 1246: Roger Pincerna alias Le Boteler
- bef. 1249–aft. 1251: William de Horham
- bef. 1257–aft. 1258: William de Dunton
- bef. 1262–aft. 1267: John of Alvechurch
- ?–1282 (d.): Thomas Lenebaud
- bef. 1291–1296 (res.): Thomas de Skerning (became Archdeacon of Surrey)
- bef. 1298–bef. 1311: Sayerus (or Sacrus or Saer)

=== Late Medieval ===
- 10 January 1311–bef. 1324 (res.): Simon de Ely
- 28 March–April 1324 (res.): Alan de Ely
- 16 April 1224–bef. 1231 (res.): William de Knapton
- 31 March 1331–bef. 1347 (d.): John de Fenton
- 3–27 May 1347 (deprived): Richard Lyng (deprived)
- 27 May 1347–June 1353 (exch.): Michael Northburgh (later Bishop of London)
- June 1353–bef. 1357 (d.): William de Fieschi or de Flisco
- 1357 (d.): Francis de St Maximo
- 1357–bef. 1359 (res.): Hélie Cardinal de Talleyrand-Périgord (Cardinal Bishop of Albano)
- 5 June 1359–bef. 1363: John de Carleton (displaced)
- bef. 1363–21 July 1365 (exch.): William Graa de Trusthope
- 21 July 1365–bef. 1367 (d.): Carleton (again)
- 16 January 1367 – 20 January 1368 (deprived): John de Ufford (deprived)
- 20 January 1368–bef. 1373 (d.): John Aleyn
- 10 December 1373 – 1381 (deprived): John Clervaus
- bef. 1374–?: Guillaume Cardinal Noellet (Cardinal-deacon of Sant'Angelo in Pescheria)
- ?–25 August 1380 (d.): Eleazario Cardinal de Sabrano (Cardinal-priest of Santa Balbina)
- 4 August 1380 – 1381: Philippe Cardinal Valois d'Alençon (Cardinal Bishop of Sabina)
- bef. 1382–bef. 1383 (d.): John Clervaus (regained possession)
- 2 September–October/November 1383 (deprived): William de Malebys
- 1 April 1384–bef. 1387: Thomas de Shirford
- 28 May–8 July 1387 (exch.): Henry Sturdy
- 8 July 1387 – 1 July 1390 (exch.): Robert Foulmere
- 1 July 1390–bef. 1421 (d.): John Thorpe
- 10 November 1421–bef. 1441 (d.): John Franks
- ?–1448 (res.): Richard Beauchamp (became Bishop of Hereford)
- 14 March 1449–bef. 1472 (d.): Henry Trevilian
- 2 March 1472–April 1497 (d.): William Pykenham
- 20 April 1487 – 1505 (d.): Nicholas Goldwell
- ?–bef. 1526 (res.): John Dolman
- 12 November 1526 – 1528: Thomas Wynter (also Dean of Wells, Archdeacon of York and Archdeacon of Richmond; became Archdeacon of Norfolk)
- 1524-1526, 1528-1529 (res.): Edmund Steward
- 11 January 1529 – 1536 (res.): Richard Sampson (became Bishop of Chichester)
- 1 November 1536 – 1539 (res.): John Skypp (became Bishop of Hereford)
- 27 August 1540–bef. 1542: William Ryvell

=== Early modern ===
- 8 February 1542–bef. 1548 (d.): Elizeus Ferreys
- 20 August 1548–bef. 1559 (d.): Robert Rugge
- 17 April 1559 – 1576 (deprived): Nicholas Wendon (fled overseas and deprived)
- 10 November 1576 – 1613 (d.): John Maplesden
- 6 October 1613–bef. 1640 (d.): Robert Pearson
- 1 February–November 1640 (d.): Robert Bostock
- 27 November 1640–bef. 1660 (deprived): Richard Mileson (deprived)
- 18 September 1660 – 1683 (res.): Laurence Womack (became Bishop of St David's)
- 3 January 1684–bef. 1687 (d.): Godfrey King
- 1 October 1687–bef. 1688 (res.): John Battely (became Archdeacon of Canterbury)
- 20 December 1688 – 1 November 1724 (d.): Humphrey Prideaux (also Dean of Norwich from 1702)
- 19 December 1724 – 6 September 1745 (d.): David Wilkins
- 19 September 1745 – 5 January 1748 (d.): Richard Warren
- 19 February 1748 – 23 February 1781 (d.): Henry Goodall
- 5 March 1781 – 17 December 1818 (d.): John Strachey
- 27 February 1819–bef. 1846 (res.): Henry Berners
- 12 January 1846–bef. 1868 (res.): Thomas Ormerod

=== Late modern ===
- May 1868–March 1869 (res.): Vincent Ryan, assistant bishop (later Archdeacon of Craven)
- March 1869–1887 (res.): Robert Groome, Rector of Monk Soham
- 1887–22 April 1892 (d.): Joseph Woolley, Rector of East Bergholt
- May 1892–1901 (res.): Richard Gibson, Rector of Lound
- 1901–1917 (ret.): Charles Lawrence
- February 1917–14 September 1919 (d.): William Everingham
- 1919–24 July 1938 (d.): James Darling, Rector of Eyke &c.
- 1938–1947 (ret.): Thomas Wonnacott, Rector of Stonham Aspal (afterwards archdeacon emeritus)
- 1947–September 1961 (ret.): Christopher George, Rector of Sproughton (afterwards archdeacon emeritus)
- 1962–1970 (ret.): Claud Scott, Vicar of Hoxne &c. (afterwards archdeacon emeritus)
- 1970–1975 (res.): Peter Hartley, Rector of Badingham &c. (afterwards archdeacon emeritus)
- 1975–1984 (res.): Donald Smith, Rector of Redgrave cum Botesdale &c. (until 1979; became Archdeacon of Sudbury)
- 1984–1987 (res.): Terry Gibson (became Archdeacon of Ipswich)
- 1987–30 March 1994 (ret.): Neil Robinson
- 1994–2009 (ret.): Geoffrey Arrand (afterwards archdeacon emeritus)
- 2009–2012 (res.): Judy Hunt
- 6 September 2012 – 3 October 2019 (d.): Ian Morgan
- 18 January 2020 – 25 April 2023 (ret.): Jeanette Gosney (previously Acting since May 2019)
- 14 May 2023 – present: Rich Henderson

== Sources ==
- Greenway, Diana E. (1971), Fasti Ecclesiae Anglicanae 1066–1300, vol. 2, pp. 67–69
- Jones, B. (1963), Fasti Ecclesiae Anglicanae 1300–1541, vol. 4, pp. 32–34
- Horn, Joyce M. (1992), Fasti Ecclesiae Anglicanae 1541–1857, vol. 7, pp. 48–49
