= Jeanette Gosney =

British Anglican priest

Jeanette Margaret Gosney (born 1958) is a British retired Anglican priest. She served as Archdeacon of Suffolk in the Diocese of St Edmundsbury and Ipswich from 2020 until her 2023 retirement. She was previously a chaplain, theological college tutor, and in parish ministry.

== Ordained ministry ==
Gosney was ordained in the Church of England as a deacon in 1995 and as a priest in 1996. She served her curacy at St Margaret's Church, Ipswich between 1995 and 1998. She then joined the Loughborough University where she was a chaplain in 1998 and senior chaplain from 1998 to 2001. She moved into teaching, working as tutor in practical theology at Trinity College, Bristol, an evangelical Anglican theological college, between 2001 and 2004. From 2004 to 2005, she was chaplain of Repton School, a private boarding school in Derbyshire. In November 2006, she returned to parish ministry, having been appointed team vicar of a rural benefice in the Diocese of St Albans.

She was collated as archdeacon on 18 January 2020 during a service at St Michael's Church, Framlingham, and then installed as a canon of St Edmundsbury Cathedral on 2 February 2020. She retired effective 25 April 2023.

== Selected works ==
- Gosney, Jeanette (2002). Surviving child sexual abuse: supporting adults in the church. Cambridge: Grove Books. ISBN 978-1851745081.
