= James Norton (actor) =

English actor (born 1985)

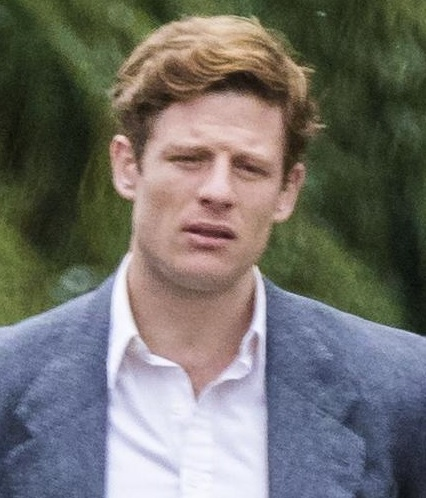
- James Norton filming Grantchester on Clare College Bridge, Cambridge in 2015
- Born: James Geoffrey Ian Norton; 18 July 1985 (age 41); London, England, U.K.
- Education: Ampleforth College
- Alma mater: University of Cambridge (BA)
- Occupation: Actor
- Years active: 2007–present
- Relatives: Hugh Norton (great-grandfather)

James Geoffrey Ian Norton (born 18 July 1985) is an English actor. He is known for roles in the television series Happy Valley (2014–2023), Grantchester (2014–2019), War & Peace (2016), and McMafia (2018). He played the title role in the 2019 film Mr. Jones and played King Harold Godwinson in the 2025 BBC historical mini-series King & Conqueror. He earned a nomination for Best Supporting Actor at the British Academy Television Awards in 2015 for his performance as Tommy Lee Royce in Happy Valley. He is also part of the main cast of House of Guinness (2025) and House of the Dragon (2026).

== Early life and education ==
James Geoffrey Ian Norton was born on 18 July 1985 in South London. He has a younger sister who is a doctor. His parents married in Aylesbury, Buckinghamshire, in 1982 and were both teachers. His father, who was born in Tanzania, was a lecturer at Hull School of Art and Design. Though originally from London, Norton's family lived in the town of Malton in the Ryedale district of North Yorkshire. Norton, who grew up at the edge of the Howardian Hills in North Yorkshire, has described his childhood as "idyllic". His grandfather, Ian Norton, a colonial official in Tanganyika, was son of Hugh Ross Norton, Archdeacon of Sudbury from 1945 to 1962. His paternal grandmother, Jean, was daughter of Colonel Francis John Biddulph, of the Royal Engineers. The Biddulphs were a branch of an Irish landed gentry family. Through the Biddulph family, he is a descendant of the Van Cortlandt family of New York.

Norton was educated at Bramcote Prep School (Scarborough College) in Scarborough until the age of 13 and Ampleforth College, an independent Roman Catholic (Benedictine) boarding school in the village of Ampleforth in North Yorkshire. He did work experience at the Stephen Joseph Theatre in Scarborough when he was 15.

Starting in 2004, Norton read theology at Fitzwilliam College of the University of Cambridge, graduating in 2007 with First Class Honours. Norton received a Fitzwilliam Travel Grant to travel to Northern India, to teach and perform for schoolchildren at 16 schools. His studies were principally focused on Hinduism and Buddhism. Norton was a member of The Marlowe Society theatre club at Cambridge. In 2007 he played Posthumus in a production of Cymbeline directed by Trevor Nunn for the society's centenary, and performed in many other theatre productions while at university.

After completing his degree, Norton attended the Royal Academy of Dramatic Art (RADA) in London for three years, but left in 2010 six months before graduation to take an acting assignment.

== Career ==
Norton appeared as a classmate of Jenn in the film An Education, starring Carey Mulligan, in 2009. In 2010 he was an original cast member of Posh at the Royal Court Theatre. At the Crucible Theatre in Sheffield in 2010, Norton starred in That Face as Henry, an 18-year-old who has dropped out of school to care for his mentally disturbed and drug-dependent mother, played by Frances Barber. Lynne Walker of The Independent wrote of his performance: "At the centre of it all is Henry who, in James Norton's striking portrayal, is like a young caged animal." In 2011, Norton starred as Captain Stanhope in the First World War drama Journey's End. The production toured the UK from March to June and transferred to the Duke of York's Theatre in the West End from July to September. Norton then took the role of Geoffrey in The Lion in Winter at the Theatre Royal, Haymarket directed by Trevor Nunn, with whom Norton had worked at Cambridge in Cymbeline.

In the 2012 film Cheerful Weather for the Wedding, Norton played Owen, the would-be groom of a conflicted bride. He appeared in the 2013 film Rush as Formula One driver Guy Edwards. In the 2013 film Belle, he played a suitor of the title character, a mixed-race woman in 18th-century English society. Norton's television appearances include the Doctor Who episode "Cold War", in which he played a crewman on a Soviet submarine during the Cold War, and Death Comes to Pemberley, based on the P. D. James novel involving characters from Jane Austen's Pride and Prejudice caught up in a murder mystery. Norton was acclaimed for his role as Tommy Lee Royce, the villain of the hit crime drama Happy Valley. Michael Hogan of The Telegraph wrote: "... the breakout star, seen in only a few small parts before this, has been the devilishly handsome James Norton, 29, as the heinous killer Royce, whom he has played with impressive depth." As the first series came to its dramatic conclusion, Norton commented, "8 million people are currently wishing me dead." Norton confirmed he would be appearing in the second series of Happy Valley at the 2015 BAFTAs and continued in the role in the third series.

From 2014 to 2018 Norton played crime-solving vicar Sidney Chambers alongside Robson Green as Police Inspector Geordie Keating in the ITV series Grantchester, based on the stories by James Runcie. Grantchester was his first starring role. A second series was broadcast in early 2016. A third series went into production in autumn 2016, and aired in both the UK and the U.S. in late spring and early summer 2017. A fourth series began filming in June 2018, and it was confirmed that this would be Norton's final series.

He also appeared in the 2014 films Northmen: A Viking Saga and Mr. Turner, a biographical drama on the life of the artist J. M. W. Turner by director Mike Leigh. In 2015 Norton played Duncan Grant in the BBC Two mini-series about the Bloomsbury Group, Life in Squares. In 2016, Norton appeared as Prince Andrei Bolkonsky in the BBC miniseries of Andrew Davies's production of War & Peace. The mini-series, a co-production with The Weinstein Company, allowed the cast to film in Russia.

Between March and May 2016 Norton appeared in Tracy Letts's Bug in London's West End. In 2016, he appeared in "Nosedive", an episode of the anthology series Black Mirror. Between December 2017 and February 2018 he appeared in Amy Herzog’s Belleville at the Donmar Warehouse Theatre. As part of his preparation for his role in McMafia, Norton studied the Russian martial art and health system Systema. In 2019, Norton portrayed John Brooke in Greta Gerwig's film adaptation of Louisa May Alcott's novel Little Women. He was ranked 31 on the Radio Times's TV 100 power list in 2024.

Norton served as executive producer on the BBC historical drama King & Conqueror, where he played Harold Godwinson. The series is produced by Norton's production company and aired on BBC in August 2025. He also starred in the Netflix series House of Guinness, about the family who created the famed Irish stout. Norton was cast as band manager Brian Epstein in The Beatles – A Four-Film Cinematic Event, to be directed by Sam Mendes and slated for release in April 2028.

== Personal life ==
Norton was raised in a devout Catholic family, although he has been practising Buddhism for many years. He has type 1 diabetes. Between 2015 and 2017, he was in a relationship with actress Jessie Buckley. From 2018 to 2023, he was in a relationship with actress Imogen Poots, to whom he was engaged from 2022 until their breakup.

=== Philanthropy and politics ===
In 2015, Norton became a trustee of the Royal Theatrical Support Trust. He opposed Brexit and signed a petition to have Article 50 revoked and for the UK to remain in the European Union. Norton presented a short film for the Climate Coalition's 2019 Show the Love campaign, calling upon humanity to tackle climate change, and signed a letter with other public figures that summer urging the government to take action. On a 2023 podcast, Norton voiced his disagreement with then prime minister Rishi Sunak's plans to make mathematics a school requirement through A Levels, suggesting pupils should still be allowed to focus on the arts and humanities if they choose to. Through a ticketed charity event in March 2025, Norton raised over £18,000 for St Leonard's Hospice in York near his hometown. In response to the April 2025 Supreme Court ruling on the definition of woman in the Equality Act and subsequent EHRC guidance, Norton was one of over 400 film and television professionals to sign an open letter pledging "solidarity with the trans, non-binary and intersex communities" and condemning both actions.

== Filmography ==
=== Film ===
| Year | Title | Role | Notes |
|---|---|---|---|
| 2009 | An Education | Student | |
| 2012 | Cheerful Weather for the Wedding | Owen | |
| 2013 | Rush | Guy Edwards | |
| 2013 | Belle | Oliver Ashford | |
| 2014 | Mr. Turner | Francis Willoughby | |
| 2014 | Bonobo | Ralph | |
| 2014 | Northmen: A Viking Saga | Bjorn | |
| 2017 | Hampstead | Philip | |
| 2017 | Flatliners | Jamie | |
| 2019 | Mr Jones | Gareth Jones | |
| 2019 | Little Women | John Brooke | |
| 2020 | Nowhere Special | John | |
| 2021 | Things Heard & Seen | George Claire | |
| 2022 | Rogue Agent | Robert Hendy-Freegard | |
| 2023 | Ex-Husbands | Nick Pearce | |
| 2023 | A Little Life | Jude St. Francis | Recording of West End production |
| 2024 | Bob Marley: One Love | Christopher Blackwell | |
| 2024 | Joy | Robert Edwards | |
| 2026 | Sunny Dancer | Bob | |
| 2027 | Wife & Dog † | | Post-production |
| 2028 | The Beatles – A Four-Film Cinematic Event † | Brian Epstein | Filming |

=== Television ===
| Year | Title | Role | Notes |
|---|---|---|---|
| 2012 | Inspector George Gently | James Blackstone | Episode: "Gently with Class" |
| 2012 | Restless | Kolia | Miniseries |
| 2013 | Blandings | Jimmy Belford | Episode: "Pig-hoo-o-o-o-ey" |
| 2013 | Doctor Who | Onegin | Episode: "Cold War" |
| 2013 | By Any Means | Michael Prence | Episode: "Episode 1" |
| 2013 | Death Comes to Pemberley | Henry Alveston | 3 episodes |
| 2014–2019 | Grantchester | Sidney Chambers | Main role |
| 2014–2023 | Happy Valley | Tommy Lee Royce | Main role |
| 2015 | Life in Squares | Young Duncan Grant | 3 episodes |
| 2015 | Lady Chatterley's Lover | Sir Clifford Chatterley | Television film |
| 2016 | War & Peace | Prince Andrei Bolkonsky | Main role |
| 2016 | Black Mirror | Ryan | Episode: "Nosedive" |
| 2016 | To Walk Invisible | Duke of Wellington | Television film |
| 2016 | Wild West: America's Great Frontier | Narrator | 3 episodes |
| 2018 | McMafia | Alex Godman | Main role |
| 2019–2020 | The Trial of Christine Keeler | Stephen Ward | Miniseries |
| 2021–2023 | The Nevers | Hugo Swan | Main role |
| 2025 | Playing Nice | Pete | ITV1 drama; 4 episodes |
| 2025 | King & Conqueror | Harold Godwinson | Main role |
| 2025 | House of Guinness | Sean Rafferty | Main role |
| 2026 | House of the Dragon | Ormund Hightower | Main role; 7 episodes |
| 2026 | Saturday Night Live UK | Himself/Host | Episode: "2x05" |

=== Video games ===
| Year | Title | Role | Notes |
|---|---|---|---|
| 2014 | Dragon Age: Inquisition | Cole | Voice |

=== Music videos ===
| Year | Title | Artist | Role |
|---|---|---|---|
| 2026 | "Ride" | Jessie Ware | Love interest |

== Theatre ==
| Year | Title | Role | Notes |
|---|---|---|---|
| 2007 | Cymbeline | Posthumus | Cambridge Arts Theatre (1–6 October 2007) |
| 2010 | Posh | Miles Richards | Royal Court Theatre, London (9 April – 22 May 2010) |
| 2010 | That Face | Henry | Crucible Theatre, Sheffield (7–24 July 2010) |
| 2011 | Journey's End | Captain Stanhope | UK national tour (March–June 2011); Duke of York's Theatre, London (19 July – 3 September 2011) |
| 2011–2012 | The Lion in Winter | Geoffrey | Theatre Royal Haymarket, London (5 November 2011 – 28 January 2012) |
| 2016 | Bug | Peter | Found111, London (24 March – 14 May 2016) |
| 2017–2018 | Belleville | Zack | Donmar Warehouse, London (7 December 2017 – 3 February 2018) |
| 2023 | A Little Life | Jude St Francis | Richmond Theatre, Harold Pinter Theatre and Savoy Theatre, London |
| 2027 | Hamlet † | Hamlet | TBA |

== Awards and nominations ==
| Year | Award | Category | Nominated work | Result | Ref. |
|---|---|---|---|---|---|
| 2014 | Crime Thriller Awards | Best Supporting Actor | Happy Valley | Won | |
| 2015 | British Academy Television Awards | Best Supporting Actor | Happy Valley | Nominated | |
| 2021 | British Independent Film Awards | Best Actor | Nowhere Special | Nominated | |
| 2024 | WhatsOnStage Awards | Best Performer in a Play | A Little Life | Won | |
| 2024 | Laurence Olivier Awards | Best Actor | A Little Life | Nominated | |
| 2026 | British Independent Film Awards | Best Ensemble Performance | Sunny Dancer | Pending | |
