= The Backs =

Area in Cambridge, England

Coordinates: 52.20437°N 0.11404°E

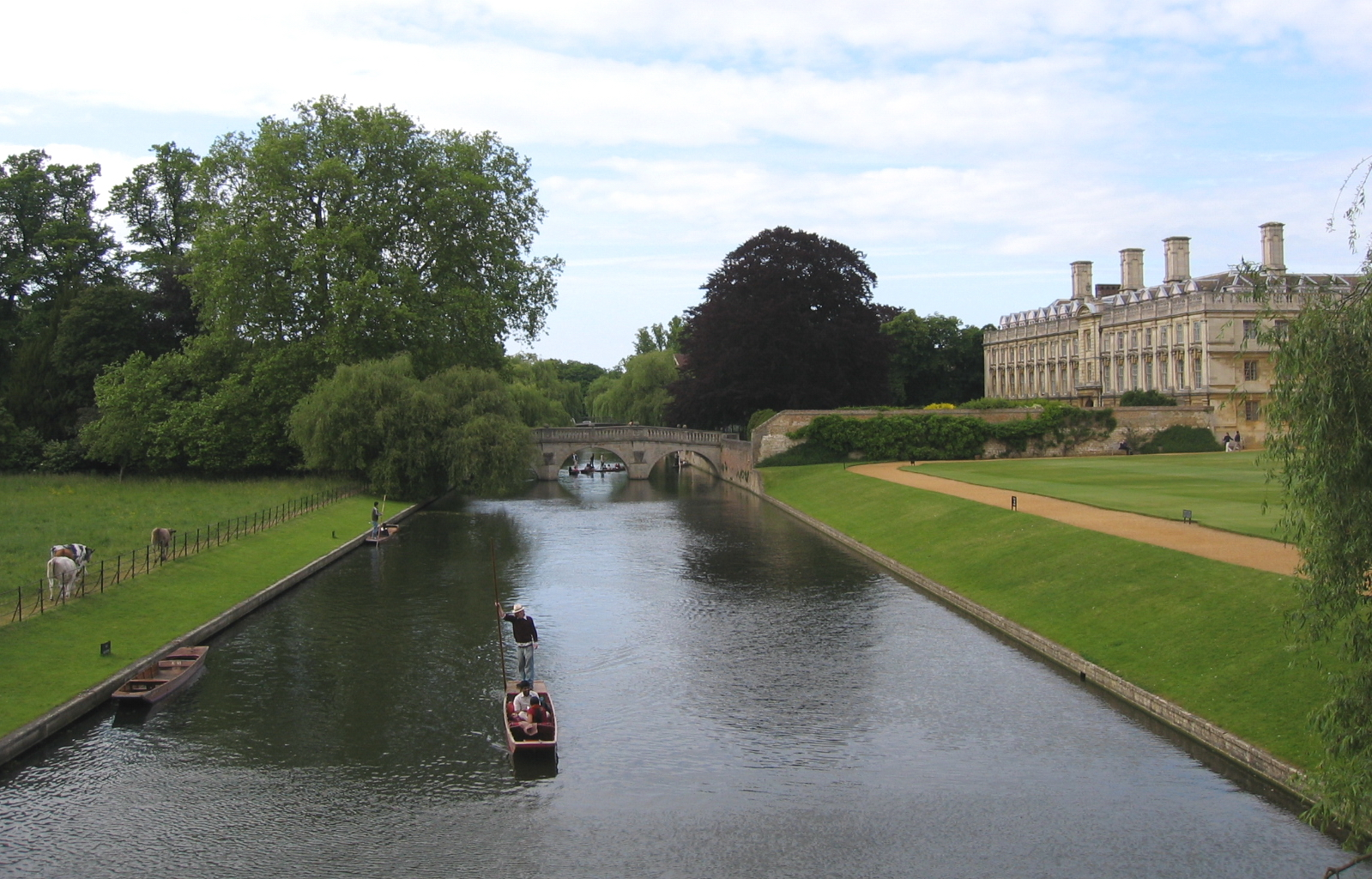
Part of The Backs at the University of Cambridge showing Clare College, Clare Bridge, and the back lawns of King's College

The Backs is an area to the east of Queen's Road in the city of Cambridge, England, where several colleges of the University of Cambridge back on to the River Cam with their grounds covering both banks of the river.

In 2013, National Trust chairman Simon Jenkins included The Backs as one of his top ten views in England.

== The name ==
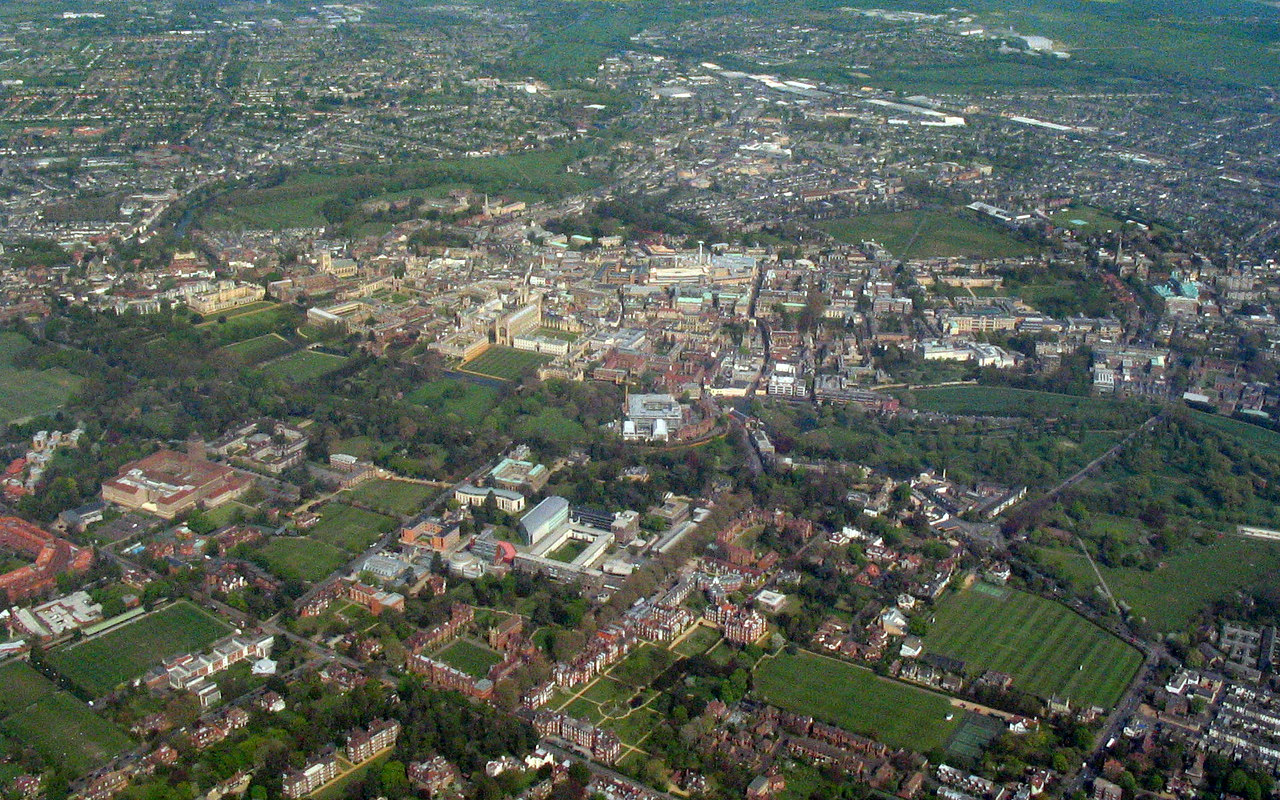
The Backs appear as the horizontal green band in the middle left of this aerial photograph of Cambridge.

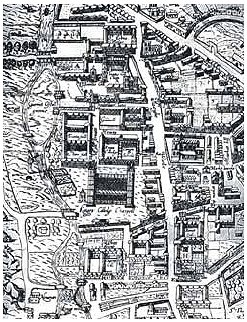
One of the earliest drawings of The Backs, included in a University of Cambridge plan engraved by Richard Lyne in 1574

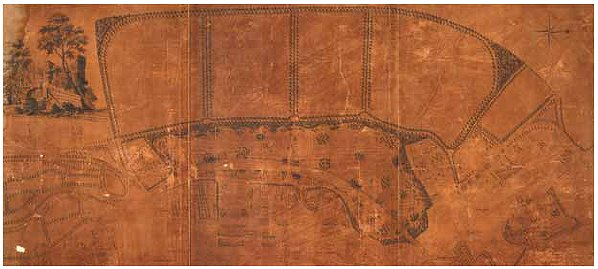
A Plan Presented to the University of Cambridge for Some Alterations by Lancelot Brown, 1779

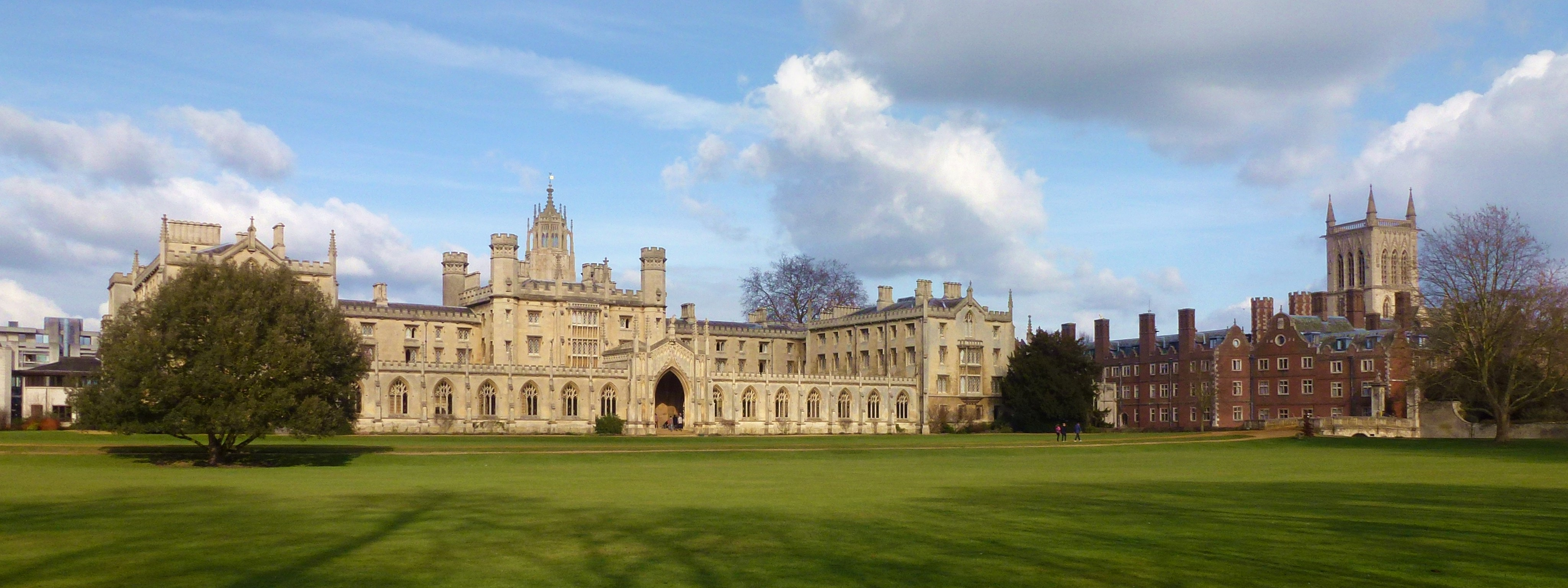
St John's College's New Court (left) was the first major college building built on the west side of the River Cam.

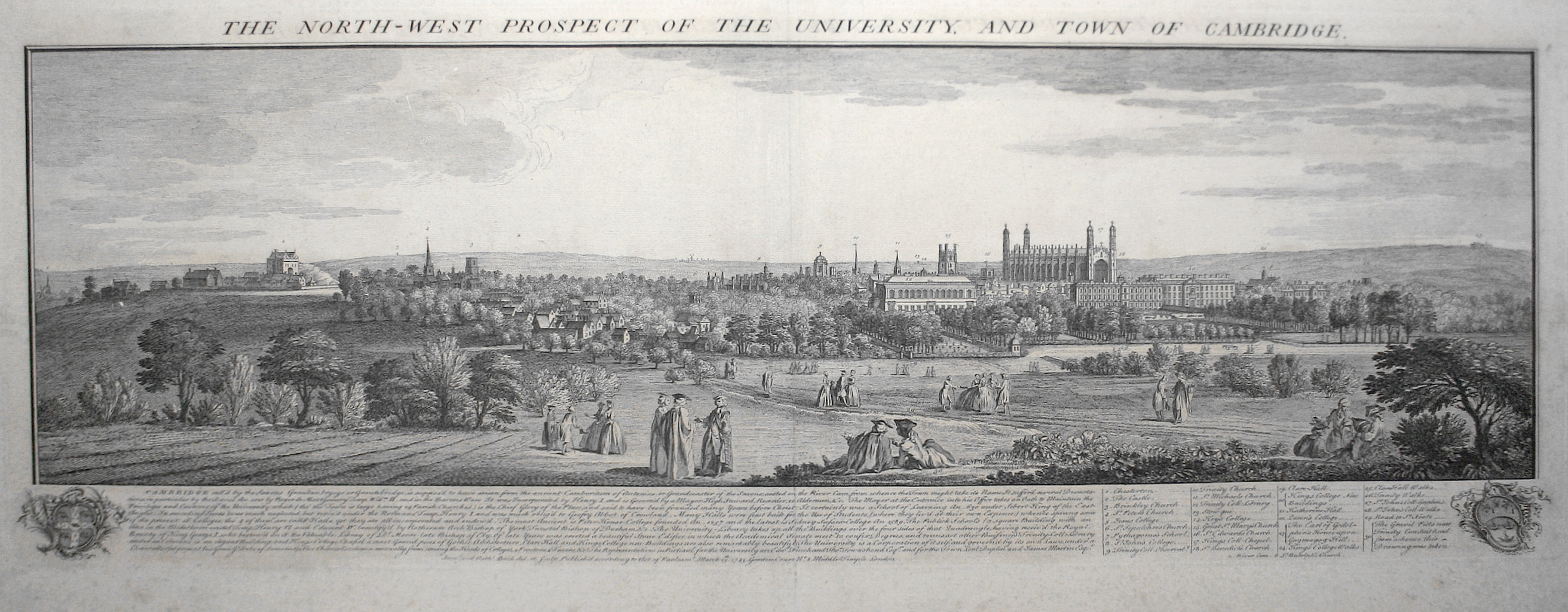
A 1743 engraving of The Backs and Cambridge skyline

The Backs refers to the colleges' backs. The region is made up of the following colleges' back grounds (from north to south):

- St John's – buildings on both sides of the river, spanned by the St John's Kitchen Bridge and the Bridge of Sighs
- Trinity – buildings on the east bank, spanned by Trinity College Bridge.
- Trinity Hall – buildings on the east bank but with no rear grounds on the west bank.
- Clare – buildings on the east bank, spanned by Clare Bridge.
- King's – buildings on the east bank, spanned by King's Bridge.
- Queens' – buildings on both sides of the river, spanned by the Mathematical Bridge.

Sometimes included in The Backs are the following colleges:

- Magdalene – grounds on the west bank just south of the Magdalene Street Bridge.
- Darwin – just beyond Silver Street at the southern end of The Backs.
- Jesus – just beyond the northern end of The Backs, behind Jesus Green.

Historically, much of the land was used by the colleges for grazing livestock or growing fruit. Cattle can still be found grazing behind King's College. The river was also an important commercial thoroughfare to the mill at Silver Street.

== History ==
In the 16th century, the area consisted of pasture, gardens and orchards owned by colleges of the University, with wooden bridges across the River Cam. The colleges ultimately planted avenues of trees and built sturdier bridges. In 1772, St John's College consulted English landscape architect Lancelot ("Capability") Brown (1716–1783), who laid out a "wilderness" on the college side of Queen's Road which still exists today.

In 1779, Brown presented a plan to the University of Cambridge to create country-house style parkland with its focus on King's College's Gibbs Building. The plan would have involved removing avenues, transforming the river into a lake, and planting clumps of trees to screen the other colleges. It was never implemented, possibly because it would have removed historic college boundaries and three important bridges.

In response to many elm trees succumbing to Dutch elm disease, a Backs Committee was formed in 1979 so that a joint approach could be taken to the problem facing The Backs. As a result of the committee's work, trees were cut down and new ones planted in their place. However, the committee stopped meeting in 1994.

In 1995, English Heritage listed The Backs as a Grade 1 Historic Park.

== Present-day and future development ==
In the 2000s, six University of Cambridge colleges on The Backs commissioned Robert Myers, a landscape architect who had studied at Girton College, to prepare a new landscape management plan for the area. The report, entitled The Backs Cambridge Landscape Strategy, was completed in November 2007 and released on 1 December 2007. It sets out proposals for the evolution of The Backs over the next 50 years. Myers' proposal is to improve the "legibility, coherence and visual quality of the landscape as a whole" by retaining and enhancing the existing structure of the landscape and sight lines, while screening off the traffic on Queens Road. Over-mature and inappropriately-sited trees will be removed and new ones planted. In addition, there will be a phased replacement of avenues, an extension of the "wilderness" planting behind St John's and along the edge of Queens Road, and the creation of a "wildlife corridor". In particular, as regards Queens' Green at the southern end of The Backs, which is owned by Cambridge City Council, there is a proposal to extend an existing avenue of beech trees to the Queens Road to create an additional "rung" to the "ladder effect" created by other tree avenues, and to plant more trees and wilderness to partly enclose a stretch of grass.

The colleges are currently in consultation with the City Council and English Heritage regarding the report, and if it is approved will carry out the suggested work in their own time using their own funds.

In December 2007, The Daily Telegraph reported that "there has been a remarkable degree of consensus between institutions [i.e., the colleges of the University owning parts of The Backs] well known for prizing their autonomy".

== Gallery ==
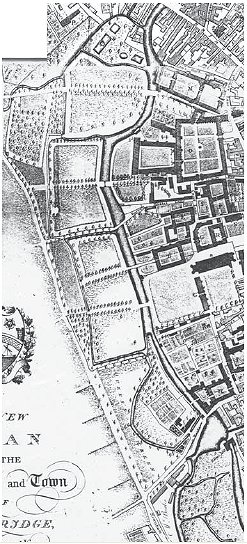
Detail of a 1798 map surveyed by William Custance and engraved by J. Russell showing The Backs

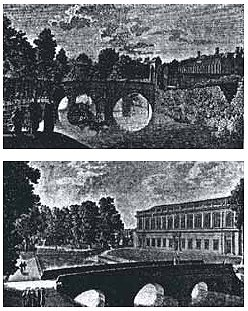
Spendlowe Lamborn's late-18th-century engravings of the Old Bridge at King's College and Trinity College Bridge

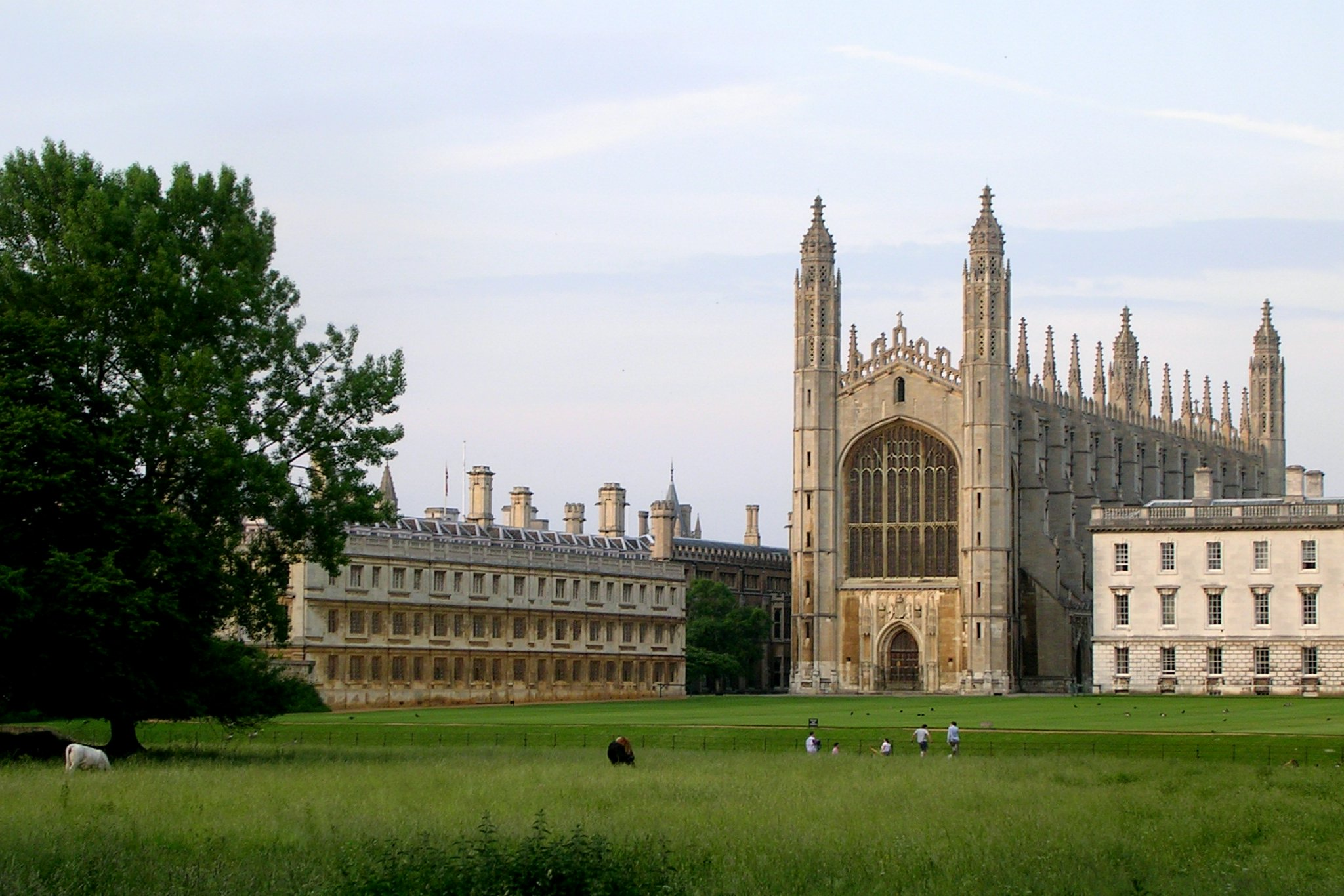
King's College Chapel from The Backs

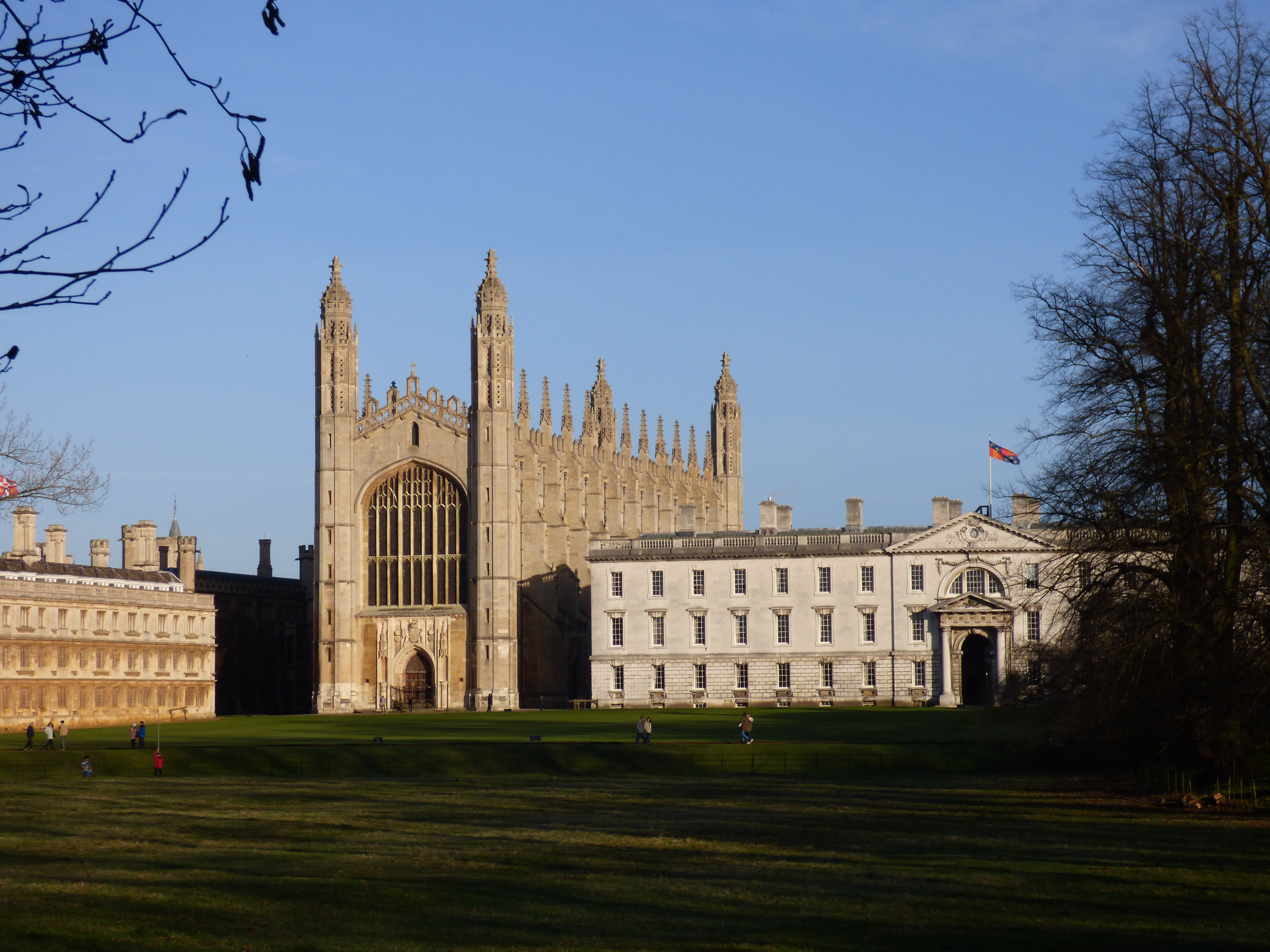
King's College Chapel viewed from the Backs

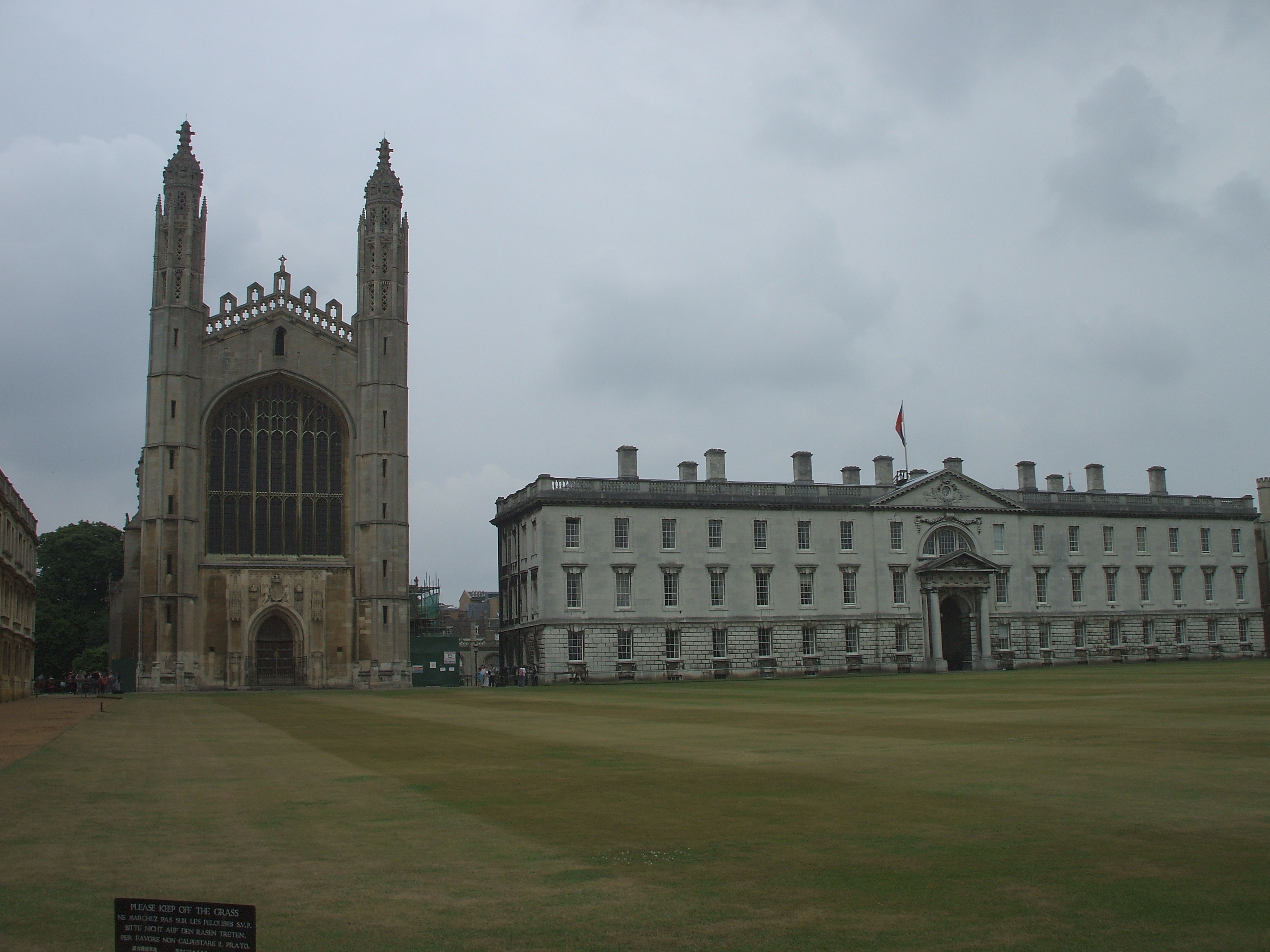
King's College Chapel and the Gibbs Building (King's College) from the Backs

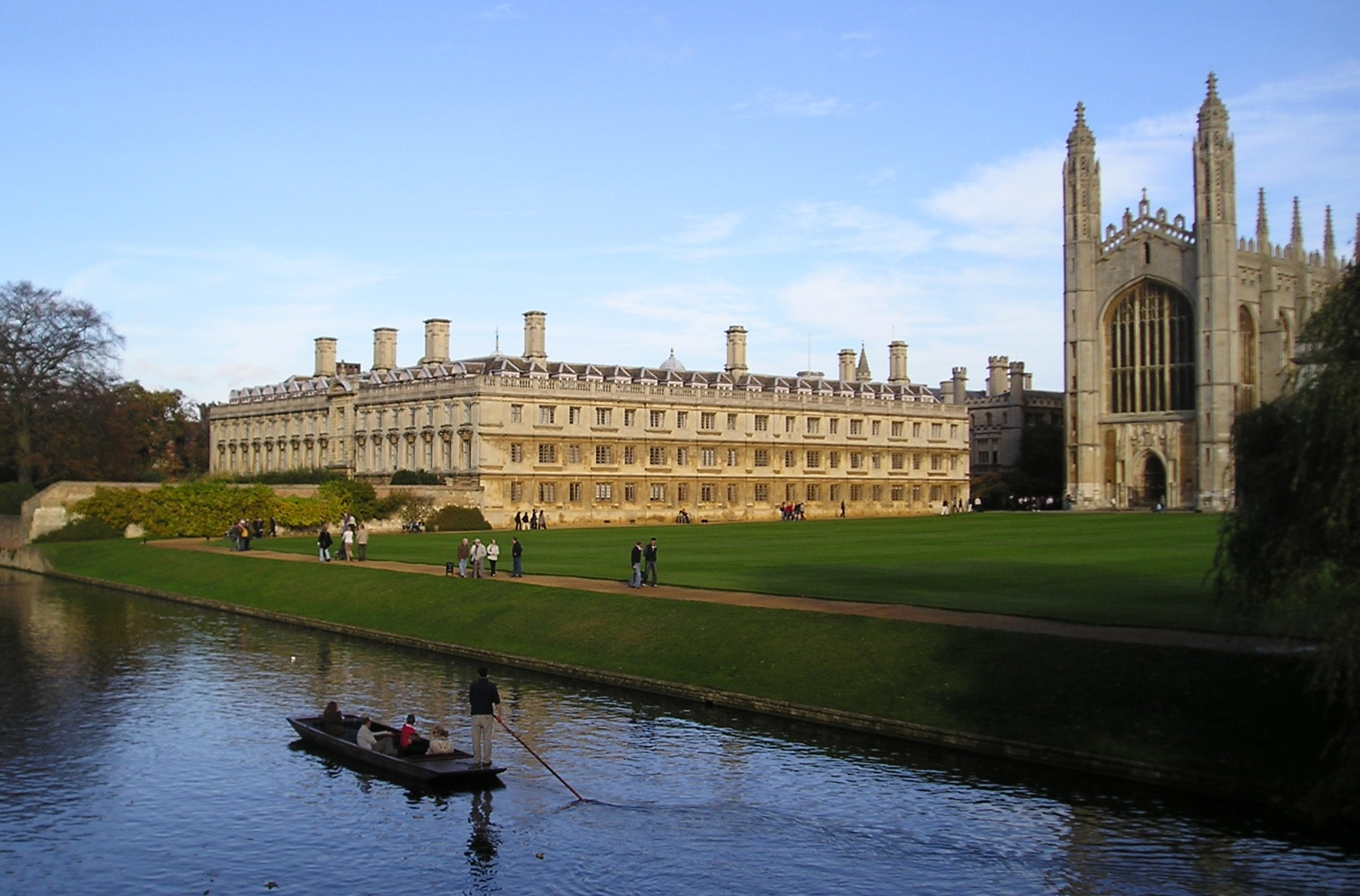
Clare College and King's College Chapel from The Backs

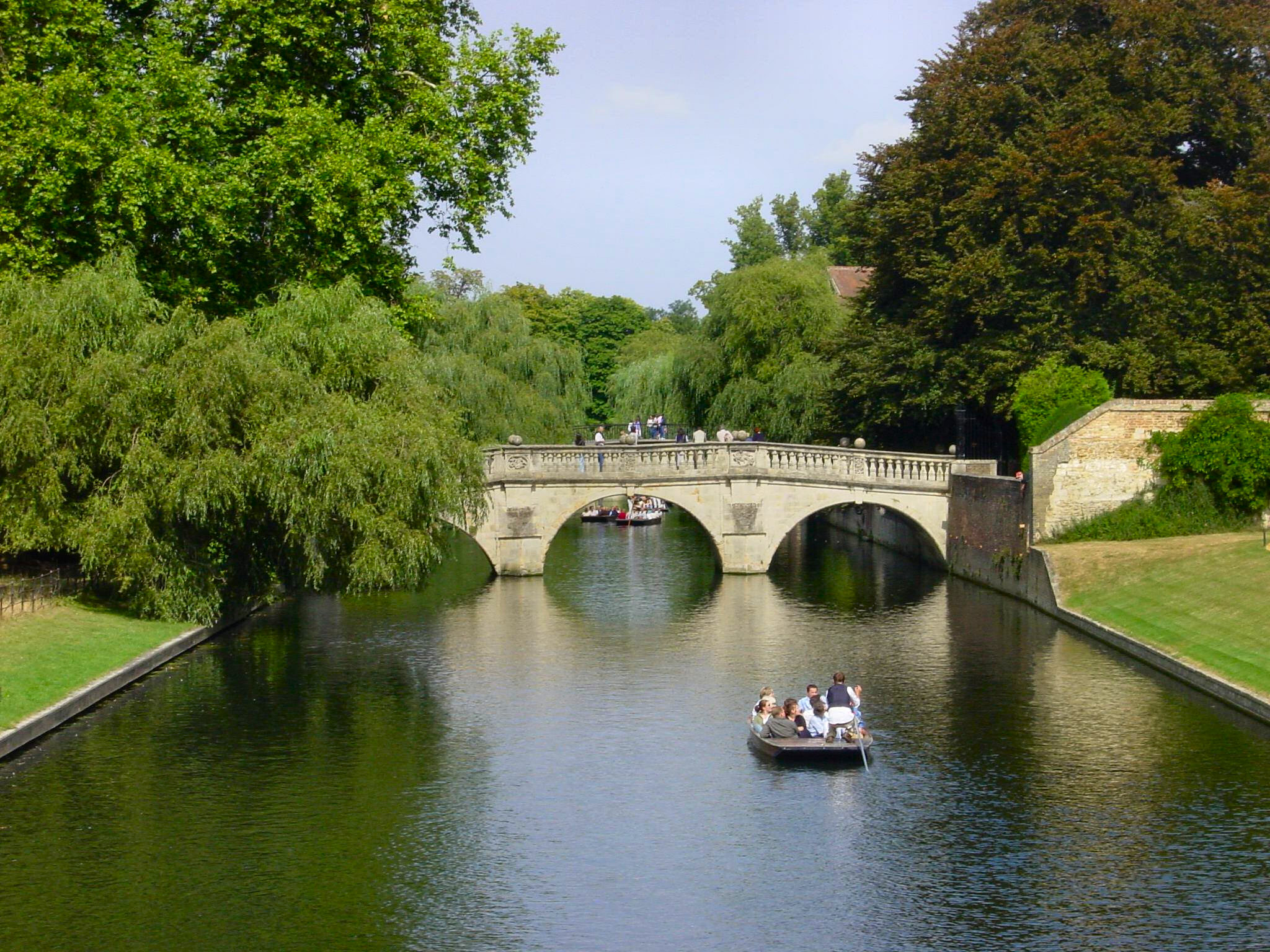
Clare Bridge

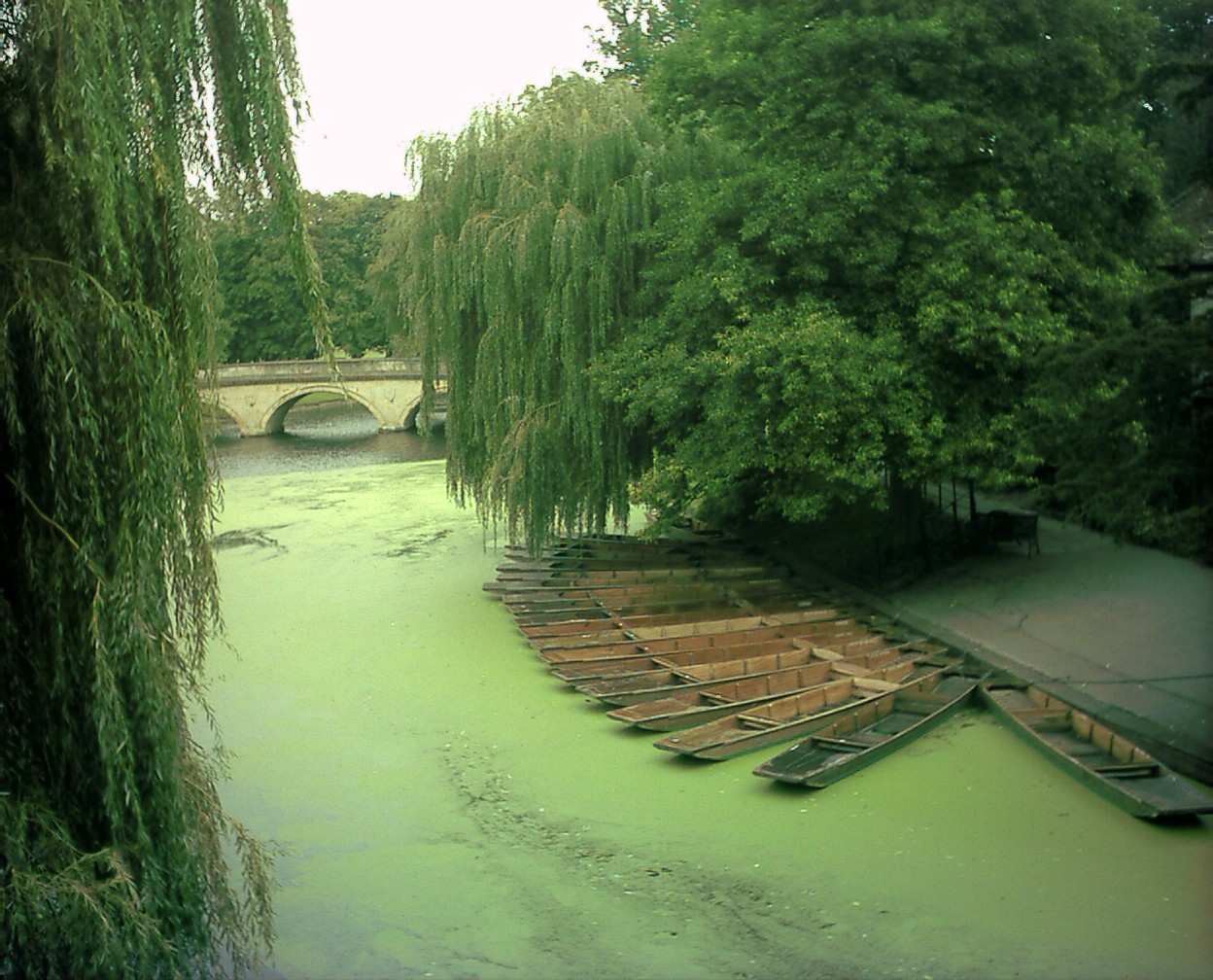
A view of the River Cam near Trinity College

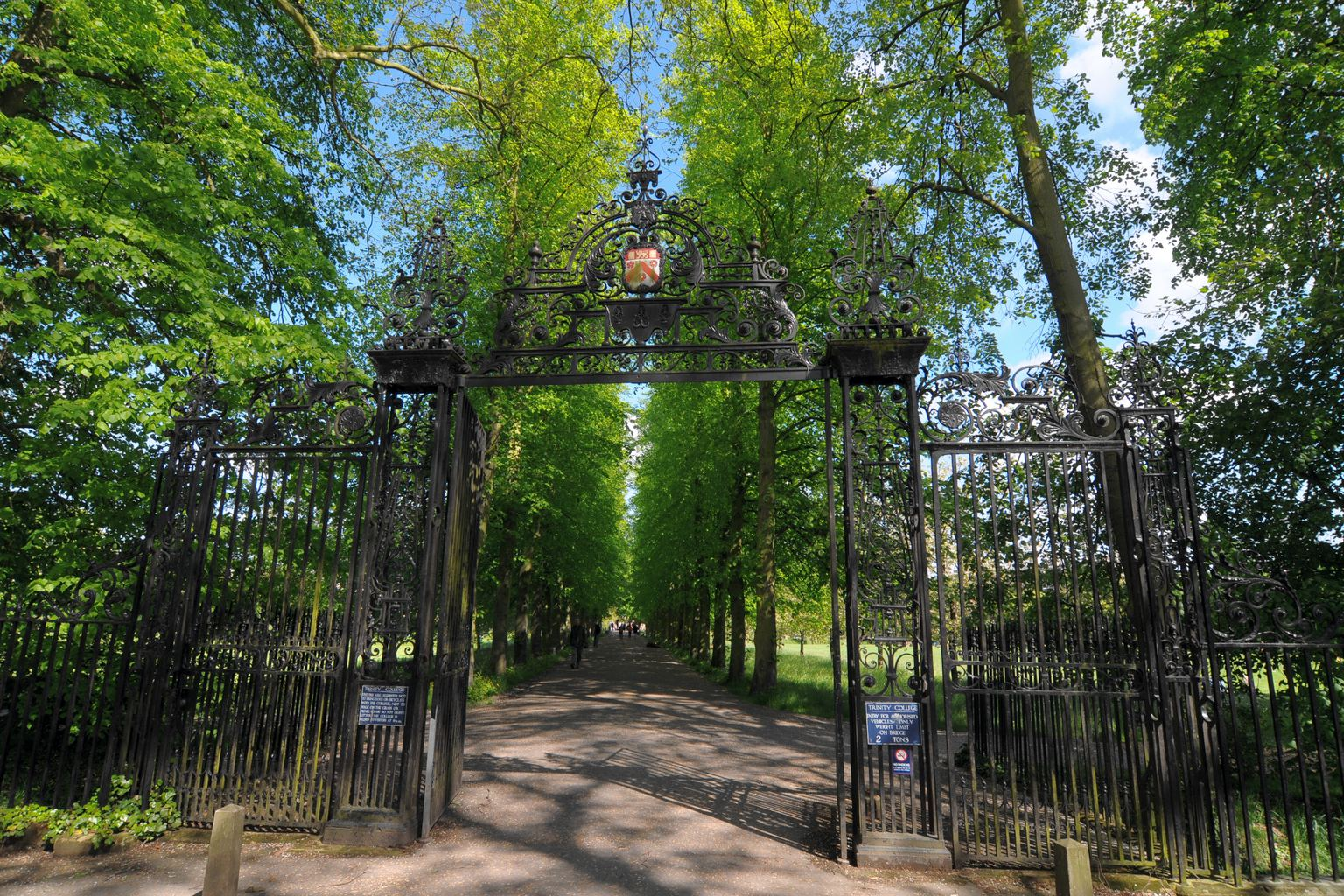
Trinity College's avenue and gate to Queen's Road viewed from the Backs

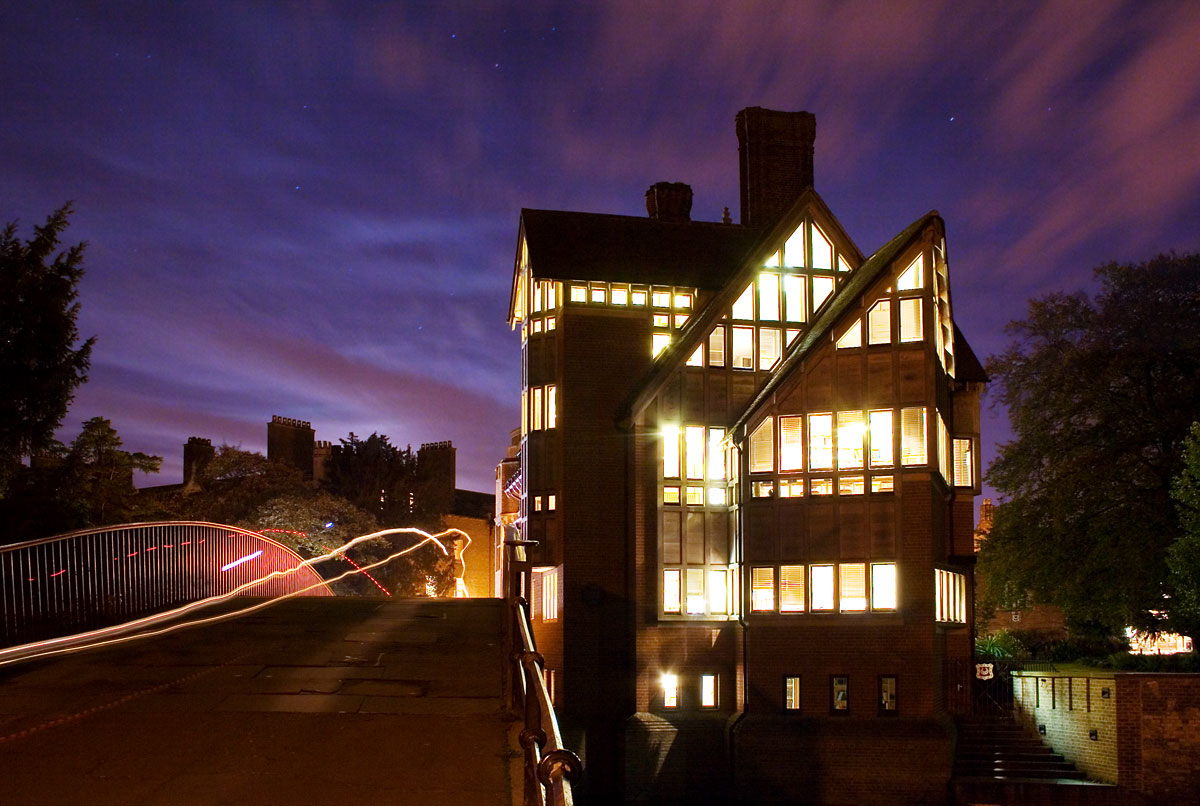
Trinity Hall's Jerwood Library on the bank of the Cam

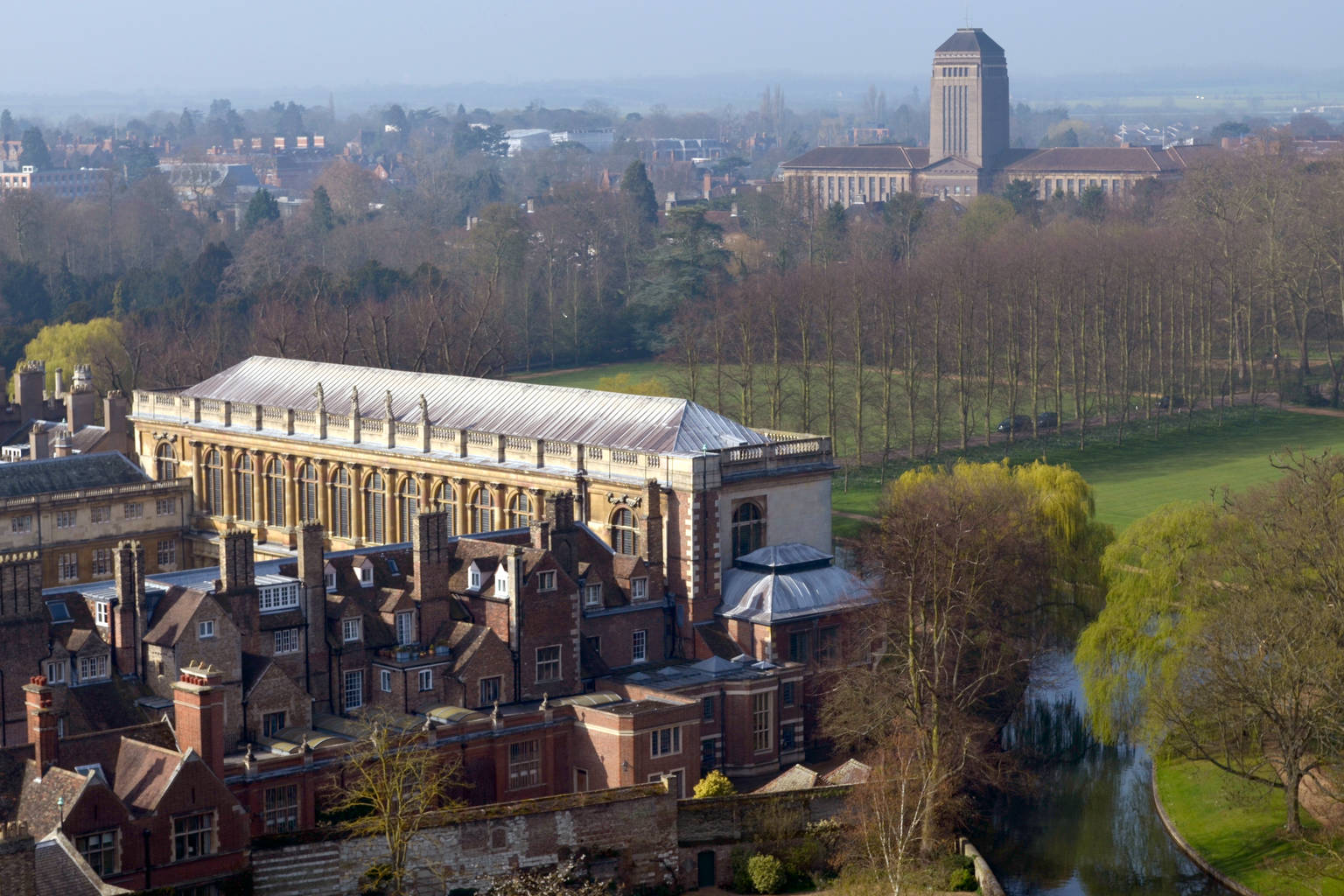
View of the northern end, with the Wren Library and University Library, from St John's College tower

== See also ==
- List of bridges in Cambridge
- Punt (boat)
