= Harry Barton (priest) =

Harry Douglas Barton, MA (1 December 1898 – 16 March 1968) was Archdeacon of Sudbury from 1962 until his death.

Barton was educated at King's Ely and Corpus Christi College, Cambridge. He was ordained in 1924 and served curacies in Swansea and Bradford.

He was Vicar of Coleshill, Warwickshire from 1938; an Army Chaplain during World War II; Rural Dean of Sutton Coldfield, then Sudbury before he took up his Archdeacon’s appointment.

Church of England titles
Preceded by Hugh Ross Norton	Archdeacon of Sudbury; 1962–1968	Succeeded by David Rokeby Maddock
