= Eric Buckley =

Anglican priest (1868–1948)

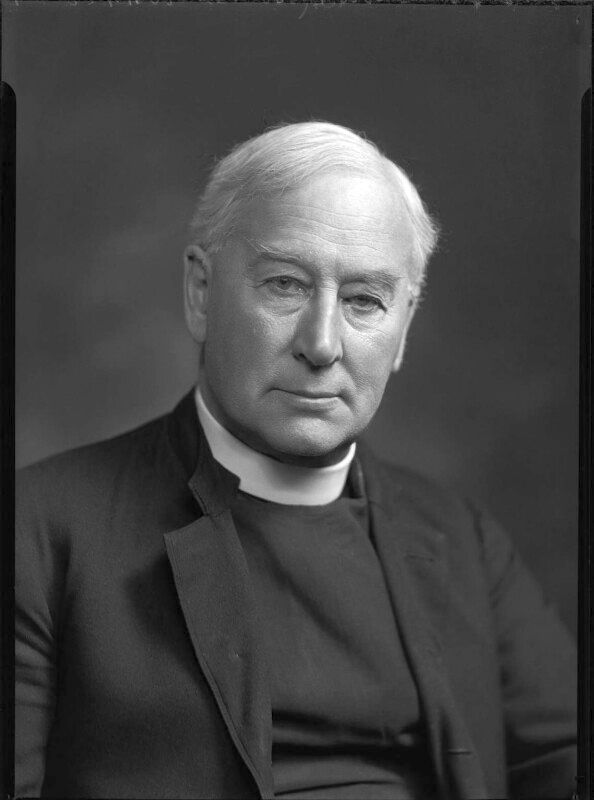
Buckley, 17 November 1933

Eric Rede Buckley (31 August 1868 – 6 March 1948) was Archdeacon of Sudbury from 1930 until 1932.

Buckley was educated at Merchant Taylors' School, Northwood and St John's College, Oxford; and ordained in 1892. His first post was a curacy at Bodmin. After this he was Vicar of Kirtlington (1895–1902) then Burley in Wharfedale (1902–21). He was Chaplain to the Bishop of Bradford until his Archdeacon’s appointment.

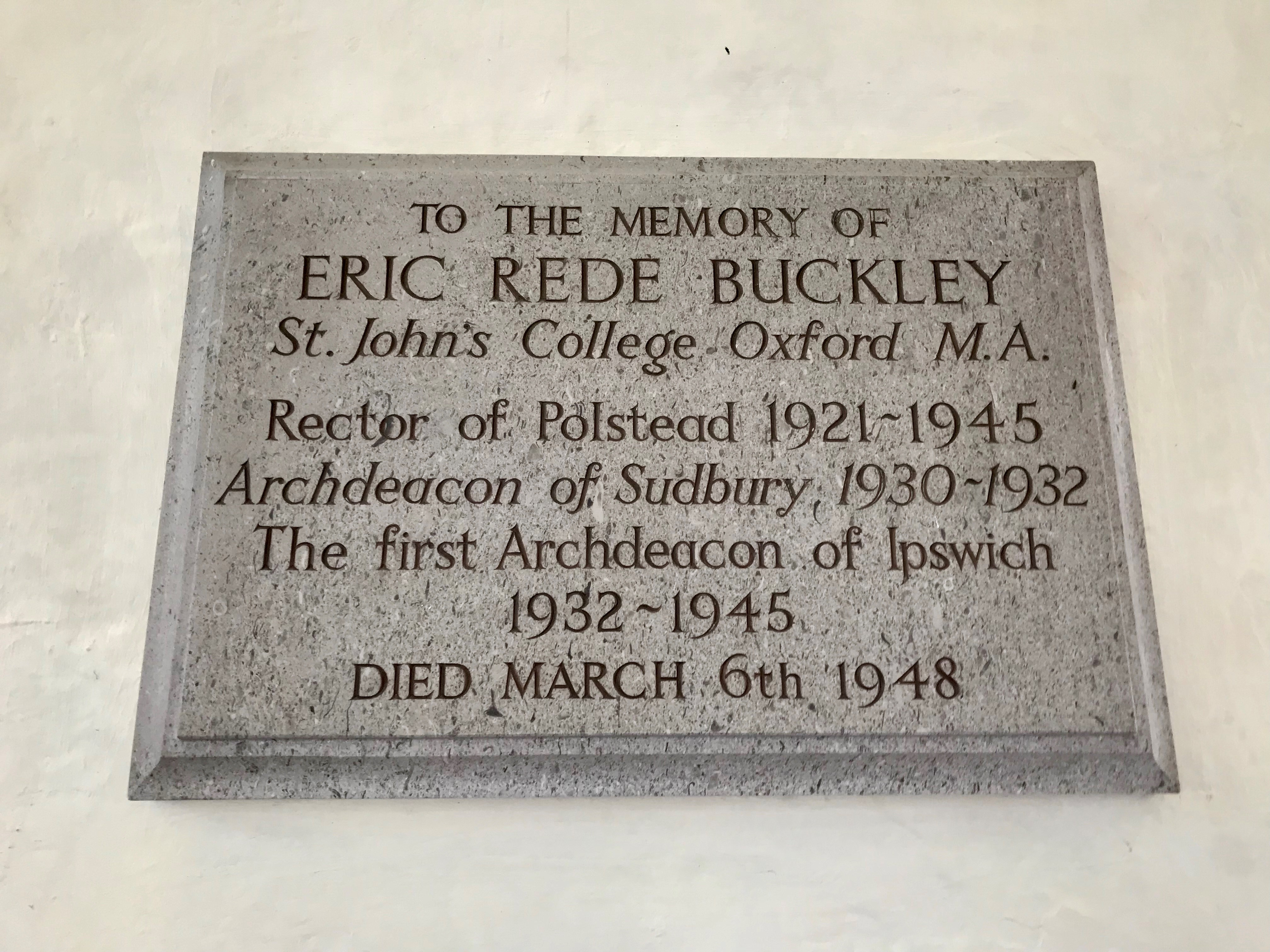
Memorial to Eric Buckley in St Mary's Church, Polstead, Suffolk

Church of England titles
Preceded by William Thomas Farmiloe	Archdeacon of Sudbury; 1930–1932	Succeeded by Maxwell Homfray Maxwell-Gumbleton
