= Michael Ricketts (disambiguation) =

Michael Ricketts (born 1978) is an English former footballer.

Michael Ricketts may also refer to:

- Michael Ricketts (musician) (born 1965), American musician
- Michael Ricketts (football administrator), Jamaican football administrator
- Michael Ricketts (cricketer) (1923–2004), English cricketer
