= John Gooch =

John Gooch may refer to:

- Johnny Gooch (1897–1975), baseball player
- Tiny Gooch (1903–1986), American all-round athlete
- John Gooch (priest) (1752–1823), Anglican priest
- John Viret Gooch (1812–1900), locomotive superintendent of the London and South Western Railway
- Sir (Richard) John Sherlock Gooch, 12th Baronet (1930–1999) of the Gooch baronets
- Jon Gooch (born 1984), DJ and musician
