= David Brierley =

David Brierley (12 December 1953 – 1 August 2009) was Archdeacon of Sudbury from 2006 until his death in 2009.

Brierley was educated at the University of Bristol and ordained in 1978. After a curacy in Rochdale he held incumbencies in Eccles and Great Harwood. He was Canon Residentiary at Bradford Cathedral from 2002 to 2004 and then Diocesan Missioner until his appointment as Archdeacon.

Church of England titles
Preceded by John Cox	Archdeacon of Sudbury; 2006–2009	Succeeded by David Jenkins
