= Lyng =

Lyng may refer to:

== People ==
- Ciarán Lyng (born 1985), Irish football player
- Derek Lyng (born 1978), Irish hurling manager and former player
- John Lyng (1905–1978), Norwegian politician
- Lyng (born 2000), stage name of Norwegian footballer Erling Haaland
- Micheál Lyng (born 1985), Irish football player
- Richard Lyng (1918–2003), American administrator in the Reagan administration
- Richard Lyng (archdeacon) (fl. 1347–1366), archdeacon in Suffolk, England

== Places in England ==
- Lyng, Norfolk, village and civil parish
- Lyng, Somerset, villages and civil parish
- Lyng, West Midlands, an area of West Bromwich

== See also ==
- Ling (disambiguation)
