= Archdeacon of Sudbury =

Church of England ecclesiastical office

The Archdeacon of Sudbury is a senior cleric in the Diocese of St Edmundsbury and Ipswich.

The archdeacon is responsible for the disciplinary supervision of the clergy in its five rural deaneries; Clare, Ixworth, Lavenham, Sudbury and Thingoe.

== History ==
This archdeaconry was separated from the original archdeaconry of Suffolk in 1127. Sudbury which comprised eight deaneries in 1256 and in 1911 had eleven. There were also three districts under peculiar jurisdiction of Canterbury and one under that of Rochester.

Originally in the Diocese of Norwich, the Sudbury archdeaconry was transferred by the Ecclesiastical Commissioners to the Diocese of Ely in 1837. It was then transferred a second time to the Diocese of St Edmundsbury and Ipswich in 1914. The current archdeacon is David Jenkins.

== List of archdeacons ==
=== High Medieval ===
From its erection, the archdeaconry was in Norwich diocese. For archdeacons of that diocese before territorial titles began, see Archdeacon of Norwich.

- bef. 1145–aft. 1136: William son of Humphrey (Note: William, Baldwin and Roger are not recorded with the title "Archdeacon of Sudbury"; rather they are each recorded alongside archdeacons of Norwich, of Norfolk and of Suffolk.)
- bef. 1143–aft. 1167: Baldwin of Boulogne
- bef. 1200–aft. 1185: Reiner
- bef. 1193–aft. 1211: Roger
- bef. 1220–bef. 1222 (d.): Robert of Gloucester, Archdeacon of Stafford
- bef. 1224–bef. 1235: Alan de Beccles
- bef. 1241–1242 (res.): Roger Pincerna, Le Boteler (became Archdeacon of Suffolk)
- 1242–aft. 1256: William de Clare
- bef. 1266–1267: Thomas Ingoldsthorpe (became Archdeacon of Middlesex)
- 1267–aft. 1273: Constantine de Mildenhall
- bef. 1279–aft. 1279: Ralph de Fornham
- bef. 1285–bef. 1294: Ralph of York

=== Late Medieval ===
- bef. 1307–bef. 1308: Henry de Bradenham
- 1 April 1308 – 1324 (res.): Alan de Ely (became Archdeacon of Suffolk)
- 16 April 1324–bef. 1329: Simon de Creake
- 17 January 1329–bef. 1346 (d.): Firmin de Lavenham
- 31 August 1346–bef. 1348 (d.): Gilbert de Marewell or de Yarewell
- 12 October 1348 – 1349 (res.): Richard Lyng (became Archdeacon of Norwich)
- 27 August–20 November 1349 (exch.): Walter Elvedon
- 20 November–bef. December 1349 (res.): Thomas de Winchester
- 8 December 1349–bef. 1350 (res.): Thomas de Methelwold
- 3 January 1350–bef. 1361 (d.): Henry de la Zouche
- 7 January 1362–bef. 1365 (res.): William Graa de Trusthope (became Archdeacon of Suffolk)
- bef. 1363–aft. 1363: John Hambleton
- 8 May 1384–?: John de Lincoln (royal grant)
- 3 September 1384–bef. 1389 (res.): Hugh Sturmy (royal grant)
- 1385: Thomas Grene (bishop's candidate; ineffective)
- 14 November 1388: Hugh Gaudeby (bishop's candidate; ineffective)
- 5 May 1389 – 5 November 1398 (exch.): Thomas Hetersete
- 5 November–bef. December 1398 (res.): Richard Maudeleyn
- 18 December 1398–bef. 1406 (res.): Thomas Hetersete (again)
- 12 January 1406–bef. 1414 (d.): Eudo de la Zouche
- 2 December 1412 (royal grant): Roger Wodehele (ineffective)
- 13 March 1414 – 18 April 1429 (exch.): Thomas Rodborne
- 18 April 1429–bef. 1452 (d.): Clement Denston
- 24 May 1452–bef. 1462: John Wiggenhall
- bef. 1462–bef. 1479 (d.): John Selot
- 9 September 1479–aft. 1483: Nicholas Goldwell
- bef. 1484–bef. 1493 (d.): John Jeffreys
- 3 December 1493–bef. 1497 (d.): Thomas Shenkwyn
- 14 December 1497–bef. 1514 (d.): John Finneys
- 3 April 1514 – 1517 (res.): William Stillington (became Archdeacon of Norwich)
- 17 February 1517 – 1522 (res.): Thomas Larke (became Archdeacon of Norwich) (Note: Larke's sister was the mistress of Cardinal Wolsey)
- 9 April 1522–bef. 1537 (d.): Richard Woleman (also Dean of Wells from 1529)
- 21 September 1537 – 1570 (d.): Miles Spencer

=== Early modern ===
- 2 March 1570–bef. 1576 (d.): Thomas Aldrich
- March 1576 – 1593 (res.): John Still (became Bishop of Bath and Wells)
- 15 June 1593–?: Tertullian Pyne
- 6 October 1599–bef. 1621 (d.): Cuthbert Norris
- 27 December 1621–bef. 1652 (d.): Theophilus Kent
- 7 August 1660 – 1667 (res.): Anthony Sparrow (became Bishop of Exeter)
- 5 December 1667 – 27 May 1693 (d.): John Spencer (also Dean of Ely from 1677)
- 14 June 1693 – 30 January 1727 (d.): Nicholas Clagett
- 16 March 1727 – 20 November 1741 (d.): Brampton Gurdon
- 24 November 1741 – 14 October 1784 (d.): John Chapman
- 20 October 1784 – 14 July 1823 (d.): John Gooch
- 21 July 1823 – 4 May 1862 (d.): George Glover

Transferred to Diocese of Ely by Order in Council, 19 April 1837.

=== Late modern ===
- 1862–1869 (res.): Lord Arthur Hervey (became Bishop of Bath and Wells)
- 1869–1900 (res.): Frank Chapman, Vicar of St James's, Bury St Edmunds (until 1873), Rector of Stowlangtoft (1878–1881)
- 1901–12 May 1902 (d.): Arthur Livingstone
- 1902–30 August 1921 (d.): George Hodges, Vicar of St James's, Bury St Edmunds (until 1912), then a canon residentiary of St Edmundsbury Cathedral

Suffolk and Sudbury archdeaconries were erected into the new Diocese of St Edmundsbury and Ipswich on 23 January 1914.

- 1921–1930 (ret.): William Farmiloe, Canon Missioner
- 1930–1932 (res.): Eric Buckley, Rector of Polstead (became Archdeacon of Ipswich)

The Ipswich archdeaconry was created from the archdeaconries of Suffolk and of Sudbury by Order-in-Council on 22 December 1931; Buckley transferred to the new archdeacony.

- 1932–1945 (ret.): Maxwell Maxwell-Gumbleton, assistant bishop (until 1934), then Bishop suffragan of Dunwich (previously Bishop of Ballarat)
- 1945–1962 (res.): Hugh Norton, Rector of Horringer with Ickworth (until 1958), then a canon residentiary of the cathedral (afterwards archdeacon emeritus)
- 1962–16 March 1968 (d.): Harry Barton, Rector of Sudbury (until 1967)
- 1968–1970 (res.): David Maddock, Bishop suffragan of Dunwich
- 1970–25 October 1983 (d.): Kenneth Child, Rector of Great and Little Thurlow with Little Bradley (until 1980)
- 1984–1991 (ret.): Donald Smith (afterwards archdeacon emeritus)
- 1991–1994 (res.): Richard Garrard (became Bishop suffragan of Penrith)
- 1994–2006 (ret.): John Cox (afterwards archdeacon emeritus)
- 2006 – 1 August 2009 (d.): David Brierley
- February 2010 – present: David Jenkins

== Sources ==
- Greenway, Diana E., ed. (1971), Fasti Ecclesiae Anglicanae 1066–1300, vol. 2, pp. 69–71
- Jones, B., ed. (1963), Fasti Ecclesiae Anglicanae 1300–1541, vol. 4, pp. 30–32
- Horn, Joyce M., ed. (1992), Fasti Ecclesiae Anglicanae 1541–1857, vol. 7, pp. 49–50
