= Frank Chapman (priest) =

Francis Robert Chapman (31 January 1831 – 18 March 1924), known as Frank, was an Anglican priest, Archdeacon of Sudbury from 1869 until 1900.

Chapman was educated at Exeter College, Oxford and ordained in 1855. He served curacies at Leeds then Kensington. He was Perpetual Curate at Walsham-le-Willows from 1860 to 1865 and the Vicar of St James's, Bury St Edmunds from 1865 to 1873; and Rector of Stowlangtoft from 1873 to 1881.

Chapman edited two volumes The Sacrist Rolls of Ely (1907–8).

Church of England titles
Preceded by Lord Arthur Hervey	Archdeacon of Sudbury; 1869–1900	Succeeded by Arthur Livingstone
