= Arthur Livingstone =

Arthur Guinness Livingstone (1840 - 12 May 1902) was an Anglican priest who was Archdeacon of Sudbury from 1901 to 1902.

== Biography ==
Livingstone was born in 1840, the fifth son of William Livingstone, of Westport, County Mayo, and was educated at Queen's College, Oxford, where he graduated in 1864. He was admitted deacon following his graduation, and ordained priest in 1865. His first curacy was at St Peter in the East, Oxford, but two years later he was appointed as Curate of Bisley, Gloucestershire, in 1867. After service as Assistant Chaplain to one of the English churches in Rome from 1871 to 1872, he was briefly Curate of Longsdon, Worcestershire (1872–74), and Vicar of Forthampton, near Tewkesbury (1874–77). In 1877 he accepted from Sir Henry Bunbury the vicarage of Mildenhall, Suffolk, in the diocese of Ely, which he held till 1898. He was made Rural Dean of Mildenhall in 1894, and from 1898 held an honorary canonry in Ely Cathedral. He was appointed Archdeacon of Sudbury in 1901.

Livingstone died at the residence of his son-in-law, the Rev. R. W. Barber, at Thurston, Suffolk, on 12 May 1902.

Church of England titles
| Preceded by Frank Chapman | Archdeacon of Sudbury; 1901–1902 | Succeeded by George Hodges |
