= Tertullian Pyne =

16th-century English Anglican priest

Tertullian Pyne was an Anglican priest in England during the 16th century.

Pyne was born in Devon and educated at St John's College, Oxford. He held the living at Swanscombe and was appointed Archdeacon of Sudbury in 1593.
