= Thomas Cashmore =

Thomas Herbert Cashmore (27 April 1892 – 16 July 1984) was Bishop of Dunwich from 1955 to 1967.

== Life ==
Cashmore was born on 27 April 1892, the son of a worker in the railway workshops of the London and North-Western Railway workshops in Wolverton, Buckinghamshire, and educated at Codrington College, Barbados, from 1912 to 1917, taking an external degree from Durham University in 1918. After ordination he was an SPG missionary in Chota Nagpur from 1917 to 1924 and then Vicar of St James's Calcutta, as well as "Rector" (Principal) of Saint James School Calcutta, which he was told "either to kill or revive". He did the latter. A medal named after him is still presented to the outstanding pupil of the year.

Coming to England he held incumbencies at Holmfirth from 1933 to 1942 and Brighouse before an eight-year period as Canon Missioner for the Diocese of Wakefield. In 1955 he became Suffragan Bishop of Dunwich, a post he held until retirement in 1967. He was probably the first Bishop in England for some generations not to have attended university. He died on 16 July 1984

He was awarded the Kaisar-i-Hind medal for public services in India in 1932, and the 1939–45 Defence Medal. He was President of Rotary International of Britain and Ireland in 1950–51. In the 1920s he was Secretary of the Calcutta Club and was the subject of some controversy when he asked Mahatma Gandhi to speak there.

He married (Kate) Marjorie Hutchinson in 1919, in Ranji, India. They had five children, and additionally adopted an Anglo-Indian daughter, who pre-deceased them.

== Notes ==
Church of England titles
Preceded by Clement Mallory Ricketts	Bishop of Dunwich; 1955–1967	Succeeded by David Rokeby Maddock
