= David Jenkins (archdeacon of Sudbury) =

David Harold Jenkins (born Belfast, 19 October 1961) is the current Archdeacon of Sudbury.

Jenkins was educated at the Belfast Royal Academy, Sidney Sussex College, Cambridge and Ripon College Cuddesdon. He was ordained in 1989 and after curacies at Chesterton and Earley held two incumbencies in Blackpool and Broughton. He was then Director of Education for the Diocese of Carlisle and a Canon Residentiary at Carlisle Cathedral until his archdeacon’s appointment.

He has academic interests in early medieval church history and has published in this area. He is a Fellow of the Royal Historical Society.

Church of England titles
Preceded by John Stuart Cox	Archdeacon of Sudbury; 2010–present	Succeeded by incumbent
