= Hugh Norton =

British archdeacon

Hugh Ross Norton OBE (3 April 1890 – 10 January 1969) was Archdeacon of Sudbury from 1945 to 1962.

Norton was born on 3 April 1890 in Marylebone. He was educated at Monkton Combe School and Wadham College, Oxford. He was ordained in 1914 and served curacies in Whitechapel, Stepney and Tottenham; also acting as a wartime Chaplain to the Forces in the Middle East. He was Precentor of Wakefield Cathedral from 1921 to 1924; and again a Chaplain to the Forces from 1924 until 1945 when he took up his Archdeacon’s appointment. He was Rector of Horringer from 1945 to 1958; and then a Canon Residentiary of St Edmundsbury Cathedral from 1958 until 1964: there is a memorial to him in the cathedral. He was Archdeacon Emeritus of Sudbury from 1962 until his death on 10 January 1969 in Bury St Edmunds.

Church of England titles
Preceded by Maxwell Homfray Maxwell-Gumbleton	Archdeacon of Sudbury; 1945–1962	Succeeded by Harry Douglas Barton
