= Stowlangtoft =

Village in Suffolk, England

Coordinates: 52.277°N 0.874°E

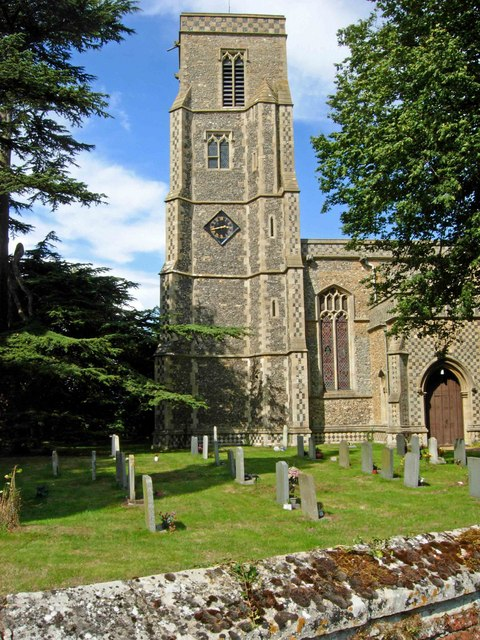
- Church of St George

- Location within Suffolk
- Population: 270 (2005); 228 (2011)
- District: Mid Suffolk
- Shire county: Suffolk
- Region: East
- Country: England
- Sovereign state: United Kingdom
- Post town: Bury St Edmunds
- Postcode district: IP31
- Police: Suffolk
- Fire: Suffolk
- Ambulance: East of England

Stowlangtoft is a village and civil parish in the Mid Suffolk district of Suffolk in eastern England 2 miles (3.2 km) south-east from Ixworth. Located around 5 miles (8.0 km) north-east of Bury St Edmunds, in 2005 its population was 270.

== Name ==
The village, originally just Stow, was held by the de Languetot family in the early 13th century.

== St George's Church ==
For all of Stowlangtoft's small size, St George's is within the group classed as "Great Churches". Simon Jenkins included it in his book England's Thousand Best Churches. The church was built as a single construction project in the late 14th century and barely changed until the restoration work undertaken in the 19th century. The church is in the decorated and later English styles; the chancel contains several richly-carved stalls and monuments to members of the family of D'Ewes. The church and parsonage-house are located on what was once the site of a Roman encampment. Peter Tillemans, one of the founders of the English school of sporting painting, was buried in St George's on 7 December 1734.

Samuel Rickards was rector here for several decades in the mid nineteenth century.

At some point after the Dissolution of the monasteries, St George's acquired six 14th-century misericords. It is not clear where these misericords originated, but possible candidates are Thetford Priory or Bury Abbey.

== Stowlangtoft Hall ==
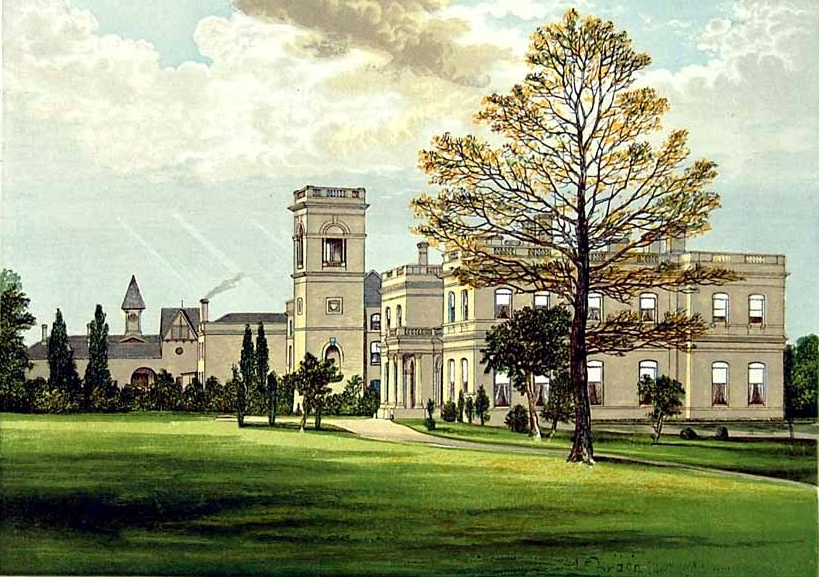
Stowlangtoft Hall, built 1859 by David Mocatta, painted in 1880, by Francis Orpen Morris

Symonds D'Ewes, Bart., the eminent antiquary, lived in Stowlangtoft Hall. The Hall was rebuilt in 1859 for Fuller Maitland Wilson.

In 2011 a gruesome-looking tree in the grounds the hall attracted public attention.

== Notable residents ==
- Thomas Rawlinson, Lord Mayor of London in 1753
- Charles Wombwell, cricketer
- Frank Chapman, priest and Archdeacon of Sudbury
- Fuller Maitland Wilson (MP),
- Henry Fuller Maitland Wilson, army officer, son of Fuller Maitland Wilson
- Samuel Rickards, clergyman, opponent of the Oxford Movement
- D'Ewes baronets
