= Edith Farmiloe =

British children's writer and illustrator

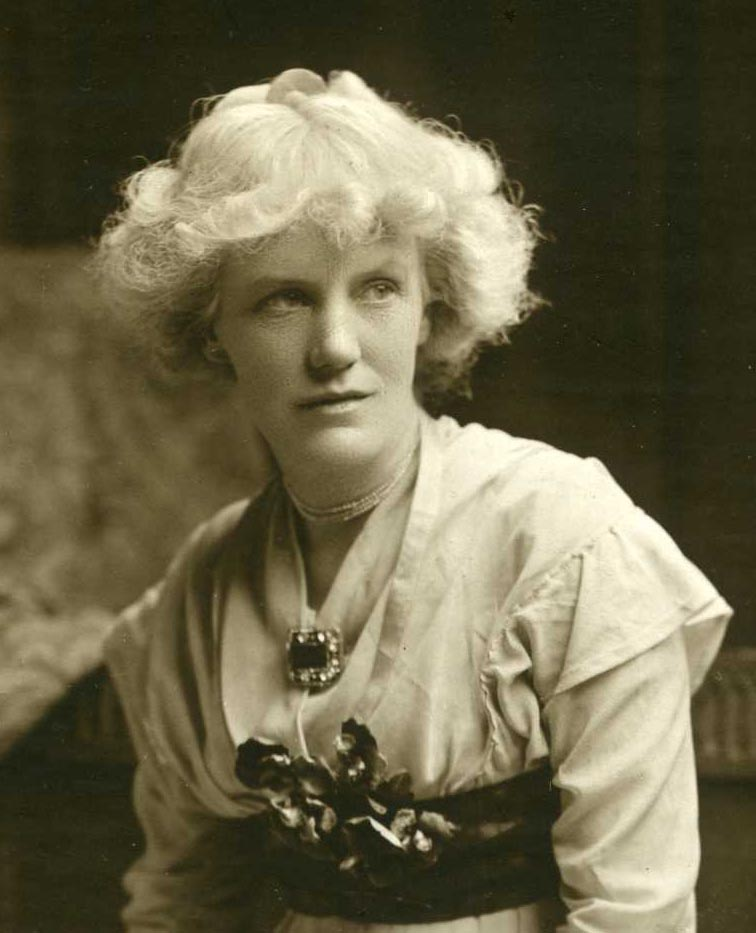
Edith Caroline Farmiloe (1870-1921)

Edith Farmiloe (1870–1921) was a British children's book author and illustrator, active from 1895 to about 1905.

== Life ==
Edith Caroline Parnell was born in Gillingham, Kent, England, in 1870. Her father was Colonel Hon. Arthur Parnell (1841–1914) and her mother was Mary Anne Dunn.

On 7 April 1891, Edith married Venerable William Farmiloe, then vicar of St Peter's in Great Windmill Street, Soho, London. She was living with her husband at 124 Ashley Gardens, opposite Westminster Cathedral in 1901 and was by then listed in the census as an "artist'". In 1905, Rev. Farmiloe and his wife moved to South Hackney where he became vicar of St. Augustine's overlooking Victoria Park.

Farmiloe died on 26 March 1921 at Abbey House, Bury St Edmund's, Suffolk, aged 50, and is commemorated in a stained glass window memorial by Robert Anning Bell in St James's, Nayland. The text reads "Edith Caroline Farmiloe and her life-work among women and children are here commemorated by her husband...who shared in her work and found in her fellowship and example an inspiration for his ministry in London."

== Career ==
Between 1895 and 1909, Farmiloe wrote about and illustrated the lives of children living in her husband's parish in Soho, and later in South Hackney. Her sketches, from her observing children playing on the streets, were used in Events of the Season, which appeared first in Little Folks magazine in November 1895. Detailed bibliographical references to Farmiloe's work are taken from Mr. Beare's 2010 study.

Farmiloe went on to illustrate many children's books including All the World Over (1898), with verses by Edward Verrall Lucas. This collaboration resulted from an association with the publisher Franklin Thomas Grant Richards (who traded as 'Grant Richards'), made in 1897 when she created endpaper designs for his first three 'Dumpy Books for Children'. In All the World Over Farmiloe originated the colour drawings, receiving a royalty of 10% for the first 1500 copies and 15% thereafter. The venture was a success and 2000 copies had sold by the end of 1898.

Farmiloe both wrote and illustrated at least eight books herself. These included 'Chousers' and other stories (1898), Piccalilli (1900), Chapel Street Children (1900), Young George - his Life (1902) and Mr Biddle and the Dragon (1904).

== Critical reception ==
The Standard described All the World Over (1898) as "a pretty volume, brightly illustrated, representing funny children in the costumes of many countries." The Pall Mall Gazette called Rag, Tag, and Bobtail (1989) "one of the few books which deserve a place on the shelves of every (nursery) library." In its review of Piccalilli (1900), the same newspaper wrote that Farmiloe "has an exact eye for the humour and pathos of the children of the street, and her drawings are amazingly true to life, fresh, piquant, and convincing." A review in The Graphic described Chapel Street Children (1900) as "a book which will delight children of any age," adding that Farmiloe is "second to none in her delineations of Cockney gutter imps."

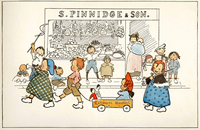
All the World Over London (East) – The Diamond Jubilee

== Selected works ==
- All the World Over (1898) with verses by writer E. V. Lucas
- The Bad family : & other stories (1898) with E. Fenwick
- 'Chousers' and other stories (1898) with Society for Promotion of Christian Knowledge (SPCK)
- Rag, Tag and Bobtail (1898) with her sister, writer Winifred Parnell
- Piccalilli (1900)
- Chapel Street Children (1900)
- The bountiful lady - or, how Mary was changed from a very miserable little girl to a very happy one (1900) with writer Thomas Cobb and other illustrators
- Little Citizens (1901) with Society for Promotion of Christian Knowledge (SPCK)
- Young George - his Life (1902)
- Mr and Mrs Tiddliwinks (1902), with Society for Promotion of Christian Knowledge (SPCK)
- One Day (1903) with other writers
- Mr Biddle and the Dragon (1904)
- Elizabeth over-the-Way (1905)
- Our Darlings (1910) with writers W. Davenport Adams, Catharine Shaw, and other illustrators, Harry B. Neilson, Louis Wain.
