= Clement Ricketts =

English bishop

Clement Mallory Ricketts (19 August 1885 – 28 February 1961) was the second Bishop of Dunwich from 1945 to 1955.

Ricketts was the son of Richard Ernest Ricketts, sometime Vicar of Crambe, North Yorkshire and his wife Mabel Rose Williams. He was educated at The King's School, Canterbury and Keble College, Oxford. He was ordained priest on 2 July 1911, by John Wordsworth, Bishop of Salisbury, at Salisbury Cathedral; he became a curate at Sarum St Martin until 1912 when he became Chaplain of Bishop's College, Cheshunt. In 1914 he went to Ceylon, where he was Vicar of All Angels Colombo until 1923. On his return he was Diocesan and Domestic Chaplain to his father-in-law Rodney Eden. He became vicar of Holy Trinity, Weymouth in 1924 and was Rural Dean of Weymouth until 1927. From 1937 to 1945 he was Canon Residentiary and Missionary of Gloucester Cathedral. He became Bishop of Dunwich in June 1945 and during his nine years of Episcopate he held the livings of Badingham and Dennington. He was consecrated a bishop on St James's Day 1945 (25 July), by Geoffrey Fisher, Archbishop of Canterbury, at Westminster Abbey. In retirement from 1955 to 1961, he lived at Madehurst where he served as curate-in-charge. He died at the age of 81.

Ricketts married Dorothy Frances Eden, daughter of Rodney Eden, Bishop of Wakefield and had two sons and a daughter. One of his sons, Michael, played first-class cricket.

Church of England titles
Preceded by Maxwell Maxwell-Gumbleton	Bishop of Dunwich; 1945 – 1955	Succeeded by Thomas Cashmore
