= Eric Devenport =

Bishop of Dunwich

The Rt Revd Eric Devenport
- Bishop of Dunwich
- Diocese: Diocese of St Edmundsbury and Ipswich
- In office: 1980–1992 (retired)
- Predecessor: William Johnston
- Successor: Jonathan Bailey
- Other posts: Honorary assistant bishop in Norwich (since 2000); Archdeacon of Italy (1992–1997), honorary assistant bishop in Europe

Orders
- Ordination: c. 1951 (deacon); c. 1952 (priest)
- Consecration: 30 September 1980

Personal details
- Born: 3 May 1926
- Died: 10 November 2012 (aged 86)
- Denomination: Anglican
- Parents: Joseph and Emma
- Spouse: Jean Richardson (m. 1954)
- Children: 2 daughters
- Education: Open University

Eric Nash Devenport (3 May 1926 – 10 November 2012) was Bishop of Dunwich from 1980 to 1992.

Devenport was born in Burslem, Stoke-on-Trent. He attended the Lichfield Cathedral choir school until the family moved to Durham. His training at Kelham Hall theological college was interrupted by National Service in the Royal Navy. He was also educated at the Open University. After ordination he held curacies at St Mark's Church, Leicester and St Matthew, Barrow-in-Furness. Following this he was Succentor at Leicester Cathedral, then Vicar of Shepshed and finally (before his ordination to the episcopate) Leader of Mission for the Diocese of Leicester. He resigned in 1992 and became Archdeacon of Italy and Malta and Chaplain of St Mark's, Florence, a post he held for five years.

In retirement he was an assistant bishop in the Norwich Diocese until his death in 2012.

Church of England titles
Preceded by William Johnston	Bishop of Dunwich; 1980–1992	Succeeded by Jonathan Bailey
