= Samuel Rickards =

British clergyman and writer (1796–1865)

Samuel Rickards (1796–1865) was a Church of England clergyman, opponent of the Oxford Movement, and writer of devotional literature.

== Biography ==
Rickards, son of Thomas Rickards of Leicester, was born in 1796. He matriculated from Oriel College, Oxford, on 28 January 1813, graduating B.A. in 1817 and M.A. in 1820. He was a fellow there from 16 April 1819 to 6 October 1822, being contemporary with John Keble and other leaders of the ritualistic movement. He was Newdigate prizeman, 1815, writing on the "Temple of Theseus", and English essayist, 1819, writing on "Characteristic Differences of Greek and Latin Poetry".

His marriage in 1821 obliged him to surrender his fellowship and seek a living. From 1822 to 1832 he was the curate in charge of Ulcombe, Kent. John Henry Newman, while on a visit to him in September 1826, wrote his well-known verses, "Nature and Art", and, during a second visit in October 1827, "Snapdragon, a Riddle".

In 1832 Rickards was presented by a college friend, Henry Wilson, to the rectory of Stowlangtoft, Suffolk, where he passed the remainder of his life.

At an early period he parted company with the Oxford Movement, and wrote expostulatory and warning letters to Keble and Newman. He was nevertheless instrumental in the publication of Keble's "The Christian Year", a duplicate manuscript copy of which was lent to him by Keble, and, when Keble's own copy was lost in Wales, it was Rickards' copy that was printed.

Rickards had a reputation as a sound theologian of high character, and many of his clerical brethren looked up to him for counsel and guidance in the controversies by which his times were marked.

He died at Stowlangtoft rectory on 24 August 1865, leaving his widow, Lucy Maria (d.1883). He was predeceased by his daughter Lucy Maria (b.1823) on 1 March 1863. His daughter had made all the stained glass in the church.

== Works ==
- Hymns for Private Devotion for the Sundays and Saints' Days, 1825
- The Christian Householder, or Guide to Family Prayer, 1830
- Poems, 1870 (posthumous)
- numerous other small devotional works
