= Miles Spencer (priest) =

English priest and academic

Miles Spencer was an English priest and academic in the first half of the 16th century.

Spencer was educated at the University of Oxford. He held livings at Soham and Terrington. He was Archdeacon of Sudbury from 1537 until his death. and Archdeacon of Norwich from 1522 to 1528.
