= Charles Wombwell =

English cricketer

Personal information
- Full name: Charles Orby Wombwell
- Born: 3 April 1813; Stowlangtoft, Suffolk, England
- Died: 14 September 1898 (aged 85); Victoria, London, England
- Batting: Unknown
- Relatives: George Wombwell (father)

Domestic team information
- Years: Team
- 1845: Marylebone Cricket Club

Career statistics
Competition	First-class
Matches	2
Runs scored	6
Batting average	3.00
100s/50s	–/–
Top score	4*
Catches/stumpings	–/–
- Source: Cricinfo, 2 October 2018

Charles Orby Wombwell (3 April 1813 – 14 September 1898) was an English first-class cricketer.

Wombwell was born at Stowlangtoft, Suffolk in April 1813, the son of Sir George Wombwell and his wife Eliza Little. He played in two first-class cricket matches, the first came in 1845 for the Marylebone Cricket Club (MCC) against the West of England at Cricket Down, Bath. His second match came for the Surrey Club against the MCC at The Oval in 1848. He held the rank of cornet in the 10th Royal Hussars. He married Charlotte Catherine Hunter in May 1836, with the couple having one child. He later married Frances Jane Baillie in September 1865, with the couple also having one child. He died at Victoria, London in September 1898.
