= George Glover (priest) =

Anglican priest

George Glover was an Anglican priest, Archdeacon of Sudbury from his installation on 21 July 1823 until his death on 4 May 1862.

Glover was born on 26 April 1779 and educated at Brasenose College, Oxford, where he matriculated in 1797 and graduated in 1801. For many years he held the livings of Southrepps and Gayton.

Church of England titles
Preceded by John Gooch	Archdeacon of Sudbury; 1823–1862	Succeeded by Lord Arthur Hervey
