= William Farmiloe =

Archdeacon of Sudbury from 1921 to 1930

- Born: William Thomas Farmiloe; 15 September 1863
- Died: 4 July 1946 (aged 82)
- Education: Queens' College, Cambridge, Ely Theological College
- Occupation: Anglican clergy
- Known for: Archdeacon of Sudbury
- Spouse: Edith Farmiloe (m. 1891)

William Thomas Farmiloe (15 September 1863 – 4 July 1946) was Archdeacon of Sudbury from 1921 until 1930.

Farmiloe was educated at Queens' College, Cambridge and Ely Theological College. He was ordained in 1887 and served curacies at St Mary's, Barnes and St James's, Piccadilly. He was Vicar of St Peter, Great Windmill Street, Piccadilly from 1894 to 1905; of St Augustine, Victoria Park, London from 1905 to 1909; and of Nayland, Suffolk from 1909 to 1914. He was Canon Missioner of the Diocese of St Edmundsbury and Ipswich from 1914 to 1930; and Chaplain of All Saints, Rome from 1930 to 1933.

Farmiloe married his wife, the children's book writer and illustrator Edith Farmiloe, in 1891.

Church of England titles
Preceded by George Hodges	Archdeacon of Sudbury; 1921–1930	Succeeded by Eric Buckley
