= George Hodges (priest) =

George Hodges (30 May 1851 – 30 August 1921) was an Anglican priest, Archdeacon of Sudbury from 1902 to 1920.

The son of another George Hodges, sometime Vicar of St Andrew, Hastings, he was educated at St John's School, Leatherhead, St John's College, Cambridge and ordained in 1878. He was Curate at Milton-next-Sittingbourne then Stoke-by-Nayland. He was the vicar of St James's, Bury St Edmunds from 1888 to 1912; and Rural Dean of Thingoes from 1888 to 1902. He was a Canon Residentiary at Ely cathedral from 1912.

Church of England titles
Preceded by Arthur Guinness Livingstone	Archdeacon of Sudbury; 1902–1921	Succeeded by William Thomas Farmiloe
