= Richard Woleman =

English churchman

Richard Woleman or Wolman (died 1537) was an English churchman, Archdeacon of Sudbury from 1522; and the Dean of Wells between 1529 and 1537.

== Life ==
In 1478 Wolman was a member of Corpus Christi College, Cambridge. He also studied abroad, being noted in the Oxford register as doctor of the civil law "of an [sic] university beyond the seas". He was principal of St. Paul's Inn, in the university of Cambridge, in 1510, and was made doctor of canon law in 1512. On 31 October 1514 he was admitted an advocate, and on 9 April 1522 collated to the archdeaconry of Sudbury. In 1524 he became vicar of Walden, Essex, and on 26 July of the same year canon of St. Stephen's, Westminster.

Wolman appears to have been resident at court in 1525, and to have been an intermediary with the king, during the absence of Thomas Wolsey, in the matter of ecclesiastical preferments. He was made chaplain to the king Henry VIII in 1526, and a master of requests in attendance at the court, an office involving membership of the king's council. On 4 July 1526 he was presented to the living of Amersham, but he continued to reside at court.

On 17 May 1527 Wolsey sat at his house at Westminster to hear the pleadings in the king's divorce suit. On this occasion Wolman was nominated by the king promoter of the suit. On 5 and 6 April 1527 he took the evidence of Richard Foxe as to Henry's protest against the marriage with Catherine of Aragon. On 31 May he brought forward this evidence and adduced arguments against the dispensing power of the pope. During the proceedings Wolman acted as a secret negotiator between the king and Wolsey. His reward was a prebend in St Paul's Cathedral (25 June) and a third share of the advowson of the first canonry and prebend void in St. Stephen's, Westminster. He is frequently referred to as a canonist of authority by the correspondents of the king and of Wolsey during the divorce proceedings. He was one of twenty-one commissioners to whom Wolsey, on 11 June 1529, delegated the hearing of causes in chancery. He was one of the signatories of the address to Pope Clement VII.

Some time after 29 August 1529, and before 8 November following, when he was elected prolocutor of Convocation, Wolman was appointed dean of Wells. In October 1531 he was incorporated at Oxford. He sat on the Committee of convocation which on 10 April 1532 received the subscription of Hugh Latimer to articles propounded to him. On the following 30 June he was presented by the crown to the rectory of High Hunger (Ongar) in Essex.

When, in October 1532, Henry VIII left England for an interview with Francis I of France at Boulogne, Wolman was one of the council exercising the royal power in London. On 19 March 1533 he was made canon of Windsor, As dean of Wells he signed the acknowledgment of the royal supremacy on 6 July 1534. He cultivated Thomas Cromwell's favour and supported the new queen Anne Boleyn. He signed a declaration, as a doctor of canon law, on the subject of holy orders in 1536. This was put forward in support of the recent religious changes, and bore the signature of Cromwell, as the king's vicegerent, at its head. When the Lincolnshire rebellion broke out, in the autumn of 1536, Wolman was appointed to act on the council of the queen Jane Seymour, during the contemplated absence of the king.

Wolman signed, in 1537, the address of convocation to the king desiring his sanction to the Institution of a Christian Man. He died in the summer of 1537, and was buried in the cloisters of Westminster Abbey. He left a sum of money for the construction of a market cross and shelter at Wells, which was erected by 1542. He also founded an exhibition at Cambridge.
