= William Johnston (bishop) =

The Rt Rev William Johnston (7 July 1914 – 23 May 1986) was Bishop of Dunwich from 1977 to 1980.

He was born on 7 July 1914 and educated at Bromsgrove School and Selwyn College, Cambridge. After ordination he held curacies in Headingley and Knaresborough. Following this he was Vicar of St. Bartholomew's Church, Armley, then of St Chad, Shrewsbury and finally (before elevation to the episcopate) Archdeacon of Bradford. He died on 23 May 1986.

== Notes ==
Church of England titles
Preceded by David Rokeby Maddock	Bishop of Dunwich; 1977 – 1980	Succeeded by Eric Nash Devenport
