= King's College Bridge =

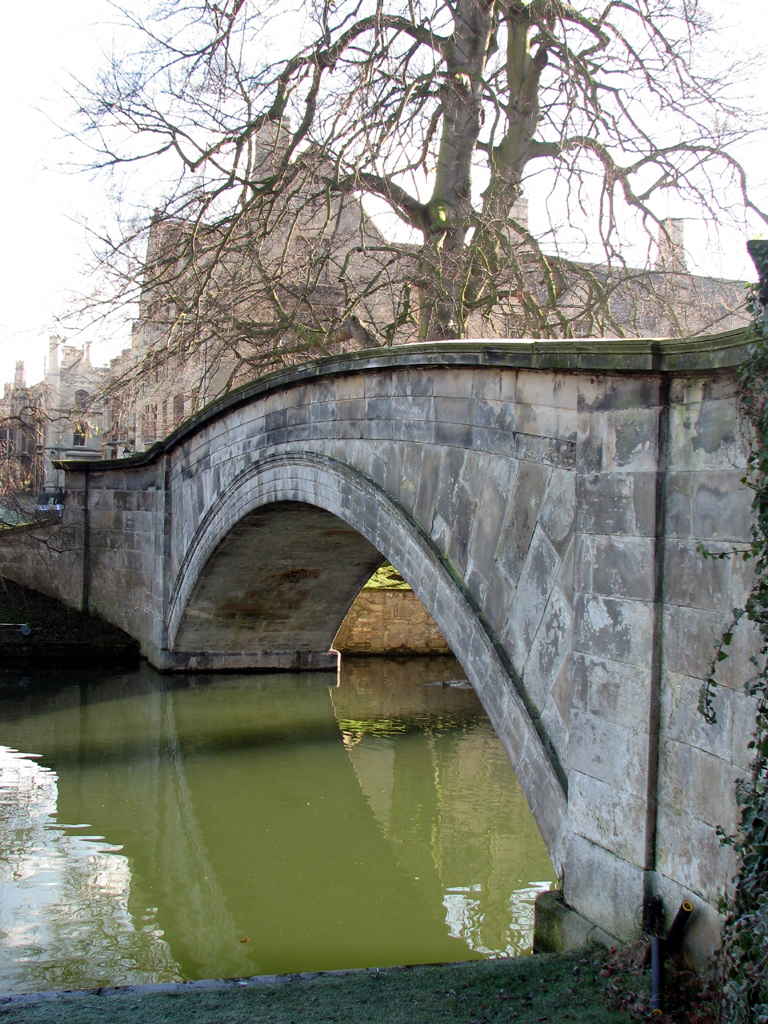
- Coordinates: 52°12′14″N 0°06′51″E
- Crosses: River Cam
- Locale: King's College, Cambridge
- Preceded by: Mathematical Bridge
- Followed by: Clare College Bridge

Characteristics
- Design: arch bridge
- Material: Stone

History
- Designer: William Wilkins
- Construction end: 1819

Location
- Interactive map of King's College Bridge

King's College Bridge is the eighth river Cam bridge overall and the fourth bridge on its middle upstream in Cambridge. In the 15th century there was built the first wooden bridge, the current stone structure was designed by famous British architect William Wilkins in 1818 and it was constructed by Francis Braidwood in 1819.

== See also ==
- List of bridges in Cambridge
- Template:River Cam map
