= Bishop of Dunwich =

Suffragan bishop in the Church of England

The Bishop of Dunwich is an episcopal title which was first used by an Anglo-Saxons bishop between the 7th and 9th centuries and is currently used by the suffragan bishop of the Diocese of St Edmundsbury and Ipswich. The title takes its name after Dunwich in the English county of Suffolk, which has now largely been lost to the sea.

In 1934 the Church of England revived the title Bishop of Dunwich as a suffragan see; the See was erected under the Suffragans Nomination Act 1888 by Order in Council on 14 August 1934. The bishop's duties are to assist the diocesan Bishop of St Edmundsbury and Ipswich in overseeing the Diocese of St Edmundsbury and Ipswich.

== List of bishops ==
Bishops of Dunwich
| From | Until | Incumbent | Notes |
|---|---|---|---|
| 1934 | 1945 | Maxwell Maxwell-Gumbleton | Formerly Bishop of Ballarat; assistant bishop in St Edmundsbury since 1931. |
| 1945 | 1955 | Clement Mallory Ricketts | |
| 1955 | 1967 | Thomas Cashmore | |
| 1967 | 1977 | David Maddock | |
| 1977 | 1980 | William Johnston | |
| 1980 | 1992 | Eric Devenport | |
| 1992 | 1995 | Jonathan Bailey | Translated to Derby. |
| 1995 | 1999 | Tim Stevens | Translated to Leicester. |
| 1999 | 2013 | Clive Young | Retired 12 May 2013. |
| 2013 | 2016 | vacant | No new suffragan was appointed during the lengthy vacancy (October 2013–May 2015) in the diocesan see, because the diocesan bishop makes the appointment. |
| 2016 | 2024 | Mike Harrison | Consecrated on 24 February 2016; translated to Exeter, 25 September 2024. |
