= John Gooch (priest) =

John Gooch (c. 1752 – 1823) was an Anglican priest, Archdeacon of Sudbury from his installation on 20 October 1784 until his death on 14 July 1823.

The son of Sir Thomas Gooch, 3rd Baronet, he was born at Benacre, Suffolk on 26 May 1752. He was educated at Christ Church, Oxford, where he matriculated in 1769, aged 17, and graduated B.A. in 1773, M.A. in 1776. For many years he held the livings of Saxlingham and Benacre.

== Notes ==
Church of England titles
Preceded by John Chapman	Archdeacon of Sudbury; 1784–1823	Succeeded by George Glover
