= Richard Lyng (archdeacon) =

Roman Catholic priest

Richard Lyng was the Archdeacon of Suffolk between 3 and 27 May 1347 and then the Archdeacon of Sudbury between 1348 and 1366.

Church of England titles
Preceded by Gilbert de Marewell	Archdeacon of Chichester; 1348–1349	Succeeded by Walter Elvedon
