= Michael Ricketts (cricketer) =

English cricketer, British Army officer, and educator

Personal information
- Full name: Michael Rodney Ricketts
- Born: 29 September 1923; Edgbaston, Warwickshire, England
- Died: 21 November 2004 (aged 81); Truro, Cornwall, England
- Batting: Right-handed

Domestic team information
- Years: Team
- 1947–1954: Suffolk

Career statistics
Competition	First-class
Matches	1
Runs scored	1
Batting average	1.00
100s/50s	–/–
Top score	1
Catches/stumpings	–/–
- Source: ESPNcricinfo, 21 February 2019

Michael Rodney Ricketts (29 September 1923 – 21 November 2004) was an English first-class cricketer, British Army officer and educator. Ricketts served during the Second World War with the King's Royal Rifle Corps, attending the University of Oxford after the conclusion of the war. During this time he played first-class cricket for the Free Foresters, before embarking on a teaching career that saw him become the headmaster of the independent Sutton Valence School in Kent.

== Early life, WWII and Oxford ==
Ricketts was born in the Birmingham suburb of Edgbaston to Clement Ricketts and his wife, Dorothy Frances Eden. He was educated at Sherborne School in Dorset. He served in the British Army during World War II with the King's Royal Rifle Corps, enlisting with the rank of second lieutenant in May 1943. During the war he was wounded in action.

Following the war he attended Trinity College, Oxford. While at Oxford one appearance in first-class cricket for the Free Foresters against Oxford University at Oxford. Batting once in the match, Ricketts was dismissed by Philip Whitcombe for a single run in the Free Foresters first-innings. He also played minor counties cricket for Suffolk from 1947–1954, making 53 appearances in the Minor Counties Championship.

== Teaching career and later life ==
After graduating from Oxford with a Master of Arts in 1951, he moved into teaching. He was a housemaster at Bradfield College, where he helped to run the college Cadet Force. He later served as the headmaster of Sutton Valence School, a post he held from 1967–1980. The school today has a prize dedicated to him, The Ricketts Prize, designed to recognise a student who has demonstrated an outstanding all-round contribution to school life.

He died at the Royal Cornwall Hospital in Truro in November 2004. He was survived by his wife, Judith Anne Caroline Courtenay-Clack, whom he had married in January 1958, and their four children: two daughters and two sons.
