= John Cox (priest) =

John Stuart Cox (born 13 September 1940) was Archdeacon of Sudbury from 1995 to 2006.

Cox was educated at Fitzwilliam College, Cambridge. He was ordained in 1969 and served curacies in Liverpool and Birmingham. He was Rector of St George, Birmingham, then Selection Secretary for the ACCM. He was a Canon Residentiary at Southwark Cathedral from 1983 to 1991 and then Vicar of Holy Trinity, Roehampton until he took up his Archdeacon's appointment. He has written several books.

Church of England titles
| Preceded by Richard Garrard | Archdeacon of Sudbury; 1995–2006 | Succeeded by David Brierley |
