= Maxwell Maxwell-Gumbleton =

Anglican bishop

Maxwell Homfray Maxwell-Gumbleton (born Maxwell Homfray Smith; 17 June 1872 – 1 February 1952) was an Anglican bishop in the first half of the 20th century.

Maxwell-Gumbleton was born into a legal family. His father was a Puisne Judge in Jamaica. He was educated at Repton School and Peterhouse, Cambridge, and ordained in 1896. After a curacy in Pucklechurch, during which time he married Ella Gillum, he rose rapidly in the Church hierarchy, becoming successively Vicar of Colerne, Rural Dean of Chippenham and Bishop of Ballarat. In 1916 he changed his surname from Smith to Maxwell-Gumbleton under direction of his great uncle's will (in order to remain eligible to inherit his estate). After 10 years as Bishop of Ballarat, he returned to England, where he was appointed as an assistant bishop of St Edmundsbury and Ipswich from 1931 – a position which was later expanded to become the bishop suffragan of Dunwich in 1934. He was additionally Archdeacon of Sudbury from 1932 to 1945.

Church of England titles
Preceded by Arthur Green	Bishop of Ballarat; 1917–1927	Succeeded by Philip Crick
Preceded by himself as Assistant Bishop	Bishop of Dunwich; 1934–1945	Succeeded by Clement Mallory Ricketts
