= David Maddock =

British Anglican bishop

David Rokeby Maddock (30 May 1915 – 20 August 1984) was Bishop of Dunwich from 1967 to 1976.

He was born on 30 May 1915 and educated at Clifton College and St Catherine's College, Oxford.

After ordination he was a curate at Chard and then Vicar of Wilton before 14 years as Rector of Wareham and finally, before his ordination to the episcopate, the Archdeacon of Sherborne (1961–1967) and, from 1966, also Rector of West Stafford in Dorset. He was then appointed Provost of St Edmundsbury (1976–1981).

Maddock was a Freemason, initiated in the Apollo University Lodge, Oxford, in 1937.

He died on 14 August 1984 and was succeeded by William Johnston.

== Notes ==
Church of England titles
Preceded by Thomas Herbert Cashmore	Bishop of Dunwich; 1967 – 1976	Succeeded by William Johnston
