= Clare College Bridge, Cambridge =

Clare Bridge
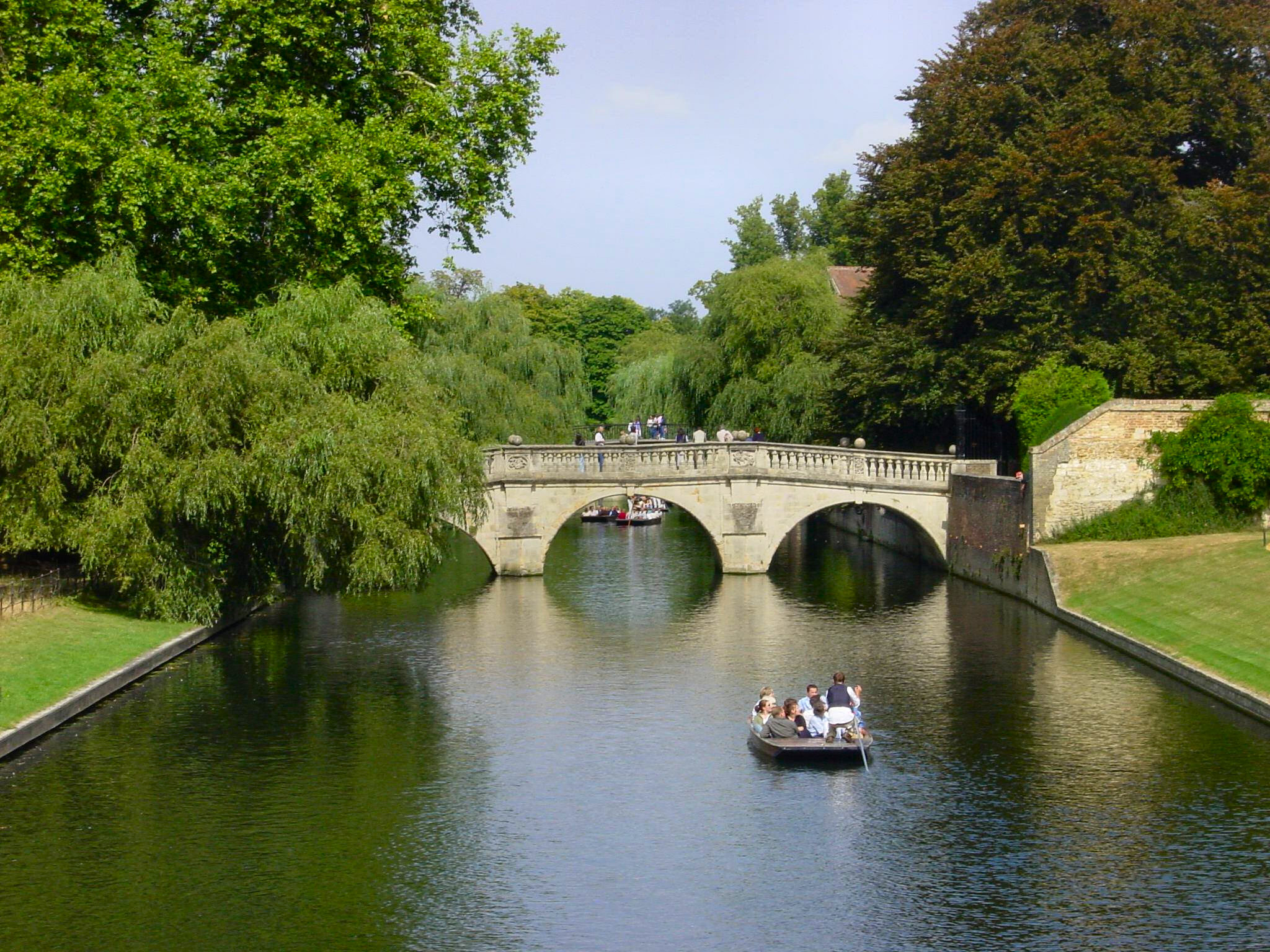
- Coordinates: 52°12′18″N 0°06′50″E
- Crosses: River Cam
- Locale: Clare College, Cambridge
- Preceded by: King's College Bridge
- Followed by: Garret Hostel Bridge

Characteristics
- Design: arch bridge
- Material: Stone

History
- Designer: Thomas Grumbold
- Construction end: 1640

Location
- Interactive map of Clare Bridge

Clare Bridge is the ninth bridge overall and the fifth River Cam bridge on its middle stream in Cambridge. The bridge now connects the Old Court of Clare College to Memorial Court, which was dedicated in 1926. It is a Grade I listed building.

It is the oldest still-functioning bridge in Cambridge, built in 1639-40 by Thomas Grumbold (d.1659). It was restored in 1969.

It is a three-span bridge in Early Renaissance style, built of Ketton stone ashlar. The balustrade has carved relief panels on the pedestals and is surmounted by ball finials. One of the fourteen stone balls has a missing section. Many different tales are told to explain the missing section of the globe second from the left on the south side of the bridge. The story most commonly cited by members of college is that the builder of the bridge was not paid the full amount for his work and so removed the segment to balance the shortfall in payment. A more likely explanation is that a wedge of stone cemented into the ball became loose and fell out.

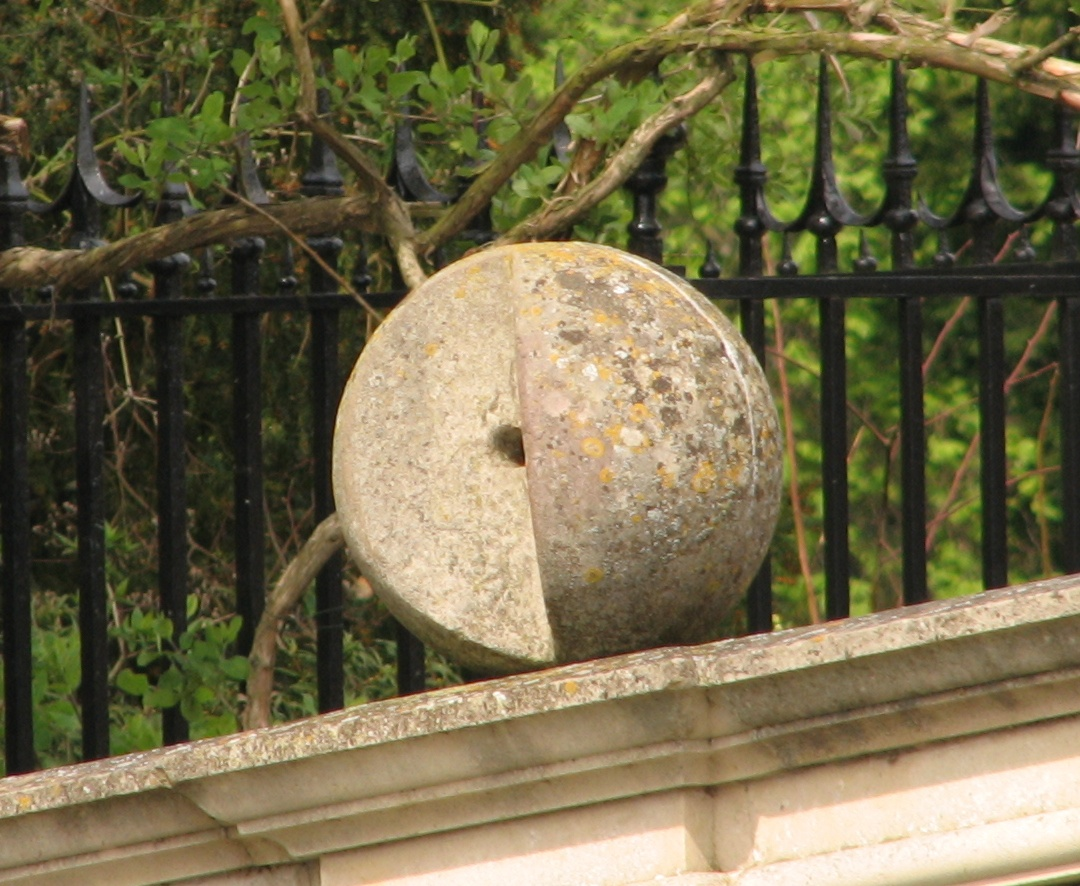
The stone ball with missing wedge

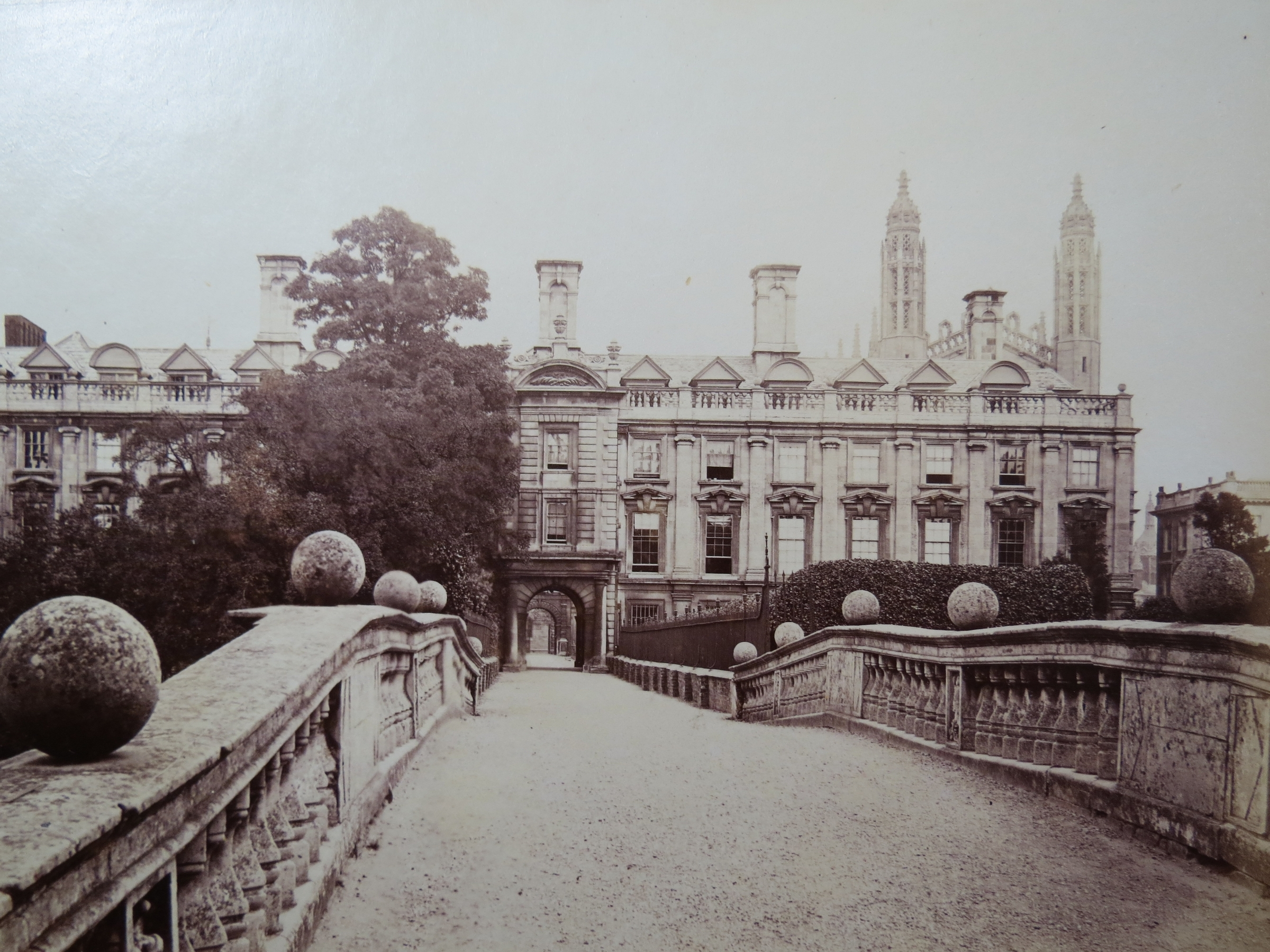
The bridge, circa 1870

== See also ==
- List of bridges in Cambridge
- Template:River Cam map
