= George McLeod =

George McLeod may refer to:

== Politics ==
- George McLeod (New Brunswick politician) (1836–1905), Canadian Member of Parliament for Kent
- George McLeod (British Columbia politician) (1896–1965), Canadian Member of Parliament for Okanagan—Revelstoke
- George Malcolm McLeod (born 1946), politician in Saskatchewan, Canada
- George McLeod (Australian politician) (1884–1919), Australian trade unionist and politician

== Sports ==
- George McLeod (basketball) (1931–2023), basketball player active in the 1950s
- George McLeod (footballer, born 1871) (1871–1921), Australian rules footballer for St Kilda
- George McLeod (footballer, born 1879) (1879–1959), Australian rules footballer for St Kilda and Essendon
- George McLeod (footballer, born 1932) (1932–2016), Scottish footballer

== Other ==
- George McCloud (born 1967), American basketball player active in the 1990s
- Sir George Husband Baird MacLeod (1828–1892), physician to Queen Victoria in Scotland
- George MacLeod (1895–1991), Scottish soldier and clergyman
