= Hugh Webster =

Hugh Webster may refer to:

- Hugh Webster (politician) (1943–2022), member of the North Carolina General Assembly
- Hugh Webster (actor) (1927–1986), Scottish-born Canadian actor
- Hugh Alexander Webster (1849–1926), Scottish teacher, librarian and encyclopaedist
