= Gazetteer for Scotland =

Website

The Gazetteer for Scotland is a gazetteer covering the geography, history and people of Scotland. It was conceived in 1995 by Bruce Gittings of the University of Edinburgh and David Munro of the Royal Scottish Geographical Society, and contains 25,870 entries as of July 2019. It claims to be "the largest dedicated Scottish resource created for the web". The Gazetteer for Scotland provides a carefully researched and editorially validated resource widely used by students, researchers, tourists and family historians with interests in Scotland.

Following on from a strong Scottish tradition of geographical publishing, the Gazetteer for Scotland is the first comprehensive gazetteer to be produced for the country since Francis Groome's Ordnance Gazetteer of Scotland (1882–1886) (the text of which is incorporated into relevant entries). The aim is not to produce a travel guide, of which there are many, but to write a substantive and thoroughly edited description of the country, including industrial sites, notable architecture and many other features not of tourist interest.

Unlike a traditional gazetteer, the Gazetteer for Scotland has been expanded into an encyclopaedia, by including additional entries on famous people, events, Scottish families and family history. These entries are interlinked, and facilities provided to search and map the online database. The Gazetteer for Scotland also includes a simple interface to the historical mapping provided by the National Library of Scotland, and links to other Scottish Government resources, such as listed building information from Historic Environment Scotland and geological maps from the British Geological Survey. As such, it provides a single portal into a vast array of underlying information.

In terms of the web, the Gazetteer for Scotland is historically interesting because it is one of the earliest decisions to take what would have been a book and make it available as a website, realising that the content would grow too much larger than could be economically publishable. The web medium also permitted many more illustrations than would be possible in print. A book has, in fact, been published as a later output of this project Scotland: An Encyclopedia of Places and Landscape (2006), which distills the key facts from the Gazetteer for Scotland database, together with high-quality mapping, into a handy reference form.

== See also ==
- Collins Encyclopaedia of Scotland
- Imperial Gazetteer of England and Wales
- List of online encyclopedias
