= Thomas Allan Croal =

British historian and author

- Born: 9 December 1832; Edinburgh, Scotland
- Died: 4 April 1907 (aged 74); Portobello, Edinburgh, Scotland
- Occupations: Historian, author

Thomas Allan Croal (9 December 1832 – 4 April 1907) was a British historian and author. He wrote, or contributed to, several publications during the late 19th- and early 20th centuries, including A Book About Travelling, Past and Present (1877), Scottish Loch Scenery (1882) and Palaces and Prisons of Mary, Queen of Scots (with Michael Myers Shoemaker, 1903).

In 1901, while working as a correspondent for The Railway News in London, he contributed a section on Scotland's transport system to Francis Hindes Groome's book Ordnance Gazetteer of Scotland: A Graphic and Accurate Description of Every Place in Scotland.

== Early life and career ==
Croal was born in Craig's Close, 265 High Street, Edinburgh, in 1832.

In 1861, he was writing the weekly "Notes from Edinburgh" column in the Inverness Courier. He also worked with his brother, who was a journalist with the Edinburgh Courant.

Up until December 1897, he worked at the General Post Office, before beginning a role as examiner in its accounting department.

== Death ==
Croal died at his home in James Street, Portobello, Edinburgh, on 4 April 1907, aged 74.

== Selected bibliography ==
As author:

- A Book About Travelling, Past and Present (1877)
- Scottish Loch Scenery (with illustrations by Alexander Francis Lydon, 1882)

As co-author:

- Palaces and Prisons of Mary, Queen of Scots (with Michael Myers Shoemaker, 1903)

As contributor:

- Ordnance Gazetteer of Scotland (by Francis Hindes Groome, 1901)
