= George Husband Baird MacLeod =

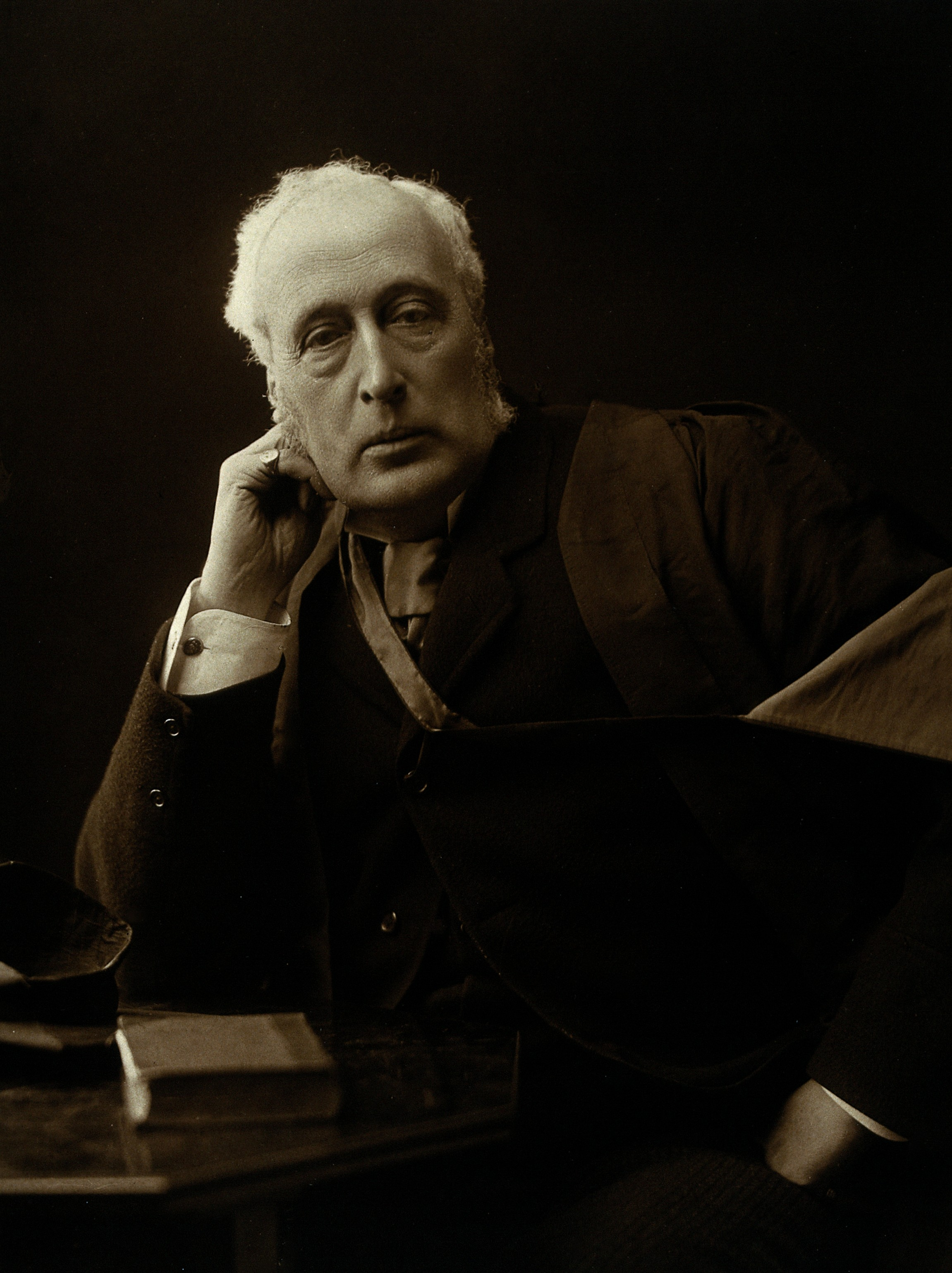
Sir George Husband Baird Macleod

Sir George Husband Baird MacLeod FRSE (1828–1892) was Regius Professor of Surgery at Glasgow University. He was Surgeon in Ordinary to Queen Victoria when in Scotland and was knighted by her in 1887.

== Life ==
He was born in the manse at Campsie, Stirlingshire on 21 September 1828 the son of Rev Norman MacLeod and his wife Agnes Maxwell. Both of his brothers entered the Church of Scotland, in their father's footsteps, one being Rev Norman MacLeod. He appears to have been named after his father's friend, George Husband Baird. He was educated at William Munsie's Academy in Glasgow then studied medicine at Glasgow University then doing further postgraduate studies in Paris and Vienna before gaining his doctorate (MD) in 1853.

He joined the medical team serving the Crimean War acting as Senior Surgeon at the hospital in Smyrna. Returning to Glasgow in 1856 he began lecturing in Surgery at Glasgow Royal Infirmary Medical College and also lecturing in Military Surgery at Anderson College of Medicine. In 1869 he succeeded Joseph Lister as professor of surgery at Glasgow University. He was concurrently Senior Surgeon at Glasgow Royal Infirmary.

In 1870 he was elected a Fellow of the Royal Society of Edinburgh his proposer being James Matthews Duncan.

He died on 31 August 1892 at his home, 10 Woodside Crescent, Glasgow. He is buried close to his parents in Campsie Churchyard.

== Artistic recognition ==
His photograph by Thomas Annan is held in the Scottish National Portrait Gallery.

== Publications ==
- Notes on the Surgery of the War in Crimea (1858)
