= William Melven =

- Occupation(s): Historian, author
- Known for: literature on the history and historical events of Scotland

William Melven was a British historian and author. He wrote, or contributed to, around seventy publications during the late 19th- and early 20th centuries, including Guide to Scotland (1895), A Commercial Gazetteer of the World (1905), John Keltie's A History of the Scottish Highlands: Highland Clans and Highland Regiments (1886) and Ordnance Gazetteer of Scotland (1901) by Francis Hindes Groome.

== Selected bibliography ==
As author:

- Guide to Scotland (1895)
- The Story of the Massacre of Glencoe: with notes on Ballachulish and Glen Etive (1898)
- A Commercial Gazetteer of the World (1905)

As contributor:

- A History of the Scottish Highlands: Highland Clans and Highland Regiments (John Keltie, 1886)
- Ordnance Gazetteer of Scotland (Francis Hindes Groome, 1901)
- The Business Encyclopaedia and Legal Adviser (W. S. M. Knight, 1907)
