= Walter Scott Dalgleish =

British historian and author

- Born: 25 March 1834
- Died: 15 February 1897 (aged 62)
- Occupation(s): Historian, author
- Known for: literature on education and historical events of Scotland

Walter Scott Dalgleish (25 March 1834 – 15 February 1897) was a British historian and author. His publications include Great Speeches from Shakespeare's Plays: with Notes and a Life of Shakespeare (1891), Great Britain and Ireland, 1689–1887 (1895) and Mediaeval England, from the English Settlement to the Reformation (1896).

He contributed a section on Scotland's education to Ordnance Gazetteer of Scotland (1901) by Francis Hindes Groome.

== Early life and career ==
Dalgleish was born in 1834, son of John Dalgleish. He attended Royal High School and University in Edinburgh.

He worked as an editor with Edinburgh publishers Thomas Nelson and Sons.

Dalgleish became the Edinburgh correspondent for The Times in 1878.

== Personal life ==
In 1870, Dalgleish married Charlotte Hill, daughter of painter David Octavius Hill. He later married Helen Curror, who survived him upon his death in 1897. She remarried, to Worthington Evans, the following year.

== Death ==
Dalgleish died in 1897, aged 62. He had been living at 25 Mayfield Terrace (or Parkside Works), Edinburgh.

== Selected bibliography ==
As author:

- Great Speeches from Shakespeare's Plays: with Notes and a Life of Shakespeare (1891)
- Great Britain and Ireland, 1689–1887 (1895)
- Mediaeval England, from the English Settlement to the Reformation (1896)

As contributor:

- Ordnance Gazetteer of Scotland (Francis Hindes Groome, 1901)

== See also ==
- English clause syntax
