= St Columba Church of Scotland, Glasgow =

Coordinates: 55.8629°N 4.2668°W

St Columba's Church
- The Parish Church of Saint Columba
- Eaglais Ghàidhlig Chaluim Chille
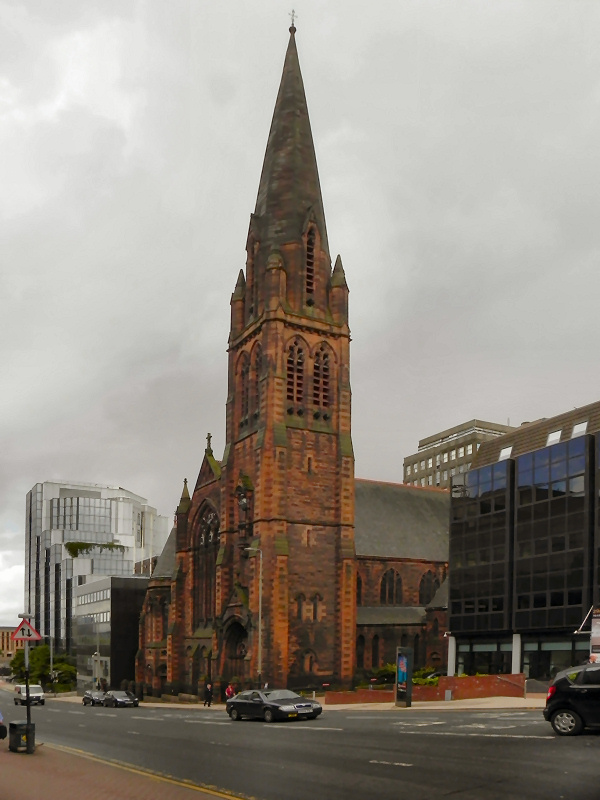
- St Columba's Church, St Vincent Street, Glasgow
- St Columba's Church
- Location: Glasgow
- Country: Scotland
- Denomination: Church of Scotland
- Website: Church Website

History
- Status: Parish church
- Dedication: St Columba

Architecture
- Architect(s): Tennant and Burke
- Architectural type: Church
- Style: Gothic Revival
- Years built: 1901-1904
- Completed: 17 September 1904
- Closed: April 2021

Administration
- Parish: St Columba's

Listed Building – Category A
- Designated: 15 December 1970
- Reference no.: LB33168

St Columba's Church is a Church of Scotland Parish church that used to serve a Gaelic congregation in Glasgow. The building was closed in 2021. The congregation moved to Blawarthill Parish Church.

== History ==
The Church of Scotland congregation of St Columba in Glasgow dates back to 1770. It was established to cater for the spiritual needs of the large number of Gaelic speakers from the Highlands and Islands of Scotland settling in Glasgow in search of employment. Until 2020, the church still had a weekly Sunday service in Gaelic, as well as weekly services in English.

Shortly before leaving Scotland to permanently emigrate to South Africa in 1903, Mull-born Gaelic poet Duncan Livingstone carved the inscription Tigh Mo Chridhe, Tigh Mo Gràidh ("House of My Heart, House of My Love") on the lintel of the main door of the church.

The church building in Glasgow's St Vincent Street was opened on Saturday 17 September 1904, and is built in the Gothic Revival style. It was designed by architects Tennant and Burke and was protected as a category B listed building starting in 1970. In 2022, its listing was upgraded to category A. Because of its size and association with Gaeldom and the Gaelic language it is also popularly known as the Highland Cathedral.

The St Vincent Street building replaced a church constructed in 1839 and situated on Hope Street (itself a replacement for the congregation's original premises on Ingram Street / Queen Street, the moves reflecting the general westward expansion of Glasgow during the era) which was demolished in 1900 for the expansion of Glasgow Central railway station. The new features of the terminus included an enlargement of the bridge over Argyle Street, which then became known as the Hielanman's Umbrella as some of the Gaelic community continued to gather there following the loss of the old church.

Past ministers have included two former Moderators of the General Assembly: the Very Rev. Dr. Norman MacLeod (minister 1835-1862) and husband of poetess Agnes Maxwell MacLeod, in 1836; and the Very Reverend Dr Alexander MacDonald (minister 1929-1954) in 1948.

On 16 February 2023 the congregation of St. Columba Church of Scotland was linked with the congregation of Blawarthill Parish Church of Scotland, with all future services to be held at Blawarthill Parish Church in Garscadden. The church building had not been in use since 2021 because of safety concerns. It was put up for sale by the Church of Scotland in 2022, and was sold in 2023. In November 2024, plans to repurpose it as a music and arts venue were reported.

The St. Columba and Blawarthill congregations were linked with Jordanhill Parish Church on 25 September 2025. The St Columba Gaelic congregation continues to meet weekly.

== See also ==
- List of Church of Scotland parishes
- Presbytery of Glasgow
- Gaelic-speaking congregations in the Church of Scotland
