= John Merry Ross =

John Merry Ross (1833–1883) was a Scottish academic writer and teacher. He was an expert on British poetry.

== Life ==
Ross was born in Kilmarnock on 21 April 1833, the third son of George Ross and his wife Agnes Merry. He was educated at Kilmarnock Academy. In 1851 he matriculated at Glasgow University studying English Literature and Classics.

Ross trained as a United Presbyterian minister but quit after three terms to instead be sub-editor of Chambers Encyclopedia. In 1866 he was appointed Senior English Master at the Royal High School, Edinburgh. In 1874 he was awarded an honorary doctorate by Glasgow University.

He contributed a section on Scotland's language and literature to Ordnance Gazetteer of Scotland (1901) by Francis Hindes Groome.

Ross lived his final years at 30 Great King Street in Edinburgh's Second New Town. He died in Edinburgh on 3 February 1883, aged 49, and was buried in Warriston Cemetery.

== Publications ==
- The Poetical Works of William Cowper (1863)
- Poems of John Milton (1871)
- Scottish History and Literature to the Period of the Reformation
