= Alexander Macdonald (Presbyterian minister) =

Scottish minister

Alexander Macdonald (1885–16 June 1960) was a Scottish minister who was Moderator of the General Assembly of the Church of Scotland in 1948.

== Early life ==
Macdonald was born in North Uist in 1885, and spoke Gaelic from his childhood. He studied at the University Glasgow and graduated with an arts degree. During this time, he was especially skilled at playing shinty. He trained for ministry at Glasgow Divinity Hall.

== Pastoral duties ==
He returned to his native Uist to be licensed in 1910. His first appointment was as assistant minister in Wishaw, then Logie. He then became minister of Invergarry and Kilmichael Glassary.

During World War I he was a chaplain with the 5th Battalion, Queen’s Own Cameron Highlanders, and the 7th Battalion, Seaforth Highlanders for a two-year period.

In 1921, he became minister of Stevenson High Church. Six years later, he moved to St Mungo's in Alloa. Following a two year appointment in Alloa, he was appointed to St Columba’s Church in Glasgow on 6 June 1929, which was noted for having a large percentage of the congregation from the Highlands due to its regular Gaelic worship.

He was Moderator of Presbytery of Glasgow from 1942 for a year. In 1944, his former university made him an honorary Doctor of Divinity. He was elected as Moderator of the General Assembly of the Church of Scotland in May 1948, for a one-year period of office. He retired from pastoral duties at St Columba's on 17 December 1954.

== Later life ==
Upon his retirement, he worshiped in Belmont and Hillhead Church.

He died in a hospital in Glasgow on 16 June 1960. His funeral was held on 19 June 1960 at his former charge of St Columba's Church in Glasgow, followed by his cremation at Glasgow Crematorium. He was survived by his wife (herself a daughter of the manse - Rev. D. Macaulay in Reay), as well as three sons - two of whom were also in ministry (Rev. W. Uist Macdonald based in Wallacetown Church, Dundee; and Rev. D. M Macdonald, based in Inverleith Church in Edinburgh).

== Awards and honours ==
He received an honorary Doctor of Divinity from Glasgow University in 1944.

Religious titles
Preceded by Matthew Stewart	Moderator of the General Assembly of the Church of Scotland; 1948–1949	Succeeded by George Duncan
