= Ordnance Gazetteer of Scotland: A Graphic and Accurate Description of Every Place in Scotland =

Work by Francis Hines Groome

- The book's title page
- Author: Francis Hindes Groome
- Language: English
- Genre: History
- Publisher: T. C. and E. C. Jack
- Publication date: 1901 (125 years ago)
- Publication place: United Kingdom
- Media type: Hardback book
- Pages: 1762
- OCLC: 1050257987

Ordnance Gazetteer of Scotland: A Graphic and Accurate Description of Every Place in Scotland is a book by Francis Hindes Groome. It was published in 1901, by T. C. and E. C. Jack of Edinburgh, combining six volumes (titled Ordnance Gazetteer of Scotland: A Survey of Scottish Topography, Statistical, Biographical, and Historical) written between 1884 and 1885, along with initial revisions made in 1895 and subsequent smaller revisions. It has entries for all of Scotland's cities, towns, villages and hamlets, beginning with Aven in today's Aberdeenshire and concluding with Zetland, the former name of Shetland. It also includes tourist attractions, historical sites and the histories of family names and clans.

In the book's closing 130-page "general survey" chapter, its sections are written by various notable contributors:

- the country's leading physical features was written by James Geikie
- the section on the history of Scotland was written by William Melven
- the sections on the country's position, boundaries, extent and area; population; industries; its mountains, lakes, rivers and islands; and administration were written by Hugh Alexander Webster
- the section on its transport system was by Thomas Allan Croal
- the sections on fishing, deer forests and grouse moors were by James G. Bertram
- James Landells compiled the agriculture portion
- the zoology section was contributed by John Gibson
- meteorology was provided by Alexander Buchan
- geology was by Ben Peach and John Horne
- its botany section was written by Thomas King
- its section on education was written by Walter Scott Dalgleish
- Scotland's ecclesiastical history was contributed by the Rev. John Reith, B. D.
- its Scottish language and literature section was by John Merry Ross
- the Gaelic language and literature portion was by the Rev. Archibald Clerk

Subtitled a "new edition", the book includes a 1901 United Kingdom census appendix and a map of Scotland by Collins Bartholomew.

Today, the book is available in full at the A Gazetteer for Scotland website. It also appears as part of The Gazetteer for Scotland, produced by the University of Edinburgh, Scotland, and is directly searchable within "A Vision of Britain through Time".

The original six volumes were published by Thomas C. Jack, of Edinburgh, London and Glasgow. They are archived at the National Library of Scotland.

== Composition ==
Upon the publication of the final volume of the initial survey in 1885, geographer John Scott Keltie wrote:

Most articles seem to us to have been written or revised on the spot, the only method by which accuracy can be secured. In some cases, however, we have noticed statements that could not have been made had this plan been invariably adopted.

— John Scott Keltie, Proceedings of the Royal Geographical Society and Monthly Record of Geography, Volume 7, New Geographical Publications, p. 616
