= Hamilton Old Parish Church =

Church building in South Lanarkshire, Scotland

Coordinates: 55.7762°N 4.03698°W

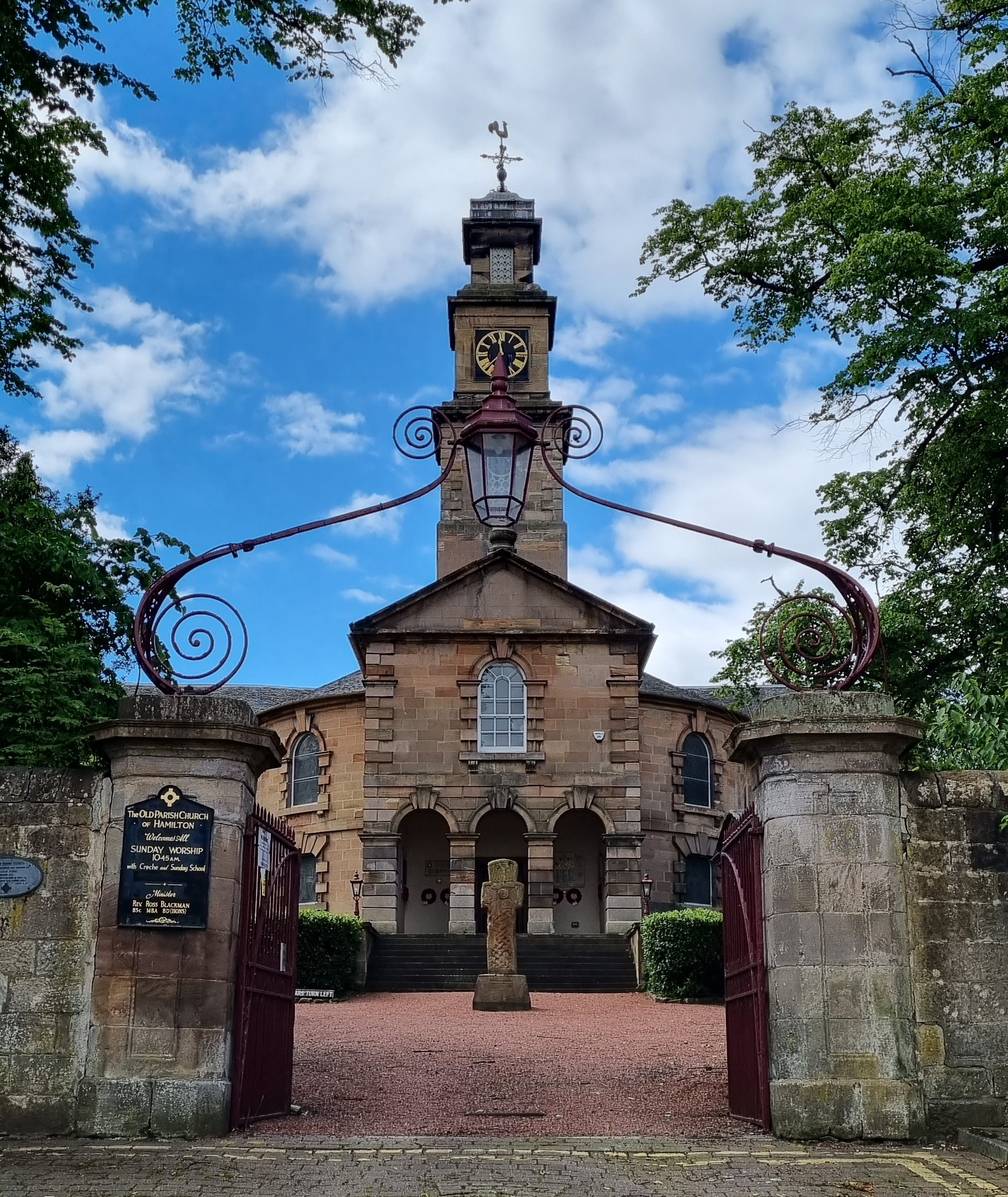
The front of Hamilton Old Parish Church seen from Cadzow Street

Hamilton Old Parish Church is a Church of Scotland parish church serving part of the Burgh of Hamilton in South Lanarkshire, Scotland. It is notable for its Georgian architecture and the church and grounds are Category A listed.

== History ==
The church was built between 1729 and 1732. It replaced the parish's 15th-century Collegiate Church, which was located at another site, close to the mausoleum in Strathclyde Park. The church is an unusual, largely circular design. The church was built to a design by William Adam. It is said to be the only church building to have been designed by him. The interior was recast in 1926.

The church contains a memorial to four covenantors executed in Edinburgh in 1666. The church contains a stained glass window by Ballantine and Gardiner, representing Jesus, Martha and Mary that was fitted in 1876 in memory of Mrs James Stevenson.

== Churchyard ==
The churchyard contains the Netherton Cross, an historic stone cross that dates to the 10th or 11th century. The cross is of red sandstone and is cited as a rare example of ecclesiastical sculpture from the former British early medieval Kingdom of Strathclyde. The cross was found in the grounds of Hamilton Palace and moved to the churchyard in 1926. The cross is reported to be under threat due to years of weathering.

The churchyard also contains several Covenanters memorials. Several of the graves are stated to be burials from the Battle of Bothwell Bridge.

The entrance to the churchyard from Cadzow street is marked by coped sandstone walls and entrance gatepiers. The grounds of the churchyard cemetery are open to visitors but burials no longer take place.

== Ministers ==
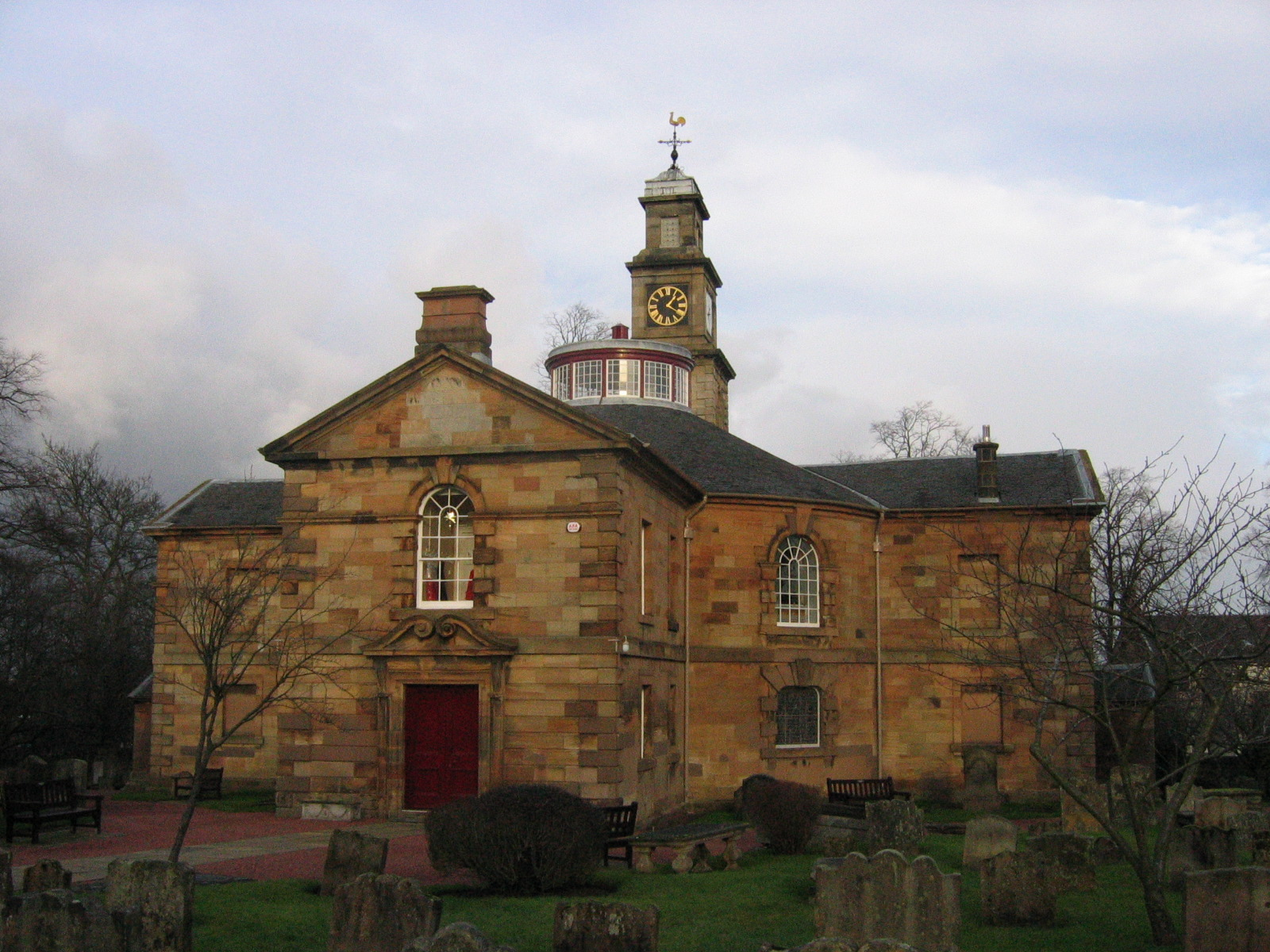
The Old Parish Church from the rear

The current minister is the Reverend Ross Blackman BSc MBA BD(Honours), who was ordained and inducted on 19 November 2015. Mr Blackman studied at Highland Theological College and University of Glasgow. The previous ministers include: Rev John Thomson (2001–2014), and Rev Dr Hugh Wyllie, who was Moderator of the General Assembly of the Church of Scotland in 1992. Dr Wyllie is one of three ministers of Hamilton Old to have served as Moderator of the General Assembly since the end of the Second World War, the others being Matthew Stewart in 1947 and John Fraser in 1958.

Until 1960 this was a collegiate charge with two ministers. After this date John McKechnie, who had been minister of the second charge, became minister of the united charge. There were also two buildings - the Old Church and Auchingramont Church. Auchingramont Church was closed during the ministry of Douglas Macnaughton, who succeeded John McKechnie.

== See also ==
- List of Church of Scotland parishes
