= Robert Groome =

English cleric and archdeacon

Robert Hindes Groome (18 January 1810 – 19 March 1889) was an English Anglican churchman, who became Archdeacon of Suffolk. He wrote several short stories that were set in Suffolk.

== Life ==
Groome was born at Framlingham in 1810, the second son of the Rev. John Hindes Groome, formerly fellow of Pembroke College, Cambridge, and rector for 27 years of Earl Soham and Monk Soham in Suffolk.

He was educated at Norwich under Richard Valpy and Howes, and at Caius College, Cambridge, where he graduated BA in 1832, and MA in 1836. In 1833 he was ordained to the Suffolk curacy of Tannington-with-Brundish. During 1835 he travelled in Germany as tutor to the son of Juan Álvarez Mendizábal, the Spanish financier. In 1839 he became curate of Corfe Castle, Dorset, of which little borough he was mayor for a year. In 1845 he succeeded his father as Rector of Monk Soham, where in the course of 44 years, he built the rectory and the village school, restored the old church, erected an organ, and rehung the bells. In 1858 he was appointed an honorary canon of Norwich, and from 1869 to 1887 served as Archdeacon of Suffolk. Failing eyesight forced him to resign, at which point 186 clergy of the diocese presented him with his portrait by William R. Symonds. He died at Monk Soham on 19 March 1889.

== Cultured friends ==
Groome was a man of wide culture and many friends. Notable among these were Edward Fitzgerald, William Bodham Donne, Dr. William Hepworth Thompson, the master of Trinity, and Henry Bradshaw, the Cambridge librarian, who said of him: "I never see Groome but what I learn something from him." He read much, but published little: a couple of charges, one or two sermons and lectures, some hymns and hymn-tunes, and articles in the Christian Advocate and Review, of which he was editor from 1861 to 1866. He is remembered by his short Suffolk stories, "The Only Darter", "Master Charlie" and others, a collection of which appeared shortly after his death. For real humour and tenderness these come near to "Rab and his Friends".

== Personal matters ==
In 1843 he married Mary, the third daughter of Rev. J. L. Jackson, Rector of St Mary's Church, Swanage, and Louisa Decima Wollaston. They had eight children, of whom four sons and two daughters survived him.
