= Archibald Clerk =

Scottish minister and Gaelic scholar

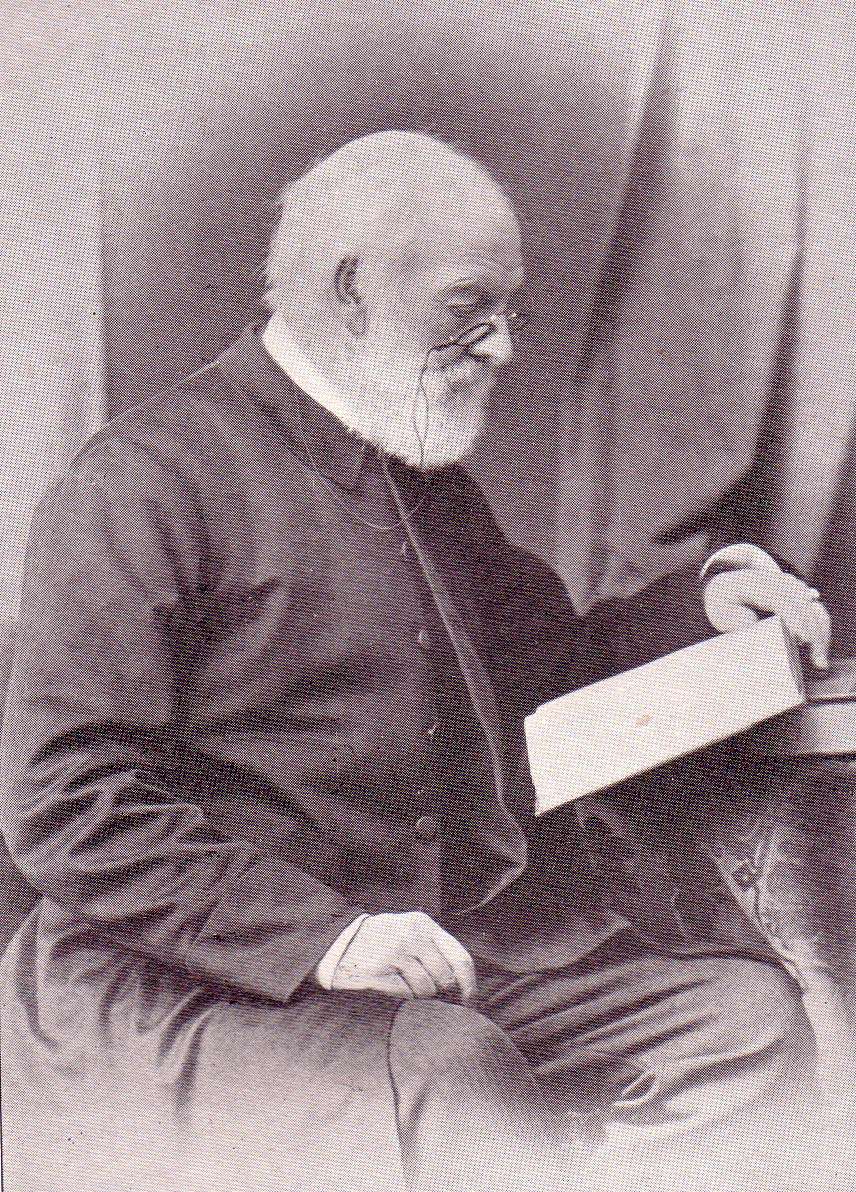
Portrait of the Rev Archibald Clerk

Archibald Clerk (1813–1887) was a minister of the established Church of Scotland and one of the leading Gaelic scholars of the Victorian era.

== Biography ==
Archibald Clerk was the elder son of Duncan Clerk, a farmer on the Argyll island of Lismore and his wife Margaret Carmichael. Admitted to Glasgow University at the age of 13, Clerk studied the Classics and was licensed as a minister in 1835, aged 22.

He became Assistant Minister at St Columba’s Kirk in Glasgow under the guidance of The Rev Norman MacLeod (1783-1862) otherwise known as Caraid nan Gaidheal, a leading member of the Gaelic intelligencia. Clerk married MacLeod’s daughter, Jessie, in 1840 and together they had eleven children.

He became Minister of Acharacle in 1838 before moving to Duirinish on the Island of Skye in 1840 where he wrote that parish’s entry in the New Statistical Account of Scotland of 1845.

In 1844 Clerk was called to what was then the biggest parish in Scotland, the Parish of Kilmallie, then partly in Argyll and partly in Inverness-shire. The previous minister, Thomas Davidson, had come out of the established church during the Disruption of 1843, and taken two thirds of the congregation with him to the Free Church of Scotland. Clerk inherited a situation where bitterness over the religious arguments was exacerbated by hostility to the heritors, or landlords, over evictions of highland peasants from their landholdings. An ecclesiastical moderate and a conciliator by nature, Clerk worked hard in the following forty-three years to build bridges and ameliorate ill feelings.

During the potato famine that afflicted the Highlands in the late 1840s Clerk collaborated with his father-in-law, the Rev Norman MacLeod on famine relief schemes.

Clerk edited “Fear-tathaich nam Beann”, the Gaelic supplement of the Church of Scotland’s magazine, “Life and Work”. In 1855 he published a "Memoir of Colonel John Cameron of Fassiefern", an important commander in The Duke of Wellington’s army, killed at Quatre Bras on the eve of The Battle of Waterloo. He worked with Dr T. MacLachlan to publish a corrected version of the Gaelic bible in 1880. As minister of Kilmallie he ensured that Gaelic teaching took place in the schools under his supervision. He edited the poems of Ossian in Gaelic with a translation into English (1870) and was awarded an honorary LL.D by Glasgow University.Alexander Carmichael collected Ossianic fragments for Clerk. Both men, but especially Clerk, believed in the authenticity of MacPherson's Ossian Clerk was among the clergy approached by the Royal Society of Edinburgh to help with their study of erratic boulders as they sought to prove that Scotland had been subject to glaciation. His help is acknowledged in the Society's reports. He did some of this work with Colin Livingstone, head teacher of Fort William Secondary School, who was the lead researcher in the district on this matter.

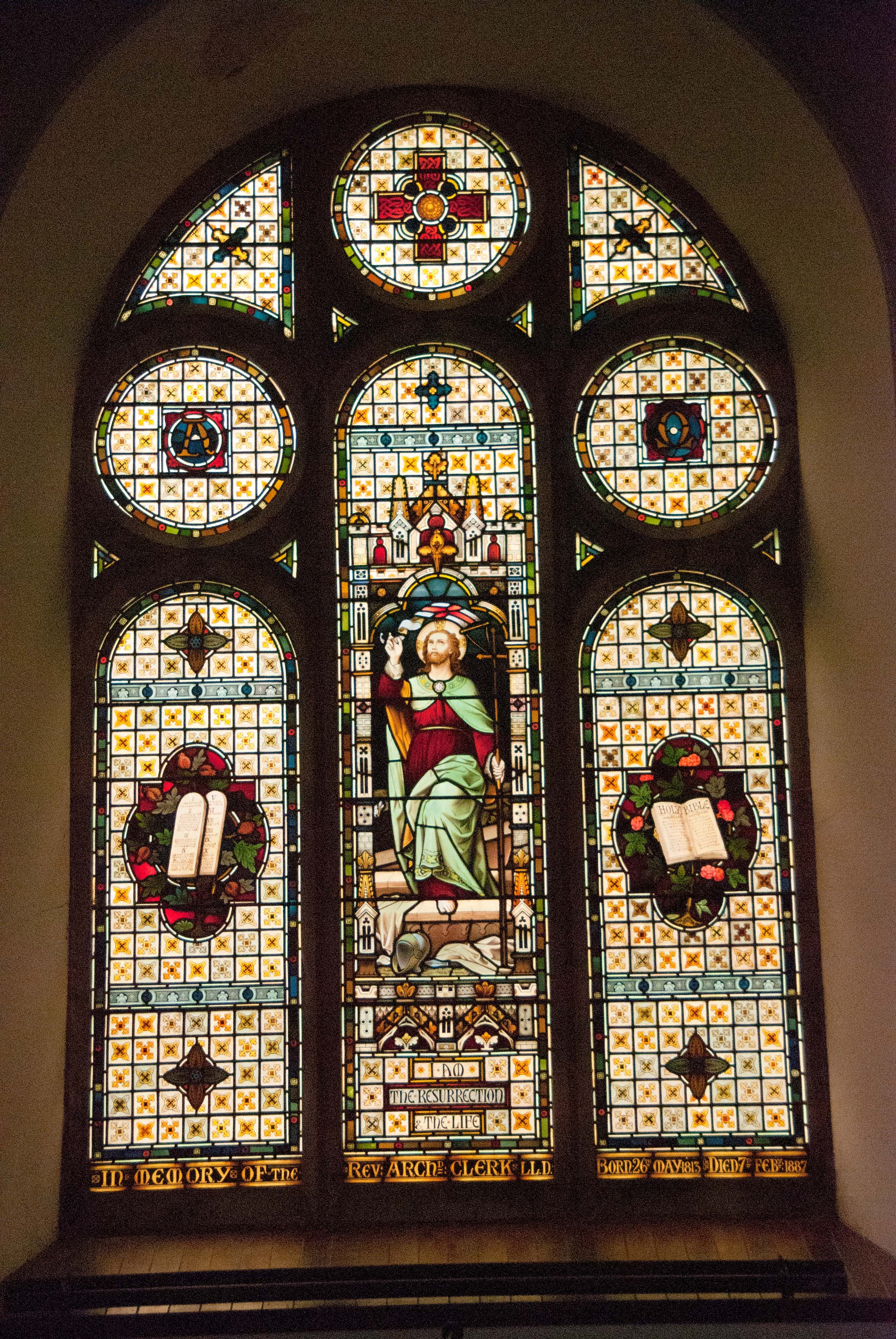
Memorial window to Archibald Clerk, Kilmallie Parish Church, Corpach.

Clerk died on 7 February 1887 and is buried in Kilmallie churchyard in Corpach near Fort William. There is a memorial stained glass window by to him in Kilmallie Church. Jessie, his wife, died in 1897 and is buried beside him. His diaries are now held in the Lochaber Archive, Lochaber College, University of the Highlands and Islands.

== See also ==
- Ordnance Gazetteer of Scotland: A Graphic and Accurate Description of Every Place in Scotland (Clerk contributed its section on Scotland's Gaelic language and literature)

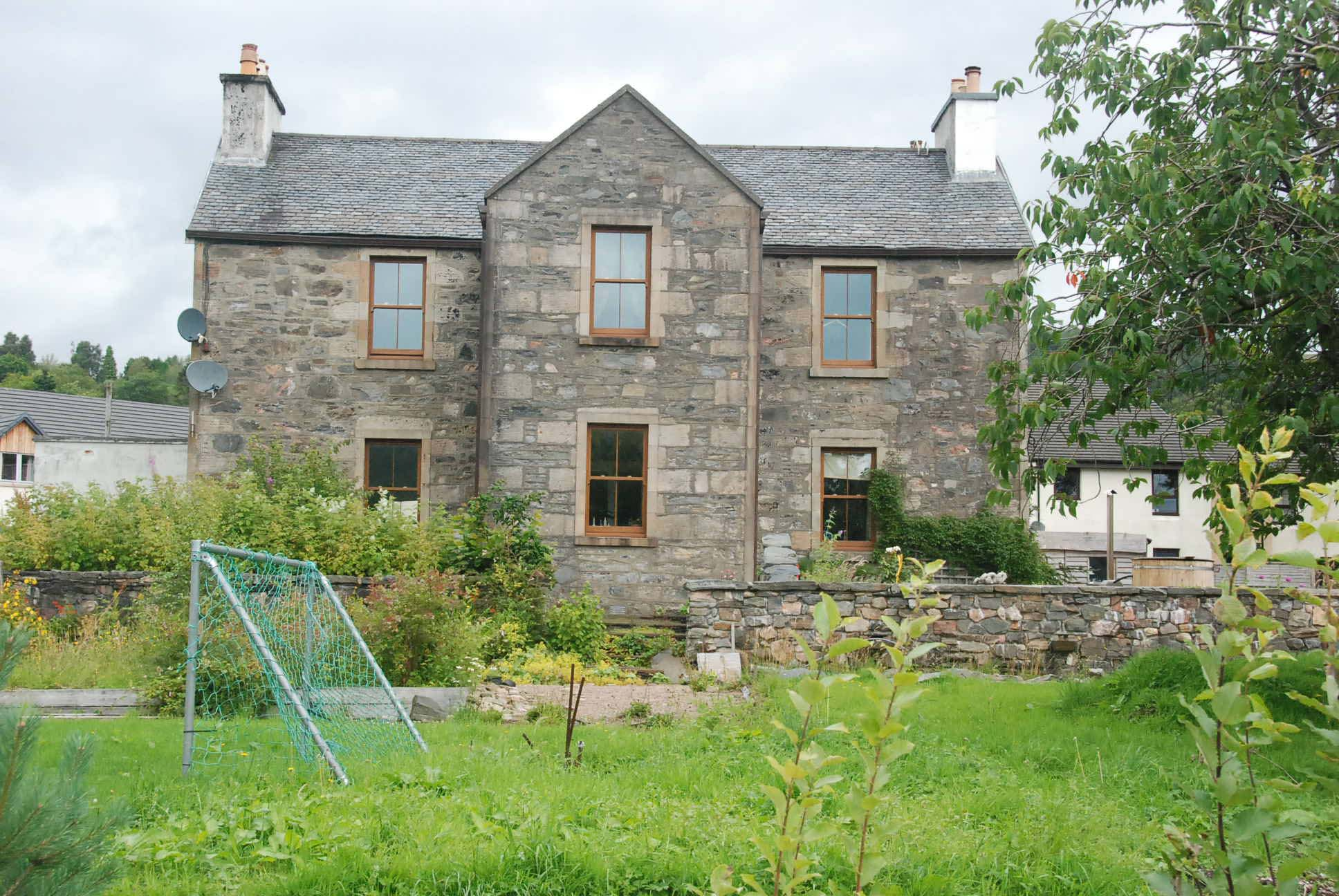
The old Kilmallie Manse where Archibald Clerk lived

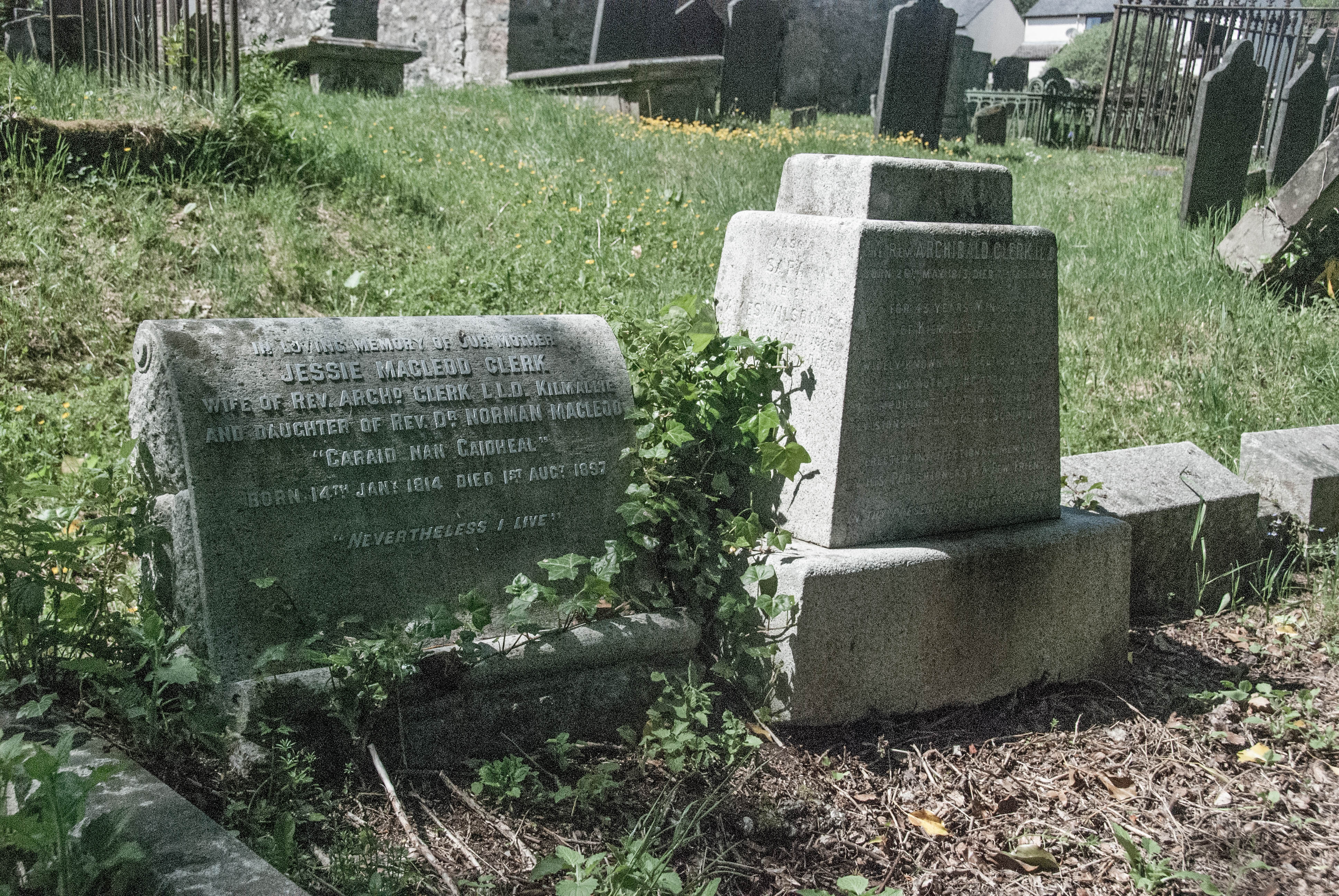
Graves in old Kilmallie cemetery of Dr Archibald Clerk (right) and his wife Jessie
