= Matthew Stewart (moderator) =

Scottish minister

Matthew Stewart (1 January 1881–1952) was a Scottish minister who served as Moderator of the General Assembly of the Church of Scotland in 1947.

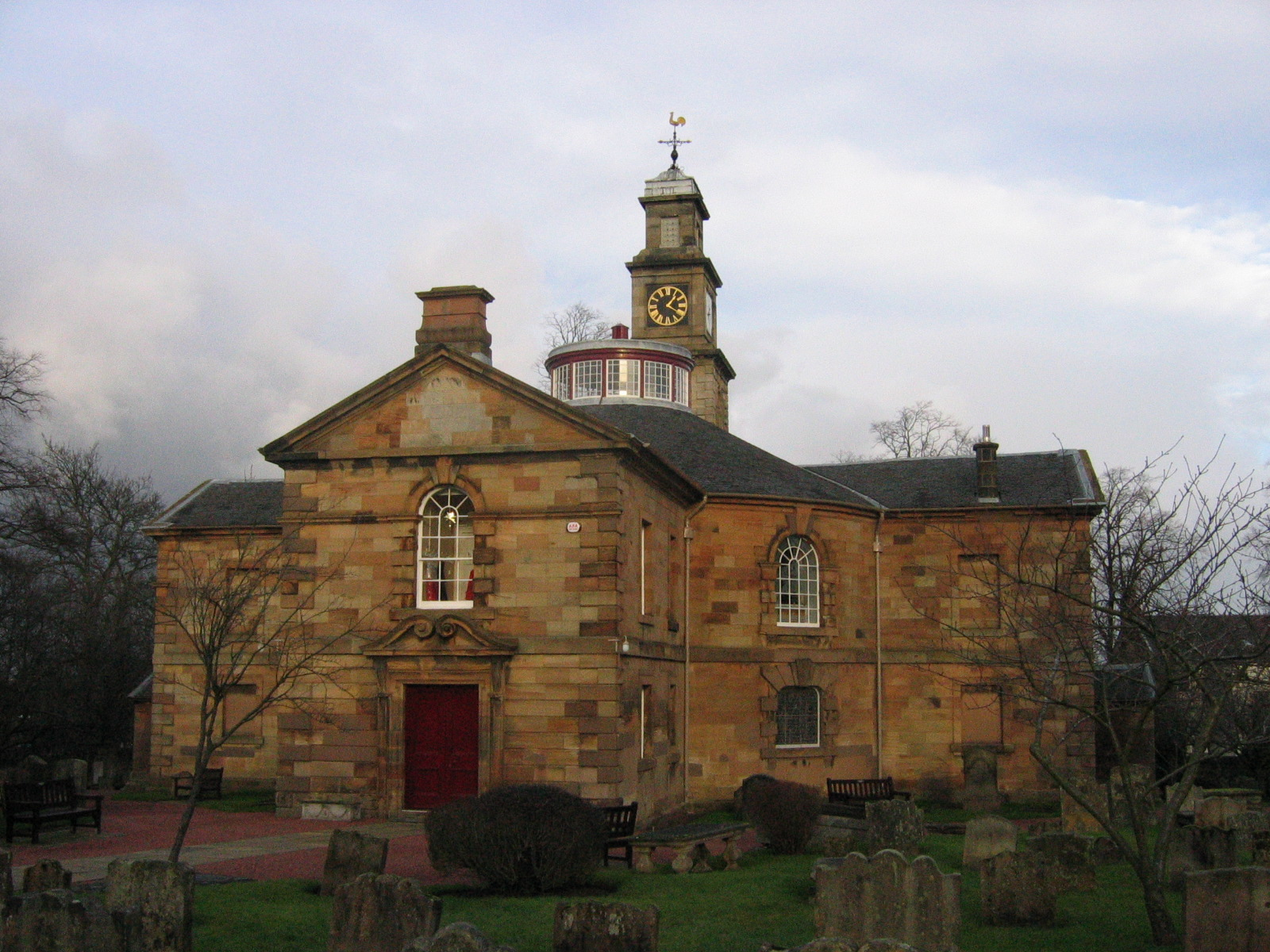
The Old Parish Church from the rear

== Life ==
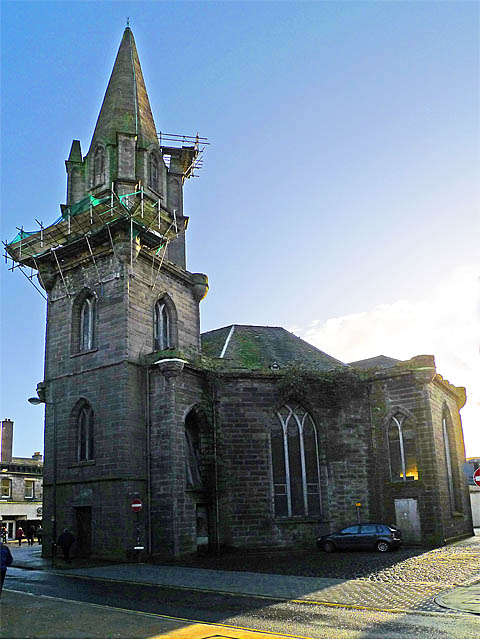
St Paul's Church, Perth

Stewart was born on New Year's Day, 1 January 1881.

He first studied a general Classics degree at the University of Glasgow graduating with an MA (Hons) in 1902, and then a Snell Exhibitioner at Balliol College, Oxford, graduating with a BA in 1906. He returned to Scotland with a MacKenzie Scholarship with which he studied theology at Divinity Hall in Glasgow, graduating with a BD in 1909.

He was licensed to preach by the Presbytery of Glasgow and first served as an assistant at Pollokshields. In 1911, he moved to Blackfriars Church, Glasgow.

In 1912 he was ordained as minister of St Paul's Church in Perth. He transferred to Keith in 1914. After 12 years in Keith he made an unusual move back to "second charge" in Hamilton Old Parish Church in 1926, and became minister (first charge) in 1930. He resigned in 1948.

His additional roles included Chaplain to the 6th Gordon Highlanders during World War I. He lectured in Pastoral Theology at the University of Aberdeen and the University of Glasgow. He was active in the Church Courts.

In 1944 the University of Glasgow awarded him an honorary doctorate (DD). He was elected Moderator of the Church of Scotland in 1948, and was succeeded by Alexander Macdonald.

He died in 1952.
