= Alexander Francis Lydon =

English painter

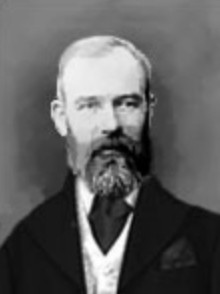
- Born: 1836/1837; Ireland
- Died: 20 March 1917 (aged 79–81)
- Known for: Engraving

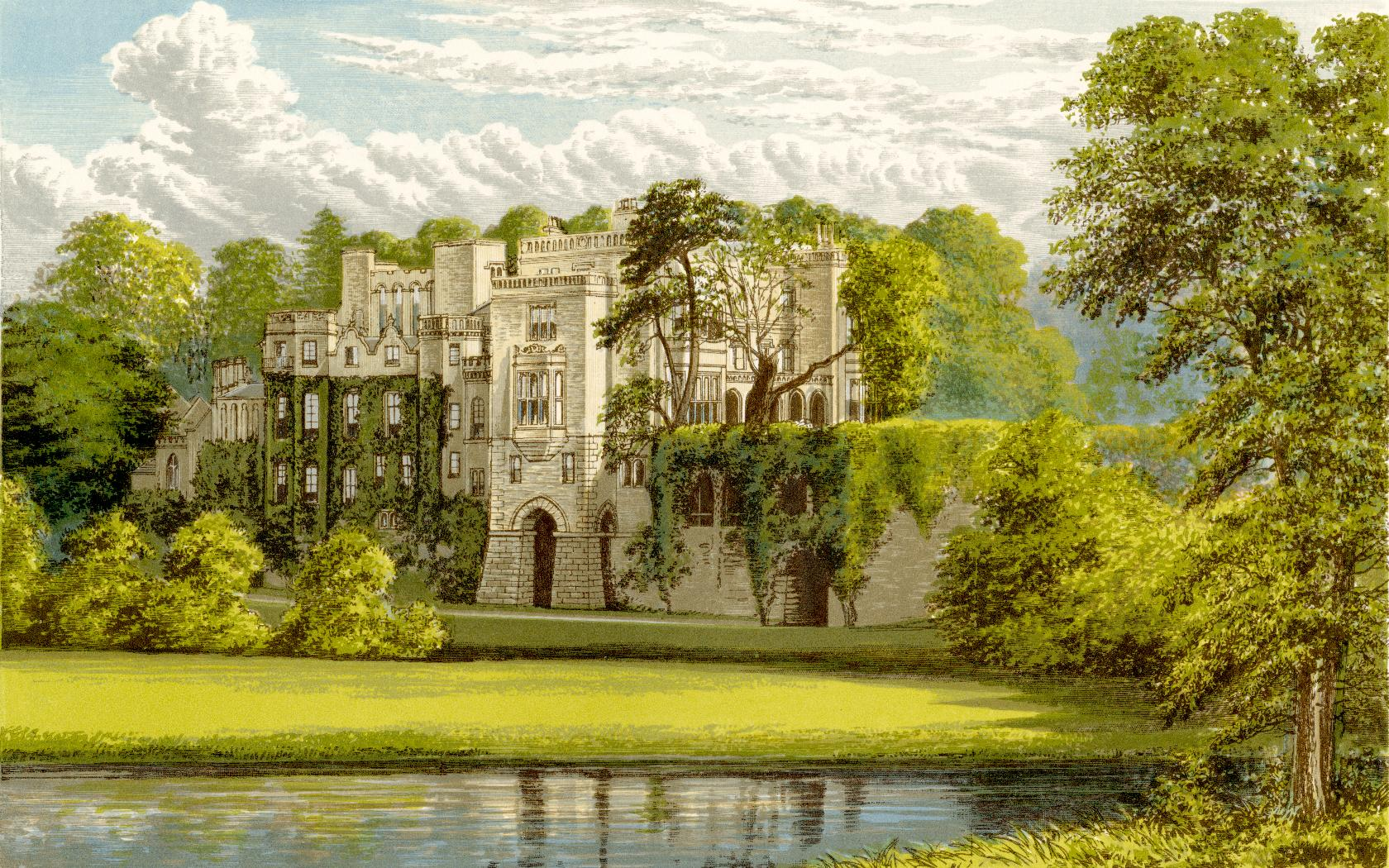
Guy's Cliffe, Warwick, Warwickshire from the book County Seats of The Noblemen and Gentlemen of Great Britain and Ireland

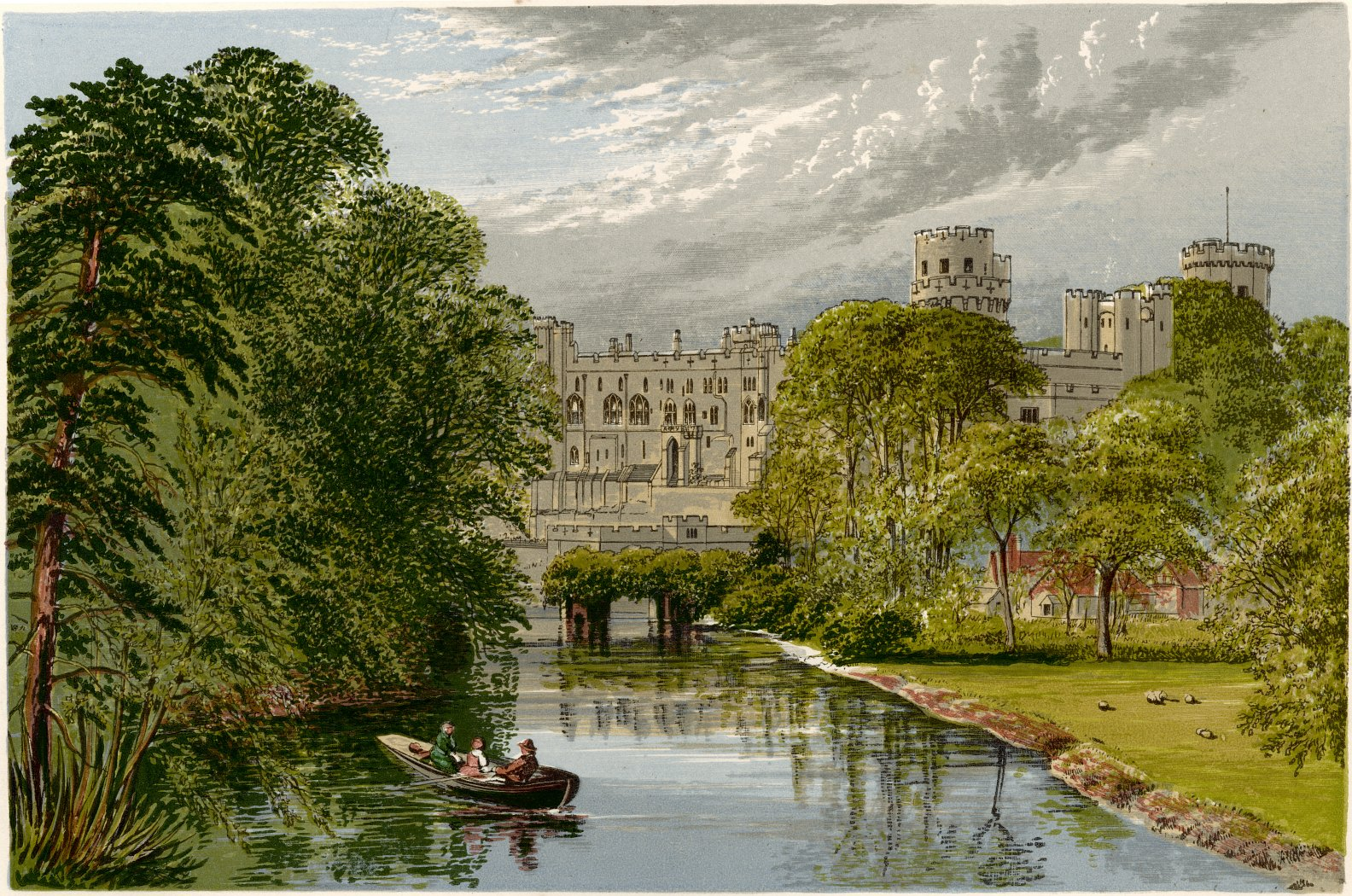
Warwick Castle, Warwick, Warwickshire from the book County Seats of The Noblemen and Gentlemen of Great Britain and Ireland

Alexander Francis Lydon (/ˈlaɪdən/ LY-dən; 1836/1837 – 1917) was an Irish-born British watercolour artist, illustrator and engraver of natural history and landscapes. He worked for Benjamin Fawcett the printer, to whom he had been apprenticed from an early age. He collaborated on a large number of works with the Rev. Francis Orpen Morris who wrote the text.

A census on 30 March 1851 found the Lydon family living at Bridge Street, Great Driffield and the following details were recorded:

- Head of household Patrick Lydon, born in Ireland, married, aged 42, Chelsea Pensioner and Relieving Officer of Driffield Union.
- Elizabeth Lydon, wife, aged 38, birthplace Portugal.
- Francis Lydon, son, aged 14, printer's assistant, birthplace Dublin.
- Frederic Lydon, son, aged 12, scholar, birthplace Bermuda, West Indies.
- Hannah Lydon, daughter, aged 10, scholar, birthplace Bermuda, West Indies.
- James Lydon, son, aged 7, scholar, birthplace New Brunswick, Canada.
- Margaret Lydon, daughter, aged 2, birthplace Newcastle, Northumberland.
- John Lydon, son, aged 8 months, birthplace Great Driffield.
- Catherine Lydon, sister, unmarried, aged 18, birthplace Ireland.

Alexander's grandson, Gerald Kenneth Lydon (1902–1988), known professionally as GK Lydon, was also a successful artist specialising in watercolours. He was elected a Fellow of the Royal Society of Arts in 1953.

== Bibliography (selected) ==
Illustrated and/or engraved by Lydon

- Couch, Jonathan. A history of the fishes of the British Islands: Vol. 1, Vol. 2, Vol. 3, Vol. 4 (London, Groombridge and Sons, 1862).
- Lowe, E. J. Our native ferns, or, A history of the British species and their varieties: Vol. 1, Vol. 2 (London: Groombridge, 1865).
- Bunyan, John. The pilgrim's progress: from this world to that which is to come (London: Groombridge and Sons, 1871).
- Houghton, W. British fresh water fishes: Vol. 1, Vol 2 (London: W. Mackenzie, 1879).
- Croal, Thomas Allan. Scottish loch scenery (London: J. Walker, 1882).
- Morris, F. O. A series of picturesque views of seats of the noblemen and gentlemen of Great Britain and Ireland: Vol. 1, Vol. 2, Vol. 3, Vol. 4, Vol. 5, Vol. 6 (London: William Mackenzie).
- Greene, W T. Parrots in captivity (George Bell & Sons, 1884).
- Kearton, Richard. Birds' nests, eggs and egg-collecting (Cassell & Co., 1896).

== Sources ==
- The Illustrator and the Book in England from 1790 to 1914. Gordon Norton Ray, Courier Dover Publications, 1992, p. 65; ISBN 0-486-26955-8
- Selection of Lydon's illustrations of natural history and landscapes, finerareprints.com. Accessed 28 December 2022.
- Lydon's fern illustrations in Ferns: British and exotic v.1, flickr.com. Accessed 28 December 2022.
