= Notes on the Surgery of the War in Crimea =

Scottish medical textbook

- Exterior view of Scottish edition 1858
- Author: G.H.B. MacLeod
- Language: English
- Release number: 1st in series
- Genre: Medical textbook
- Set in: Crimean War
- Publisher: J.B. Lippincot (Scotland)
- Publication date: May 1858
- Publication place: Scotland
- Pages: 493

Notes on the Surgery of the War in Crimea is a well received medical textbook written by Scottish physician George Husband Baird MacLeod that was a culmination of his experiences during the Crimean War. An American edition was published by the same company in 1862. The work provides a detailed description and treatment of the types of gunshot wounds that occurred during the Crimean War.

== Description ==
The first chapter of the book covers the medical topography of the Crimea and the second covers the drainage, water supply and sanitary conditions in the camp where Macleod was stationed. The next chapter is an account of the Bulgarian campaign and its effects on the health of the British Army. The next chapter, Chapter IV, highlights the differences between surgery in civilian life as compared to army life. Chapter V is the beginning of the descriptions on the types of gunshot wounds suffered by the British Army soldier and their treatment. Chapter VI describes the use of chloroform in the Crimea, the treatment of haemorrhage caused by the gunshot and the diseases that occurred following gunshot that included Tetanus, Gangrene, Erysipelas as well as Frostbite. More than 20,000 soldiers were administered chloroform before treatment of gunshot wound.

== Surgical record ==
The latter contents of the book provide a series of chapters that constitute a surgical record of different gunshot wound types, categorised across the body, on soldiers that Macleod operated on. These soldiers, often young but tall and fast growing were shot at a prodigious rate. Another fact that accounted for the wounds, was the large rifle bullets used by each side. On the British side, the Enfield rifle fired bullets weighing 1 ounze and two scruples (30.94 grammes) while the Russian rifle fired bullets weighing 1 ounze and 6 drachms (51.67 grammes). The impact of such large bullets invariably led to complete destruction of the bone, termed "Comminution" (meaning particulation) that would result in an amputation.

The remainder of the work is occupied by six chapters on injuries of the head, wounds of the face and chest, gunshot wounds of the abdomen and bladder, compound fracture of the extremities, gunshot wounds of joints, and amputations.

In the chapter on amputations, the evidence was clear that primary amputation, the removal of the limb within 48 hours was more effective at saving the soldiers life, than secondary amputation, which was removing the limb after the 48 hour period.
