= Robert John Harvey Gibson =

Robert John Harvey Gibson CBE FRSE FLS DL JP (2 November 1860 – 3 June 1929) was a Scottish botanist and academic author. In literature his name often appears as R. J. Harvey-Gibson.

== Life ==
He was born on 2 November 1860, the son of Rev Robert Gibson of the Scottish Episcopal Church. He was educated at Aberdeen Grammar School. He then studied at, consecutively, the University of Aberdeen, the University of Edinburgh and the University of Strasbourg.

After first working as a demonstrator in botany at the University of Edinburgh, he received a post at University College, Liverpool, and thereafter spent most of his working life there, rising to professor of botany in 1894. The college later became the University of Liverpool. During his tenure he designed and oversaw the creation of the Hartley Botanical Institute.

In 1885 he was elected a fellow of the Royal Society of Edinburgh, his proposers were William Abbott Herdman, Sir John Murray, James Geikie and Patrick Geddes. He resigned in 1894 and was re-elected in 1914 his proposers wereWilliam Abbott Herdman, Frederick Orpen Bower, James Geikie and Cargill Gilston Knott.

He acted as examiner for the Pharmaceutical Society of Great Britain.

On 4 March 1914, he was appointed a deputy lieutenant of Lancashire. In the First World War he served as a lieutenant colonel in the South African Military Command and received a Military CBE for his services in 1919.

He retired in 1921 and spent time in both Grasmere and Leamington before settling in Glasgow. He died there on 3 June 1929.

== Family ==
In 1887 he married Eda Lawrie, daughter of Rev J Lawrie and granddaughter of Adam Black, late Lord Provost of Edinburgh.

== Publications ==
The standard author abbreviation Harv.-Gibs. is used to indicate this person as the author when citing a botanical name.

- A Revised List of Marine Algae (1891)
- Contributions Towards a Knowledge of the Anatomy of the Genus Selaginella (1896)
- Codium (1900)
- He translated Dr. Ludwig Jost's 1904 publication Lectures on Plant Physiology (1907)
- The Motor Car: what It Is and How to Drive It (1917)
- Outlines of the History of Botany (1919)
- A Short History of Botany (1926)
- A Textbook of Elementary Biology

== See also ==
- Ordnance Gazetteer of Scotland: A Graphic and Accurate Description of Every Place in Scotland (Gibson contributed its section on Scotland's zoology)
