= Hugh Alexander Webster =

Scottish encyclopaedist (1849–1926)

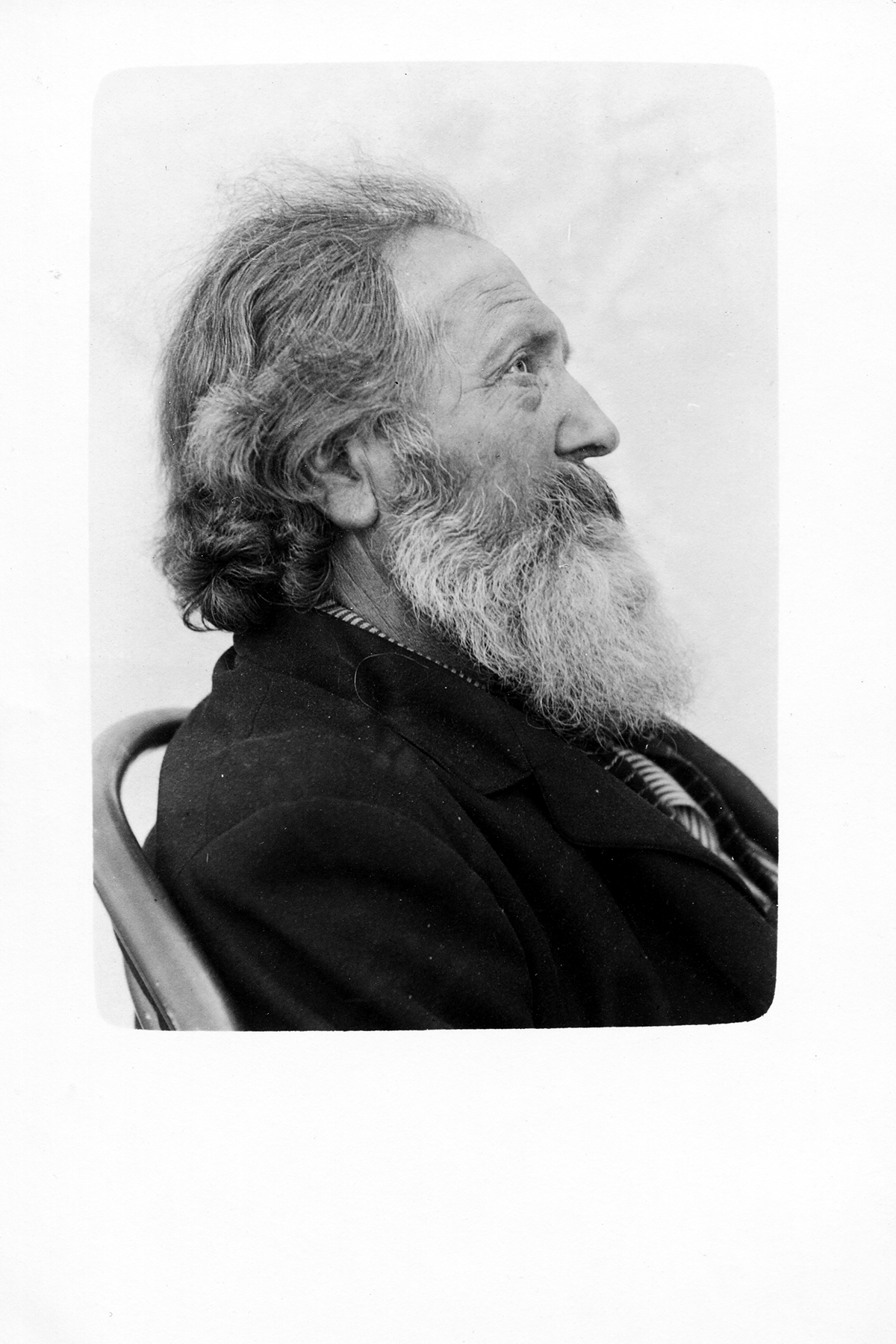
- Hugh Alexander Webster c. 1920
- Born: 1849; Laurencekirk, Kincardineshire, United Kingdom
- Died: 7 January 1926 (aged 76–77); Edinburgh, United Kingdom
- Resting place: Joppa Cemetery, Edinburgh
- Education: Edinburgh University
- Scientific career
- Fields: English Literature, Geography
- Workplaces: Librarian, Edinburgh University

Notes
- Fellow of the Royal Society of Edinburgh (1880) Founder and first fellow of the Scottish Geographical Society

Professor Hugh Alexander Webster FRSE, FRSGS (1849 – 7 January 1926) was a Scottish teacher, librarian and encyclopaedist.

== Biography ==
The son of Rev David Webster and Isabella McKinnon, Hugh Webster was born in Laurencekirk, Kincardineshire, and educated first privately by his father and later at Edinburgh University (1878–80). He became a teacher at Merchiston Castle Academy and later Librarian at the University.

He was a member of a group of encyclopaedists working in Edinburgh in the late 19th century including William Robertson Smith (editor of the Encyclopædia Britannica and contributor to the Encyclopaedia Biblica); David Patrick (editor of Chambers's Encyclopaedia, Chambers's Biographical Dictionary, and Chambers's Cyclopaedia of English Literature); J Sutherland Black (editor of Encyclopaedia Biblica); George Sandeman, (editor in chief of Nelson's Encyclopaedia) and Patrick Geddes.

Hugh Webster was fluent in fourteen languages which allowed him to access sources from European and Asian writers.

Patrick Geddes, writing from Montpellier in 1926 said:

"In my young days in Edinburgh, some five and forty years ago, I was fortunate in knowing and working for the brilliant group of encyclopedists then so active, and among whom Robertson Smith, Sutherland Black and David Patrick of Chamber's, are best remembered. But besides these three mighty men, there were other widely cultivated and able scholars and writers; and among these, to my mind, the very first of all was Hugh Webster. His varied interests were the expression of a widely sympathetic nature, with its openness widely rewarded by a wealth of knowledge: and his conversation was thus always bright, fresh and original - indeed often fascinating! Geography was thus to him as living as if he had known its scenes from travel, history as if he had lived through it and literature as if he had collaborated in its production."

Geddes also reported a comment from his friend and colleague George Sandeman

in his editing of Nelson's Encyclopaedia, Webster was his most able and valued co-adjutor.

Hugh Webster was one of four sub-editors of the 9th edition of the Encyclopædia Britannica, published in 1888 and known as "The Scholar's Edition". He authored the articles on Borneo, the Celebes islands, Colombia, Korea, the Danube, the Druse people of Syria, Ecuador, Frankfort-on-the-Main, Geneva, Guiana, Hainan, the Indian archipelago, Italy, Java, Montenegro, the river Niger, the river Nile, Patagonia, The Philippines, Réunion, Rio de Janeiro, the Sahara, Sierra Leone, and Sumatra.

Hugh Webster was elected a Fellow of the Royal Society of Edinburgh FRSE on 2 May 1887 proposed by Sir John Murray, William Evans Hoyle, Robert Gray, Alexander Buchan. His election was cancelled in 1896–7.

He was a founder member and the first Honorary Fellow of the Scottish Geographical Society and edited the Society's magazine for several years.

Hugh Webster had intense powers of mental application and was quite capable of forgetting both time and place. He was also generous to those who were less fortunate, a trait he attributed to his experiences when his father was Chaplain to the Poorhouse and Prison in Linlithgow.

[Francis Hindes Groome's] first work was on the 'Globe Encyclopædia,’ edited by Dr. John Ross. Even at that time he was very delicate and subject to long wearisome periods of illness. During his work on the 'Globe' he fell seriously ill in the middle of the letter S. Things were going very badly with him; but they would have gone much worse had it not been for the affection and generosity of his friend and colleague Prof. H. A. Webster, who, in order to get the work out in time, sat up night after night in Groome’s room, writing articles on Sterne, Voltaire, and other subjects.

Hugh Webster became an alcoholic. The University granted him several furloughs but in the end he developed delirium tremens, had a breakdown, lost his job as Librarian and was confined to home. He lived in London for some years in reduced circumstances, and then returned to Edinburgh to live with his daughter Maud and her husband John Janes. Somewhere in this period he stopped drinking.

In his later years he used to take students from the university to prepare them for the Entrance Examination in English. These were mainly from India, China, Korea and Africa.

== Personal life ==
Webster was the son of the Rev David Webster and Isabella McKinnon. He married Mary Fyfe Clark (1850–1919), daughter of Alexander Clark in 1878. In 1890 they are listed as living in quarters at Old College on Edinburgh University grounds. Around 1900, with a growing family, they moved to 3 John Street in Portobello just east of the city. By 1910 they had left Edinburgh.

They later lived for many years in Duddingston, Portobello, Edinburgh. He was survived by two of his six children, Maud and Frieda.

== See also ==
- Ordnance Gazetteer of Scotland: A Graphic and Accurate Description of Every Place in Scotland (Webster contributed five sections)
