= Norman Macleod (Caraid nan Gaidheal) =

Norman MacLeod
- Born: 1783
- Died: 1862 (aged 78–79)
- Other names: Caraid nan Gàidheal
- Children: Rev. Norman MacLeod
- Parent: Rev. Norman MacLeod
- Church: Church of Scotland

Norman MacLeod, known in Gaelic as Caraid nan Gàidheal ("friend of the Gael"), was a Church of Scotland minister, poet, and writer. He was Chaplain to Queen Victoria and Dean of the Chapel Royal in Scotland.

== Life ==
He was the son of the Rev. Norman Macleod, D.D. (1745 – 1824), and father of the Rev. Norman Macleod (1812 – 1872).

MacLeod was a distinguished minister of the Scottish Church, and studied at Edinburgh. He was licensed to preach by the Presbytery of Mull in 1806. He became one of the most distinguished ministers, and most popular preachers of his Church, becoming Moderator of the General Assembly of the Church of Scotland in 1836. He was Dean of the Chapel Royal and a trusted friend of Queen Victoria. He preached to Queen Victoria and Prince Albert during their second visit to Scotland in 1844.

He was an enormously influential writer of Gaelic prose, founding and editing two of the earliest Gaelic periodicals, An Teachdaire Gaelach (The Highland Messenger) (1829–32) and Cuairtear nan Gleann (The Traveller of the Glens) (1840–43), as well as later contributing to Fear-Tathaich nam Beann (The Mountaineer) (1848) edited by his son in law, the Rev. Archibald Clerk. He was an enthusiastic proponent of Gaelic education and the welfare of Highlanders. As a smooth operator in church politics he secured the support of the General Assembly of the Church of Scotland for a Highland education scheme in 1824, with the purpose of teaching the people of the Highlands and Islands to read the Bible, catechism and other material in their native Gaelic. Within a few years these schools had an attendance in excess of 22,000, while other Gaelic Schools Societies and the Society in Scotland for Propagating Christian Knowledge (SSPCK) were similarly bringing literacy in Gaelic to many more.

MacLeod published a 'reader' for the General Assembly Schools in 1828. This, the periodicals, and a further collection of writings published in 1834 as Leabhar nan Cnoc (The Book of the Hills subtitled 'things old and new for the education and improvement of the Gael') covered a very wide range of material, from discussion of Chartists, Luddites and electoral reform to volcanoes and the natural world, encompassing subjects as diverse as politics, religion, current affairs, popular science, emigration, animal husbandry, technological developments and city life. Much of it was humorous, and written in the form of soap opera-like sketches and letters 'home'.

He conducted a preaching tour in Ireland in the 1830s - not in English, but to Irish-speaking districts using his own Gaelic. In conjunction with Presbyterians in Belfast he made a translation into Irish of the metrical psalms, although it has to be said the text is an odd hybrid of Scottish Gaelic and Irish.

Along with the Rev Prof Daniel Dewar he produced a Gaelic-English/English-Gaelic dictionary in 1831, reprinted 13 times between then and 1910.

Shortly after his death, a collection of his Gaelic prose writings was edited by his son in law, Archibald Clerk, with a biographical sketch by Norman MacLeod jnr., first published as Caraid nan Gaidheal in 1867, reprinted in 1899 and 1910. A second collection was issued in 1901. Other writings include two Gaelic sermons, one on the outbreak of cholera in Glasgow in 1832.

MacLeod used his influence to secure Government aid for the Gaels during the potato famines of 1836-37 and 1847, earning the soubriquet, 'Caraid nan Gàidheal' (Friend of the Gael). A speech delivered in the Egyptian Room of the Mansion House, London, resulted in John Dunmore Lang, a Presbyterian minister in Australia, putting in place opportunities for Gaels to emigrate to Australia.

== Family ==
He married Agnes Maxwell of Aros; they had five sons and six daughters. The two elder sons, Norman Macleod (1812–1872) and Donald became ministers of the Church of Scotland. Their third son, Sir George Husband Baird MacLeod was a surgeon.

MacLeod is sometimes confused with his son, also Rev. Dr. Norman MacLeod, 1812–72, also a Moderator of the General Assembly (in 1869), and author of Morvern, a Highland Parish (first published 1867) and of the song "Farewell to Fiunary".

A statue was erected to Norman Jr. in Cathedral Square, Glasgow, showing him in the court dress of Moderator of the General Assembly of the Church of Scotland, over which he wears the Geneva gown of a Minister of that Church, with the hood of a Doctor of Divinity. He sports the badge of Dean of the Thistle. He is brandishing a Bible and raising his hand in preaching. He can also be seen, this time greeting Queen Victoria, in a relief on her statue in George Square on the occasion of her visit to the Cathedral. The location is significant as it is next to the old Barony Church, of which his son, also Norman was minister from 1851. His greatest renown is for his tireless work on behalf of the huge population of what was then perhaps the poorest slum parish in the city, promoting education and welfare schemes, building schools and mission churches, a penny savings bank, and temperance refreshment rooms.
