= Agnes Maxwell MacLeod =

Scottish poet

Agnes Maxwell Macleod (born c. 1783; died 1879) also known as Mrs. Norman Macleod was a Scottish poet. She is best known as the author of the ballad Sound the Pibroch.

== Life ==
Agnes Maxwell was born on the Isle of Mull, in the Inner Hebrides, the daughter of James Maxwell of Aros, the Duke of Argyll's Chamberlain of Mull and Morvern. In her early youth, she lived with an uncle and aunt in Drumdrissaig, on the western coast of Knapdale.

The Historian Philip Gaskell described the close friendship of Agnes Maxwell with Catherine MacLachlan the eldest daughter of Argyll's tacksman at Rahoy in his book Morvern Transformed. He noted that "Catherine being the eldest girl with many brothers between her and the next sister, was educated six months of the year at home by a governess, and the remaining six other months at Aros, in Mull, with her friend Miss Maxwell (afterwards Mrs Norman Macleod), the governess dividing her time equally between the two households."

When of age, Agnes went to an Edinburgh finishing school, then returned to Mull. She later met the Reverend Norman Macleod, a Church of Scotland minister and married him in 1811.

Agnes’s husband, the Reverend Norman Macleod (1783–1862), was the son of Norman Macleod (1745–1824), the long-serving minister of Morvern, whose home was the manse of Fiunary near Lochaline. According to contemporary memoirs, the Macleod and Maxwell families lived on opposite shores of the Sound of Mull during their youth, and the Fiunary manse was remembered as a large and affectionate household closely connected to the parish.

The importance of Fiunary to the Macleod family is reflected in the poem Farewell to Fiunary by Agnes’s son, Norman Macleod, which was widely sung in both English and Gaelic throughout the Highlands during the nineteenth century.

Agnes’s friend Catherine MacLachlan (1786–1825) married John Sinclair of Lochaline in 1814 and they built Lochaline House next door to the manse of Fiunary. Catherine died in childbirth in 1825.

Agnes spent the next nearly-sixty years as a minister's wife in Campbeltown, Campsie, and at St Columba Church in Glasgow.

Agnes and Norman Macleod had five sons and six daughters. According to the Dictionary of National Biography, the two elder sons, Norman (1812–1872) and Donald, became ministers of the Church of Scotland

== Poetry and legacy ==
Agnes Macleod was the wife of a poet and the mother of poets, and a poet herself. She would go on to write and compile a poetry collection called Songs of the North, that would be edited by her granddaughter Annie Campbell Macleod Wilson, Harold Boulton, and Malcolm Lawson, and which was dedicated to Queen Victoria. One of the songs it contains is Sound the Pibroch, which is about the Jacobite Uprising of 1745, and which has since been recorded by The Corries and many other Scottish folk music bands.
