= Norman Macleod (minister, born 1812) =

Scottish clergyman and author (1812–1872)

The Very Reverend Norman Macleod
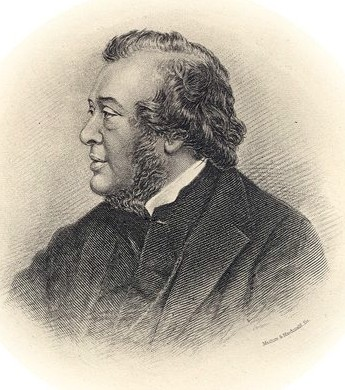
- Born: 3 June 1812; Campbeltown, Scotland
- Died: 16 June 1872 (aged 60); Glasgow, Scotland
- Occupations: Clergyman; author

Norman Macleod (3 June 1812 – 16 June 1872) was a Scottish clergyman and author who served as Moderator of the General Assembly of the Church of Scotland in 1869/70.

== Early life ==
Norman Macleod was born in Kirk Street, Campbeltown, to Norman Macleod and Agnes Maxwell; his paternal grandfather, a minister of the parish of Morvern in Argyllshire, bore the same name.

His father, at that time minister of Campbeltown, was closely bound to the Highlanders of Scotland, catering to their spiritual and intellectual needs. He was the author of literature described by Professor Blackie as the "great work of classical Gaelic prose....written in a dialogue form, enriched by the dramatic grace of Plato and the shrewd humour of Lucian", and played a major role in the creation of an educational infrastructure for the Highlands and Islands. He was a supporter of the interests of the Highlanders.

In 1827, Macleod became a student at the University of Glasgow; in 1831, he went to Edinburgh to study divinity under Thomas Chalmers. On 18 March 1838, he became parish minister at Loudoun, Ayrshire.

== Career ==
At this time the troubles in the Scottish Church were already gathering to a head. Macleod wished the Church to be free to do its proper work, and clung firmly to the idea of a national Established Church, and therefore remained in the Establishment when the Disruption of 1843 took place. He was one of those who took a middle course in the non-intrusion controversy, holding that the fitness of those who were presented to parishes should be judged by the presbyteries, the principle of Lord Aberdeens Bill. On the secession of 1843 he was offered many different parishes, and settled at Dalkeith. He was largely instrumental in the work of strengthening the Church. In 1847 he became one of the founders of the Evangelical Alliance, and from 1849 edited the Christian Instructor. In 1851 he was called to the Barony church, Glasgow, in which city the rest of his days were passed. There the more liberal theology rapidly made way among a people who judged it more by its fruits than its arguments, and MacLeod won many adherents by his practical schemes for the social reform of the people. He instituted temperance refreshment rooms, a Congregational penny savings bank, and held services specially for the poor.

Despite his relatively liberal stance on some issues, he was one of many clergy who preached against Verdi's La Traviata. In a sermon just after its 1857 Scottish premiere, Macleod argued that 'no woman could hear it without a blush'

In 1860 Macleod was appointed editor of the new monthly magazine Good Words, illustrated by Arthur Hughes, Francis Arthur Fraser (1846–1924), John Leighton, James Mahoney (1810–1879), Francis S. Walker, Townley Green and others. Under his control the magazine, which was mainly of a religious character, became widely popular. Most of his own literary work originally appeared in its pages — sermons, stories, travels, poems. His best work was the spontaneous Reminiscences of a Highland Parish (1867). While Good Words made his name known, his relations with the queen and the royal family strengthened yet further his position in the country.

He authored "Eastward, Travels in Egypt, Palestine, and Syria", a record of a journey made in 1864, published in 1866, with photographs by James Graham. An abbreviated reprint by his daughter Ann Campbell Macleod was published in 1887 under the title "Half Hours in the Holy Land, Travels in Egypt, Palestine, Syria, With Numerous Illustrations".

In 1865, Macleod risked an encounter with Scottish Sabbatarian ideas. The presbytery of Glasgow issued a pastoral letter on the subject of Sunday trains and other infringements of the Christian Sabbath. Macleod protested against the grounds on which its strictures were based. For a time, owing partly to a misleading report of his statement, he became the man in all Scotland most profoundly distrusted. But four years later the Church chose him as moderator of her general assembly.

== Late life ==
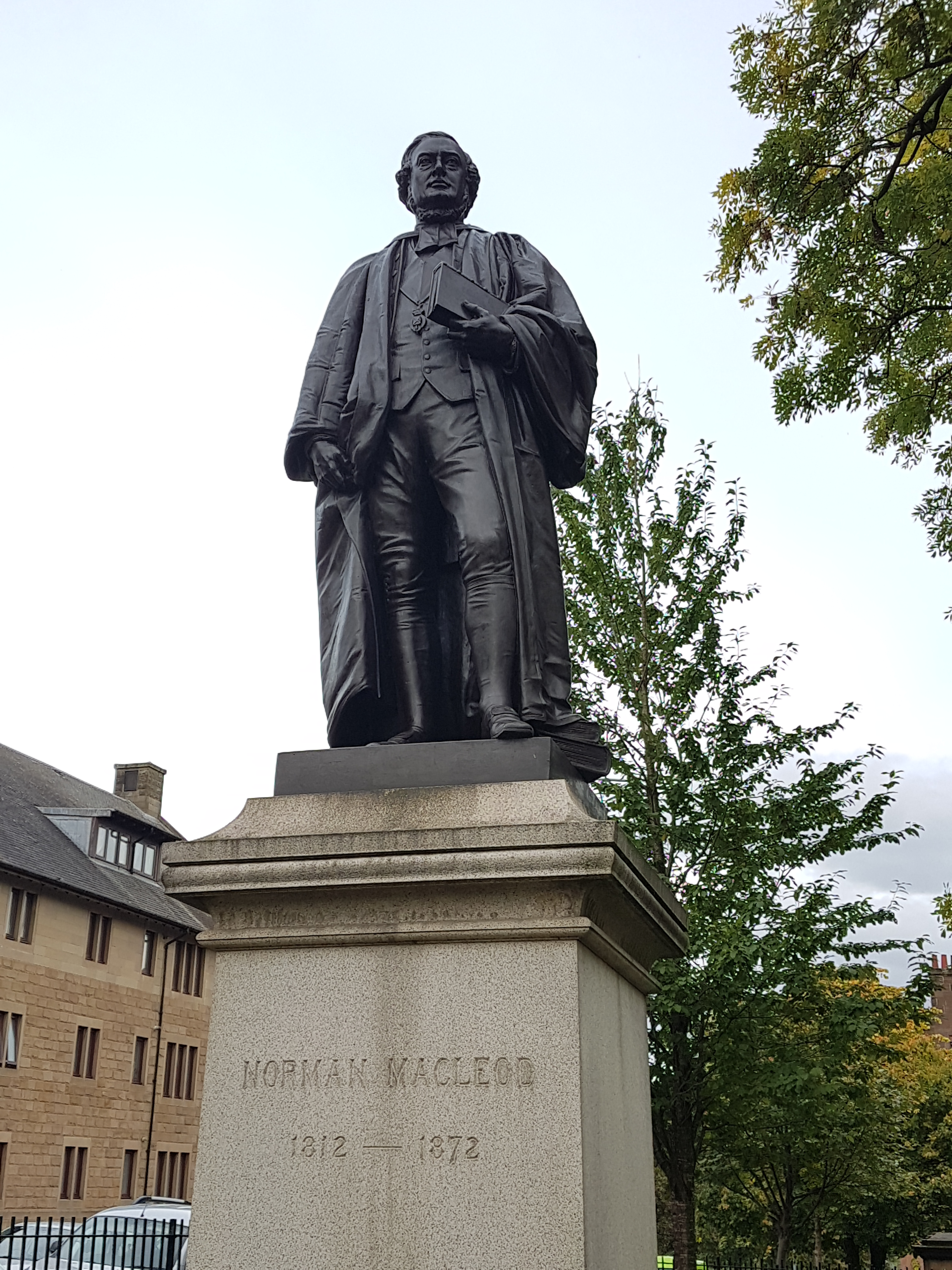
Statue To Reverend Dr Norman Macleod, Cathedral Square, Glasgow

In 1867, along with Archibald Watson, Macleod was sent to India, to inquire into the state of the missions. He undertook the journey in spite of failing health, and seems never to have recovered from its effects. He returned resolved to devote the rest of his days to rousing the Church to her duty in the sphere of foreign missions. He is buried at Campsie. The grave was designed by Glasgow architect William Leiper. The funeral was attended by 3000 people.

His Glasgow church was named after him, the Macleod Parish Church; and the Macleod Missionary Institute was erected by the Barony church in Glasgow. Queen Victoria gave two memorial windows to Crathie church as a testimony of her admiration for his work.

== Artistic recognition ==
Macleod was painted by Tavernor Knott around 1850. The portrait is held by the National Portrait Gallery of Scotland but is rarely displayed.

== Family ==
In August 1851, he married Catherine Ann, daughter of William Mackintosh of Geddes, and sister of John Mackintosh. sister-in-law of Sir William Gordon-Cumming, 2nd Baronet.

・Anne Campbell Macleod (d.1921), married in 1888 Sir James Wilson, and published two books based on her letters to friends and family while they lived in India.

・Katherine Anne (1858-1880) married Hardinge Hay Cameron.

・Sir John MacLeod, 1st Bt (1857–1934) married Edith Fielden, daughter of Joshua Fielden. Their son George MacLeod was to also become Moderator of the Church of Scotland, having founded the Iona Community.

・William MacKintosh MacLeod (1861-1931), married Constance Helen Sellar, daughter of William Young Sellar.
