= George McLeod (footballer, born 1871) =

Australian rules footballer

Personal information
- Full name: George Alfred McLeod
- Born: 13 September 1871; Camperdown, Victoria
- Died: 27 June 1921 (aged 49)
- Original team: Colac
- Debut: Round 7, 1903, St Kilda vs. South Melbourne, at Lake Oval

Playing career^{1}
Years	Club	Games (Goals)
1903	St Kilda	9 (4)
- ^{1} Playing statistics correct to the end of 1903.

George Alfred McLeod (13 September 1871 – 27 June 1921) was an Australian rules footballer who played for St Kilda during the early years of the Victorian Football League (VFL).
