= Monk Soham =

Village in Suffolk, England

Coordinates: 52.239495°N 1.241331°E

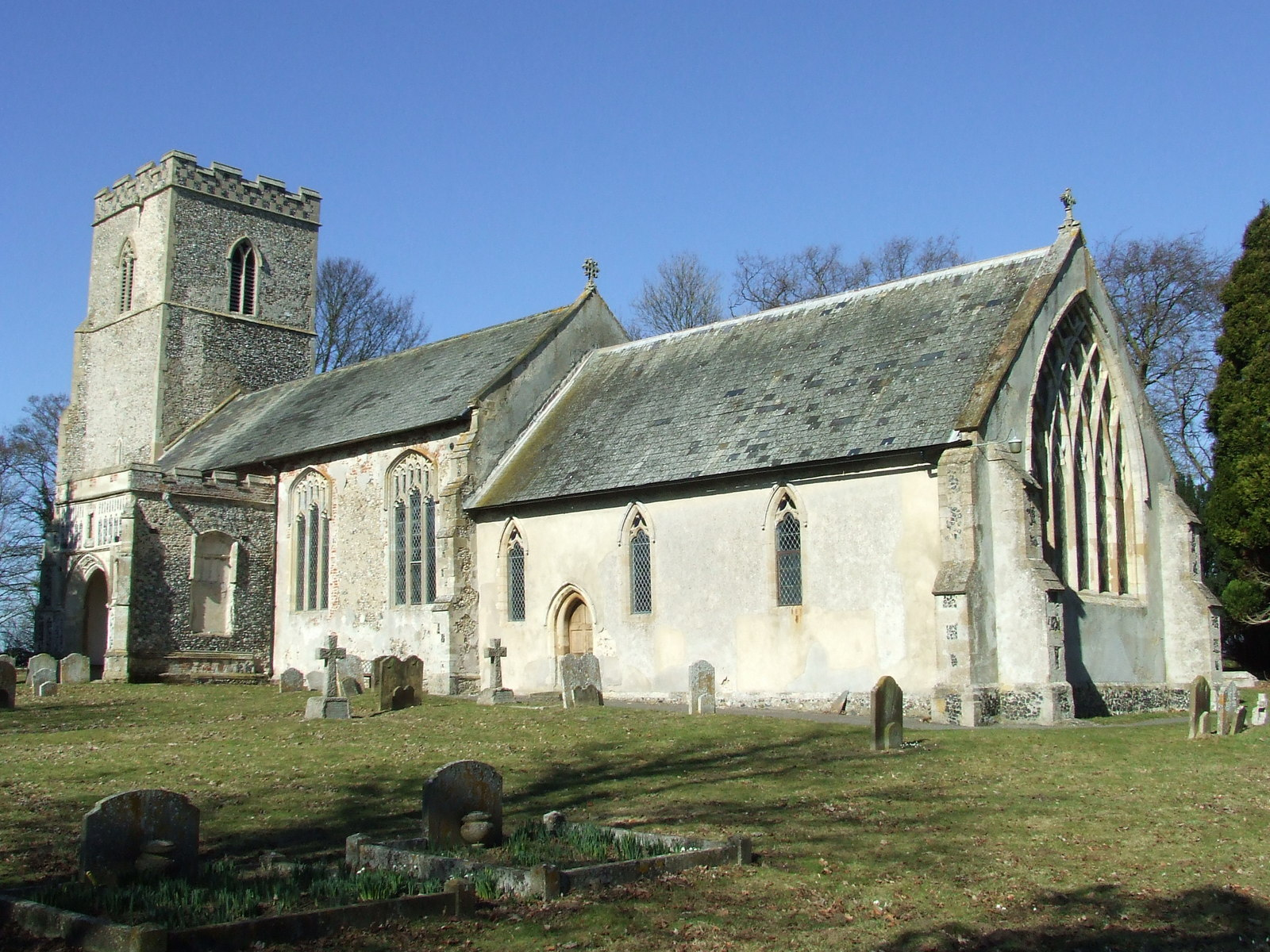
- The parish church of St Peters in Monk Soham

- Location within Suffolk
- Population: 156 (2011)
- OS grid reference: TM214651
- Civil parish: Monk Soham
- District: Mid Suffolk
- Shire county: Suffolk
- Region: East
- Country: England
- Sovereign state: United Kingdom
- Post town: WOODBRIDGE
- Postcode district: IP13
- Dialling code: 01728
- Police: Suffolk
- Fire: Suffolk
- Ambulance: East of England

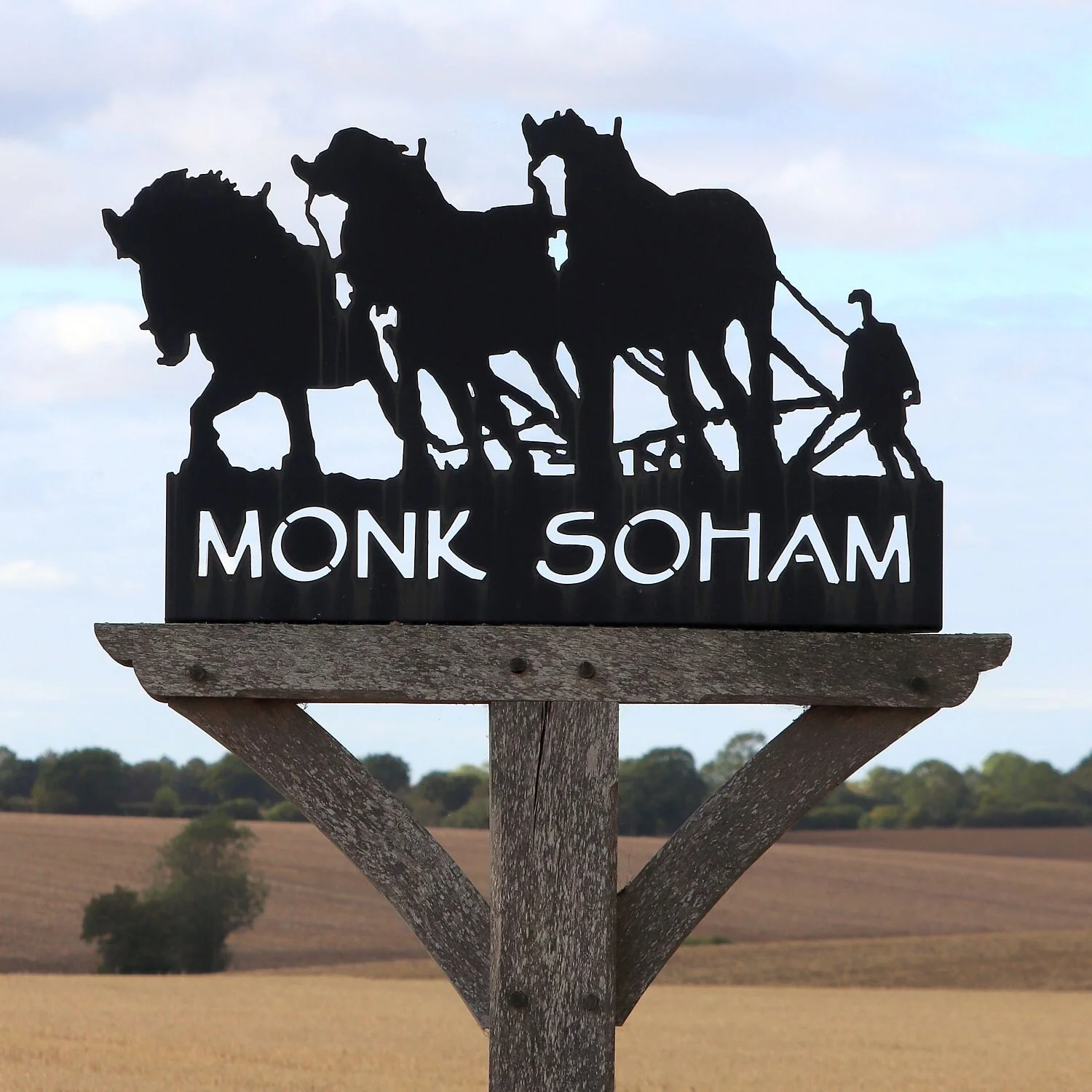
Monk Soham Village Sign

Monk Soham is a village in Suffolk, eastern England, four miles (6.4 km) northeast of Debenham and six miles (10 km) northwest of Framlingham. The neighbouring villages are Bedfield, Ashfield cum Thorpe, Kenton and Bedingfield. The nearest primary school is in Bedfield. There are secondary schools in Framlingham, Debenham and Woodbridge.

In 2011, Monk Soham had a population of 156.

In the early 1870s, Monk Soham was described as a parish, with a village, in Hoxne district, Suffolk; four and a quarter miles WNW of Framlingham r. station. Post town, Wickham-Market. Acres, 1,569. Real property, £3,153. Pop., 442. Houses, 86. The property is subdivided. The living is a rectory in the diocese of Norwich. Value, £530. There are a parochial school, and charities £80.

== History ==
Monk Soham directly means "monks" meadow by a "lake". The monks belonged to the abbey at Bury, and were given the land in the late 10th century by Alfed, Bishop of East Anglia. The lake no longer exists, however, it is believed to have reclined north of the back road which now runs from Earl Soham towards Ashfield-cum-Thorpe.

In Domesday Book, "Soham" was described as a village which consisted of both Monk and Earl Soham. Monk Soham was considered to be in the Bishop's Hundred along with Hoxne, while Earl Soham was considered to be in a different hundred for judicial purposes. This suggests that both villages have since been separated, as on twenty-first century maps they have distinguished boundaries. Domesday Book also states Monk Soham had fifteen acres of meadow and woodland for thirty pigs and eighty-one goats in the 11th century; this suggests that the rural town was focused on farming and agriculture and carried on this sector of work for many centuries, and in 1868 the parish was recorded as "wholly agricultural". Most of the woods were cut down between 1500 and 1640 to make room for pasture. County records describe the village as consisting mainly of meadow with the farming of dairy cows, pigs, horses and poultry as well as growing a variety of crops. Following the 13th century reorganization of the hundreds, Monk Soham was in Hoxne Hundred.

Monk Soham was described as having a small market on a Saturday and a charity school in 1813. In the mid-1800s, a village school was built for 85 pupils. Attendance averaged 82 by 1883, however, it fell to 42 in 1900 and after gradual decline, in 1947 the school was closed. In 1958 the Suffolk Parish History described Monk Soham as "a small dispersed settlement".

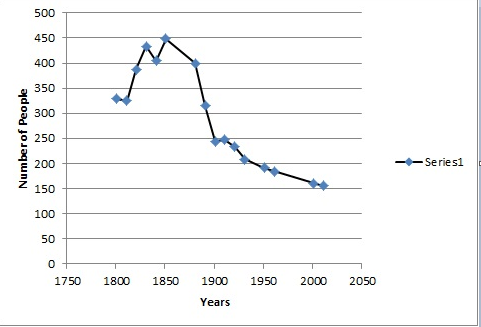
This graph shows the population change for Monk Soham, Suffolk, as reported by the Census of the population from 1801 to 2011.

Abbey House is a listed historical Victorian Rectory, set in an idyllic setting surrounded by ten acres of private garden and meadowland. The house lies hidden amongst the many magnificent old oak, beech and lime trees in the grounds.

Claude Morley, the English antiquary and entomologist who specialised in Hymenoptera and Diptera, lived in Monk Soham House from 1904 until his death in 1951. It is clear that the monks used to take part in the recreational sport of fishing as the fishponds they used can still be identified today although most have dried up.

== Demographics ==
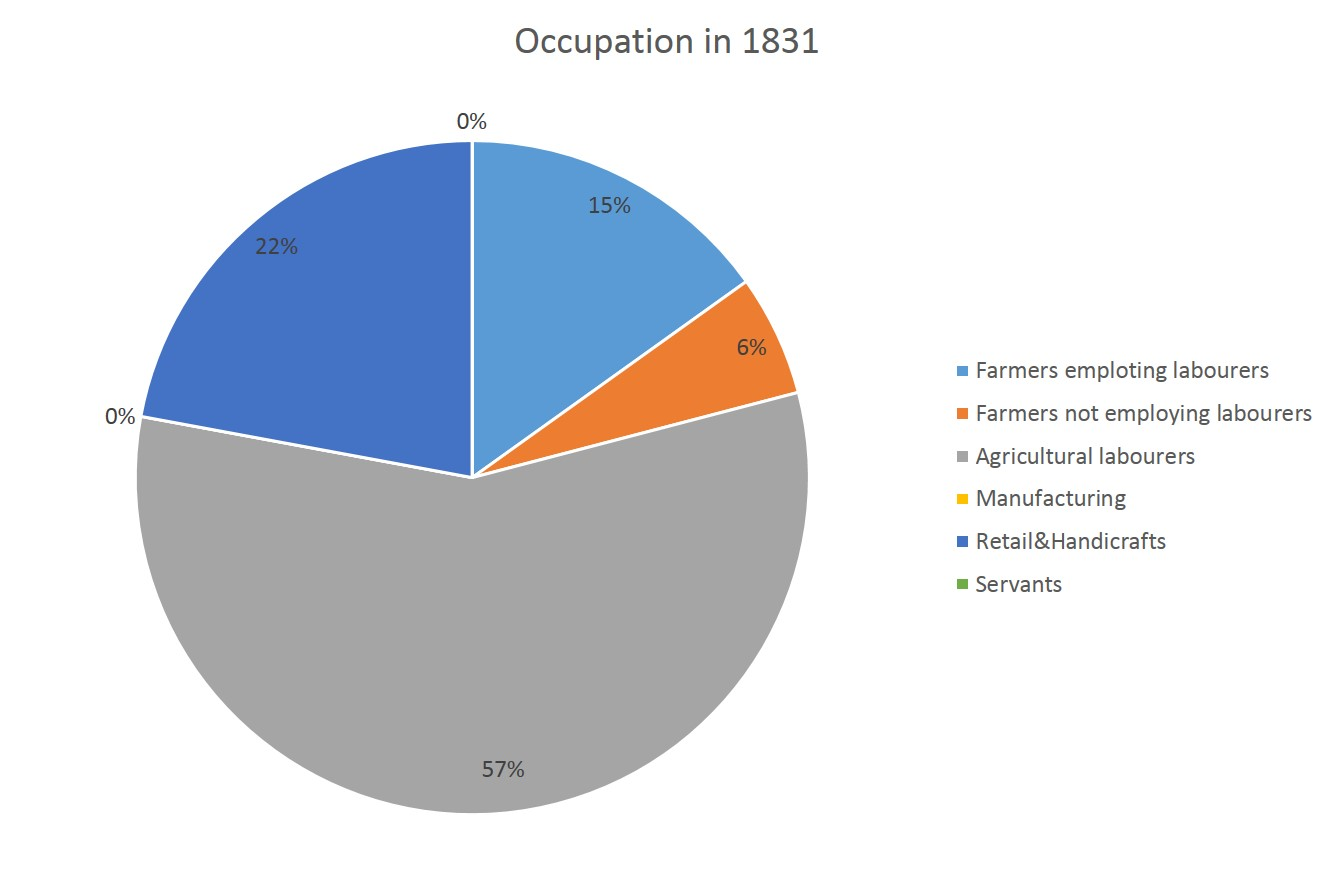
Occupation for inhabitants in Monk Soham according to 1831 census data

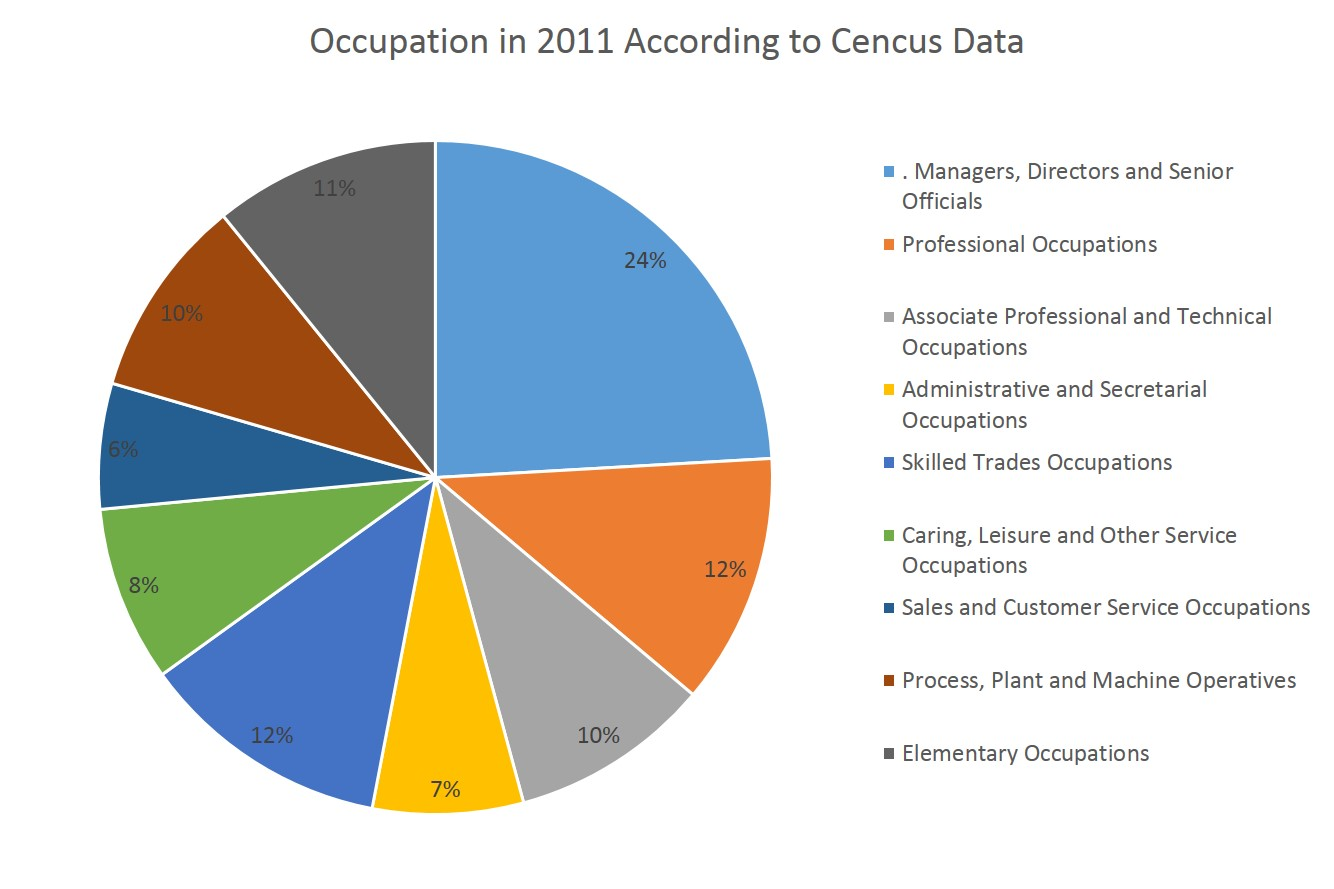
Occupation for inhabitants in Monk Soham according to 2011 census data

Census data for Monk Soham dates back to 1801. The earliest recorded population total at this time was 329. The highest number to be recorded by the census was in 1851 with a total population of 448. The population of this parish has been in decline since 1851, with the lowest recorded being in 2011 with a total population of 156, which is under half of the highest recorded figure.

The main industry recorded for the village in 1831 was in agriculture, in particular, 57% of inhabitants were agricultural labourers. In the 2011 Census this figure had dropped to 0% and the most popular occupations with 24% of the people are the managers, directors and senior officials' jobs. The explanation for this is due to Britain's shift from primary sector jobs to secondary and finally tertiary. This will also explain why most of the other jobs are in the tertiary sector such as customer service occupations and caring, leisure and other service occupations. This century, many inhabitants commute to London, Ipswich, Norwich and Cambridge leaving few to work on the land.

== St Peter's Church ==
A church has been recorded in Monk Soham since 1086, however, the earliest parts of the present building date from 1300.

St Peter's Church has a notable Seven Sacrament font, which is one of thirteen in Suffolk and one of forty in the UK, which is finely detailed. The panel facing east is for the Mass, and then; Baptism (NE), Ordination (N), Confirmation (NW), Last Rites (W), Matrimony (SW), Crucifixion (S) and Confession (SE). There is also a square embattled tower. Archdeacon Robert Groome was the rector of Monk Soham for forty-four years from 1845, and spent £850 in 1860 on restoring St Peter's after the structure was in such bad condition. His friend and poet Edward Fitzgerald gave him four yew trees which were planted by the church gates. To remember the 2000 millennium, in the churchyard a further two more yew trees were planted in union with the Parish Council.

== Transport ==
In 1904 the Mid-Suffolk Light Railway opened stations two miles away (3 km) at Kenton and Worlingworth, for goods traffic, and extended the service to passengers in 1908, which gave the villagers of Monk Soham a chance to travel. From then on, it was possible to catch a train to Haughley Junction and there onward to Ipswich and London. The line was never extended and was closed in July 1952.

High Suffolk Community Transport is the bus operator services that provides several different routes through the small villages, however many of the routes are very irregular, and many of them only run one day a week or come every few hours. The nearest train station to Monk Soham is Wickham Market, which is 9.11 miles (14.66 km) away. An hourly bus service runs from Framlingham to Ipswich with every other one passing through Earl Soham.

== Hungers Green ==
Hungers Green is an area of Common Land in the Parish of Monk Soham. It runs from south to north from School Lane in Monk Soham to the boundary, with Bedfield Parish in the north. Its area is just under 2 hectares. Due to Hungers Green being Common Land, it is distinguished as "Access Land" under the Countryside and Rights of Way Act (CRoW), passed in 2000. Details of access under the "Right to Roam" legislation are found on the Ramblers and Government Association websites.

Adjacent to the Green is privately owned woods which is locally known as Flooks Wood, and contains a small pond. It is an example of the greens and commons that are very typical of the claylands of High Suffolk, however, many of these have become lost or fragmented to intensive agriculture or urban-style development. The greens and commons remaining are consequently significant historical landscape features and vital for wildlife, meaning Hungers Green is a popular site to visit when in the area.

The grassland and adjacent woodland has high wildlife value from barn owls, to butterfly to grass snakes and swallows. Historically, the grass would have been used for hay and/or grazing of animals. Grazing rights for cows were given to two locals on Hungers Green but these have not been exercised for a number of years. Recently, a period of overgrazing has resulted in creeping thistle becoming problematic. Suffolk Wildlife offered advice on the long term care of the Green for wildlife in 2004. Subsequently, to ensure the welfare of Hungers Green, an environmental group has been established.
