= Francis Hindes Groome =

English writer on the Romani people

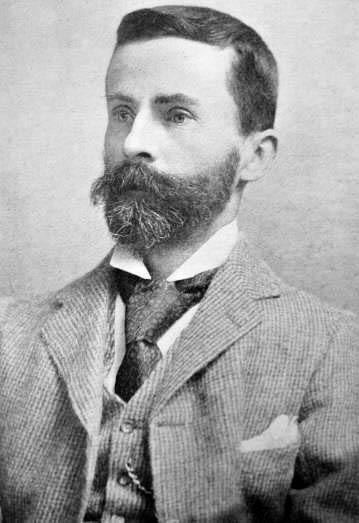
- Born: 30 August 1851; Monk Soham, Suffolk, England
- Died: 24 January 1902 (aged 50); London, England
- Resting place: Monk Soham, Suffolk
- Relatives: Robert Hindes Groome (father)
- Writing career
- Pen name: The Tarno Rye

Francis Hindes Groome (30 August 1851 – 24 January 1902), nicknamed the “Tarno Rye”, was a writer and foremost commentator of his time on the Romani people, their language, life, history, customs, beliefs, and lore.

He was the son of Robert Hindes Groome, Archdeacon of Suffolk.

== Life ==
Groome was born at his father's rectory in Monk Soham, Suffolk, on 30 August 1851. He was educated at Ipswich School, where his lifelong interest in Romanies was sparked, and continued at Oxford University. He left Oxford without taking a degree, spent some time at the University of Göttingen, in Germany, and then for six years lived with Romani at home and abroad. He married a woman of Romani blood, Esmeralda Locke, in 1876 and settled down to regular literary work in Edinburgh.

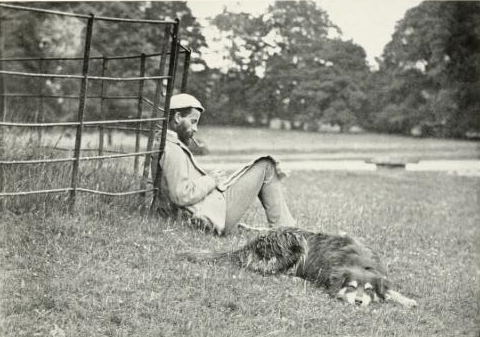
Groome and his dog in the late 19th century

Groome contributed generously and on a variety of subjects to such publications as the Encyclopædia Britannica, the Dictionary of National Biography, Blackwood's Magazine, the Athenaeum, Johnson's Universal Cyclopedia, The Bookman, Chambers' Biographical Dictionary, the Ordnance Gazetteer of Scotland (in six volumes), and as joint editor, with his father and poet Edward Fitzgerald, of "Suffolk Notes and Queries" for the Ipswich Journal.

His article on 'Gipsies', in the ninth edition of the Encyclopædia Britannica, made him known to the world as a "gypsyologist". In 1899 he published his most significant book for folklorists, Gypsy Folk-Tales. These well-annotated collections are a significant addition to the comparative study of the world's folktales. He also co-edited the first three volumes of Gypsy Lore Society's Journal, and wrote nineteen brief articles and collections of folktales for it.

He wrote a number of books including a novel of Romani life, an English–Scottish border history, a sketch of his father and Fitzgerald, and an autobiographical account of his time living with the Romani.

Groome was a sub-editor of Chambers's Encyclopaedia; joint-editor of the 1897 edition of Chamber's Dictionary of Biography.

== Death ==
Groome died on 24 January 1902, aged 50, in London. He was buried at Monk Soham, Suffolk.

== Legacy ==
In October 1901, Groome's library of books, letters, and manuscripts bearing upon the study of the Romani was purchased by the Boston Athenæum. The collection comprises over one hundred volumes, some which are rare, and others contain rare tracts and magazine articles. There are also Groome's own books with his marginal additions, over thirty volumes of manuscript notes, lectures, and his correspondence with M. Paul Bataillard, the eminent French student of the Romani, covering the years 1872 to 1880.

== Works ==
Books and articles written on the Romani People:

- The Gipsies: Reminiscences and Social Life of this Extraordinary Race (1881) Google Books
- In Gipsy Tents (1881) Google Books
- Gipsy folk-tales : A Missing Link (1888) Athenaeum catalog
- The Influence of the Gypsies on the Superstitions of the English folk. (1892) Boston Athenaeum catalog
- Tobit and Jack the Giant-Killer (1898) Boston Athenaeum catalog
- Gypsy Folk-tales (1899) Internet Archive
- Antonio de Solario (undated) Boston Athenaeum catalog

Other non-fiction:

- The Only Darter: a Suffolk clergyman's reminiscence Boston Athenaeum catalog
- Two Suffolk Friends (1895) Google Books
- Edward FitzGerald: an Aftermath (1902) Google Books
- A Short Border History 1887 Google Books

Fiction:

- Kriegspiel: The War Game (1896) Internet Archive

Editor:

- Ordnance Gazetteer of Scotland: a Survey of Scottish Topography, Statistical, Biographical, and Historical
- Lavengro (1901 edition)
- Gypsy Lore Society Journal, Volume 1–3
- Chamber's Biographical Dictionary (1897 edition)
