= Whitchurch Rural District, Shropshire =

Former local government area in the UK

Coordinates: 52.941°N 2.648°W

Whitchurch was a rural district in Shropshire, England, from 1894 to 1934.

It was formed under the Local Government Act 1894 based on part of the Whitchurch rural sanitary district. It included the parishes of Ightfield and Whitchurch Rural.

The district was abolished in 1934 under a County Review Order. Ightfield went to Drayton Rural District, with Whitchurch Rural being split between the Whitchurch urban district, Wem Rural District and Drayton RD.
