= Lucy Appleby =

English cheesemaker (1920–2008)

- Born: Florence Lucy Walley; 1 February 1920; Lighteach Farm, Whitchurch, Shropshire, England
- Died: 24 April 2008 (aged 88)
- Occupation: Cheesemaker
- Spouse: Lancelot Appleby (m. 1940 – 2003; his death)
- Children: 7

Florence Lucy Appleby MBE (née Walley; 1 February 1920 – 24 April 2008) was an English traditional cheesemaker. She created 'Mrs Appleby's Cheshire' which, by the time of her death, was the last remaining Cheshire cheese to observe the traditions of using unpasteurised milk from the farm herd, being bound in calico cloth and matured on-farm. Appleby co-founded the Specialist Cheesemakers Association to defend the use of unpasteurised milk in cheesemaking.

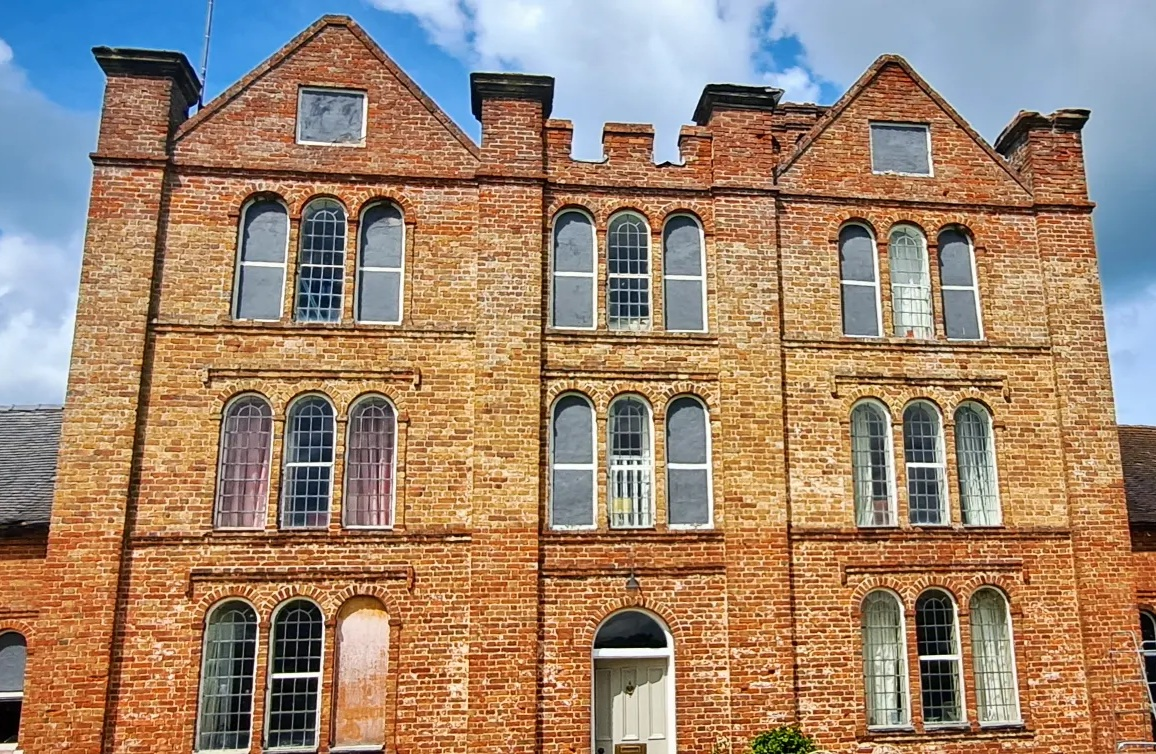
Hawkstone Abbey Farm, her residence

== Early life and education ==
One of eight children, Lucy Appleby was born Florence Lucy Walley on 1 February 1920 to a farming and cheesemaking family at Lighteach Farm, Whitchurch, Shropshire. She attended Whitchurch Girls School which was integrated into Sir John Talbot’s School in 1936.

She learnt cheesemaking from her grandmother and mother and went on to study it at Cheshire School of Agriculture (now Reaseheath College) under the direction of a Miss Bennion, Chief Dairy Instructress and proponent of traditional cheesemaking techniques.

== Cheesemaking ==
The Applebys' cheese company was founded in 1952. The stables at Hawkstone Abbey Farm were converted into a dairy where Appleby made cloth-bound Cheshire cheese to a traditional recipe using unpasteurised milk from their herd of Friesian cattle.

Appleby's ambition was to revive a cheese that had been made on 2000 farms as recently as 1914 but whose production had declined to less than 50 producers by the time Lucy started the Appleby's cheese company. In 2017, the Appleby family was the only remaining regular producer of unpasteurised milk farmhouse Cheshire.

Lucy Appleby took a number of decisions as a cheesemaker that went against the emerging trends and pressures of her time but which preserved the authenticity and quality of Appleby's Cheshire.

At the time that Appleby began making cheese at Hawkstone Abbey Farm cheesemakers were experimenting with binding cheeses in wax, rather than the traditional calico cloth to reduce moisture loss and thus increase yield. Appleby rejected this method because she believed that calico allowed the cheese to breathe and better flavours to develop as a result. In later years she encouraged fellow cheesemakers who had adopted wax binding to revert to calico.

As was customary at the time, the Appleby's cheese was initially sold through the Milk Marketing Board (MMB). But over time the MMB became less aligned with the Applebys' relatively small scale, artisan approach and in 1982 they broke ties with the organisation. This meant their cheese could be marketed for the first time under the family name. As a result, the Applebys needed to find new markets for their cheese and so they drove, with a typical 20kg wheel of cheese, to London to introduce leading artisan cheese sellers to Mrs Appleby's Cheshire. This direct approach was a success and within five years the Appleby's were selling 1.5 tonnes a week.

In the late 1980s a series of public health scares led supermarkets to stop selling cheese made from unpasteurised milk. Whilst many cheesemakers felt compelled to pasteurise their milk in order to retain the supermarkets' business, Appleby did not follow suit believing that quality unpasteurised milk was key to the flavour and texture of her cheese. Appleby subsequently co-founded, with Randolph Hodgson, the Specialist Cheesemakers Association, to lobby for the preservation of cheeses made with unpasteurised milk and to encourage excellence in farmhouse cheesemaking.

== Personal life ==
After leaving college she met farmer Lancelot Appleby, whom she married 16 October 1940. She made the Lighteach cheese on her wedding day. They lived for two years near the village of Malpas, Cheshire, before moving to Lance's family farm, Hawkstone Abbey Farm, situated on the edge of the Cheshire Plain in North Shropshire. Over the following decade Lucy and Lance had seven children. After raising her children she returned to cheese-making using her own recipe.

Lance Appleby died in 2003 and Lucy Appleby died on 24 April 2008.

== Awards ==
In 2001 Lucy and Lance Appleby were both awarded MBEs for their services to cheesemaking in Shropshire.

== See also ==
- List of cheesemakers
