= Broughall =

Village in Shropshire, England

Coordinates: 52.968°N 2.644°W

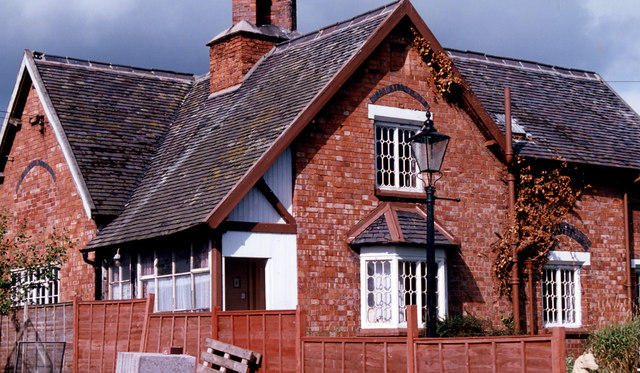
- Former village school building, Broughall

- Location within Shropshire
- Population: 7,000
- OS grid reference: SJ567414
- Civil parish: Whitchurch Urban; Whitchurch Rural
- Unitary authority: Shropshire
- Ceremonial county: Shropshire
- Region: West Midlands
- Country: England
- Sovereign state: United Kingdom
- Post town: WHITCHURCH
- Postcode district: SY13
- Dialling code: 01948
- Police: West Mercia
- Fire: Shropshire
- Ambulance: West Midlands
- UK Parliament: North Shropshire

Broughall is a village in Shropshire, England, situated about 1.5 miles east of Whitchurch, also the site of the nearest railway station. The village is arranged largely along the A525 road, and is surrounded by green fields.
