= Whitchurch Waterway Trust =

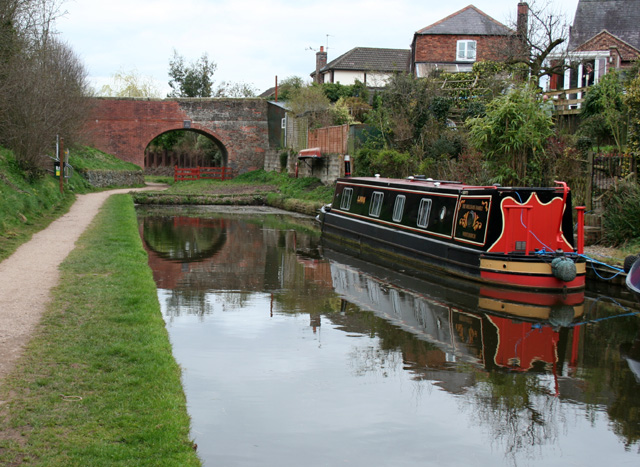
Whitchurch Arm, showing canal end at Chemistry Bridge photo: Espresso Adict, geograph.org.uk

Whitchurch Waterway Trust is a registered charity number 701050 that exists to promote the management and restoration of the Whitchurch Arm of the Llangollen Canal. It was formed in 1988, in response to plans by Whitchurch Town Council to bring the canal back into the town, as a way of promoting tourism.

== History of the arm ==
The Whitchurch Arm was first authorised by an act of Parliament in 1796, which also allowed the Ellesmere Canal Company to alter the route of its main line. The main line joined the Chester Canal at Hurleston Junction, and was opened throughout by 1805. The canal company decided to abandon the planned arm to Whitchurch in 1800, but in 1805 was approached by a group of businessmen who wanted to build both the branch and a short extension to Castle Well, so that the terminus was nearer to the centre of the town.

Ellesmere Canal (Whitchurch Extension) Act 1810
- Act of Parliament
- Parliament of the United Kingdom
- Long title: An Act to enable the Company of Proprietors of the Ellesmere Canal to extend the Whitchurch Line of the said Canal from Sherryman's Bridge to Castle Well, in the Town of Whitchurch, in the County of Salop; and for amending the several Acts for making the said Canal.
- Citation: 50 Geo. 3. c. xxiv

Dates
- Royal assent: 6 April 1810

Other legislation
- Repealed by: Ellesmere and Chester Canal Act 1827

Status: Repealed

Text of statute as originally enacted

The canal company decided that it did not have the powers to delegate construction of the arm to the consortium, and so completed the construction of the original route using money borrowed from the businessmen. It was opened on 6 July 1808. The act of Parliament needed to authorise the extension was not applied for until 1809. It was passed as the Ellesmere Canal (Whitchurch Extension) Act 1810 (50 Geo. 3. c. xxiv) and the extra quarter mile (0.4 km) of canal was opened in 1811, featuring a narrow triangular basin at its terminus, rather than the rectangular one shown on the plans.

By 1939 all traffic on the Llangollen Arm of the Shropshire Union Canal from Hurleston to Llangollen had ceased, and both the Llangollen Arm and the Whitchurch Arm were formally closed to navigation under the London Midland and Scottish Railway (Canals) Act 1944 (8 & 9 Geo. 6. c. ii). The Whitchurch branch was not reopened when the adjacent section of canal, now re-branded as the Llangollen Canal, was reopened in the 1950s.

=== Incidents ===
In December 2025, the canal was drained following a failure of the bank, leaving several boats stranded.

== Formation of the trust ==
In the early 1980s, Whitchurch Town Council began to consider options for bringing the canal back into the town, as a way of promoting tourism. In 1983, they funded a feasibility study to look at the costs, benefits and potential problems of restoring the infilled arm, which was carried out by Liverpool Polytechnic and the Civil Engineering Department of Aston University. After a public meeting was held to gauge support for the proposals, the district council protected the route for the canal in its local plan.

A group of enthusiasts formed the Whitchurch Arm Trust in mid-1986. The group had the backing of the town council, and had the reopening of the arm as its primary aim. As the goals became clearer, the council suggested the formation of a charitable trust, to be called the Whitchurch Waterway Trust, and this was incorporated on 26 July 1988. The trust would initially be responsible for the reopening of 0.75 miles (1.21 km) of the branch. Beyond that, much of the route had been redeveloped in the 1950s, and a new route would be required to reach the town centre.

The trust managed to secure grants to fund the restoration of the first section of the arm from its junction with the Llangollen Canal to the bridge at Chemistry, and this was completed in October 1993, providing overnight and long stay moorings. The trust is responsible for the management of the arm. The trust is registered charity number 701050.

The trust then turned their attention to raising funds to buy the land needed to restore the canal to the town centre. In 1997, the hopes of many working within the canal restoration movement were raised by the announcement that the Millennium Commission would be making significant grants to enable projects to be completed. The trust made applications to both the Millennium Commission and to the Rural Challenge Fund, but both were rejected, and so phase two of the project was postponed.

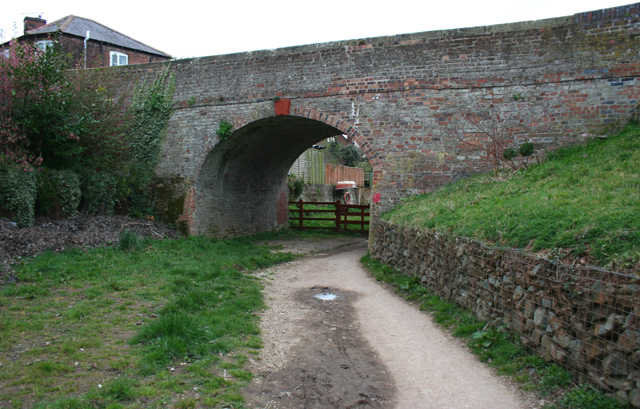
View from the other side of Chemistry Bridge, where the extension is proposed

=== Potential future developments ===
In February 2012, Whitchurch Waterway Trust unveiled plans to extend the canal under Chemistry Bridge and create a new basin with moorings on part of the country park, which would enable canal boats to moor closer to the town of Whitchurch. The estimated cost of the extension and new basin was revised in January 2014 to £650,000 which includes a generous contingency to allow for possible discovery of contamination of soil in the excavation – although a number of sample bore-holes did not realise such fears.

== See also ==
- Whitchurch Waterway Trust's website
- Whitchurch Waterways Country Park
- List of waterway societies in the United Kingdom
- List of navigation authorities in the United Kingdom

== Bibliography ==
- Brown, Peter (2003). "The Canal comes to Whitchurch". Whitchurch Waterway Trust.
- Squires, Roger (2008). Britain's restored canals. Landmark Publishing. ISBN 978-1-84306-331-5.
