= Jack Wright (rugby union, born 1910) =

England international rugby union player

- Full name: John Cecil Wright
- Born: 6 August 1910 Whitchurch, England
- Died: August 2003 Lincolnshire, England

Rugby union career
- Position: Forward
International career
| Years | Team | Apps | (Points) |
| 1934 | England | 1 | (0) |

John Cecil Wright (6 August 1910 – August 2003) was an English international rugby union player.

Born in Whitchurch, Shropshire, Wright was educated at a Shrewsbury preparatory school and Sedbergh School.

Wright served in the Metropolitan Police from 1929 to 1935 and was based at a station in central London. He captained the Metropolitan Police rugby side, while making appearances with Crewe and Nantwich when on leave. In 1934, Wright was capped for England in a Home Nations match against Wales in Cardiff. He also played football as a goalkeeper with Shrewsbury Town in the Midland Football League.

During World War II, Wright served as a King's Shropshire Light Infantry officer and participated in the Tunisian campaign, for which he was mentioned in dispatches in 1943. He was later a prisoner of war in Italy and Germany.

Wright was a farmer in Lincolnshire and Wales in his post war years.

== See also ==
- List of England national rugby union players
