= Whitchurch Waterways Country Park =

Country park in Shropshire, England

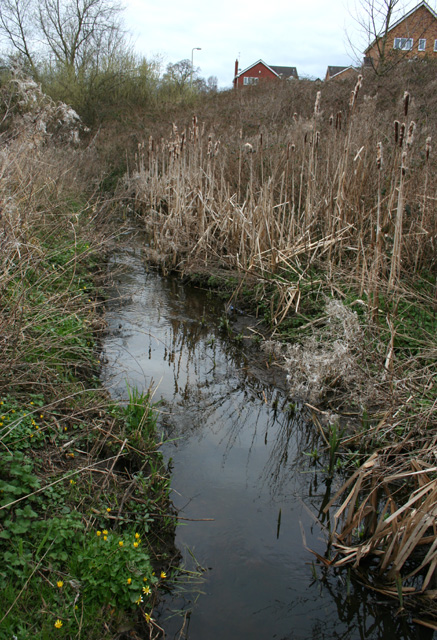
Staggs Brook, which forms part of the park, is an important habitat for water voles photo

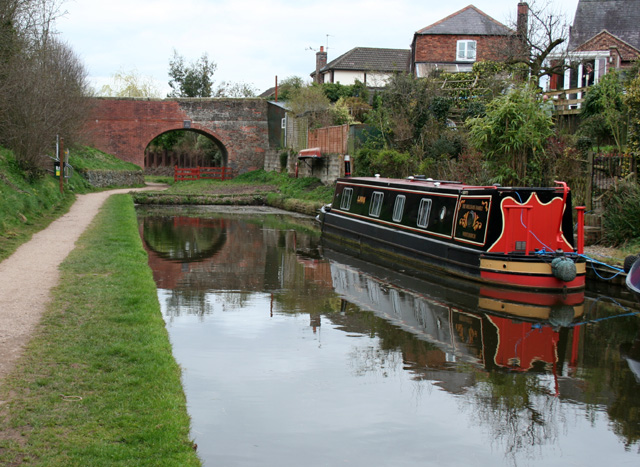
Whitchurch Waterways Country Park showing canal end at Chemistry Bridge photo

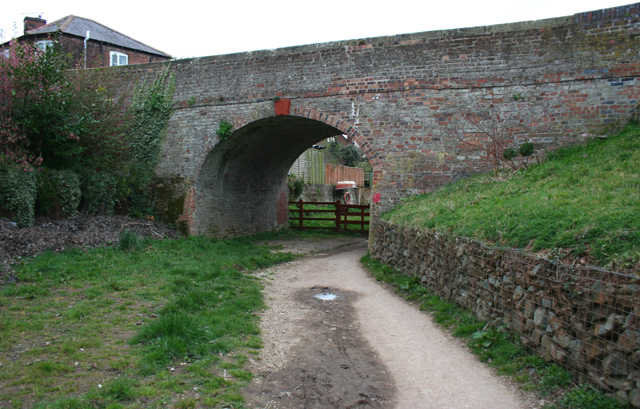
View from the other side of Chemistry Bridge, where it is planned to extend the canal photo

Whitchurch Waterways Country park is an open space to the west of the Shropshire town of Whitchurch. Opened in its current form in 2002, it is a recreation area and Green corridor that takes in a town park, Greenfields Nature Reserve, Staggs Brook and the Whitchurch Arm of the Llangollen Canal. The area is maintained by Whitchurch Town Council and owned by Whitchurch Waterway Trust. There are plans to extend the canal within the country park and create a basin for Narrowboat moorings.

== History and location ==
The country park was created as part of Whitchurch Renewal Area Scheme and developed from a project initiated in the 1980s by North Shropshire District Council and the town council to bring a defunct canal back into Whitchurch as a tourist attraction. Originally a branch of the Llangollen Canal, the canal had opened in 1811 and was formally closed in 1944. Early work to secure the future of the site included the purchase of land in the Sherrymill Hill area of the town to preserve it from future development and the creation of the Whitchurch Waterway Trust to lead the project. The country park formally opened in 2002. It is located to the west of Whitchurch, close to the A41. The area includes Greeenfields Nature Reserve – managed by Shropshire Wildlife Trust – Staggs Brook, the town's Jubilee Park and the Whitchurch Arm of the canal.

=== Wildlife and natural features ===
The presence of water and unimproved grassland and patches of semi-natural woodland, particularly around Greenfields Nature Reserve, has created a habitat that includes Cuckoo flower and water voles, as well as many butterfly species. The area around Staggs Brook is now managed to maintain it as a suitable habitat for the water voles, which are a protected species in the UK.

=== Potential future developments ===
In February 2012, Whitchurch Waterway Trust unveiled plans to extend the canal under Chemistry Bridge and create a new basin with moorings on part of the country park. The proposed scheme would cost an estimated £475,000 and enable canal boats to moor closer to the centre of Whitchurch. The proposal is still being assessed for flood risk and impact on biodiversity after queries were raised by both the Environment Agency and the Canal and River Trust.

== See also ==
- Whitchurch Waterway Trust
- Llangollen Canal
