= Whitchurch Rural =

Civil parish in Shropshire, England

Coordinates: 52.941°N 2.648°W

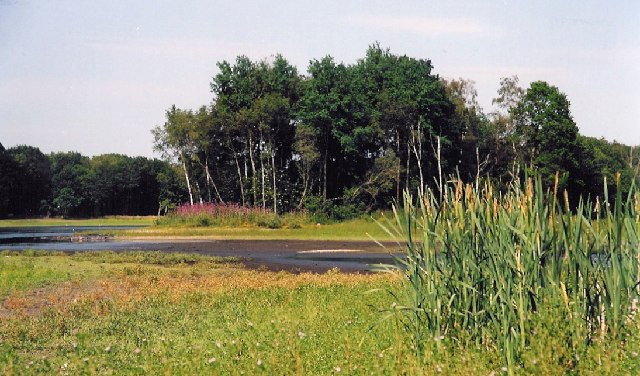
- Brown Moss Nature Reserve

- Location within Shropshire
- Population: 1,611 (2021 census)
- Civil parish: Whitchurch Rural
- Unitary authority: Shropshire
- Ceremonial county: Shropshire
- Region: West Midlands
- Country: England
- Sovereign state: United Kingdom
- Police: West Mercia
- Fire: Shropshire
- Ambulance: West Midlands

Whitchurch Rural is a civil parish in Shropshire, England. It covers the area south and south-east of the town of Whitchurch, including the villages of Ash, Prees Heath, Tilstock and Broughall. In 2021 the parish had a population of 1611.

== History ==
The area was historically part of the parish of Whitchurch. In 1860, a local government district called Whitchurch and Dodington was created, covering comprising the two townships of Whitchurch and Dodington, which together formed the built-up area of the town. The rural parts of Whitchurch parish were not included in the local government district. Under the Local Government Act 1894, such districts were reconstituted as urban districts. The 1894 Act also directed that civil parishes could no longer straddle district boundaries, and so the parish of Whitchurch was split into a Whitchurch Urban parish matching the urban district and a Whitchurch Rural parish outside the urban district.

At the district level, Whitchurch Rural parish formed part of the wider Whitchurch Rural District from 1894 to 1934, when it became part of the Wem Rural District. It then became part of North Shropshire Rural District in 1967, which was replaced by the larger North Shropshire district in 1974. In 2009 that district was abolished. Shropshire County Council then took over district-level functions, making it a unitary authority, and was renamed Shropshire Council.

== Governance ==
There are two tiers of local government covering Whitchurch Rural, at parish (town) and unitary authority level: Whitchurch Rural Parish Council and Shropshire Council. The parish council meets alternately at the village halls in Ash Magna and Tilstock.
