= Whitchurch Civic Centre =

Municipal building in Whitchurch, Shropshire, England

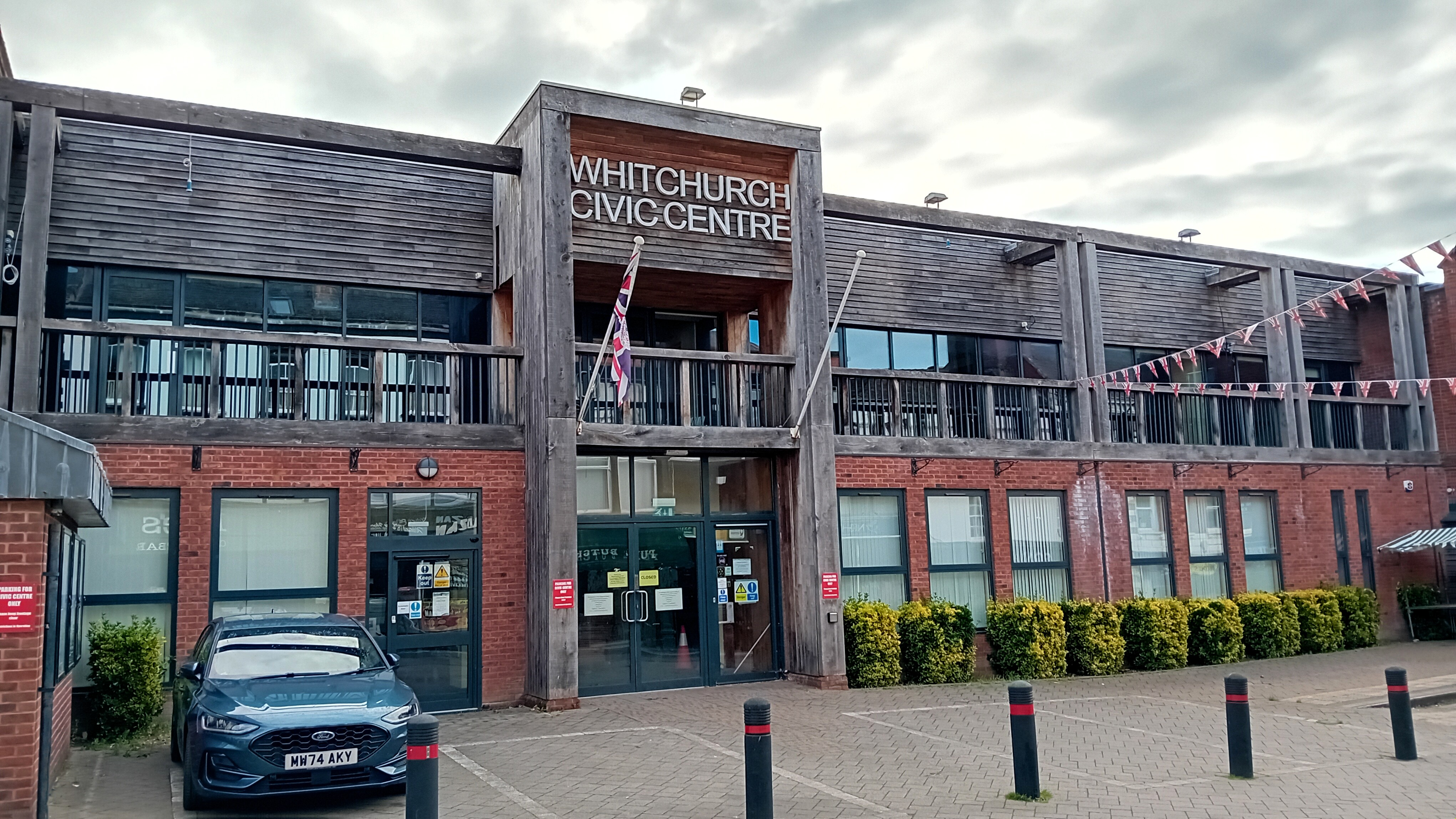
- The building in 2025

- Shown in Shropshire
- 52.9699°N 2.6841°W
- Location: High Street, Whitchurch

History
- Built: 1970

Site notes
- Architectural style: Modern style

Whitchurch Civic Centre is a municipal building in Whitchurch, a town in Shropshire, in England. It accommodated the offices of Whitchurch Town Council until September 2023, when the building was closed, following the discovery of potentially dangerous reinforced autoclaved aerated concrete.

== History ==
=== The 1718 town hall or market hall ===
The first municipal building in Whitchurch was a market hall, also known as the town hall, on the corner of the High Street and St Mary's Street, which was completed in 1718.

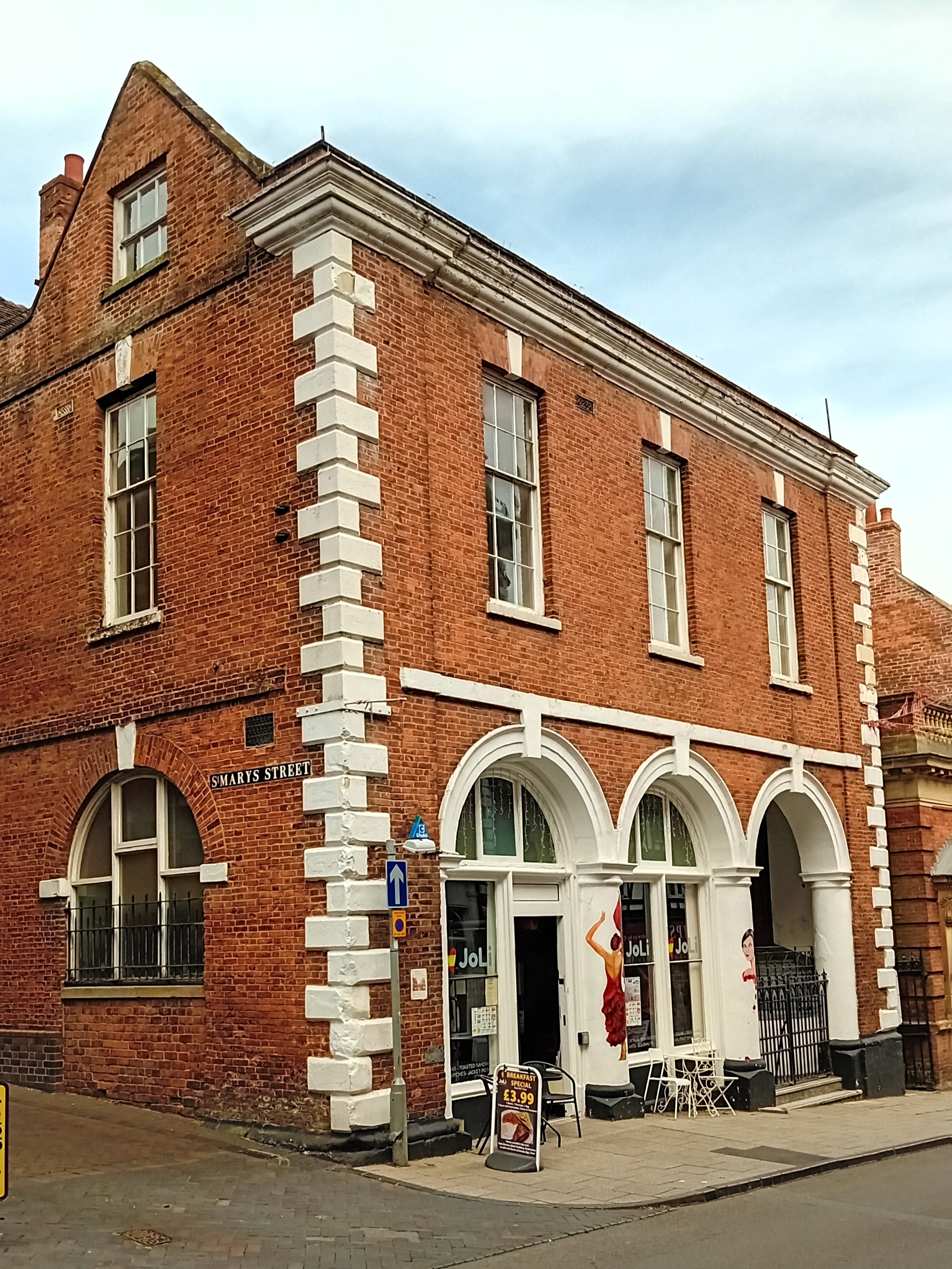
The old town hall of 1718, in use as a coffee shop in 2025

The design involved a symmetrical main frontage of three bays facing onto the High Street. It was arcaded on the ground floor, so that markets could be held with an assembly room on the first floor. After ceasing to serve its original purpose, it was leased to Midland Bank in 1877, and then taken over by Barclays in 1917. Barclays closed the branch in July 2021. As at 2025, this building is in use as a coffee shop.

=== The 1872 town hall ===
Following significant population growth, mainly associated with the brewing and malting industries, a local board was established in Whitchurch in 1860. The new board decided to commission a more substantial municipal building for their meetings. The site they selected was occupied by the Coach and Horses Inn on the northeast side of the High Street.

The new building was designed by Thomas Lockwood in the Gothic Revival style, built in red brick with stone dressings at a cost of £3,000 and was completed in 1872. The design involved a symmetrical main block of seven bays, together with an additional gabled bay which projected forward at the left-hand end. There were segmental headed doorways with hood moulds in the central bay and end bays of the main block. On the first floor, in the central bay, there was a bi-partite mullioned window with cusped heads within an arch containing a quatrefoil in the head. All the other bays were fenestrated by segmental headed windows on the ground floor and by tall windows with cusped heads on the first floor. At roof level there was a modillioned cornice, a parapet and a central bellcote. Internally, the principal rooms were the market hall on the ground floor and a public hall, which was 65 feet (20 m) long and 41 feet (12 m) wide, on the first floor.

The local board was succeeded by Whitchurch Urban District Council in 1894, which continued to meet and have its offices at the town hall. In 1956, the council bought a large house called Pauls Moss on Dodington, and converted it to become its offices and meeting place. The urban district council was abolished in 1967, when Whitchurch was absorbed into the new North Shropshire Rural District.

=== The civic centre ===
In the late 1960s, the rural district council decided to replace the ageing Victorian town hall with a new structure. The new building was designed in the modern style, built in brick and glass and was officially opened on 16 November 1970. The design involved an asymmetrical main frontage of five bays set well back from the High Street. The second bay on the left originally contained a passageway through to St Mary's Street, while the second bay on the right contained a glass doorway into the building. The ground floor was fenestrated by casement windows, and the first floor was fenestrated by a series of canted windows. Internally, the civic centre incorporated a main hall and a market hall.

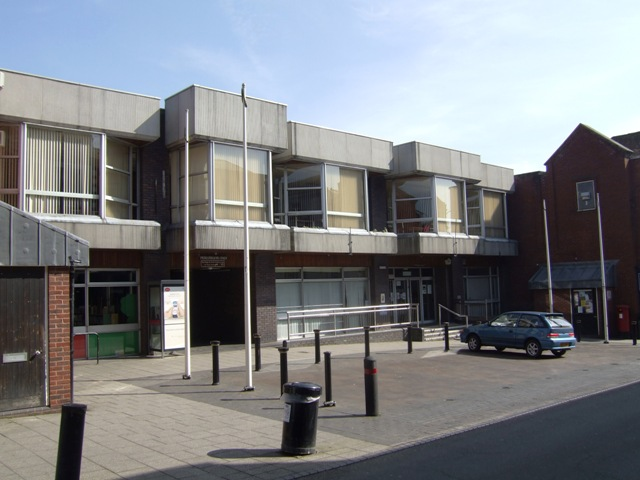
The original 1970 frontage, prior to the 2013 re-fronting

The architectural historian, Nikolaus Pevsner, was unimpressed by the design of the new civic centre which he described as an "inadequate replacement for T. M. Lockwood's town hall of 1872". Following local government re-organisation in 1974, the civic centre accommodated the offices and meeting place of Whitchurch Town Council.

In 2013, the building was refurbished, at a cost of £1.6 million. The work included major changes to the facade, and internal redecoration and replacement of services. The improvements to the façade included a full-height timber framed portico in the second bay on the left, new casement windows on the ground floor, and a new full-width balcony on the first floor, enhanced with timber piers supporting a full-width timber entablature. Behind the balcony, there was a new plate glass wall surmounted by a tall timber parapet. At the time, the venue was used for indoor sports, concerts and film showings, and continued to accommodate the offices of Whitchurch Town Council.

In September 2023, the building was closed, following the discovery of potentially dangerous reinforced autoclaved aerated concrete. Protests were organised by local residents concerned by council proposals to redevelop the site for housing. In March 2024, a working group was established, to investigate options for the building, including leaving the building closed but otherwise doing nothing, replacement of the roof, re-construction of the whole building, or redevelopment of the site.
