= Whitchurch, Shropshire =

Market town in Shropshire, England

Coordinates: 52.969°N 2.682°W

Whitchurch
- Market Town
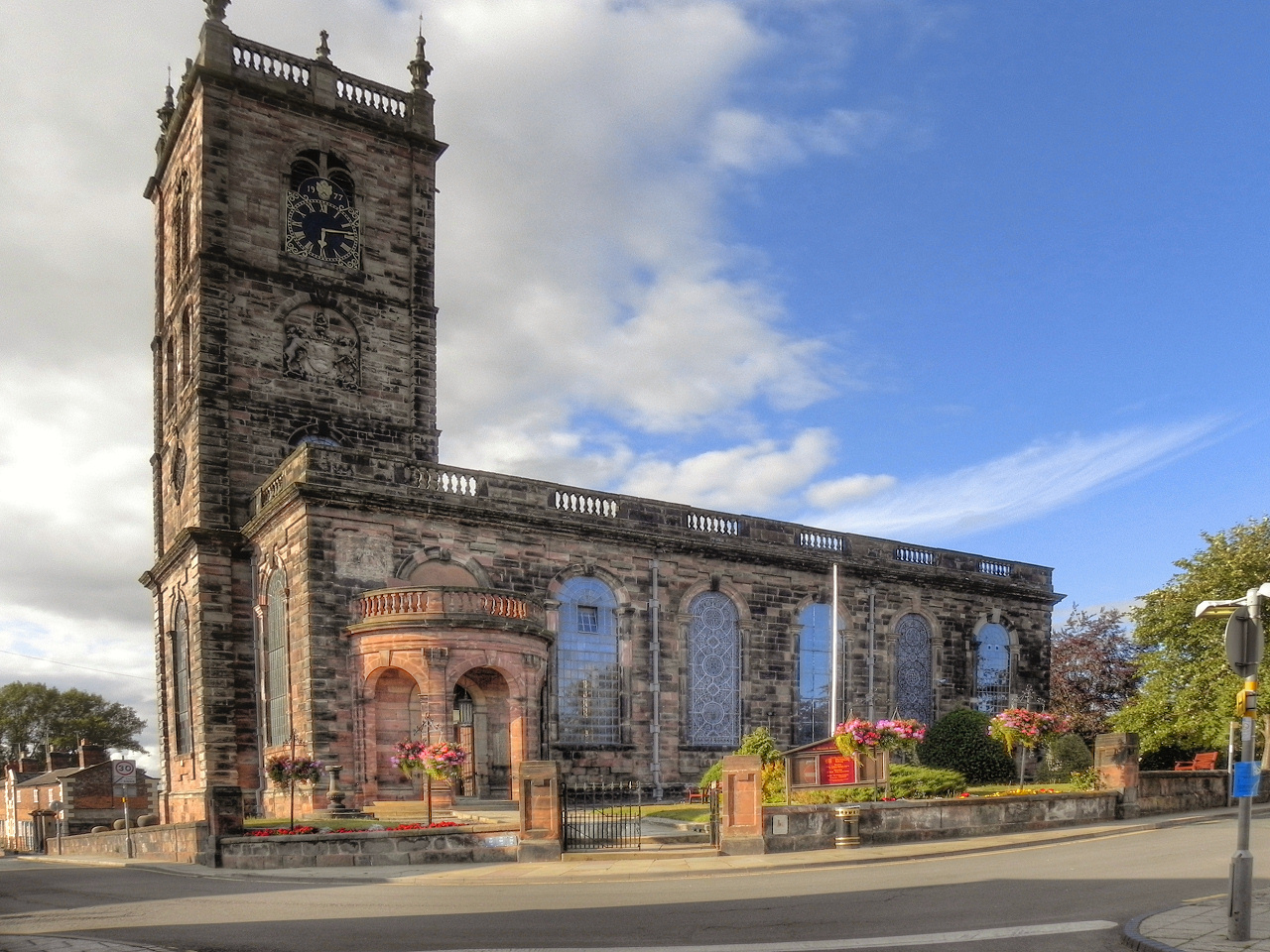
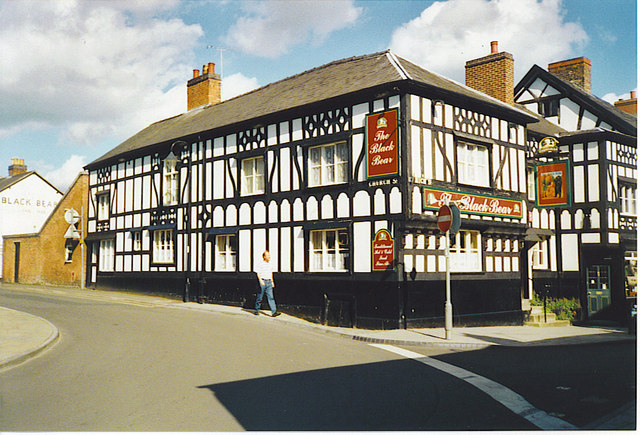
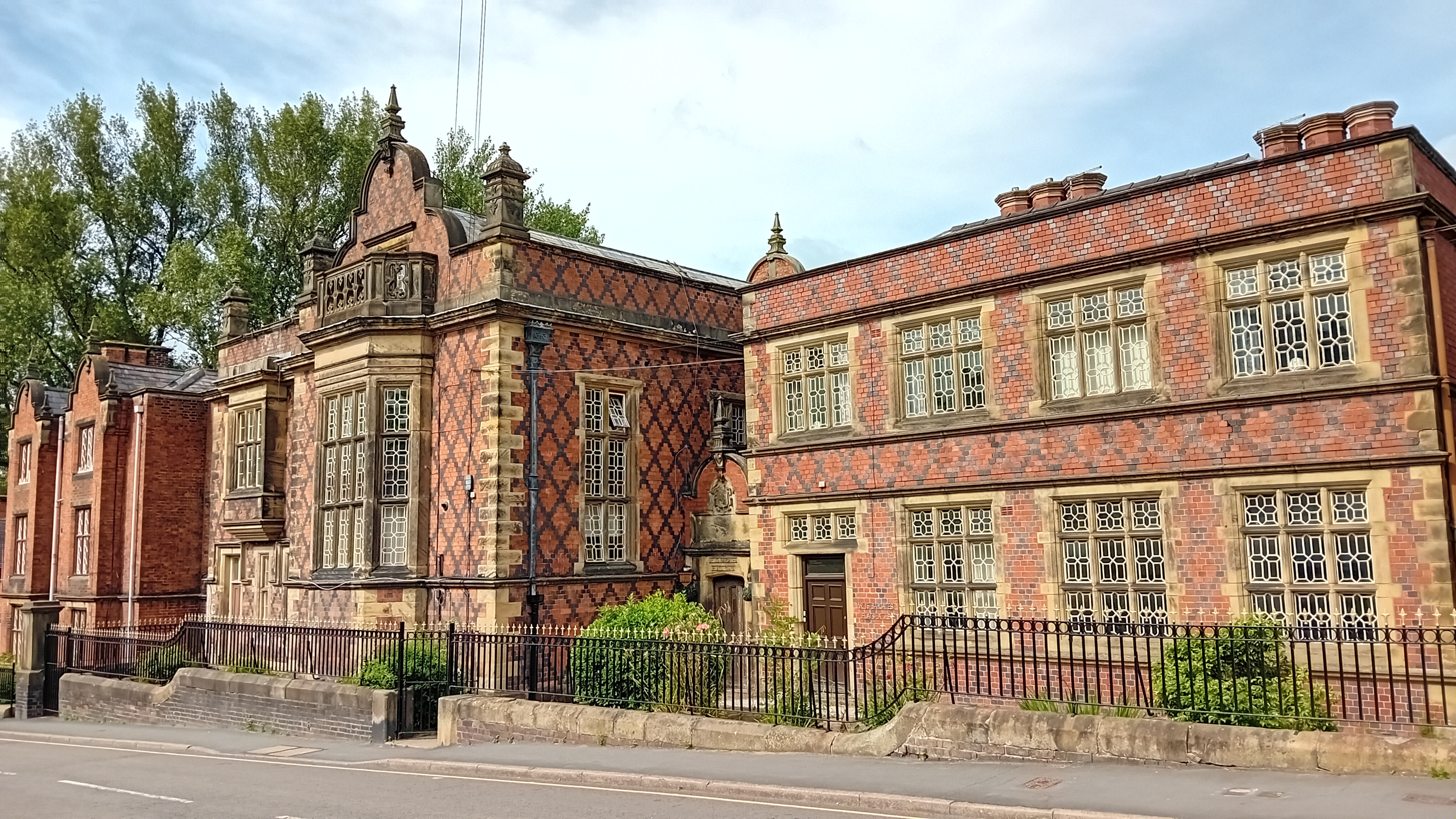
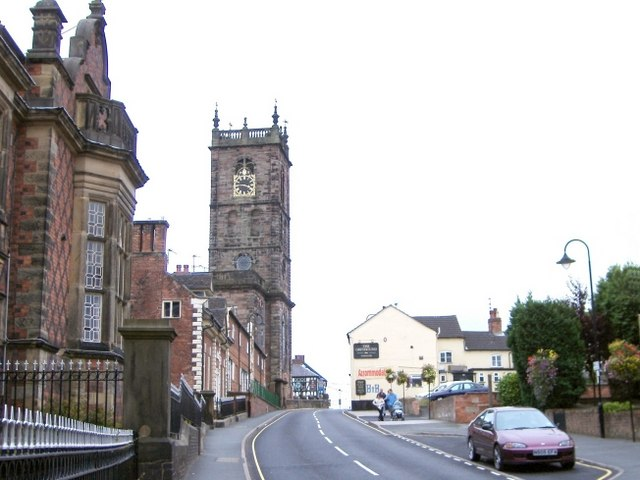
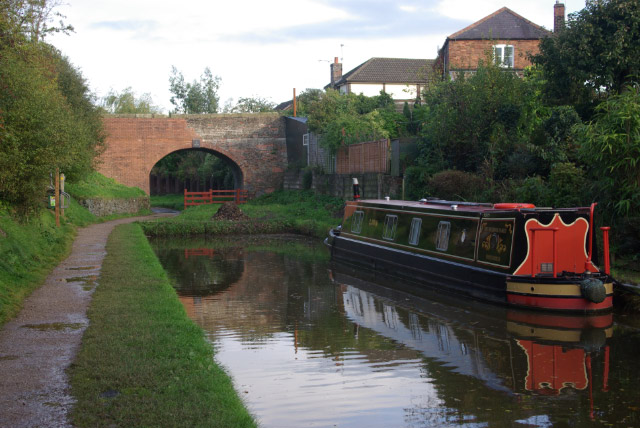
- St Alkmund's Church Black Bear Inn Old Grammar School Bargates Whitchurch Arm

- Location within Shropshire
- Population: 10,142 (Whitchurch Urban parish, 2021); 9,855 (Built up area, 2021)
- OS grid reference: SJ541415
- Civil parish: Whitchurch Urban
- Unitary authority: Shropshire
- Ceremonial county: Shropshire
- Region: West Midlands
- Country: England
- Sovereign state: United Kingdom
- Post town: Whitchurch
- Postcode district: SY13
- Dialling code: 01948
- Police: West Mercia
- Fire: Shropshire
- Ambulance: West Midlands
- UK Parliament: North Shropshire

Whitchurch is a market town in the civil parish of Whitchurch Urban, in the north of Shropshire, England. It lies 2 miles (3 km) east of the Welsh border, 2 miles south of the Cheshire border, 20 miles (30 km) north of the county town of Shrewsbury, 20 miles (30 km) south of Chester, and 15 miles (24 km) east of Wrexham. At the 2021 census, the population of the Whitchurch Urban parish was 10,141, and the population of the Whitchurch built up area was 9,855. Whitchurch is the oldest continuously inhabited town in Shropshire. Notable people who have lived in Whitchurch include the composer Sir Edward German, and illustrator Randolph Caldecott.

== History ==
=== Early times ===
There is evidence from various discovered artefacts that people lived in this area about 3,000 BC. Flakes of flint from the Neolithic era were found in nearby Dearnford Farm.

=== Roman times ===
Originally a settlement founded by the Romans about AD 52–70 called Mediolanum (lit. "Midfield" or "Middle of the Plain"), it stood on a major Roman road between Chester and Wroxeter. It was listed on the Antonine Itinerary but is not the Mediolanum of Ptolemy's Geography, which was in central Wales. Local Roman artefacts can be seen at the Whitchurch Heritage Centre.

In 2016, archaeologists discovered the remains of a Roman wooden trackway, a number of structural timbers, a large amount of Roman pottery and fifteen leather shoes during work on a culvert in Whitchurch. In 2018, a collection of 37 small Roman coins was unearthed at Hollyhurst near Whitchurch. The small denomination, brass or copper alloy coins, known as Dupondii and Asses, were from the reign of the Emperor Trajan, AD 98–117. Some dated back to between AD 69–79 from the time of Emperor Vespasian.

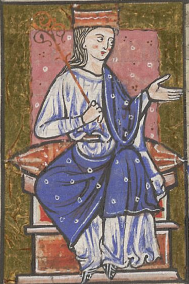
Æthelflæd may have had an Anglo-Saxon fortification or fortified settlement ('Burgh') at Whitchurch, understood to be the Saxon place Weardbyrig

=== Anglo-Saxon times ===
Certain sources suggest that St. Alkmund, the son of Alhred, King of Northumbria (d. c. 800) was first buried in Whitchurch; he was certainly first buried in Shropshire.

It has been suggested that Whitchurch is Weardbyrig, which is the site of a Saxon Burh of Æthelflæd, daughter of Alfred the Great Lady of the Mercians which would have been operational in the early 900s CE.

=== Norman and Medieval ===
In 1066, Whitchurch was called Westune ('west farmstead'), probably for its location on the western edge of Shropshire, bordering the north Welsh Marches. Before the Norman Conquest of England, the area had been held by Harold Godwinson. After the conquest, Whitchurch's location on the marches would require the Lords of Whitchurch to engage in military activity.

By the time it was recorded in the Domesday Book (1086), Whitchurch was held by William de Warenne, 1st Earl of Surrey, and Roger de Montgomery. It was part of the hundred of Hodnet. There was a castle at Whitchurch, possibly built by the same Earl of Surrey, which would predate the birth of Ralph. The Domesday Book estimates that the property was worth £10 annually, having been worth £8 in the reign of Edward the Confessor (1042–1066).

The surrounding hamlets became townships and Dodtune ('the settlement of Dodda's people') is now fully integrated into Whitchurch as Dodington. The first church was built on the hill in AD 912. After the Norman Conquest a motte and bailey castle and a new white Grinshill stone church were built. Westune became Album Monasterium ('White Church'). The name Whitchurch is from the Middle English for "White Church", referring to a church constructed of white stone in the Norman period. The area was also known as Album Monasterium and Blancminster, and the Warennes of Whitchurch were often surnamed de Albo Monasterio in contemporary writings. It is supposed that the church was built by William de Warenne, 1st Earl of Surrey.

During the reign of Henry I in the 12th century, Whitchurch was in the North Division of Bradford Hundred which by the 1820s was referred to as North Bradford Hundred. William fitz Ranulf is the earliest individual of the Warenne family recorded as the Lord of Whitchurch, Shropshire, first appearing in the Shropshire Pipe Roll of 1176. In 1859, Robert Eyton considered it likely that Ralph, son of William de Warenne, 2nd Earl of Surrey, was the father of William and that he first held that title. However, other theories have been put forward.

In 1377 the Whitchurch estates passed to the Talbot family. It was sold by the Talbots to Thomas Egerton, from whom it passed to the earls of Bridgwater and eventually to Earl Brownlow.

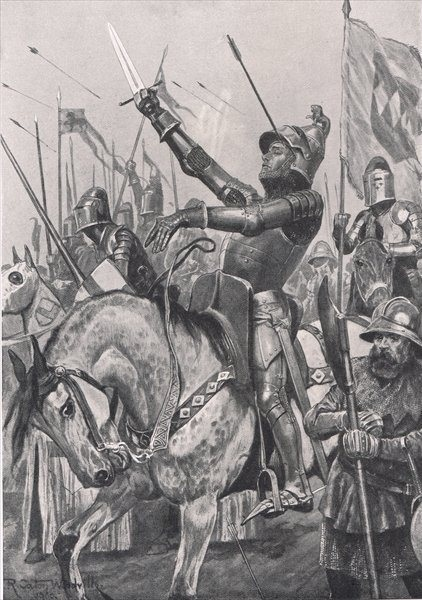
Henry ("Hotspur") Percy was briefly buried in Whitchurch

The town was granted market status in the 14th century.

After the Battle of Shrewsbury, the body of Hotspur was taken by Thomas Neville, 5th Baron Furnivall, to Whitchurch for burial. However, when rumours circulated that Percy was still alive, the king "had the corpse exhumed and displayed it, propped upright between two millstones, in the market place at Shrewsbury".

=== Eighteenth century onwards ===
In the 18th Century many of the earlier timber-framed buildings were refaced in the more fashionable brick. New elegant Georgian houses were built at the southern end of the High Street and in Dodington.

The replacement third church collapsed in July 1711 and the present Queen Anne parish church of St Alkmund was immediately constructed to take its place. It was consecrated in 1712.

As dairy farming became more profitable Whitchurch developed as a centre for Cheshire cheese production. Cheese fairs were held on every third Wednesday when farm cheeses were brought into town for sale. Cheese and other goods could be easily transported to wider markets when the Whitchurch Arm of Thomas Telford's Llangollen Canal was opened in 1811. The railway station was opened in 1858 on the first railway line in North Shropshire, running from Crewe to Shrewsbury.

During the Second World War a secret Y station for enemy signals interception operated in Whitchurch at the Old Rectory in Claypit Street, run by the Foreign Office.

On 23 November 1981, an F1/T2 tornado passed through Whitchurch as part of the record-breaking nationwide tornado outbreak on that day. The Whitchurch tornado was the longest-lived tornado of the entire outbreak, having first touched down 35 miles (56 km) away in the south Shropshire village of Norbury. After passing through Whitchurch, the tornado dissipated.

== Governance ==
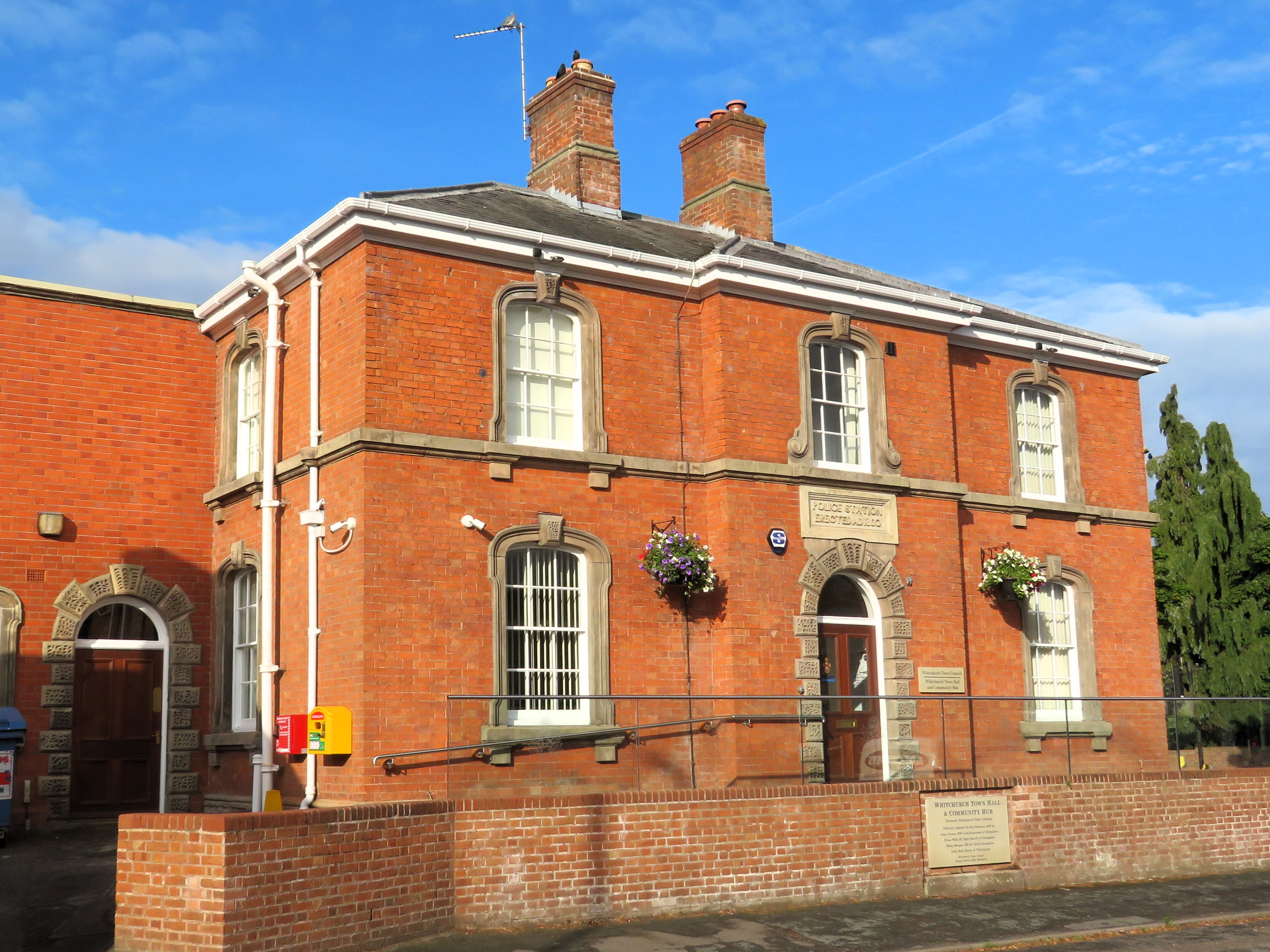
Old Police Station, 2 Station Road: Built 1860, closed as police station 2018. Serving as temporary town hall since 2024.

There are two tiers of local government covering Whitchurch, at parish (town) and unitary authority level: Whitchurch Town Council and Shropshire Council. Since 2024, the town council has been based at a temporary town hall and community hub in the former police station at 2 Station Road, after structural problems were identified at Whitchurch Civic Centre.

The town is located within the North Shropshire parliamentary constituency.

=== Administrative history ===
Whitchurch was an ancient parish, which straddled the North Bradford hundred of Shropshire and the Nantwich hundred of Cheshire. The parish was subdivided into fourteen townships, being Alkington, Ash Magna, Ash Parva, Black Park, Broughall, Dodington, Edgeley, Hinton, Hollyhurst and Chinnel, New Woodhouse, Old Woodhouse, Tilstock, Wirswall, and a Whitchurch township covering the town itself. The Wirswall township was in Cheshire; the rest of the parish was in Shropshire. (Note: Some sources also include Marbury in Cheshire as having been part of Whitchurch parish. This appears to be on the basis of various 19th century sources from a time when Marbury and Whitchurch were a single benefice sharing their clergy, an arrangement which ended in 1870; contemporary sources nevertheless described Marbury as a separate parish prior to 1870.) From the 17th century onwards, parishes were gradually given various civil functions under the poor laws, in addition to their original ecclesiastical functions. In some cases, the civil functions were exercised by subdivisions of the parish rather than the parish as a whole. In the case of Whitchurch, the parish was split into two parts for administering the poor laws: the Cheshire township of Wirswall, and the rest of the parish in Shropshire. In 1866, the legal definition of 'parish' was changed to be the areas used for administering the poor laws, and so Wirswall and Whitchurch became separate civil parishes.

In 1860, a local government district called Whitchurch and Dodington was created covering those two townships, administered by an elected local board. Under the Local Government Act 1894, such districts were reconstituted as urban districts. Shortly afterwards, in January 1895, the name of the urban district was changed from Whitchurch and Dodington to Whitchurch. The 1894 act also directed that civil parishes could no longer straddle district boundaries, and so the parish of Whitchurch was split into a Whitchurch Urban parish matching the urban district and a Whitchurch Rural parish outside the urban district. At the 1891 census (the last one before the parish was split into urban and rural parishes) the civil parish had a population of 6,647.

Whitchurch Urban District was abolished in 1967, when its area was redesignated as a rural parish (but retaining the name 'Whitchurch Urban') and placed in the new North Shropshire Rural District. The rural district was replaced by the larger North Shropshire district in 1974. That district was in turn abolished in 2009. Shropshire County Council then took over district-level functions, making it a unitary authority, and was renamed Shropshire Council. The civil parish covering the town is still officially called Whitchurch Urban, but its parish council omits the 'urban' from its name, calling itself Whitchurch Town Council.

== Landmarks ==
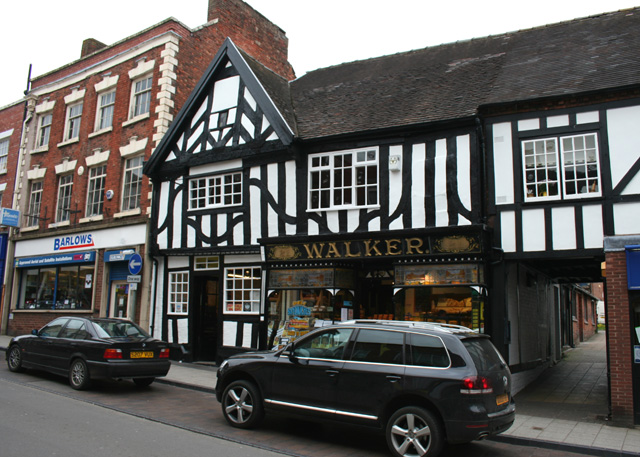
High Street shops, Whitchurch

=== Buildings ===
There are currently over 100 listed buildings in Whitchurch, including the churches detailed in the religion section lower down.

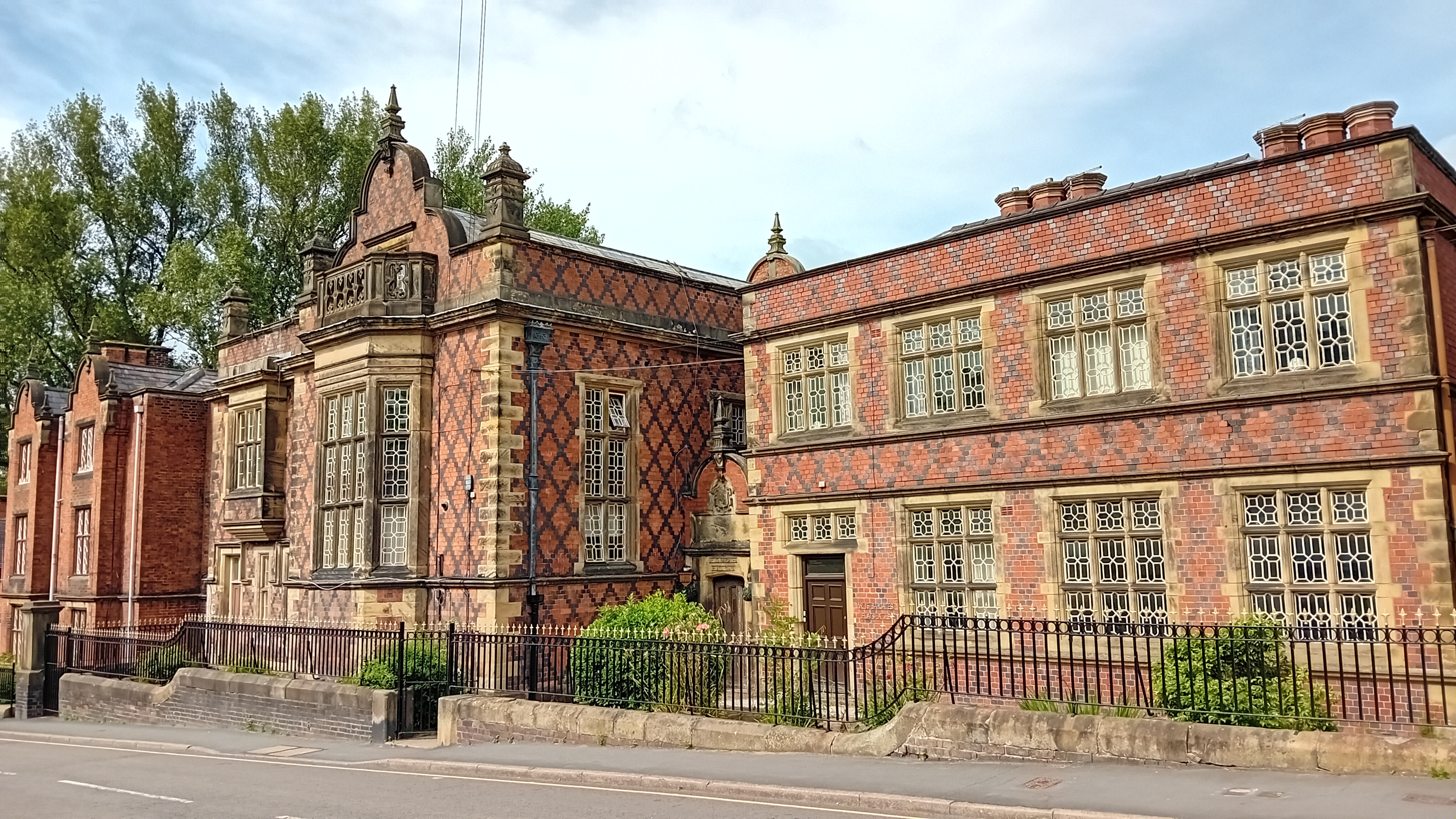
Old Grammar School, Bargates

St Alkmund's Church (rebuilt 1712–13) is a prominent landmark in the town and a Grade I listed building. Other notable landmarks include the former almhouses founded by Samuel Higginson (1697) and the former girls' school founded by Jane Higginson (1708) and the old Whitchurch Grammar School which was founded in 1548. The grammar school building dates from 1708 (Grade II listed) and was latterly used as an infants' school. Further buildings were added in 1848 and 1926. All have now been converted into flats.

Two of the oldest buildings in Whitchurch include the Old Eagles pub built in the 16th century and 17, 19 and 21 Watergate Street, otherwise known as Raven Yard Antiques. The properties 17, 19 and 21 Watergate were first built in 1625 and were called the Raven's Inn. Over the last four centuries, the Raven's Inn has seen a great deal of alteration but more recently has seen a significant part of the property restored to its original half timbered facade. 17-19 Watergate exists as a private property and 21 Watergate is now called Raven Yard Antiques, a family owned antiques business with a speciality in Victorian military uniforms.

=== Streets ===
The street names in the town centre reflect the changing history of the town.

- Roman: Pepper Street, a common name in former Roman settlements. It is a derivation of the Roman Via Piperatica, the street on which pepper and spices were sold.
- Norse: Several streets end in 'gate' which is Norse for street (e.g., Watergate, Highgate, Bargates). Watergate Street being named after the old Medieval or Roman Watergate which used to exist. Others refer to the castle which was located here (e.g., Castle Hill or Yardington referring to the castle yard).
- Modern: Some refer to local industry (e.g., Claypit Street, clay was used for making bricks; Mill Street, named after the local water mill; and Bark Hill, bark was used for tanning.

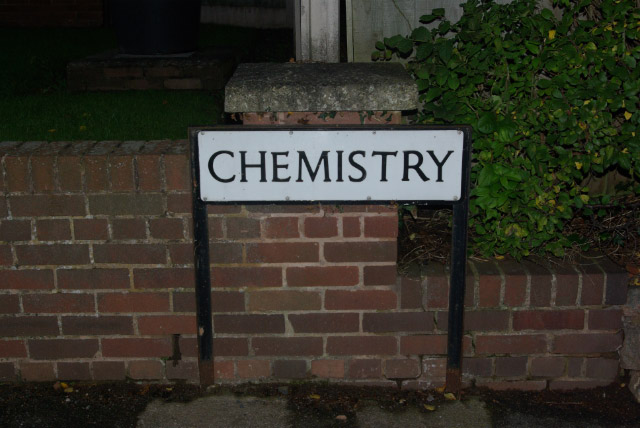
Chemistry, Whitchurch

=== Place names ===
The areas of Whitchurch have interesting names. These include:

- Dodington – this is derived from Dodtune (the settlement of the people of Dodda – a local Anglo-Saxon chieftain)
- Chemistry – this is derived from an oak-acid making business located nearby which was used in the tanning industry in the town

== Transport ==
=== Roads ===
Whitchurch is a primary destination on the British road network, signed from as far away as Warrington on the A49, and Wolverhampton on the A41. The bypass around the town shared by both roads opened in 1992. Whitchurch also has roads to Wrexham, Nantwich, Chester, Shrewsbury and Newcastle-under-Lyme. There are bus services from Whitchurch to surrounding settlements including Chester, Nantwich, Wrexham and Shrewsbury.

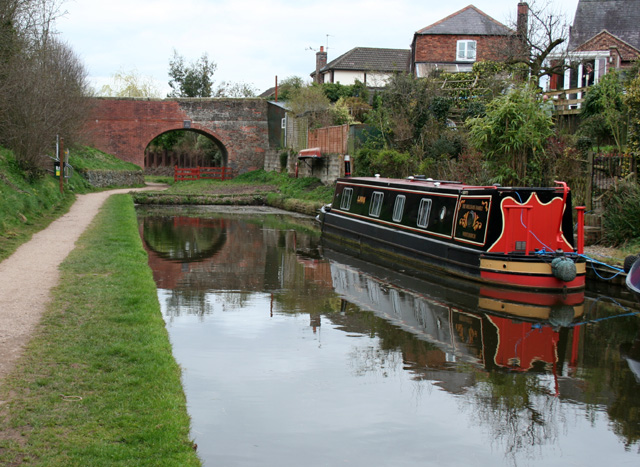
Stub of the Whitchurch Arm of the Llangollen Canal

=== Railway ===
Whitchurch railway station is on the former London and North Western (later part of the LMS) line from Crewe down the English side of the Welsh border (the Welsh Marches Line) toward Cardiff.

Whitchurch was once the junction for the main line of the Cambrian Railways, but the section from Whitchurch to Welshpool (Buttington Junction), via Ellesmere, Whittington, Oswestry and Llanymynech, was closed on 18 January 1965 in favour of the more viable alternative route via Shrewsbury. Whitchurch was also the junction for the Whitchurch and Tattenhall Railway or Chester to Whitchurch branch line, another part of the London and North Western, running via Malpas. The line was closed to regular services on 16 September 1957, but use by diverted passenger trains continued until 8 December 1963.

=== Canal ===
Whitchurch has its own short arm of the Llangollen Canal and the town centre can be reached by a walk of approximately a mile along the Whitchurch Waterways Country Park, the last stage of the Sandstone Trail. The Whitchurch Arm is managed by a charity group of local volunteers.

In December 2025, the canal emptied following a collapse of the bank, leaving several boats stranded. The canal is currently being repaired under management of the Canal and River Trust and contractor, Keir.

== Economy ==
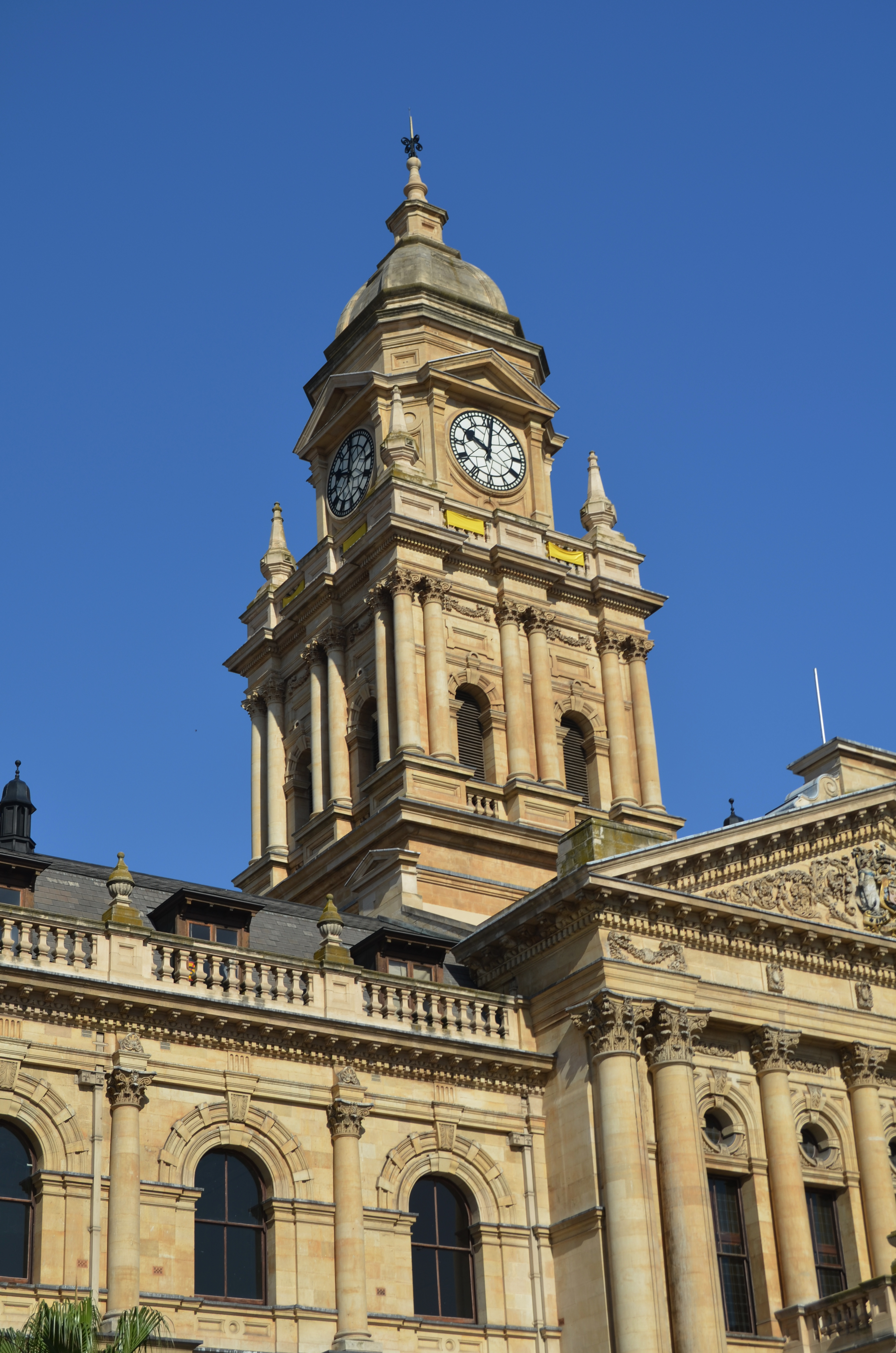
Cape Town City Hall, Clock Tower, with its clock supplied by J. B. Joyce & Co. of Whitchurch

Historically the town has been the centre of cheese-making. Today Belton Cheese continues to be a major employer. It has been in existence since 1922.

The major employer in the town now is Grocontinental, a logistics provider to the food industry, which employs over 350 people. This family firm which was established in 1941 was taken over by the Dutch multinational AGRO Merchants in 2017, which was then subsequently sold to Americold in December 2020, for a reported $1.74 billion.

The town also provides a range of services for the surrounding countryside of the North Shropshire Plain. The majority of retail stores in Whitchurch are small to medium-sized businesses concentrated in the High Street, Watergate street and Green End. There is a Tesco supermarket in the town centre (White Lion Meadow), a smaller Lidl store and a larger Sainsbury's supermarket in London Road. An Aldi store opened on the edge of town in 2020.

The town was the home of the J. B. Joyce tower clocks company, established in 1690, the earliest tower clock-making company in the world, which earned Whitchurch a reputation as the home of tower clocks. Joyce's timepieces can be found as far afield as Singapore, Kabul and Cape Town (see right). The firm also helped to build Big Ben in London. However, J. B. Joyce have now left and an auction house has moved into the building. Whitchurch also has a local chamber of commerce recently retitled as the Whitchurch Business Group, an organisation setup with the aim of improving the town's business environment.

By rail Whitchurch is within commuting distance of Liverpool and Manchester (both about one hour north) and Shrewsbury (30 minutes south).

== Arts and culture ==
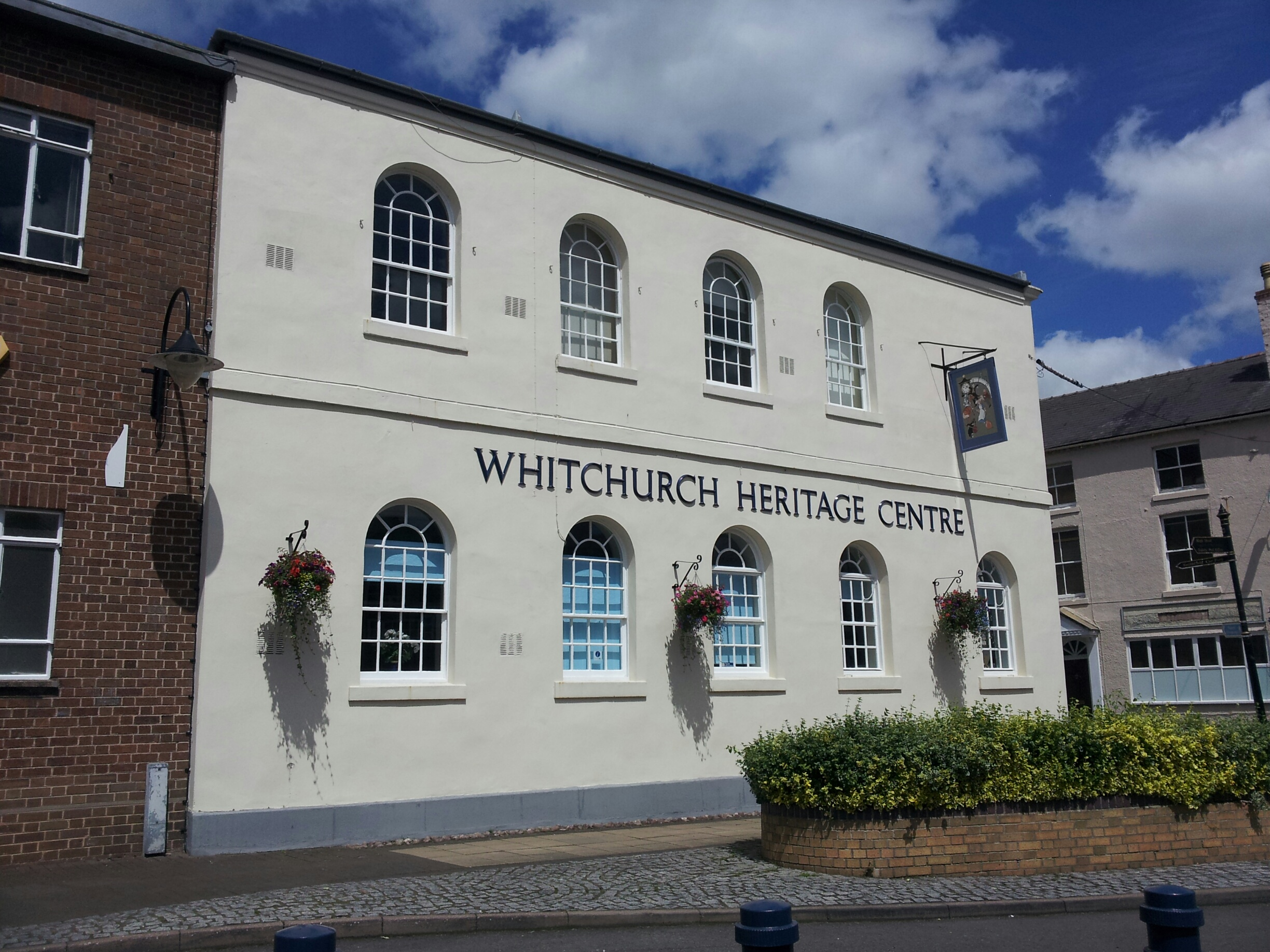
Whitchurch Heritage Centre

There are a wide range of arts and culture activities, festivals and facilities and societies in Whitchurch.

=== Cultural activities ===
- Poetry Whitchurch run poetry activities throughout the year, including:
  - Poetry open mic: new poetry performances, held on the third Monday of every month alternating between Percy's Cafe bar and online
  - Poetry discussion groups held roughly once every month at Vinyl Countdown record shop
  - Poetry development groups, held in person and online, mentoring and developing local poets
  - Poetry slams: spoken-word competitions held once each year, where competitors take each other on to win a prize

=== Cultural venues and facilities ===
- Alderford Lake - various cultural performances throughout the year
- Whitchurch Civic Centre – hosts various performances throughout the year. It also contains a public library.
- Whitchurch Heritage Centre.
- Talbot Theatre – located in the Leisure Centre at the Sir John Talbot School. It offers regular theatrical and musical events as well as film.
- Doodle Alley.
- Whitchurch Amateur Operatic and Dramatic Society.
- Whitchurch Little Theatre Group on Facebook.
- Whitchurch Swimming and Fitness Centre

=== Festivals ===
- Blackberry Fair
- Party in the Park
- Whitchurch Food and Drink festival
- Annual Christmas Light Switch on and Christmas Markets

The periodic televised Sir Edward German Music Festival, hosted by St Alkmund's and St John's churches, also uses Sir John Talbot's Technology College as a venue. The first festival was held in 2006 and the second in April 2009. Participants have included local choirs and primary schools, including Prees, Lower Heath and White House, as well as internationally known musicians and orchestras.

=== Historic cultural activities ===
On 19 January 1963 The Beatles played in the old Town Hall Ballroom (now the location of the town Civic Centre). That night a recording of the group appeared on the television show Thank Your Lucky Stars, an appearance which changed their fortunes. "Please Please Me" had just been released as a single.

== Sport ==
Whitchurch Rugby Club currently competes in the Midlands 1 West league, the sixth tier of English rugby. Founded in 1936, the club plays at Edgeley Park and has a full complement of mini rugby and junior teams as well as under-19s (Colts), a ladies team and four senior teams. In 1998–99, it was promoted to National Division Three North, a position it maintained until the 2002–03 season.

The local football club, Whitchurch Alport F.C., was founded in 1946. It is named after Alport Farm in Alport Road, which was the home of local footballer, Coley Maddocks, killed in the Second World War. They were founder members of the Cheshire Football League and played in that league until 2012, before a spell in the Mercian Regional Football League. In 2015 Alport were promoted to the North West Counties Football League, before being transferred to the Midland League Premier Division in 2021.

The Chester Road Bowling Club has been in existence since 1888. It was originally a bowling and tennis club. It has over 160 members and fields 23 teams (mostly men and women) in six different leagues. Another bowling club, the Whitchurch and District, was founded in 1924.

Whitchurch Leisure Centre is located at the Sir John Talbot School on the edge of town. It offers a range of exercise facilities and classes.

The Whitchurch Walkers is an active group of residents interested in walking and the protection of footpaths. It organises a range of events, including an annual walking festival. The Sandstone Trail starts/end at the Whitchurch arm of the canal. It forms part of the Shropshire Way.

On the northern edge of the town is the Macdonald Hill Valley Hotel, which has a fitness centre, a swimming pool and two golf courses.

Since August 2019, Alderford Lake, just to the south of the town, has hosted a parkrun, which is a free, weekly timed 5 km run/walk, every Saturday morning at 9am.

== Local media ==
Regional local news and television programmes are provided by BBC West Midlands and ITV Central. Television signals are received from the Wrekin TV transmitter.

Local radio stations are BBC Radio Shropshire on 96.0 FM, Hits Radio Black Country & Shropshire on 103.1 FM, Capital North West & Wales on 103.4 FM and Greatest Hits Radio Black Country & Shropshire on 107.1 FM.

The Whitchurch Herald and Shropshire Star are the town's local newspapers.

== Education ==
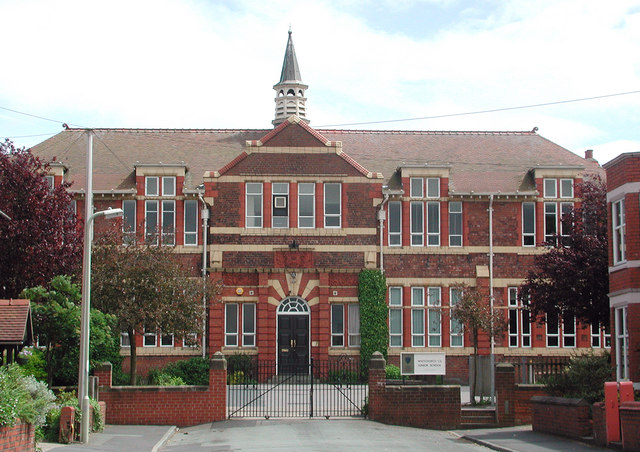
Whitchurch CE Junior School

Whitchurch has a long history of schools. Whitchurch Grammar School was established in 1548 by Rev Sir John Talbot, the Rector of Whitchurch in the 1540s. The school opened in 1550 making it one of the oldest schools in England. It was restricted to boys. Next door to it a school for girls was established. They both closed in 1936 and became part of the new Sir John Talbot’s School which is located on the edge of the town. It has about 500 students aged 11–18. This school is now part of the Marches Academy Trust.

The main primary school in the town is Whitchurch CE Junior School, which has about 300 pupils aged 7–11. Younger children attend Whitchurch CE Infant and Nursery School.

There is an active branch of the University of the Third Age with over 350 members.

== Religion ==
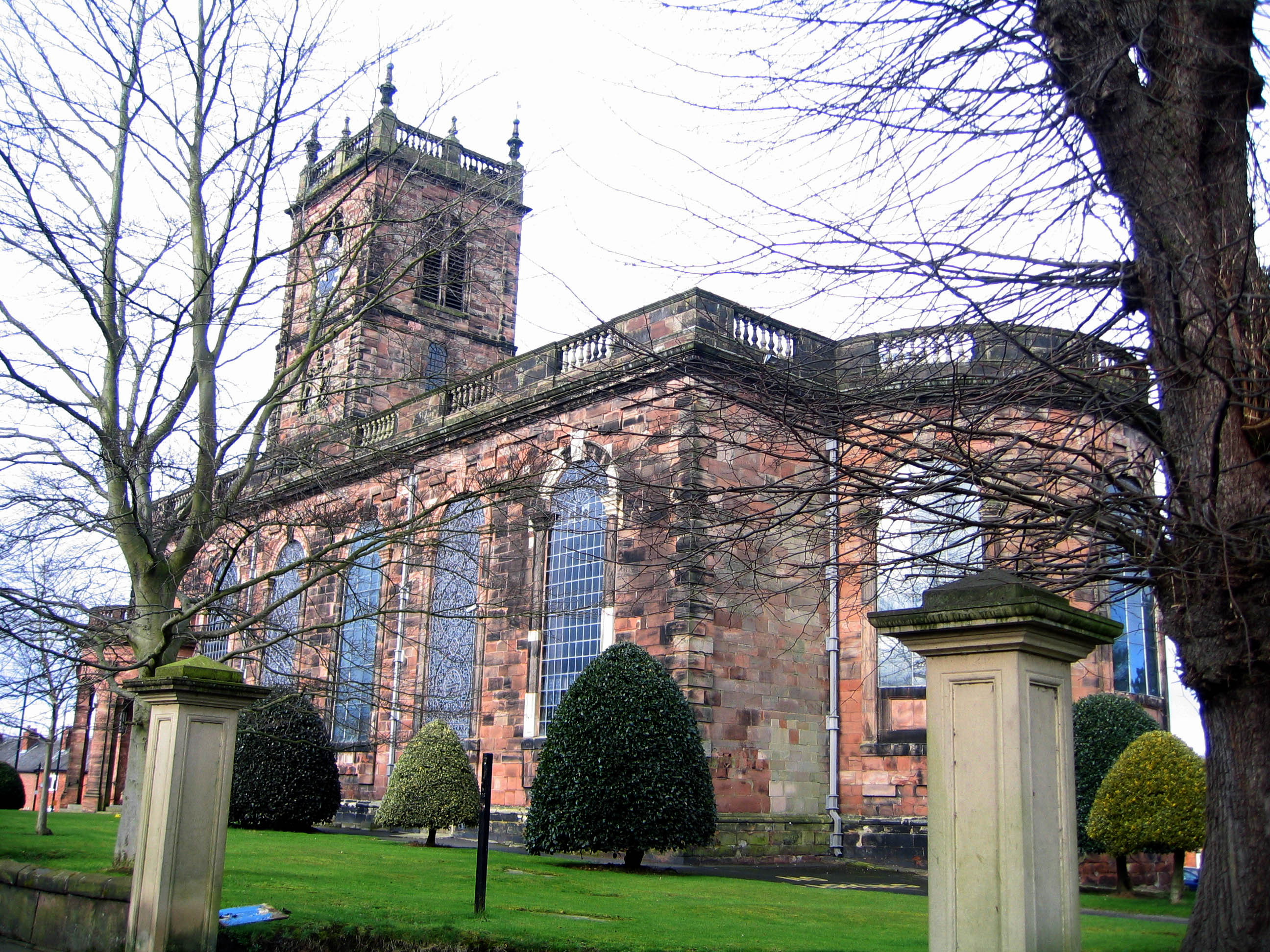
St Alkmund's Church, Whitchurch

The town's most prominent place of worship is St Alkmund's Church of England parish church, built in 1712 of red sandstone on the site of a Norman church. It is a Grade I listed building. St Catherine's in Dodington was built in 1836 as a chapel of ease for St Alkmund's, which at that time was over-crowded. It is Grade II listed, but ceased to be used for worship in the 1970s. It featured in the 1995 BBC One Foot in the Past programme, when it was being used as a builder's store. It has now been converted into apartments.

John Wesley, the founder of the Methodist movement, preached in Whitchurch on 18 April 1781. St John's Methodist Church, built in 1879, stands on the corner of St John's Street and Brownlow Street. It is Grade II listed. The Wesleyan Chapel in St Mary's Street, which opened in 1810, closed shortly after St John's opened and is now the Whitchurch Heritage Centre. The Primitive Methodist Chapel in Castle Hill opened in 1866 and closed in the 1970s.

The Dodington United Reformed (formerly Congregational) Church (built in 1815 and Grade II listed) is now closed, as is the Dodington Presbyterian Chapel (built in 1707). A Baptist chapel was built in Green End in 1820 but closed in 1939; it is now an antique showroom.

St George's Catholic Church has been located in Claypit Street since 1878.

Whitchurch Cemetery includes 91 Commonwealth War Graves Commission (CWGC) burials: 24 from the First World War, in scattered plots, and 67 from the Second World War, mostly grouped in a CWGC section; 52 of the latter are Polish or Czechoslovak, as No. 4 Polish General Hospital was at Iscoyd Park just over the border in Wales. The ashes of locally born composer Sir Edward German are also buried at the cemetery.

== Notable people ==
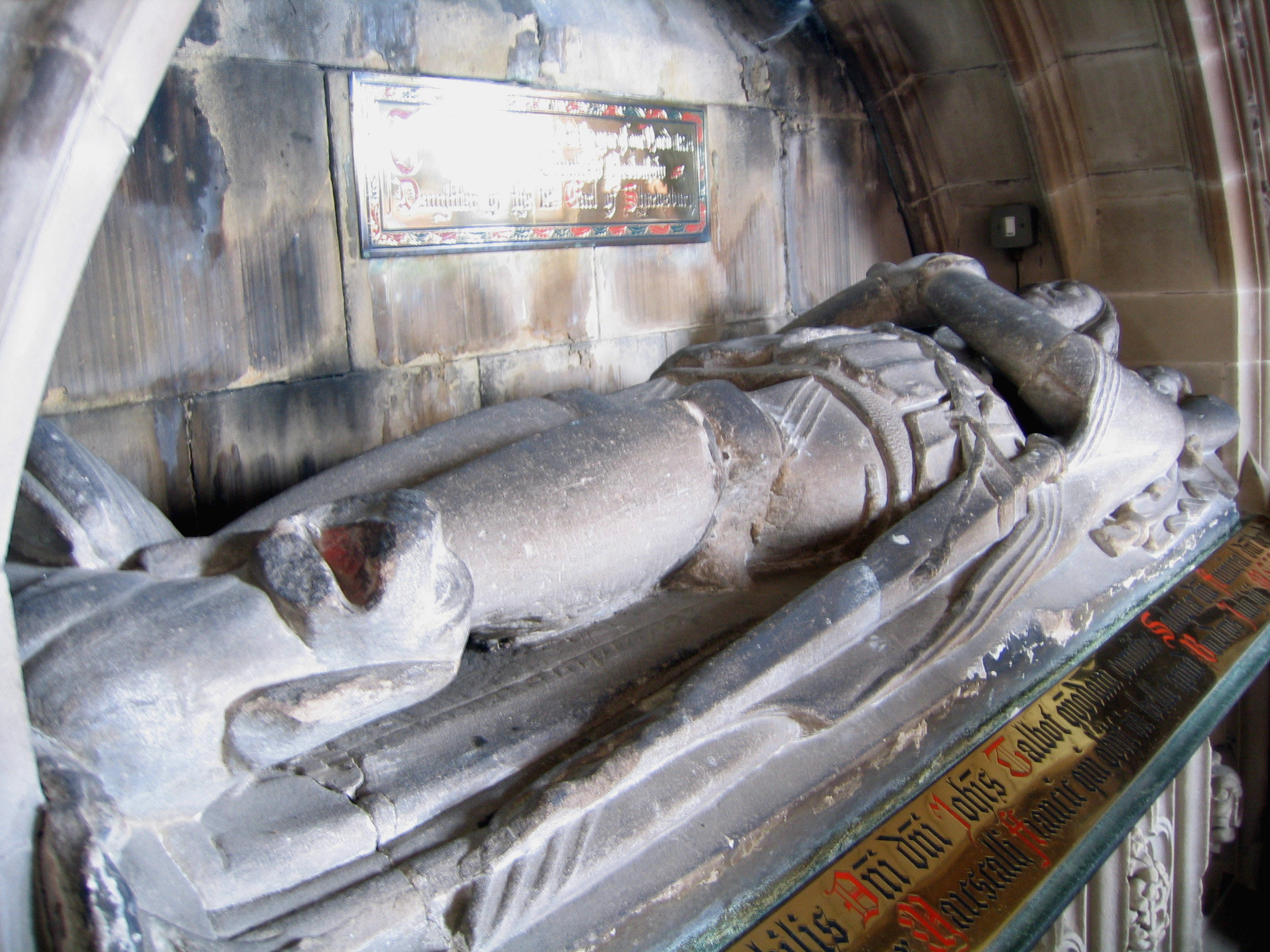
Sir John Talbot's effigy in St Alkmund's Church

- Sir Henry Percy (Sir Harry Hotspur) (1364–1403), killed at the Battle of Shrewsbury and buried in Whitchurch, only for his body to be later exhumed and quartered.
- John Talbot, 1st Earl of Shrewsbury (c. 1384–1453), a warrior commander who in 1429 fought French armies inspired by Joan of Arc. His heart is buried under the porch of St Alkmund's Church. Talbot is a major character in Shakespeare's Henry VI, Part I.
- Rev. Sir John Talbot (c. 1490–1549), Rector of Whitchurch in 1540s, founded Whitchurch Grammar School, it closed in 1938 and moved to Sir John Talbot’s School.
- Sir Allan Cotton (ca. 1568 ― 1628) local merchant who was Lord Mayor of London in 1625.
- Abraham Wheelock (1593–1653), linguist, first Adams Professor of Arabic at Cambridge University
- Nicholas Bernard (c. 1600–1661), pamphleteer, former dean of Ardagh in Ireland and chaplain to Oliver Cromwell, was appointed rector of the parish in 1660 and buried at St Alkmund's.
- Joseph Bromfield (1744 probably in Whitchurch–1824), notable English plasterer and architect
- Reginald Heber (1783–1826), Rector of Hodnet and Bishop of Calcutta attended Whitchurch Grammar School.
- Thomas Corser (1793 in Whitchurch–1876), literary scholar and Church of England clergyman.

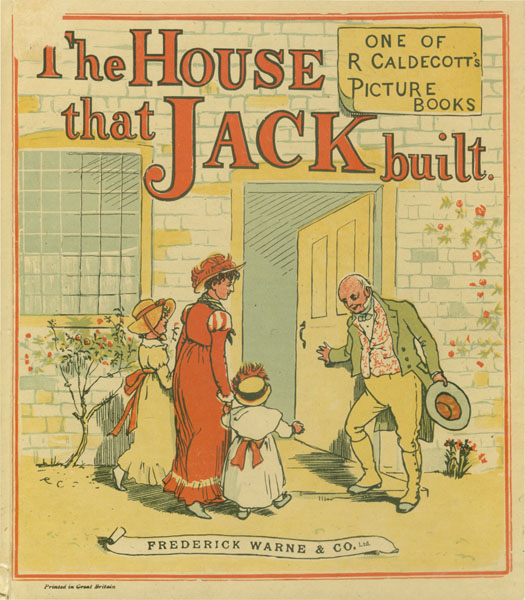
This Is the House That Jack Built, a book illustrated by Randolph Caldecott.

- Randolph Caldecott (1846–1886), illustrator, lived in the town, the town's buildings feature in his work.
- Sir Edward German (1862 in Whitchurch–1936), composer, was born in the town in what is now a pub: the Old Town Hall Vaults. He is buried in the local cemetery and commemorated in a local street.
- Lucy Appleby (1920–2008), traditional cheesemaker
- Elizabeth Fritsch (born 1940 in Whitchurch) is a studio potter and ceramic artist.
- Lorna Sage (1943 in Whitchurch – 2001), literary critic and author, attended the girls' high school.
- Owen Paterson (born 1956 in Whitchurch) former environment secretary and Conservative MP for North Shropshire 1997-2021
- Judy Hunt, (born 1957) previously Archdeacon of Suffolk, has been resident Rector of Whitchurch.
- Kate Long, (born 1964) novelist, author of The Bad Mother's Handbook, moved to Whitchurch in 1990.
- Christina Trevanion (born 1981), partner in auctioneering firm of Trevanion & Dean, and TV personality.

=== Sports ===
- Jack Wright (1910 in Whitchurch - 2003), rugby union footballer.
- George Antonio (1914 in Whitchurch - 1997), footballer, lived locally until age 3, played 203 games including Stoke City.
- Stuart Mason (1948 in Whitchurch – 2008), footballer, played over 320 games began his career with Whitchurch Alport F.C.

== Twin town ==
Whitchurch is twinned with Neufchâtel-en-Bray, France.

== See also ==
- Listed buildings in Whitchurch Rural
- Listed buildings in Whitchurch Urban

== Sources ==
- Walker, Simon (2004). "Percy, Sir Henry (1364–1403), soldier". Oxford Dictionary of National Biography (online ed.). Oxford University Press. doi:10.1093/ref:odnb/21931. (Subscription, Wikipedia Library access or UK public library membership required.)
