= Sir John Talbot's School =

Location
- Tilstock Road; Whitchurch, Shropshire, SY13 2BY; England; 52.95839°N 2.67742°W

Information
- Type: Academy
- Motto: Prest d'accomplir (ready to accomplish)
- Trust: Marches Academy Trust
- Department for Education URN: 141176 Tables
- Ofsted: Reports
- Co-Chairs of Local Governing Body: Sue Ricketts and Nicci Vasey
- Head teacher: Tim Stonall
- Gender: Mixed
- Age: 11 to 18
- Houses: Brown Moss, Blake Mere, Oss Mere, Red Brook, Alderford
- Colours: Grey and Yellow
- Website: sirjohntalbots.co.uk

Sir John Talbot's School is a coeducational secondary school in Whitchurch, Shropshire, England, for pupils aged between 11 and 18, with a sixth form. The most recent inspection report was in April 2017 and resulted in a judgement of good in all five aspects of the inspection. In September 2014 the school reopened as an academy as part of the Marches Academy Trust with a new head teacher Mr David John O'Toole. Mr Tim Stonall was appointed headteacher in May 2020.

== Extracurricular activities ==
Sir John Talbot's offers different extracurricular activities for the students such as Computer Club, Homework Club, Vex Club (STEM), Performing Arts Club and Sports Club. The school also participates in the Duke of Edinburgh's Award Scheme.

== Location ==
The school is in the small market town Whitchurch in North Shropshire. The catchment area is Whitchurch itself and the surrounding villages. The school sits in mature grounds.

== Notable pupils ==
- Stuart Mason - professional footballer

== Leisure centre ==
Whitchurch Leisure Centre, available for community use, is located at the Sir John Talbot School on the edge of town. It offers a range of exercise facilities and classes.
