= List of Old King's Scholars =

This is a list of some notable former pupils of The King's School, Canterbury, known as Old King's Scholars (abbreviated as OKS). The term King's Scholar referred to the few boys who, by their academic ability at a very young age, won scholarships to King's.

== Art ==
- Shoo Rayner (born 1956), children's author and illustrator
- Edmund de Waal OBE (born 1964), artist, potter, and author

== Business ==
- Sir Ian Cheshire (born 1959), chairman of Barclays UK and former CEO of Kingfisher plc
- Sir Nicholas Lyons (born 1958), financier and 694th Lord Mayor of London
- Charles Powell, Baron Powell of Bayswater, KCMG (born 1941), diplomat, businessman and foreign policy adviser to Margaret Thatcher
- Sir Hugh Robertson (politician) KCMG PC DL (born 1962), chairman of the British Olympic Association and the Camelot Group, former MP for Faversham and Mid Kent, Minister of State, and Minister for Sport
- Trevor Swete (1945-2025), banker

== Engineering, science and medicine ==
- Roger C. Field (born 1945), inventor
- Michael Foale CBE (born 1957), astrophysicist and former NASA astronaut
- William Harvey (1578–1657), physician
- Sir Tony Hoare FRS FREng (born 1934), computer scientist
- Thomas Linacre (c. 1460–1524), humanist scholar and physician
- Nick Maynard, (born 1962) surgeon and humanitarian
- Thomas Stapleton (1920-2007), paediatrician
- John Tradescant the Younger (1608–1662), botanist and gardener

== Film, television and theatre ==
- Derek Bond (1920-2006) actor
- Oz Clarke OBE (born 1949), wine writer and television presenter and broadcaster
- Charles Frend (1909–1977), film director and editor
- David Gower OBE (born 1957), cricket commentator, former cricketer and captain of the England cricket team
- John Lloyd CBE (born 1951), television and radio comedy writer and producer
- Leslie Mitchell (1905–1985), British radio and television announcer
- Christopher Neame (writer/producer) (1942-2011), film producer and screenwriter
- Michael Powell (1905–1990), filmmaker
- Sir Carol Reed (1906–1976), film director
- Tom Ward (born 1971), film, stage and television actor
- Antony Worrall Thompson (born 1951), restaurateur, celebrity chef, television presenter and radio broadcaster

== History and philosophy ==
- Catherine Conybeare (born 1966), academic and philologist
- Hugh Honour (1927–2016), art historian
- Jeremy Lawrance FBA (born 1952), linguist and historian
- Thomas Linacre (c. 1460–1524), humanist scholar and physician
- Walter Pater (1839–1894), essayist, literary and art critic, fiction writer and humanist
- George Sale, (1697–1736), Orientalist scholar and solicitor
- Alan Watts (1915–1973), writer and philosopher
- William Wyse (1860–1929), classical scholar

== Literature ==
- Sebastian Barker FRSL (1945–2014), poet
- Richard Boys (1785–1867), Anglican clergyman, chaplain on St. Helena and author
- Michael Cordy, novelist
- David Edwards OBE (1929–2018), former Dean of Norwich, Speaker's Chaplain, Sub-Dean at Westminster Abbey, Dean of Southwark and author
- Nicholas Burgess Farrell (born 1958), journalist
- Patrick Leigh Fermor DSO OBE (1915–2011), author, scholar and soldier
- James Hamilton-Paterson (born 1941), poet and novelist
- John Wesley Harding (born 1965), singer-songwriter and author
- Dyneley Hussey (1893–1972), war poet, journalist and critic
- Alaric Jacob (1909–1995), writer, journalist and war correspondent
- John Lloyd CBE (born 1951), television and radio comedy writer and producer
- Edward Lucie-Smith (1933-2026), writer, poet, art critic and curator
- John Lyly (c1553–1606), playwright, courtier and parliamentarian
- Christopher Marlowe (1565–1593), playwright and poet
- W. Somerset Maugham CH (1874–1965), playwright, novelist and short story writer
- Tristan McConnell, journalist
- Michael Morpurgo OBE FRSL FKC (born 1943), author, poet, playwright and librettist
- Walter Pater (1839–1894), essayist, literary and art critic, fiction writer and humanist
- Anthony Price (1928–2019), author
- Shoo Rayner (born 1956), children's author and illustrator
- Stephanie Sy-Quia (born 1995), writer and novelist
- Edmund de Waal OBE (born 1964), artist, potter and author
- Sir Hugh Walpole CBE (1884–1941), novelist
- Alan Watts (1915–1973), writer and philosopher

== Military ==
- John Day KCB OBE ADC (1947-2024), former Royal Air Force commander and military advisor to BAE Systems
- Patrick Leigh Fermor DSO OBE (1915–2011), author, scholar and soldier
- Arthur Fleming-Sandes VC (1894–1961), British Army major and Victoria Cross recipient during World War I
- Harry Gardner MC (1890–1939), British Army first-class cricketer and officer
- Bernard Montgomery KG GCB DSO PC DL (1887–1976), British Army field marshal
- Peter Scawen Watkinson Roberts VC DSC (1917–1979), Royal Navy Lieutenant Commander and Victoria Cross recipient during World War II
- William Vousden VC CB (1848–1902), British Indian Army major general and Victoria Cross recipient during the Second Anglo-Afghan War

== Music ==
- Stephen Barlow (born 1954), conductor and former Artistic Director of the Buxton Festival
- Simon Carrington (born 1942), conductor, musician, and former founding member of The King's Singers
- Harry Christophers CBE (born 1953), conductor
- John Wesley Harding (born 1965), singer-songwriter and author
- William Lewarne Harris (1929-2013), composer and teacher
- Andrew Marriner (born 1954), former principal clarinettist of the London Symphony Orchestra
- George Miles (1913–1988), organist
- Christopher Seaman (born 1942), conductor
- Stephen Varcoe (born 1949), classical singer

== Politics ==
- Charles Abbott, 1st Baron Tenterden PC SL (1762–1832), barrister and judge
- Natascha Engel (born 1967), former MP for North East Derbyshire
- Catherine Fall, Baroness Fall, political advisor and former Downing Street Chief of Staff under David Cameron
- Tristan Garel-Jones PC (1941–2020), former MP for Watford
- George Gipps (1790–1847), Governor of New South Wales
- Fairfax Luxmoore (1876–1944), barrister and judge who sat as Lord Justice of Appeal
- Anthony Parsons GCMG LVO MC (1922–1996), diplomat, former British ambassador to Iran, and former British Permanent Representative to the UN
- Charles Powell KCMG (born 1941), diplomat, businessman, and foreign policy adviser to Margaret Thatcher
- Jonathan Powell (born 1956), diplomat and former Downing Street Chief of Staff under Tony Blair
- Hugh Robertson KCMG PC DL (born 1962), chairman of the British Olympic Association and the Camelot Group, former MP for Faversham and Mid Kent, Minister of State, and Minister for Sport
- John Sawbridge (1732–1795), politician and Lord Mayor of London 1775
- Patrick Walker KCB (born 1932), former Director General of MI5

== Religion ==
- Gavin Ashenden (born 1954), former Anglican priest and continuing Anglican bishop
- Richard Boys (1785–1867), Anglican clergyman, chaplain on St. Helena, and author
- William Broughton (1788–1853), Anglican Bishop of Australia
- David Edwards OBE (1929–2018), former Dean of Norwich, Speaker's Chaplain, Sub-Dean at Westminster Abbey, Dean of Southwark, and author
- Reginald Glennie (1864–1953), first-class cricketer and clergyman
- Michael Mayne KCVO (1929–2006), former Dean of Westminster
- Howard Mowll (1890–1958), former Anglican Archbishop of Sydney

== Sport ==
- Ronald Binny (1910–1979), first-class cricketer and British Indian Army officer
- Harry Gardner MC (1890–1939), first-class cricketer and British Army officer
- Reginald Glennie (1864–1953), first-class cricketer and clergyman
- David Gower OBE (born 1957), cricket commentator, former cricketer and captain of the England cricket team
- Bob Haines (1906–1965), cricketer
- Frances Houghton MBE (born 1980), Olympic rower and World Champion
- Millie Knight (born 1999), Paralympic skier
- Cecil Paris (1911–1998), first-class cricketer; chairman of the Test and County Cricket Board (1968–1969) and president of the Marylebone Cricket Club (1975)
- Tom Ransley MBE (born 1985), former Olympic rower and World Champion
- Ollie Robinson (born 1993), England cricketer
- Fred Scarlett (born 1975), Olympic rower

== Other ==
- Gregory Blaxland (1778–1853), pioneer settler, explorer, and co-leader of the first crossing of the Blue Mountains
- John Blaxland (1769–1845), pioneer settler and explorer
- Hubert Chesshyre FSA FHS (1940–2020), retired British officer of arms found to have committed child sexual abuse
- Tony Coxon (1938-2012), sociologist
- Myles Jackman, (born 1974/75), lawyer
- Jacquetta Wheeler (born 1981), model
- Peter, Hereditary Prince of Yugoslavia (born 1980)
