= List of people educated at Worksop College =

Worksop College (formerly St Cuthbert's College) is a British co-educational private school for both day and boarding pupils aged 13 to 18, in Worksop. It sits at the northern edge of Sherwood Forest, in Nottinghamshire, England. Founded by Nathaniel Woodard in 1890, the school is a member of the Woodard Corporation and Headmasters' and Headmistresses' Conference, and has a strong Anglo-Catholic tradition.

== Notable Old Worksopians ==
The following are notable former pupils of the college:

- George Able (Mountgarret) - Master of Dulwich College and educationalist.
- Major William Barnsley Allen (Mason) - recipient of the Victoria Cross.
- John Austin - Bishop of Aston (1992–2005).
- Christopher Awdry (Mountgarret) - Children's author famous for writing some of the volumes in The Railway Series of books featuring Thomas the Tank Engine
- Richard Bacon (Mason) - broadcaster.
- Phil Boulton - professional rugby union player.
- Jack Buckner (Talbot) - European 5000m champion 1986, Commonwealth Silver Medallist 1986, World Championship Bronze Medallist 1987 and double Olympian (Seoul 1988 and Barcelona 1992).
- Tom Buckner (Talbot) - AAA steeplechase champion and Olympian (Barcelona 1992).
- Peter Carmichael - fighter pilot.
- Andy Carter - Conservative MP for Warrington South.
- Jonathan Chaffey - Anglican priest and former Chaplain-in-Chief of the Royal Air Force
- Chris Colton - orthopaedic surgeon
- Simon Corlett (Portland) - former president of the Irish Cricket Board.
- Neil Dickson (School House) - actor
- Adam Dixon (Shirley) - former Great Britain and England field hockey captain and Olympian
- Vivian Hollowday (School House & Shirley) - the first member of the RAF to be awarded the George Cross.
- Brett Hutton - Nottinghamshire cricketer
- Nim Hall (Shirley) - England fly half and captain 1947–1955.
- Richard Kettleborough (Portland) - international cricket umpire
- Matthew Lambley (Shirley) - Great Britain hammer thrower.
- Andy McKay (Talbot) - Club promoter and co-founder of Manumission.
- Mike McKay (Talbot) - Club promoter and co-founder of Manumission.
- Samit Patel (Talbot) - Nottinghamshire and England cricketer.
- Judge James Pickles (Mountgarret) - Judge, tabloid columnist and occasional TV personality.
- Ivor Roberts-Jones (Pelham) - sculptor who produced amongst other works the statue of Winston Churchill which currently stands in Parliament Square, London.
- Joe Root (Portland) - Yorkshire and England cricketer.
- Phil Sharpe (Shirley) - England cricketer and Wisden Cricketer of the year 1966.
- Rupert Sheldrake (Pelham) - scientist, author and television personality.
- Mark Simmonds (Portland) - Former Conservative Member of Parliament for Boston and Skegness.
- Tom Sorsby (Shirley) - current member of the England and Great Britain field hockey team.
- Bill Sykes - college chaplain and author.
- Chad Varah (Fleur de Lys) - Founder of The Samaritans.
- Marcus Vere (Pelham) - musician, composer and keyboard player in the 1980s group Living In A Box.
- Richard Winsor (Pelham) - actor and dancer
- Hugh Walters - actor
- Oliver Willars (Pelham) - former member of the Great Britain and England field hockey teams.
- Pete Wilcox - Bishop of Sheffield
