= Richard Boys (priest) =

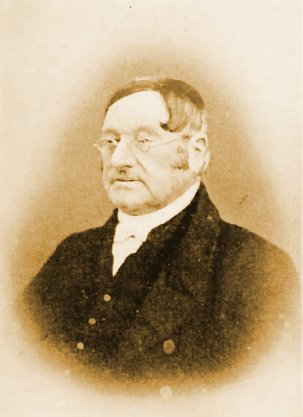
- Rev. Richard Boys
- Born: 1785; Kent, England
- Died: 1867 (aged 81–82); Loose, Kent
- Education: The King's School, Canterbury; Corpus Christi College, Cambridge
- Occupation: Clergyman
- Title: Reverend
- Parent(s): John Boys, Mary Harvey

Reverend Richard Boys MA (23 May 1783 - 13 February 1866) was a Church of England clergyman and author, most notable for his tenure as Chaplain on St. Helena at the time of Napoleon Bonaparte's exile there. A controversial figure during his time there, he also played a part in the mystery surrounding Napoleon's death mask.

== Early life ==
Richard Boys was born in 1783, the fourth son of John Boys and Mary (née Harvey). He was educated at The King's School, Canterbury, afterward joining the Royal Engineers but later renewed his studies, going on to get an MA at Corpus Christi College, Cambridge. He was ordained deacon in 1807 and priest in 1808. He was appointed chaplain to the East India Company and made junior chaplain at St. Helena in 1811.

== St. Helena ==
=== Chaplaincy ===
The forthright and uncompromising Boys quickly gained notoriety on the island. He had a fractious relationship with the Senior Chaplain, the Rev. Samuel Jones, to the point that in January 1815 the St. Helena council minutes record an unspecified disagreement which had arisen between the two that was “productive of disgraceful effects” such as the council felt moved to order them to “abstain from further personal controversy, or circulation of written or printed letters referring to it on pain of suspension."

After the compulsory retirement of Jones later in 1815, Boys was chosen to succeed him, also inheriting his responsibilities as Master of the Upper School on the island. The promotion did little to rein in the chaplain's strident nature as further council records attest. On 30 March 1817 the Council asked Mr Boys for an explanation of his conduct in refusing to take into the church a coffin for burial. He countered by claiming that the funeral attendees were pagans who were disrespecting the church. In 1821 the minutes recall an incident when Boys publicly accused a shopkeeper of being a liar and a spy, calling after him in the street: "Blenkens, when is the green bag to be given out?" ("green bag" at the time being a term describing a bag containing the fabricated evidence of paid informers). On this occasion Boys received an official reprimand.

Boys did not restrict his eccentric behaviour to St. Helena. Chaplin recounts another occasion when, on a visit to Rio de Janeiro accompanying a Mr Thornton, a British minister, Thornton was obliged to send Boys away on account of "his indecent behaviour when a Catholic procession was passing by."

Almost inevitably, Boys came into conflict with the island's Governor Sir Hudson Lowe. Boys took umbrage to the behaviour of Rear admiral Plampin, one of Lowe's most erstwhile supporters, who was living "in sin" with a lady who was not his wife. Boys' barely disguised diatribes against the officer during his sermons caused Plampin severe embarrassment and he appealed to Lowe for action against Boys. Lowe's correspondence to Britain frequently described his frustration at being unable to act given the chaplain's standing among the residents of the island and the uproar the clergyman would create if banished back to the UK.

Boys further aggravated the island's military by his insistence on completing the record of the births of illegitimate children of slave women with the names of the fathers in bold characters, including the titles and positions of the sires, some of whom were the highest and most trusted of Lowe's lieutenants.

On the eve of Lowe's departure from the island and return to the United Kingdom, Boys used his sermon as an opportunity to take a final shot at the sinfulness of the military hierarchy on the island. The vehemance of the sermon prompted Lowe to lodge an official complaint with the island council. Defiant as ever, Boys declined to provide the council with a copy of the sermon and in the absence of further evidence they were unable to act.

=== Boys and Napoleon ===
Richard Boys' granddaughter Lilian Boys-Behrens' 1926 book Under Thirty-Seven Kings asserts that Rev. Boys was the first person to whom Napoleon spoke upon his arrival in St. Helena, although this is disputed by other contemporary accounts which report that the arrival occurred in silence with no exchanges between Napoleon and the waiting crowd and certainly no explicit mention of Rev. Mr. Boys.

It has been claimed that Boys had one meeting with Napoleon though there is no documentary evidence of it having taken place. When Cipriani, Napoleon's major-domo died, Boys and his junior chaplain buried the man, a Catholic, according to the rites of the Protestant Church. Napoleon was astonished when he heard of it, and said a priest would not have done so much for a Protestant. As a token of appreciation of their conduct Napoleon desired to give the two chaplains a present. A snuffbox was purchased in Jamestown and offered to Boys, but was refused owing to the severe penalties attached to any acceptance of gifts from the exile.

It has also been claimed that a chair from Napoleon's house at Longwood, was bought by Boys at an auction after Napoleon's death in 1821. This chair was brought back by Boys when he returned to England and was latterly bequeathed to Maidstone Museum & Art Gallery.

Boys also had a role in the mystery and controversy surrounding Napoleon's death mask. As was the custom for major leaders of the time, a death mask impression of Napoleon's face was taken shortly after his demise. Right from the start there were conflicting reports of who took the impression and when, and in whose possession it then came to be. Soon there were various and hugely differing masks appearing around Europe all purporting to be the genuine article. While the main focus of the debate ranged around whether the original had been taken by Dr Burton or Dr Antommarchi, both of whom had been physicians attending to Napoleon at the time of his death, another mask appeared in the possession of Dr J. O. Sankey, a grandson of Boys. This mask (commonly known as the Sankey mask), purported to have been taken by Joseph William Buridge, an English artist who had made a famous sketch of Napoleon on his deathbed. The providence of this item was supported by a written testimony from Boys himself.

This caused a great deal of consternation as although the story of Buridge making a mask didn't tally with any other accounts, Boys was universally accepted to have been an honest individual. In his 1915 book The Story of Napoleon's Death Mask, Napoleon iconologist G. L. de St. Watson argued the case for the Sankey mask, suggesting that it was a copy made by Buridge of Burton's original whilst at Longwood without Burton's knowledge. Today, however, the Sankey mask has been largely dismissed as unlikely to be authentic.

Boys appears as a character in Brooks Hansen's The Monsters of St. Helena (2003), a fictionalised account of Napoleon's final years on St. Helena.

== Post St. Helena ==
Boys continued in charge in St. Helena until 1830, when he retired on a pension. On returning to England he held several parishes, initially at All Saints' Church, Tudeley (1830-1832), and finally settling at Loose, in Kent, in 1854. He published two works, The Elements of Christian Knowledge: Or a Compendium of the Christian Religion, in the Form of a Catechism (1838), and Primitive Obliquities; Or, a Review of the Epistles of the New Testament, in Reference to the Prevailing Offences in the Church. He died in 1866, aged 82, and is buried in Loose churchyard.
