= Harry Gardner (cricketer) =

English cricketer and British Army officer (1890–1939)

Personal information
- Full name: Harry Gardner
- Born: 12 June 1890; City of London, England
- Died: 12 February 1939 (aged 48); East Grinstead, Sussex, England
- Batting: Unknown

Career statistics
Competition	First-class
Matches	2
Runs scored	42
Batting average	10.50
100s/50s	–/–
Top score	17
Catches/stumpings	1/–
- Source: Cricinfo, 13 April 2019

Harry Gardner MC (12 June 1890 – 12 February 1939) was an English first-class cricketer and British Army officer. Gardner served in the Royal Artillery for over twenty years, during which he was decorated with the Military Cross, Croix de Guerre and the Order of the Nile. He also played first-class cricket for the British Army cricket team.

== Life and military career ==
Gardner was born at the City of London and was educated at The King's School, Canterbury. From there he attended the Royal Military Academy, Woolwich, graduating in July 1910 as a second lieutenant in the Royal Artillery. He was promoted to the rank of lieutenant in July 1913. Gardner made two appearances in first-class cricket for the British Army cricket team in June 1914, against Cambridge University at Fenner's and the Royal Navy at Lord's. He scored 42 runs in his two first-class matches, with a high score of 17.

He served in the First World War, during which he was promoted to the temporary rank of captain in July 1915. He relinquished a temporary appointment to brigade major–captain in March 1919. In June of the same year, he was awarded the Military Cross and decorated with the Croix de Guerre by France. He was granted the Order of the Nile (fourth class) in May 1922, for operations against the Nuer leader Garluark in the Upper Nile. Having been seconded to the Royal Military College of Science, Gardner was restored to the Royal Artillery in April 1928. He was promoted to the rank of major in December 1928. He retired from active service in March 1931. Gardner died at East Grinstead in February 1939.
