= Lionel Bostock =

English cricketer and British Army officer (1888–1962)

Personal information
- Full name: Lionel Carrington Bostock
- Born: 13 February 1888; Castries, Saint Lucia
- Died: 30 January 1962 (aged 73); Ifield, Sussex, England
- Batting: Right-handed
- Bowling: Right-arm medium

Career statistics
Competition	First-class
Matches	1
Runs scored	5
Batting average	5.00
100s/50s	–/–
Top score	3
Balls bowled	120
Wickets	2
Bowling average	29.00
5 wickets in innings	–
10 wickets in match	–
Best bowling	2/58
Catches/stumpings	1/–
- Source: Cricinfo, 9 January 2019

Lionel Carrington Bostock OBE MC (13 February 1888 – 30 January 1962) was an English first-class cricketer and British Army officer. He served with the Manchester Regiment and during the First World War was also seconded to the West African Frontier Force and the British Indian Army. After the war Bostock was seconded to the Egyptian Army and became commander of the Equatorial Corps of the Sudan Defence Force. In 1927–28 he led a punitive expedition against a rebellion of the Nuer people and successfully defeated a force led by Prophet Garluark. Bostock retired in 1933 but was recalled to service during the Second World War.

== Early life ==
Bostock was born at Castries, Saint Lucia, on 13 February 1888 the son of John Henry Bostock, a civil engineer, and Caroline Sophia (née Dewé). He was educated in England at Windlesham House School, before going up to Marlborough College. Bostock played rugby union for Clifton in 1907–1908. After completing his studies at Marlborough he attended the Royal Military College, Sandhurst, and after graduating entered the Manchester Regiment. On 25 May 1912, Bostock was promoted to lieutenant.

During the early part of the First World War Bostock was seconded from his regiment to the 1st Battalion of the Nigeria Regiment of the West African Frontier Force. He received promotion to the rank of captain on 10 June 1915 and returned to the Manchester Regiment on 29 July 1915. Bostock served temporarily as second-in-command of one of the regiment's battalions from 31 August to 2 September 1916 and was granted the acting rank of major whilst he carried out this role. On 11 January 1917 he was attached to an Indian Army headquarters unit as a staff captain and on 30 December 1918 was promoted to brigade major.

== Egyptian service ==
On 15 March 1919 Bostock was seconded for service with the Egyptian Army (at that time Egypt, including Sudan, was a British protectorate) and on 3 June received the Military Cross for service on operations in that country. Bostock was in England in 1925 when he made his sole first-class cricket appearance for the British Army cricket team against Cambridge University at Fenner's. He scored 5 runs during the match, as well as taking the wickets of Hamer Bagnall and Thomas Tweed in Cambridge's first-innings.

Bostock afterwards returned to Egypt where he served as commander of the Equatorial Corps of the Sudan Defence Force (Sudan was then under a joint Anglo-Egyptian condominium). During this time the Nuer people of southern Sudan opposed British rule and remained active despite several British punitive expeditions. Led by Prophet Garluark, who formerly served the British as a regional ruler, an open revolt erupted in the Western Nuer territories in December 1927 in which the British district commissioner and 18 of his men were killed. A simultaneous uprising occurred by the Nuer of the Sobat River region.

The British responded by launching two expeditions, one to the Sobat River under Captain JR Chidlaw-Robert and one against Garluark under Bostock. Bostock's base of operations was at Shambe and his political officer was Captain HF Kidd, district commissioner for Yirrol. Bostock divided his force into several independent columns that successfully established a cordon around Garluark's Nuer and allowed their destruction largely by aerial attack. The operation was completed by 7 February 1928 and resulted in Garluark's capture and imprisonment at Malakal. In recognition of his service in Sudan Bostock was appointed an Officer of the Order of the British Empire on 3 June 1929. Garluark was restored to his former position as regional ruler in 1935.

== Later career ==
On 6 March 1931, Bostock was promoted to the rank of lieutenant-colonel and the next year was posted to the West Indies. He retired from the army on 6 March 1933. In April 1937 Bostock, who was then residing at the Sports Club in St James's Square, was declared bankrupt but the order was rescinded by June of that year.

Following the outbreak of the Second World War Bostock was recalled to the army and chose to serve in the reduced rank of major. On 9 March 1942 he was restored to the rank of lieutenant-colonel. Bostock reached the age limit for service in the reserves on 13 February 1943 and resumed his retirement. He died in Ifield, West Sussex on 30 January 1962.
