= William Glennie =

- Born: 1761; Drumoak, Aberdeenshire, Scotland
- Died: 7 January 1828 (aged 66–67); Sandgate, Kent, England
- Relatives: John Glennie (grandson)

William Glennie (1761 – 7 January 1828) was a teacher to Lord Byron and father to a number of Australian pioneers.

== Early life ==
He was born, probably in March or April 1761 in Drumoak, Aberdeenshire, the son of John Glennie and Jean Mitchell. He was baptised at Dalmaik Kirk (Drumoak-Durris' Church) on the 7th of April 1761. He married Mary Gardiner on the 26th of June 1794 at St. Mary Magdalene Church in Richmond, Surrey. He and Gardiner had a large family of twelve, four of whom became Australian Pioneers (James, Henry, Alfred and Benjamin). He died in 1828 in Sandgate, Kent.

== Career ==
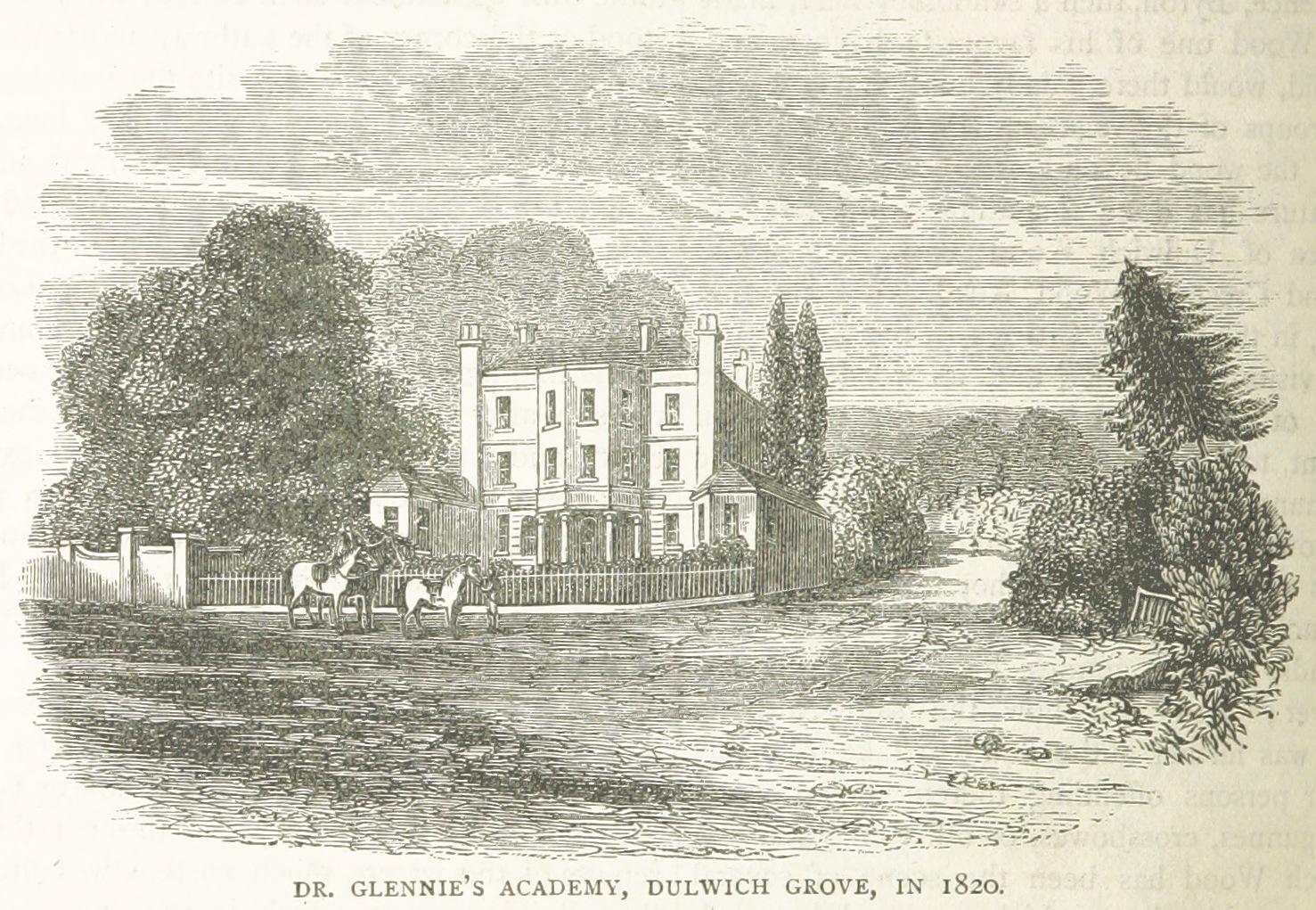
Dr. Glennie's Academy, Dulwich Grove, in 1820

He was the teacher to Byron from August 1799 to April 1801, at his 'academy' in Dulwich Grove. The academy had originally been a Tavern called The Green Man, and had been converted by 1815. He was also a friend of the poet Thomas Campbell.
