= St. Louis Mercantile Library =

Library in Missouri, United States

Coordinates: 38.710200°N 90.311055°W

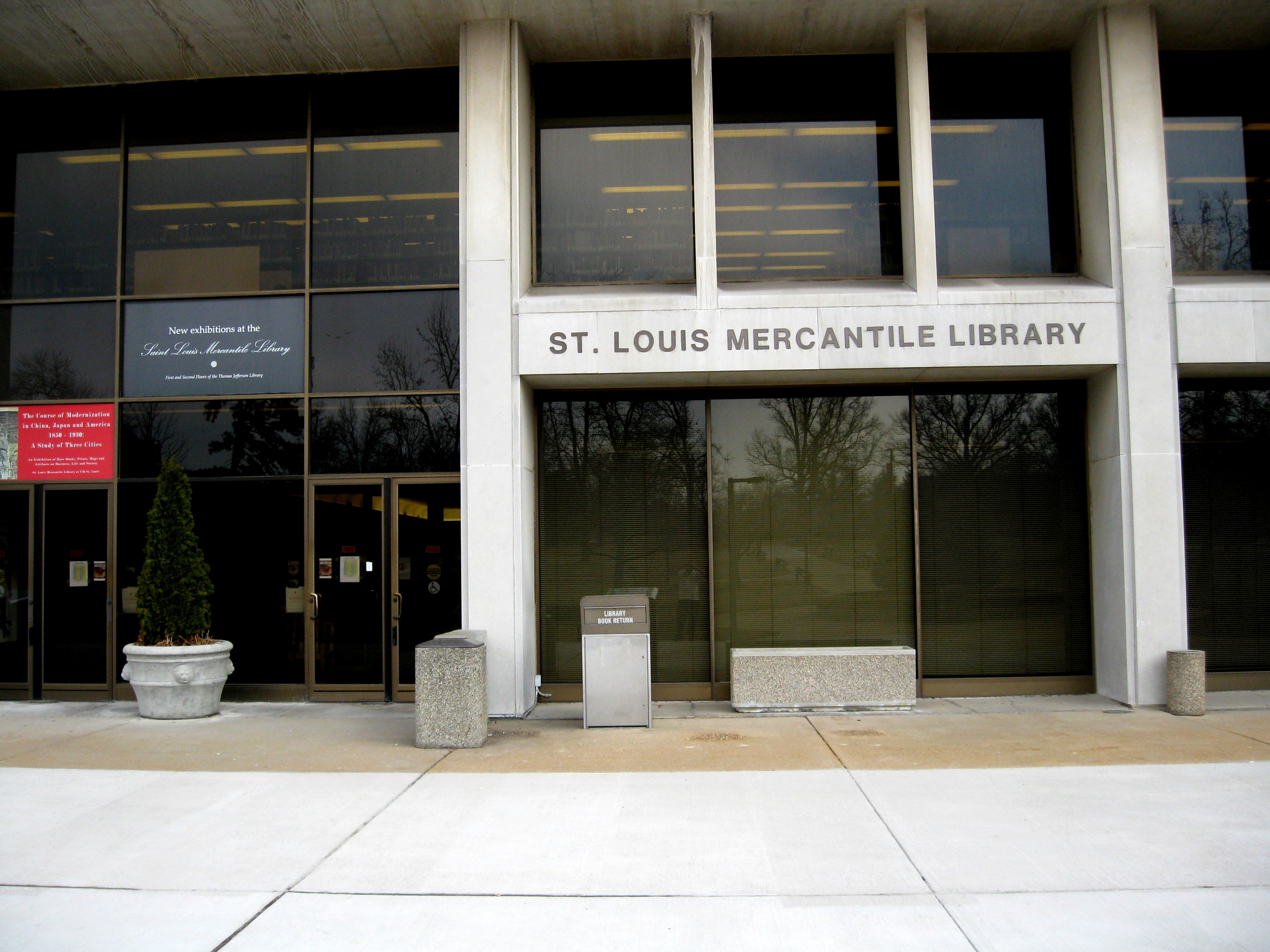
- Current home of the library on the UMSL Campus
- Location: United States of America
- Type: Special collections
- Scope: Americana
- Established: 1846
- Branch of: Thomas Jefferson Library

Collection
- Items collected: History of rail transport; Inland waterways of the United States; Territorial evolution of the United States; Visual art of the United States
- Size: Over 250,000 books and 400 archival collections

Other information
- Director: John N. Hoover
- Public transit access: MetroBus; Red; At UMSL-North station
- Website: http://www.umsl.edu/mercantile/

The St. Louis Mercantile Library, founded in 1846 in downtown St. Louis, Missouri, was originally established as a membership library, and is the oldest extant library west of the Mississippi River. Since 1998 the library has been housed at the University of Missouri-St. Louis as a Special Collections library within the Thomas Jefferson Library. The majority of library materials can be assigned to one of four categories: the General (Core) Collection, the John W. Barriger Railroad Library, the Herman T. Pott National Inland Waterways Library, or the Art Museum. The collections of the St. Louis Mercantile Library have been named a City Landmark by the city of St. Louis, Mo., due to the cultural significance of the library.

== History ==
=== Establishment and development ===
In December 1845 a group of civic leaders and philanthropists joined to establish a membership library with the intent of creating a place "where young men could pass their evenings agreeably and profitably, and thus be protected from the temptations to folly that ever beset unguarded youth in large towns." The library officially opened on April 19, 1846, and became chartered by the State of Missouri that year. At the time, public libraries were not a standard institution. The St. Louis Mercantile Library, with a reading room, meeting rooms, book stacks, and the largest auditorium in the city, became a primary hub of cultural and intellectual interchange in the city in the years preceding commonplace public and academic libraries.

James E. Yeatman was the first president. Yeatman would go on to be one of the founders of the Mercantile Bank as well as Washington University in St. Louis. By 1847 it had 1,600 volumes and 283 subscribing members. In 1851 it merged with the St. Louis Lyceum. The St. Louis Symphony played its first concerts in the library. A series of lectures were held in the auditorium, with noted speakers including Mark Twain, Carl Schurz, Ralph Waldo Emerson and Oscar Wilde.

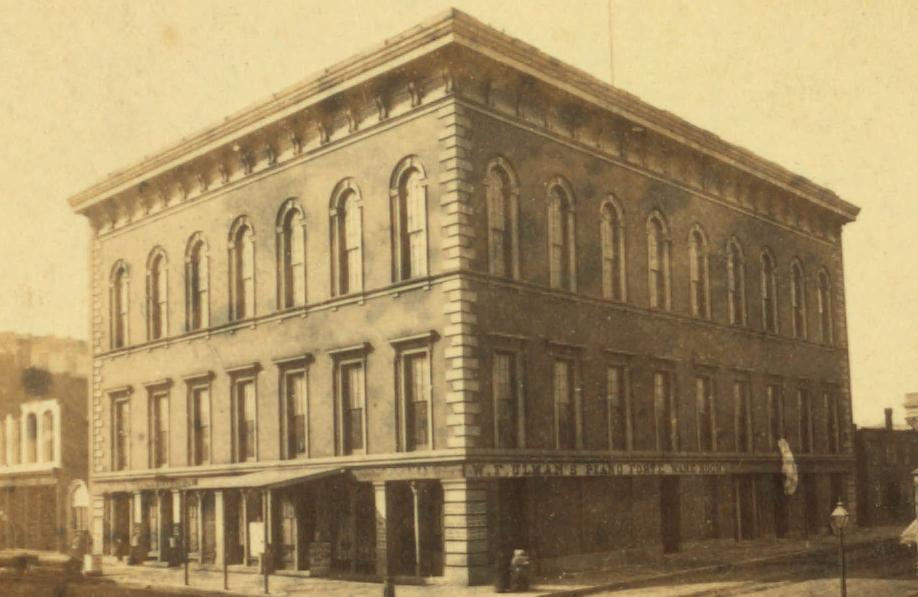
Mercantile Library Hall, ca. 1870

In 1854 the library moved to a new building at 510 Locust Street, on the corner of Broadway and Locust streets. The structure included the 2,000 seat Grand Hall, the largest auditorium in the city at the time. The first session of the Missouri Constitutional Convention in 1861 met in the library voting to stay in the Union at the beginning of the American Civil War. Another constitutional convention in 1865 abolished slavery.

In 1884 Robert S. Brookings began a campaign to build a new fireproof building. The older building was demolished in 1887 and a new cornerstone was laid by Henry Shaw (botanist). In 1889 the new six-story structure was dedicated on the same site. The new structure had no lecture hall, but did include an elevator. The library replaced candles in the stacks with electricity for the first time in 1901. Notable library programs included a telephone service and Book Delivery Service using a Ford Model T established in 1915. The Library received its designated status as a City Landmark in 1973.

=== History of the collection ===
With the opening of the free St. Louis Public Library in 1893, the Mercantile Library's mission shifted from serving as the primary modern library of the city to focus on its major historic collections of books, papers, and art works. The Art Museum has actively collected paintings, drawings, sculpture, and folk art of America since its foundation, tracing back to an early loan from noted St. Louis artist Charles Deas.

The Mercantile Library historically collected materials to reflect the industrial history of St. Louis and the surrounding region. In this spirit, a dedicated railroad collection was established in 1983, named after John W. Barriger III, an American railroad executive whose large personal library of books, corporate papers, and photographs formed the core of the railroad holdings. In 1985, the library established a formal waterways collection named after Herman T. Pott, a prominent river industry executive.

The newspaper photo morgue and clipping files of the St. Louis Globe-Democrat, established in 1854, moved to the library.

== The library today ==
The library's historic downtown location and status as an independent institution came under internal review in 1994, when the Board of Direction began a long-range self-study to determine how to make the library's collections more accessible to modern scholars. 1996 marked the 150th Anniversary of the St. Louis Mercantile Library Association, and also became the year the Board voted to approve an affiliation with the University of Missouri-St. Louis. This several-year long process culminated in 1998, when the Mercantile Library moved to its current location in the Thomas Jefferson Library building on the campus of the University of Missouri-St. Louis and rededicated itself as its current status of a special collections library within the university.

The library still maintains its membership model, but the majority of the collections remain open to the public for research purposes through a combination of open stacks, the archival Reading Room research program and the UMSL Digital Library. Instead of allowing access to the library, membership now provides additional borrowing privileges, access to non-public events, invitations to speaker series, and private tours.

The library operates under an open-storage solution for much of its collection, meaning that a large percentage of the collections are on display throughout the library at any given time. The library also offers free physical art and history exhibits of materials from its collections as well as online exhibits.

== Highlights of the collections ==
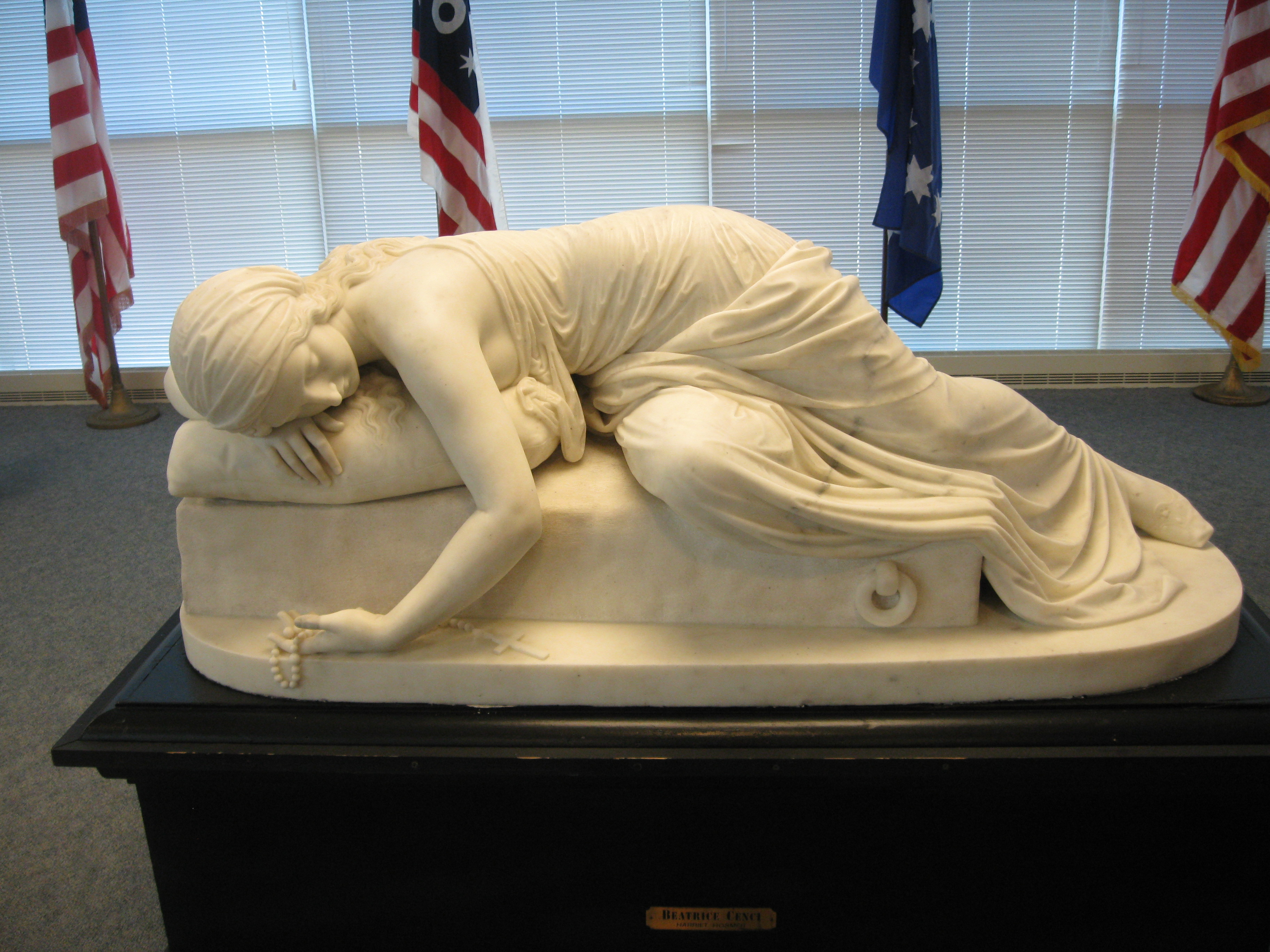
Statue of Beatrice Cenci (1857)

Notable among the library's collections:

- John W. Barriger III National Railroad Library - over 45,000 volumes of railroad documents and photographs, focusing strongly on railway economics, finance, corporate history, management practice, regulatory history, mergers, labor relations, operations, and engineering.
- Herman T. Pott National Inland Waterways Library - River documents, artifacts and artwork
- Clippings and photo morgue of the St. Louis Globe-Democrat (over 10 million documents), including a searchable subject and name database
- Official file copies of the St. Louis Post-Dispatch
- Photo and film archives of Trans World Airlines
- Signed and complete first edition double elephant folio of John James Audubon's Birds of America
- The authenticated journal of Auguste Chouteau describing the founding of St. Louis
- Harriet Hosmer's marble sculpture, Beatrice Cenci commissioned for the library by an anonymous donor(1857)
- Four Portraits of Winnebago chiefs by Charles Deas
- Death mask of Napoleon Bonaparte cast in plaster from the original by Francesco Antommarchi
