= Thomas Tweed =

Thomas Tweed may refer to:

- Thomas Tweed (politician), merchant and political figure in the Northwest Territories, Canada.
- Thomas F. Tweed, British soldier, novelist and political adviser
- Thomas Tweed (cricketer), Sri Lankan cricketer
