= Tristan McConnell =

British journalist

Tristan McConnell is a writer and foreign correspondent based in Kenya. He has been a correspondent for The Times, The Economist, Monocle, GlobalPost and Agence France-Presse.

== Early life ==
McConnell attended The King's School, Canterbury, before studying social anthropology at Magdalene College, Cambridge.

== Career ==
McConnell has lived and worked in Africa since 2004.

He has reported from dozens of countries, including Somalia, Democratic Republic of Congo, South Sudan, Mali, and Uganda writing both long-form and news stories. In 2016, he won awards from the Overseas Press Club of America, the Prix Bayeux for War Correspondents, and the Society for Features Journalism for his long-form account of a terrorist attack on a Nairobi shopping mall.

He has been a finalist for numerous Kurt Schork awards, including in 2007, 2014 and 2015, and has been short-listed for others.

His articles and essays have appeared in The New Yorker, Harper's Magazine, GQ, Columbia Journalism Review, New York, and Foreign Policy.
