= Bill Sykes (priest) =

The Reverend Bill Sykes
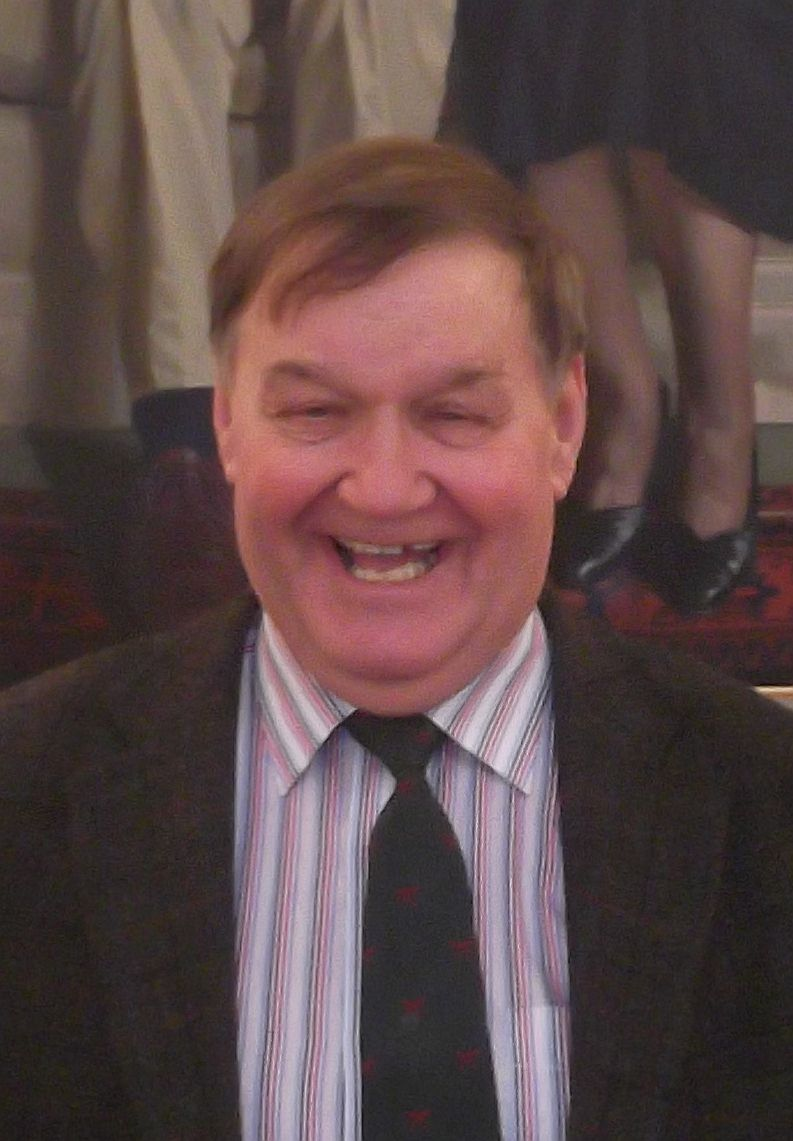
- The Revd Bill Sykes in the Butler Room at University College, Oxford, on 9 November 2013
- Born: William George David Sykes; 1939; Yorkshire, England
- Died: 17 January 2015 (aged 75); John Radcliffe Hospital, Oxford, England
- Education: Worksop College; Balliol College, Oxford; Wycliffe Hall, Oxford
- Occupation: College chaplain
- Years active: 1965–2005
- Religion: Christian
- Church: Anglican
- Ordained: 1965
- Writings: Visions of Faith: An Anthology of Reflections
- Offices held: Canon, Bradford Cathedral; Chaplain, University College London; Chaplain and Fellow, University College, Oxford
- Title: Revd
- Website: www.univ.ox.ac.uk/Billsykes

William George David Sykes (1939 – 17 January 2015) was an English college fellow, Anglican priest, and book author.

== Biography ==
Bill Sykes was born in Yorkshire, England. He attended school at Worksop College in Worksop, Nottinghamshire. Sykes then undertook National Service, joining the Gurkhas. He then studied for a PPE degree at Balliol College, Oxford. Upon finishing his degree and following on from his experience with the Gurkhas, Sykes joined an expedition to Nepal organized by Oxford University, acting as an interpreter. After returning from the expedition, Sykes trained for ordination at Wycliffe Hall in North Oxford.

In 1965, Sykes was appointed as a canon at Bradford Cathedral in Yorkshire. In 1969, he became the chaplain at University College London. In 1978, he moved to University College, Oxford as a fellow and chaplain, remaining there until his retirement in 2005. Subsequently, he was elected as an Emeritus Fellow of the college.

Sykes wrote books and reflective thoughts on religious ideas, most notably Visions of Faith: An Anthology of Reflections. His portrait was painted by the artist Daphne Todd.

Bill Sykes died on 17 January 2015 at the John Radcliffe Hospital in Oxford, England, aged 75. A memorial service with over 500 attendees was held in the University Church, Oxford.
