= Thomas Jefferson Library =

University of Missouri–St. Louis main library

Coordinates: 38°42′37″N 90°18′40″W

- Location: St. Louis, Missouri, US
- Established: 1968

Other information
- Parent organization: University of Missouri–St. Louis
- Website: www.umsl.edu/library/index.html

The Thomas Jefferson Library is the main library for the University of Missouri–St. Louis, the largest public university in the St. Louis Metropolitan Area.

== History ==
In 1963 the Normandy Residence Center, a two-year junior college, officially became the institution now known as the University of Missouri–St. Louis. The original University library was located in a small section of what had previously been the clubhouse of Bellerive Country Club. It contained a meager 3,800 volumes under the stewardship of a single professional librarian. By 2005 the Libraries of the university housed more than one million volumes, including a Federal Depository Library, a computerized Library Research Commons, and the St. Louis Mercantile Library at the University of Missouri–St. Louis.

The Thomas Jefferson Library was one of the first of three new buildings constructed on the campus. It opened in 1968 under the leadership of its first Library Director, Susan Freegard. Within its 5 stories, the Library was designed to house more than 240,000 volumes and allow seating for 1,000 students. The original "TJ Library" entrance also sported a swimming pool and basketball court, which have since been removed.

By the 1980s the growing library collections began to displace staff and study areas. $6.1 million in funding for expansion was provided by the State of Missouri, McDonnell Douglas, Emerson Electric, and Anheuser-Busch, each being local St. Louis corporations. On June 13, 1990, the new McDonnell Douglas, Emerson Electric, Anheuser-Busch Wing of the Thomas Jefferson Library was dedicated. The glass pyramid on the west side of the building is reminiscent of the Louvre Museum Pyramid in Paris.

In 1996 the 1,250 members of the Mercantile Library voted for and approved its move from downtown St. Louis to the Thomas Jefferson Library building. On October 2, 1998, the St. Louis Mercantile Library at the University of Missouri–St. Louis was formally rededicated. It resides on the first two floors of the Thomas Jefferson Library building beneath its signature glass pyramid.

== Resources and holdings ==
As of 2006-2007:

- 1,051,952 book volumes
- 1,011,867 book titles
- 3,614 periodical subscriptions
- 1,152 videos
- 109 journals

=== Special collections ===
- Colonial Latin American History
- Mercantile
- US Document Depository
- Utopian Literature and Science Fiction
