= Simon Corlett =

Irish cricketer (born 1950)

Cricket information
- Batting: Right-handed
- Bowling: Right-arm fast-medium

Career statistics
Competition	First-class	List A
Matches	33	7
Runs scored	697	26
Batting average	18.83	6.50
100s/50s	0/3	0/0
Top score	60	11
Balls bowled	5,253	462
Wickets	79	11
Bowling average	29.50	28.36
5 wickets in innings	4	0
10 wickets in match	0	0
Best bowling	7/82	3/43
Catches/stumpings	26/–	2/–
- Source: CricketArchive, 30 December 2021

Simon Charles Corlett (born 18 January 1950) is a former Irish cricketer. Corlett attended Worksop College, a public school in North Nottinghamshire, and Exeter College, Oxford. A right-handed batsman and right-arm fast-medium bowler with a right arm off spin, he made his debut for Ireland in a match against the Netherlands in June 1974, and went on to play for Ireland on 73 occasions, his last match coming in August 1987 against Wales.

Of his matches for Ireland, fifteen had first-class status and seven had List A status. Of the first-class matches he played for Ireland, all but one was against Scotland, the other coming against Sri Lanka.

Prior to his international career for Ireland, he played for Oxford University, playing 18 first-class matches for them.

He later served as president of the Irish Cricket Union in 2003.
