= Fred Shirley =

English Anglican priest (1890–1967)

Revd Canon Frederick Joseph John Shirley, D.D., Ph.D., LL.B. (1890–1967) was an Anglican priest as well as being the headmaster of The King's School, Canterbury, a fee paying school, from 1935 to 1962.

He was educated St Edmund Hall, Oxford, and London. He married his wife in 1926 and their daughter became the first and, at the time, the only girl in the school.

When Shirley took over the Headmastership of the King's School, Canterbury, in 1935, bankruptcy was close: the school had debts of £40,000 - £60,000 and was making an annual loss of £6,000. He was at the same time appointed a Residentiary Canon of Canterbury Cathedral in whose precincts the School is situated.

When Shirley was appointed, he had been headmaster of Worksop College for fourteen years. Controversially, on being appointed to King's, he persuaded the parents of about 30 Worksop boys to send them with him to Canterbury. This move is sometimes called the "rape of Worksop" and it resulted in Shirley's suspension from the Headmasters' Conference.

Shirley was known to the boys as "Fred" and his normal form of address to them was "m'dear". One boy kept cigarettes in strictest secrecy in the breast pocket of his jacket. Shirley came up to him one day. "Keep 'em there, do you?" he murmured, tapping his breast pocket.

In 1936, Shirley persuaded the writer Somerset Maugham to visit and eventually to be a benefactor to the school. Maugham had savaged the school in Of Human Bondage. Shirley persuaded him that all schools of the 1880s had been more or less as barbaric. Maugham's ashes are buried in the Cathedral Precincts.

Shirley manoeuvred against Dr Hewlett Johnson, the "Red Dean" who was ex-officio the Chairman of Governors. When the Dean put up a huge blue and white banner across the front of the Deanery which read "Christians Ban Nuclear Weapons", some of the boys by way of ripost, put up a banner on one of the school's buildings which read, "King's Ban Communists".

Fred had his detractors. However, to those who attracted his attention he was the epitome of kindness including ensuring that the fees of pupils whose fee paying parent or guardian died were met by the school. During the 1950s Kings achieved between a regular 18-20 Oxbridge Scholarships and Exhibitions. Most of his pupils considered him a leader of men.

With public examinations being set earlier and earlier, in 1952 Shirley founded King's Week as a means of keeping the school together. It is a remarkable festival of music, drama, exhibitions and other fringe activities, which is still an annual event.

Following Shirley's retirement in 1962, the school's Great Hall (which he had built) was renamed the Shirley Hall by Peter Newell, his successor as Headmaster. The building of the Great Hall was Fred's inspiration. There was no money. All of the pupils in the 1950s were required to sell a "brick" to parents and friends. They did. It was opened by Queen Elizabeth The Queen Mother. To the impertinent, it was known as "Fred's Shed".

Among his pupils were the former minister Tristan Garel-Jones and Margaret Thatcher’s adviser, Sir Charles Powell.

== Sources ==
- Thomas Hinde, Imps of Promise: A History of the King's School, Canterbury (London: James and James, 1990)
- Robin Pittman, ed., Fred Remembered: Recollections of John Shirley (Great Glemham, Saxmundham, 1997)
- David L. Edwards, F. J. Shirley: An Extraordinary Headmaster (London: SPCK, 1969)
