= The Last Moments of Napoleon =

1925 book by Francesco Antommarchi

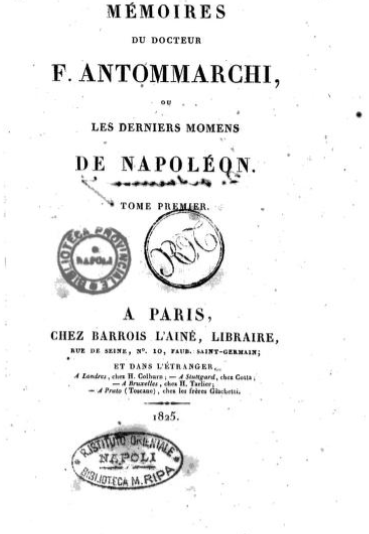
- Author: Francesco Antommarchi
- Original title: Mémoires du docteur F. Antommarchi, ou Les derniers momens de Napoléon
- Language: French
- Genre: Memoir
- Publisher: Barrois l'aîné
- Publication date: 1825
- Publication place: France

The Last Moments of Napoleon is a book by Francesco Antommarchi, Napoleon I's physician.

== Publishing History ==
The two-volume Mémoires du docteur F. Antommarchi, ou Les derniers momens de Napoléon was published in 1825 in Paris by Barrois l'aîné.
