= John Glennie =

English clergyman, educationalist, and cricketer

- Born: John David Glennie; 18 April 1825; Cheriton, Kent
- Died: 7 January 1903 (aged 77); Croxton, Staffordshire
- Burial place: St. Paul's Church, Croxton
- Education: King's School, Canterbury; Christ's College, Cambridge
- Spouse: Frances Finch (m. 1859)

John David Glennie (18 April 1825 – 7 January 1903) was an English clergyman and educationalist who played a single first-class cricket match for Cambridge University in 1848. He was born in April 1825 to John David Glennie and wife Anna Maria Woodyear.

Educated at King's School, Canterbury and Christ's College, Cambridge, Glennie made little impact in his solitary first-class cricket match, which came against a team of Kent amateurs: he scored one run in his two innings and failed to take a wicket. There are no records of him appearing in any other cricket matches, first-class or non-first-class.

Glennie was ordained as a Church of England clergyman after leaving Cambridge, and was a church inspector of schools for some years, later recording his experiences in a book. From 1869 to his death in 1903 he was the vicar of Croxton, Staffordshire. His son, Reginald, was also a first-class cricketer and clergyman.

Glennie died in January 1903 aged 77 at Croxton.
