= Reginald Glennie =

English cricketer

Personal information
- Full name: Reginald Gerard Glennie
- Born: 11 November 1864; Blore, Staffordshire, England
- Died: 24 October 1953 (aged 88); Worcester, Worcestershire, England
- Batting: Unknown
- Relatives: John Glennie (father)

Domestic team information
- Years: Team
- 1886: Oxford University

Career statistics
Competition	First-class
Matches	2
Runs scored	5
Batting average	1.25
100s/50s	–/–
Top score	2
Catches/stumpings	1/–
- Source: Cricinfo, 26 April 2020

Reginald Gerard Glennie (11 November 1864 – 24 October 1953) was an English first-class cricketer and clergyman.

The son of the cricketer and clergyman John Glennie and his wife Frances Mary Finch, he was born in November 1864, the 4th of 13 children of the couple at Blore, Staffordshire. He was educated at The King's School in Canterbury, before going up to Keble College, Oxford. While studying at Oxford, he played two first-class cricket matches for Oxford University in 1886, against the touring Australians and Surrey. During his studies, he played minor matches for Staffordshire, a second-class county.

After graduating from Oxford, Glennie took holy orders in the Church of England. He was personal chaplain to William Maclagan, the Archbishop of York, from 1892 to 1895. From 1895 to 1903 he held the post of vicar at Egton in North Yorkshire, before becoming vicar at Sherburn in Elmet in 1903, a post he held until 1912. While holding that post, he was simultaneously the rural dean of Selby, which he was appointed to in 1907 and held until 1922, after which he served as the rural dean of Tadcaster between 1922 and 1926. He was vicar at Boston Spa from 1912 to 1926, and was appointed a canon of York Minster in 1922. After serving as vicar at Boston Spa, he came the vicar at East Harlsey in 1926. Glennie died at Worcester in October 1953.

== Marriage and issue ==
He married firstly Margaret Janet Maclagan (December 1860 - 6 November 1928) on the 28th of April 1895 and had three children:

Hilda Margaret Glennie (10 October 1896 - 5 August 1957)

Dora Florence Glennie (16 June 1900 - 16 April 1982)

Agnes Mary Glennie (29 January 1903 - February 1954)

He married secondly Alice Gertrude Irene Williams (14 November 1872 - 1965) on the 13th of November 1930.
