= Shoo Rayner =

British children's writer

- Born: Hugh Rayner; 1956 (age 69–70)
- Occupations: Author, illustrator
- Children: 2

Shoo Rayner (born Hugh Rayner, 1956) is a British children's author and illustrator.

== Early life ==
He was born to a Norwegian mother and a British father. Rayner's father served in the British Army, so his family moved around a lot growing up, with Rayner spending his formative years in Germany, Pakistan, Yemen, and Wiltshire.

He was given a boarding school education, first at a preparatory school in Surrey and then at King's School, Canterbury. Once his father had left the army, his family settled in Bedford, and he attended Bedford School as a day-boy. His nickname, Shoo, was coined while his family lived in Pakistan, when his nanny, Uppa, was unable to pronounce the name "Hugh", so she called him Shoo instead, and it stuck. Years later, he had his name legally changed to Shoo. He was interviewed at the Cambridge College of Arts and Technology by children's author and illustrator Colin McNaughton, to whom he remains indebted for introducing him to the world of children's books.

== Career ==
Rayner is an author and illustrator. His previous jobs include painting signs and silk screening, as well as working as a mapmaker for the Land Registry, Peterborough.

Rayner's first book contract was with Ernest Benn. The book was to be called The Trouble With Strawberry Jam Pancakes, but, after delivering three separate sets of artwork, the title was shelved. His first published work was a set of six stories for the Oxford Reading Tree called Lydia.

Rayner has had a hand in several popular series for early readers. He is the illustrator for Rose Impey's long-running Animal Crackers books, and, as both author and illustrator, he created the Dark Claw, Rex Files, and Ginger Ninja series. These series have very different themes: the Dark Claw books are a spoof of Star Wars and other such science-fiction stories, starring cats and rodents; the Rex Files (a take-off on the television series The X-Files) feature a duo of canine sleuths named Rex and Franky who investigate various terrifying paranormal events; and the Ginger Ninja books are about a pawball-mad kitten named Ginger who faces typical elementary-school problems such as bullies. Rayner has said that The Ginger Ninja is his favorite book, both because the Ginger Ninja is the character most like him (Rayner himself had bright red hair as a child) and "because that was the book where I looked deepest into the darkest regions of my character and managed to come up almost sane at the end", as he said in an interview with Word Pool.

Despite their different subject matter, all of Rayner's books were designed to be both easy to comprehend and entertaining for children who are learning to read on their own. They feature short sentences, short chapters and almost comic-book-like illustrations. Explaining what he finds most rewarding about his work, Rayner said in the Word Pool interview, "my readers are at the most important stage of reading development, where they can be put off or enthused for life." While he admits that the early-reader genre is often overlooked by critics, "children find it for themselves and read my books by the bucket load. That's my reward."

Rayner illustrated the MudPuddle Farm series of books written by Michael Morpurgo. In January 2012, nine million copies of the books were given away with McDonald's Happy Meals in the United Kingdom.

Rayner has been at the forefront of children's authors using technology. His interactive website has been running since 1997. He started his YouTube Drawing School, ShooRaynerDrawing, in 2010, and won the YouTube NextUpEurope Competition in 2011. He has another successful YouTube channel called DrawStuffRealEasy and ShooRaynerLife which is a blog and entertainment channel featuring "learn British Culture" a tongue-in-cheek look at Britain.

== Personal life ==
Rayner lives in the Forest of Dean, Gloucestershire, with his wife and two children.
