= Nim Hall =

England international rugby union player

- Born: Norman MacLeod Hall; 2 August 1925 Huddersfield, England
- Died: 25 June 1972 (aged 46) (registered in) Paddington, London, England

Rugby union career
- Position: Fly-half
International career
Years	Team	Apps	(Points)
1947–1955	England	17	(Pts:39; Conv:8; Pens:4; Drop:3)

Norman MacLeod "Nim" Hall (2 August 1925 – 25 June 1972) was a rugby union international who represented England from 1947 to 1955. He also captained his country.

== Early life ==
Nim Hall was born on 2 August 1925 in Huddersfield and attended Worksop College a public school in North Nottinghamshire where he first started playing rugby at the age of 11. Whilst at Worksop, Hall represented North of Thames Public Schools and was widely regarded as one of the finest schoolboy rugby players of the early 1940s. The Worksop College Rugby team of 1941/1942 of which Hall played a major part were voted schoolboy rugby team of the year alongside Bedford School, with Hall contributing 129 points out of a total of 403 for the season.

== After school ==
After leaving Worksop College in 1943 Hall enlisted with the Royal Signals and played rugby for St Mary's Hospital Medical School, Paddington and the Army representative team.

== Rugby union career ==
Hall made his international debut on 18 January 1947 at Cardiff Arms Park in the Wales vs England match. Of the 17 matches he played for his national side he was on the winning side on nine occasions. He played his final match for England on 12 February 1955 at Lansdowne Road in the Ireland vs England match.

== Death ==
Nim Hall died on 25 June 1972 at Paddington Hospital in London after a short illness.
