= Worksop College =

Public school in Nottinghamshire, England

Worksop College and Ranby House
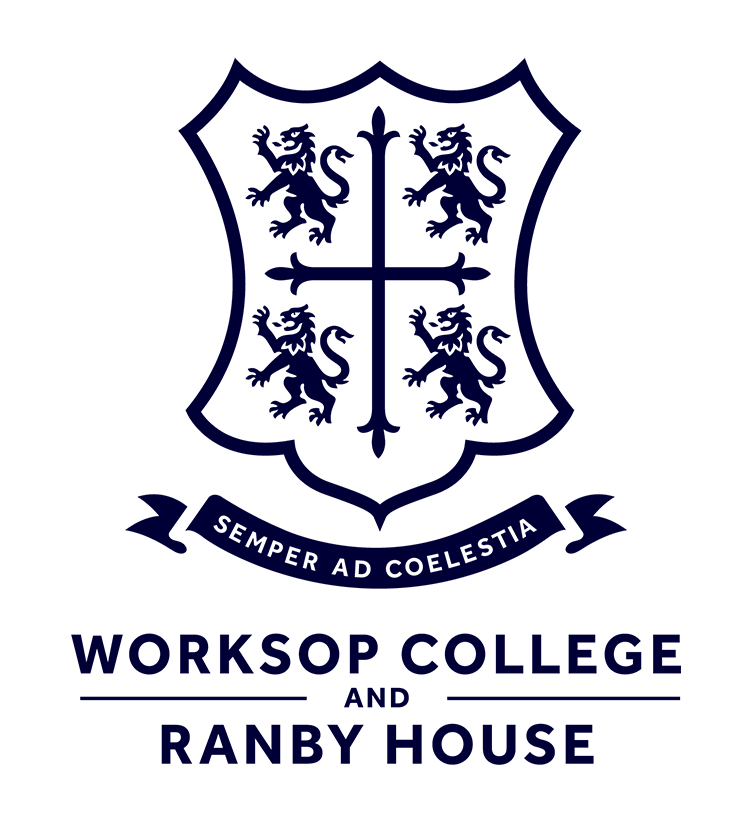

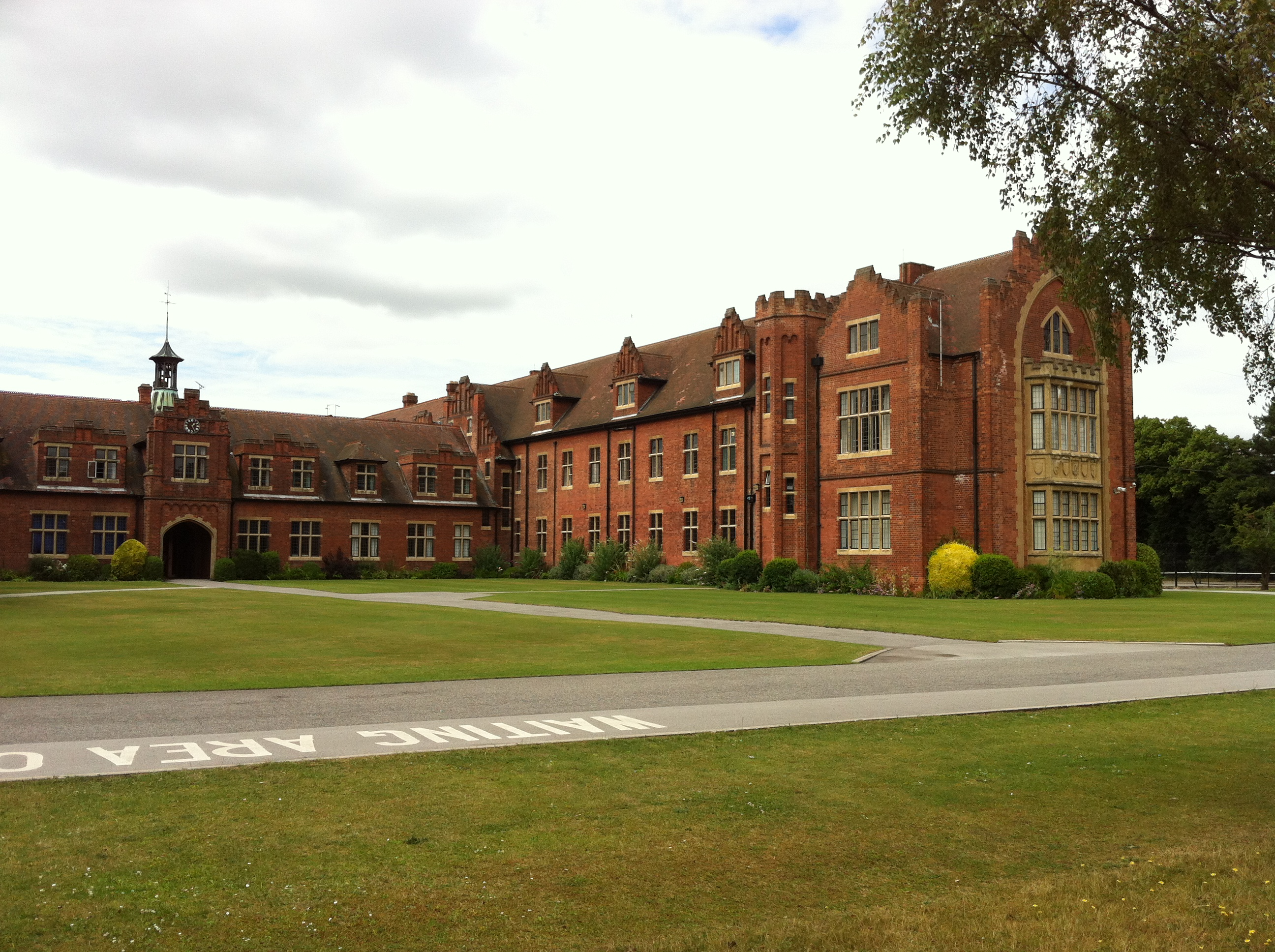
- Worksop College

Location
- Cuthberts Avenue, Worksop, Nottinghamshire, S80 3AP, England; 53.288346°N 1.103639°W

Information
- Type: Public School; Private day and boarding school
- Motto: Semper ad coelestia
- Religious affiliation: Church of England
- Established: 1890
- Founder: Canon Nathaniel Woodard
- Chairman of the Governors (The Custos): Jason Barnsdale
- Head: Charles Bailey
- Staff: 157
- Gender: Co-educational
- Age: 3 to 18
- Enrolment: 520
- Houses: 8
- Publication: The Worksopian
- Alumni: Old Worksopians
- Affiliation: Woodard Corporation; HMC
- Website: https://www.wsnl.co.uk/

Worksop College (formerly St Cuthbert's College) is a British co-educational private school for both boarding and day pupils aged 11 to 18, in Worksop. It sits at the northern edge of Sherwood Forest, in Nottinghamshire, England. Founded by Nathaniel Woodard in 1890, the school is a member of the Woodard Corporation and Headmasters' and Headmistresses' Conference, and has a strong Anglo-Catholic tradition.

== History ==
Construction began in 1890 on St Cuthbert's College with the sinking of a well and laying of a foundation stone. Cuthbert's College was the last school to be personally opened by Woodard himself; Worksop College was officially opened on 5 September 1895, with 5 masters and 44 boys. The land on which the school was built was donated by Henry Pelham-Clinton, 7th Duke of Newcastle, and the drive, which is now tree-lined, was donated by the Duke of Portland. In the early days, buildings were scarce, with only the Great Hall and East Wing complete, plus a temporary chapel. St Cuthbert's Chapel was opened in 1909 after Lord Mountgarret made funds available. Mountgarret did not live to see the finished building; the new building was opened in 1909 by Lady Mountgarret. The early plans for the college chapel were scaled back, due to lack of funds. Cuthbert's College was renamed as Worksop College by Fred Shirley during his time as Headmaster.

=== 1921-1935 ===
Fred Shirley, headmaster from 1921 to 1935, the school prospered, and a building programme was undertaken – the Sanatorium, Squash courts, Eton Fives courts (replaced in the 1960s by the chemistry department), staff houses, Old Theatre, Art School, West Wing, and the top storey of the North Wing were all completed. Shirley's plan was to turn Worksop into the Eton of the Midlands. It was in 1925 the school's name was changed from St Cuthbert's College to Worksop College. Such was Shirley's influence, that a former Prime Minister, Ramsay MacDonald, attended the Speech Day of 1934. By 1935, when Shirley left for King's School, Canterbury, pupil numbers had risen to 500 and the school had gained a good reputation amongst the English Public Schools.

=== The 1950s and 1960s ===
The 1950s and 1960s were another period of growth for the college. New buildings from this time included the gym (now demolished), swimming bath (opened in 1954), Churchill Hall Theatre, Chemistry Department and Talbot House (now School House and language department). A new rugby pitch was leveled in 1954; Jeff Butterfield led a Worksop College XV to victory against Worksop RFC in the opening match.

=== 1980 to present ===
The 1980s and early 1990s were difficult years for Worksop College with pupil numbers falling and little school development. Roger Knight was appointed head in 1991. He left in 1993 to take up a post with the Marylebone Cricket Club and Roy Collard was appointed as headmaster. Not long after Collard started as head, Worksop celebrated its centenary and the Princess Royal opened the new school ICT centre. A new girls' boarding house was opened in early 2007.

Gavin Horgan became headmaster in September 2012. At the same time the prep school came under his leadership, being renamed Worksop College Preparatory School, Ranby House. After Horgan's departure in the summer of 2018, Clare Tilley became the school's first female headteacher. In September 2019, John Price took over as headteacher.

== College buildings ==
Worksop College is a Grade II listed building. It has many fine buildings styled in Tudor Revival including:

- The Great Hall, the centrepiece to Worksop and the first building to be completed. One of the largest rooms in Nottinghamshire, its hammerbeams are spectacular; the original design was based upon Westminster Hall. By R H Carpenter
- The Chapel, in Gothic Revival style opened in 1906. The structure was based upon that of Westminster Abbey and the ceiling contains many passages of Latin verse (specifically these are the words of the Te Deum). By Aston Webb
- The East Wing, the first wing of Worksop to be opened, was blessed in 1895 by the Bishop of Southwell. It was one of the wings added by B D Thompson in 1907, 1928, 1931 and 1934
- The Squash Courts were once lit by natural light, but the former roof has now been replaced by a mezzanine ceiling. The courts are an excellent example of early squash courts. The balcony is particularly noteworthy as the courts were designed in back to back format which is quite rare.

== Publications ==
The school published a magazine, the Cuthbertian, from 1895 to 1920, when the title was changed to the Worksopian.

== Sport ==
=== The Dorm Run ===
The Dorm Run is first mentioned in 1897 as a whole-school paper-chase and was traditionally always run on Shrove Tuesday, however this tradition ceased in the 1950s. The current Dorm Run course is a 3.8 mile route through Clumber Park. Although the course is relatively short from a cross-country perspective, it is difficult due to the undulating terrain. The current Dorm Run record is currently held by Jack Buckner who ran 18:35 in 1980.

=== Rugby ===
Rugby was first introduced at Worksop College in 1921. In the early days many College players were capped by the England Public Schools XV – the first being George Laing in 1930. Laing was also 'invited' to play for Blackheath upon completing his studies at Worksop.

The finest seasons of rugby were enjoyed in the late 1930s and early 1940s where the college remained unbeaten for a number of years. Nim Hall was a member of the College 1st XV for three years between 1940 and 1943 and went on to captain England in the early 1950s.

The appointment of England and British Lion Jeff Butterfield in 1954 as a master at the college, quickly led to a surge in success. In 1960 the college rugby sevens team captained by D.E. Tarbatt and coached by Butterfield, reached the final of the Roslyn Park competition, narrowly losing out to the Belfast Acadeemicals in the final.

=== Hockey ===
Hockey has been played at Worksop since 1929 when it was introduced as an official sport after being played for a number of years by "enthusiasts" prior to this time. Worksop has been producing national, international and club players ever since those early years.

In the early days, fixtures were mainly played against local clubs and schools with little in the way of tournaments. Later, Worksop took part in the annual Public Schools Hockey Festival (Oxford) for many years. In the late 1990s, Worksop started entering the County Schools competition and found success there. The mid to late 2000s were probably the most successful seasons for hockey at Worksop with the boys 1st XI winning a number of Midland titles and finishing as national semi-finalists in 2006/2007 (losing to Kingston Grammar School) and losing finalists in 2007/2008 (losing to Dean Close School). Success hasn't just been limited to the boys, the girls 1st XI finished runners up to Repton School at the 2009/2010 national finals. Most recently the college under 16 boys finished runners-up to Whitgift School in the National Indoor Championships in 2016.

There are currently three Old Worksopians in the England/Great Britain hockey setup:

- Adam Dixon
- Sam Ward
- Ollie Willars

=== Athletics ===
Worksop has produced a number of international athletes over the years:

==== England Schools champions ====
- P.R. Brunyee (Talbot 1951–1956) – intermediate boys 110y hurdles champion 1955 and senior boys 120y hurdles champion 1956
- M. Lambley (Shirley 2001–2006) – junior boys hammer champion 2002, senior boys hammer champion 2005

==== Junior AAA champions ====
- W. Heath (Pelham 1926–1931) – 100y and 220y champion 1931
- W.B. Thompson (Mountgarret 1949–1954) – 200y low hurdles champion 1954
- J.R. Buckner (Talbot 1975–1980) – 1500m champion 1980

==== Senior AAA champion ====
- J.R. Buckner – 5000m 1986 and 1992, 10k road 1985

==== Olympians ====
- J.R. Buckner – Seoul 1988, 5th place 5000m and Barcelona 1992, semi finals 5000m
- T.C. Buckner (Talbot 1976–1981) – Barcelona 1992, semi-finals 3000m steeplechase

==== Commonwealth/Empire Games ====
- P.R. Brunyee – Cardiff 1958, heats 120y hurdles
- D.M.W. Griffiths (Mason 1954–1960) – Perth 1962, heats 880y and mile
- J.R. Buckner – Edinburgh 1986, silver 5000m
- T.C. Buckner – Victoria 1994, 5th 3000m steeplechase
- M. Lambley – Delhi 2010, qualifying hammer

==== European Championships ====
- J.R. Buckner – Stuttgart 1986, champion 5000m (championship best performance)
- W.R.G Foster (Portland 1971–1975) – Helsinki 1994, 31st marathon

==== Other representatives ====
- M.P. Hay (Mountgarret 1968–1973) – GB under 23 decathlon 1975
- S.T. Lewis (Shirley 1988–1993) – Wales junior 3000m steeplechase 1993
- S.D. Heggie (Portland 1989–1994) – GB Under 23 400m 1994

== Preparatory School ==
Ranby House
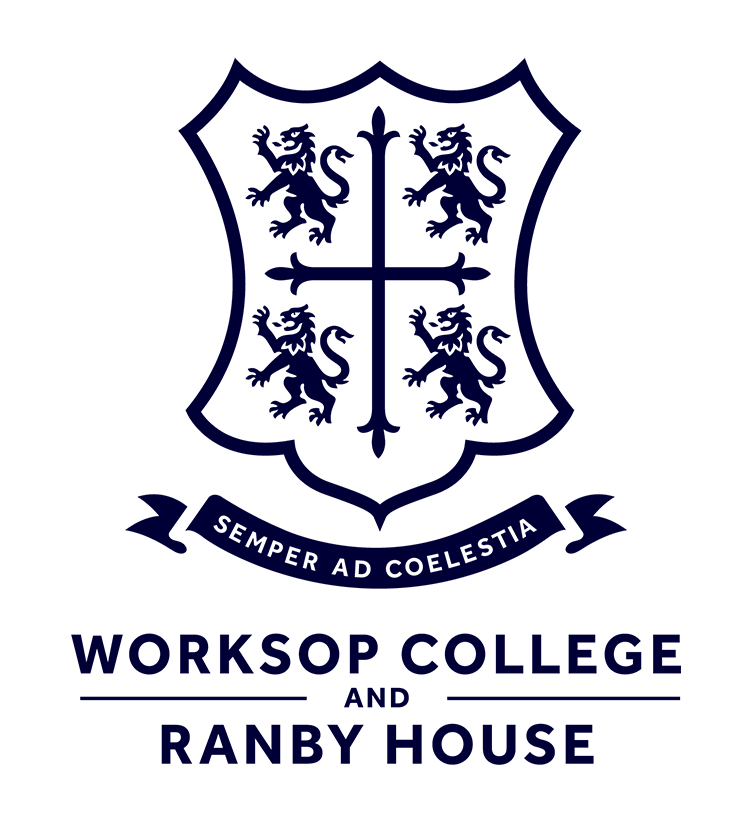

Location
- Retford, Nottinghamshire, DN22 8HX; England; 53°19′21″N 1°00′59″W

Information
- Type: Independent day and boarding school
- Motto: Semper ad coelestia
- Established: 1948
- Founder: Nathaniel Woodard
- Department for Education URN: 122928 Tables
- Ofsted: Reports
- Chairman of the Governors: Jason Barnsdale
- Headmaster: David Thorpe
- Gender: Co-educational
- Age: 3 to 11
- Houses: 4
- Colours: Navy blue, white and gold
- Affiliation: Woodard Corporation
- Website: http://www.wsnl.co.uk

Ranby House is a co-educational independent preparatory, day and boarding, school for boys and girls aged 3 to 11. The school is the feeder to Worksop College which is located five miles away. The school currently has around 200 pupils and the Headmaster is David Thorpe. The school has two main parts, the 'Pre-Prep' (3–7 years of age) and the 'Prep School'. The 'Prep School' is then divided further into the four groups or houses: St Alban; St Benedict; St Columba; and St Dunstan.

Former pupils of the school include British actor and dancer Richard Winsor, GB hammer thrower Matthew Lambley and Katie Walter, the youngest person to go on an expedition to the South Pole in 2009.

=== History ===
Ranby House was the property of Sir Albert Bingham who was from a family of wealthy Sheffield steelmasters. Following Sir Albert's death, the house and the Elkesley estate were sold at auction in May 1948. The house was bought by Col. H.H. Storey on behalf of the Woodard School Trust. As well as the house and stables the Trust also bought 30 acres (120,000 m^{2}) of grounds, park and woodland. The school opened in October 1948 with 42 boys.

The estate was originally purchased due to the "Prep" at Worksop College reaching 90 pupils and exceeding the capacity of the Prep Wing (now Portland House). There were at first joint headmasters, George Clayton and William Adler. Clayton retired in 1953. There was only accommodation for 30 boys at Ranby, so the remaining 60 stayed at the college until the remainder finally moved over in 1953. At Ranby the coach-house and stables were converted into the chapel with an organ being installed in 1962. As new classrooms were constructed in the quadrangle, those in the house became dormitories and pupil numbers rose. Other additions were a sports pavilion, swimming pool, dining hall, new chapel, two gymnasiums, resources centre, computer department, the boxing 'long room' was converted into science laboratories, a performing arts centre and 15 acres (61,000 m^{2}) of land were converted into sports pitches.

It was announced in April 2011 that the school was to benefit from a £500,000 investment in the development of the school over the next two years. The plan was to spend the money on classroom development and state-of-the-art teaching equipment.

In 2016 the Governors of Worksop College announced that they planned to close the Ranby House site and transfer the operation to a purpose-built building within the college's main site in Worksop. The Ranby property was placed on the market in the summer of 2017; it was still on the market as of summer 2018, and in autumn 2019 it was announced that the relocation plan would not go ahead.

== Notable alumni ==
Former students of Worksop College are referred to as Old Worksopians.

== Notable masters ==
- Fred Shirley – Headmaster 1921 to 1935
- Jeff Butterfield – Captain of England rugby team in the 1950s
- Ken Farnes – England fast bowler in the 1930s
- Alan Old – England rugby fly half 1972–1978

== See also ==
- Listed buildings in Worksop
