= Garluark =

- Occupations: Prophet and leader
- Years active: 1922–35

Garluark (fl. 1922–1935) was a leader of the Nuer people of Sudan. Described as a powerful prophet, he led his people in revolt against the Anglo-Egyptian authorities in 1923. He was captured in 1925 but after swearing allegiance to the British was freed and placed in position as indirect ruler of his former territory. After the British district commissioner was murdered in 1927 a force led by Major Lionel Bostock captured Garluark once again. He was freed once more in 1935 and reinstated as ruler.

== Life ==
Garluark has been described as a "powerful and influential prophet" of the Nuer people. Sudan was at the time under the control of an Anglo-Egyptian condominium and the British administrator for Garluark's territory was district commissioner Captain V. Fergusson. Initially, in 1922, Garluark refused to communicate with Fergusson however later that year he agreed to meet for negotiations which seemed to be proceeding well until Garluark left abruptly.

In 1923 Garluark led the Nuer in the eastern portion of Bahr-al-Ghazal in rebellion against the Anglo-Egyptian authorities. British troops led by Fergusson were initially unable to put down the revolt, but in January 1925 he led a strong force through the Nyuong region which killed the Nuer and burnt their villages. Garluark was captured but, after swearing his allegiance, Fergusson set him free to rule the region on behalf of Britain. He was said to be much feared by the chiefs and sub-chiefs of the region owing to his links with the British.

Fergusson was murdered in December 1927, allegedly on the orders of a local chief, but Garluark was blamed. A simultaneous uprising occurred by the Nuer of the Sobat River region. Two expeditions were launched against the Nuer, one to the Sobat River under Captain JR Chidlaw-Robert and one against Garluark under Major Lionel Bostock. Garluark's men were surrounded by ground troops and attacked by Royal Air Force aircraft. The campaign ended on 7 February 1928 and Garluark was captured and imprisoned at Malakal. Garluark was reinstated as an indirect ruler in 1935 after Fergusson's murderers had been brought to justice.
