= François Carlo Antommarchi =

Italian physician

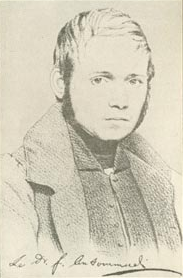
- Born: 5 July 1780; Morsiglia, Corsica
- Died: 3 April 1838 (aged 57); Santiago de Cuba, Cuba
- Occupation: Doctor of Medicine/Surgeon
- Parent(s): Juan Antommarchi and Bidgetta Matey

François Carlo Antommarchi (5 July 1780 – 4 March 1838) was Napoleon's medical doctor from 1819 to his death in 1821.

He began his studies in Livorno, Italy, and later earned the degree of Doctor of Philosophy and Medicine at the University of Pisa in March 1808. Antommarchi then went to Florence, Italy, and was attached to the Hospital of Santa Maria Nuova. (Note: Leonardo da Vinci studied anatomy at the Hospital of Santa Maria Nuova) Antommarchi earned the diploma of Surgeon in 1812 from the University of Florence (i.e. Imperial University) and was appointed by its president as Prosector. While in this capacity, Antommarchi worked under Paolo Mascagni (1752–1815) starting on 7 July 1813.

Antommarchi left Florence for Saint Helena to become Napoleon I's physician until his death. Antommarchi took up this position at the behest of Napoleon's mother Maria Letizia Ramolino and his uncle Cardinal Joseph Fesch. Antommarchi received a letter of employment on 19 December 1818. Antommarchi was sent to St. Helena in replacement of Dr Barry Edward O'Meara as Napoleon's personal physician because the illustrious captive would not agree to accept medical officers such as Dr Alexander Baxter or Dr James Roch Verling, who were proposed to him by his custodian Sir Hudson Lowe. However, Napoleon was not so impressed by Antommarchi's medical skills and even dismissed him from his service a couple of times, only to let him resume his duty soon after. In the last moments of illness, Antommarchi was assisted by Dr Archibald Arnott, who was accepted by Napoleon at the pressing demands from his two officers, Count Montholon and Grand-Marshal Bertrand. After Napoleon's death, Antommarchi wrote The Last Moments of Napoleon where he concluded that Napoleon died of stomach cancer.

In 1831 Antommarchi went to Poland and became the general inspector of Polish hospitals during November Uprising where he assisted the Polish people in an uprising against the Russians. He fled to Paris to escape the czar's forces.

Antommarchi then immigrated to Louisiana where he donated the bronze death mask of Napoleon to the people of New Orleans in 1834. Antommarchi lived in Veracruz, Mexico, for a brief period, and was employed there as an itinerant physician. He moved from Mexico and settled in Santiago de Cuba, Cuba, where he again worked as a physician and privately taught anatomy and sculpting. The move to Cuba was prompted by Antommarchi seeking his cousin Antonio Juan Benjamin Antommarchi, who made his fortune in coffee plantations. Antommarchi became adept at performing surgery for the removal of cataracts. He died in Cuba, of yellow fever, on 3 April 1838, at the age of 57.

== Life chronology ==
Event	Place	Date
Birth	Morsiglia, Corsica, France	5 July 1780
Earned Doctor of Philosophy and Medicine Degree	Pisa, Italy	March 1808
Earned Surgeon Diploma	Florence, Italy	1812
Became Prosector	Florence, Italy	7 July 1813
Became Napoleon I's physician	Saint Helena, United Kingdom	19 December 1818
Arrived in Saint Helena	Saint Helena, United Kingdom	10 September 1819
Made Napoleon's Death Mask	Saint Helena, United Kingdom	7 May 1821
Published "Anatomical Prints of the Human Body with Natural Dimensions"	Paris, France	1823
Published various books based on his diary of Napoleon's medical care		1823–1826
Became general inspector of Polish hospitals	Poland	1831
Moved to Santiago de Cuba, Cuba	Santiago de Cuba, Cuba	1834
Visited Louisiana	Louisiana, United States	1834
Visited Veracruz	Veracruz, Mexico	June–July 1837
Death	Santiago de Cuba, Cuba	3 April 1838

== Works ==
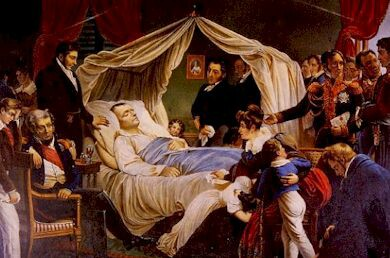
"Death of Napoleon", by Charles de Steuben, 1828. Dr Antommarchi is standing next to Napoleon with his hand on the pillow. (Note: The "Death of Napoleon" painting is currently displayed at Musée de l'Armée in Paris, France.)

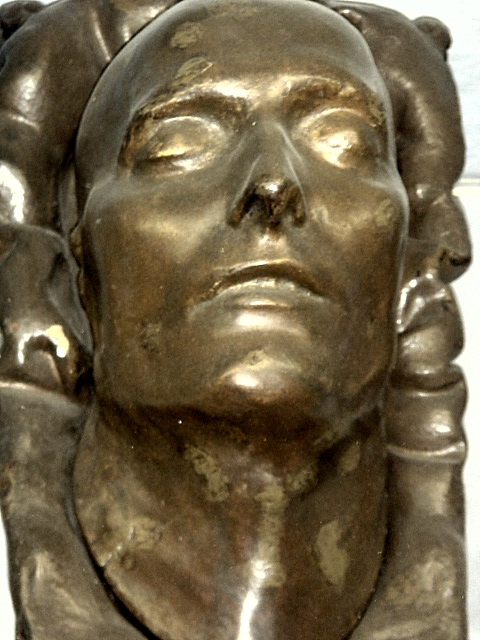
Death Mask of Napoleon, front view

=== Dissertation on cataract, 1808 ===
This work is mentioned in The Memorial of Saint Helena by Emmanuel, comte de Las Cases.

=== Napoleon's death mask, 1821 ===
On 7 May 1821 Antommarchi took a plaster cast of Napoleon's face. Numerous copies of this cast have been made and some can be seen at these locations:

- Louisiana State Museum – The Cabildo, New Orleans, Louisiana, United States
- Museo Napoleónico de La Habana, Habana, Cuba
- Art Institute of Chicago, Chicago, Illinois, United States
- University of North Carolina at Chapel Hill, Chapel Hill, North Carolina, United States
- Museo Nacional de Historia, Chapultepec Castle, Mexico City, Mexico
- Musée de l'Armée, Paris, France
- St. Louis Mercantile Library, St. Louis, Missouri, United States

=== Diary of Napoleon's medical care ===
Antommarchi's diary contained detailed records of his medical care for Napoleon. This diary is a source for numerous books published between 1823 and 1826. These books have been published in many languages including French, English, German, Italian, and Spanish.

=== Anatomical Prints of the Human Body with Natural Dimensions, Paris, 1823 ===
Paolo Mascagni (1752–1815) was the most celebrated anatomist of his day. Antommarchi became Prosector to Mascagni who left manuscripts and drawings for an intended publication of a comprehensive complete anatomy with life-size figures. Antommarchi prepared the publication but was meanwhile called to Saint Helena. Antommarchi left, taking with him three copies of Mascagni's plates. When Antommarchi returned, he published these plates, printed from lithographs, under his own name in a monumental work which appeared from 1823 to 1826 under the title of: "Planches anatomiques du corps humain exécutées d'après les dimensions naturelles accompagnées d'un texte explicatif". The plates for the publication were drawn and possibly engraved by Antoine Seratoni.

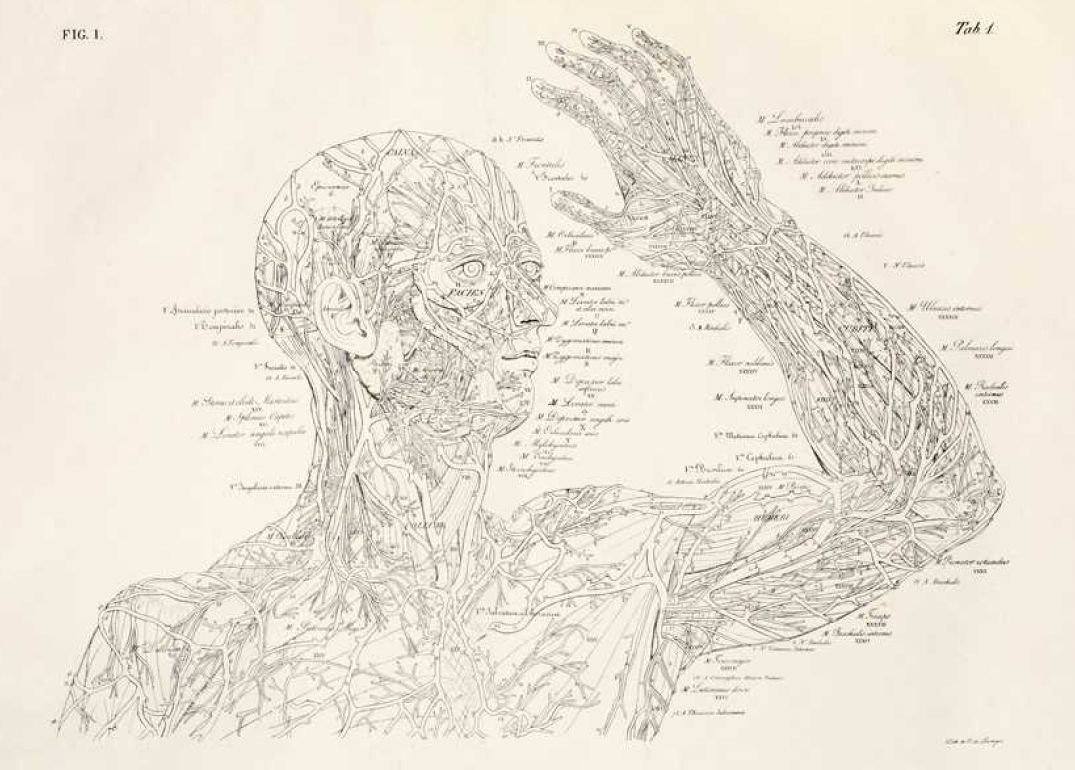
Paolo Mascagni's anatomical drawing with Antommarchi's annotations.

== Name variants ==
François Carlo Antommarchi's original name has many variants in the literature due to translations and misspellings:

- Francesco Carlo Antommarchi (original Italian name)
- François Charles Antommarchi (French translation)
- Francisco Carlos Antommarchi (Spanish translation)
- Francis Charles Antommarchi (English translation)
- Francesco Carlo Antomarchi (misspelling)

The phonetic pronunciation of "François" is "frahn-swah".

== Controversy ==
=== Birth ===
The literature cites both 1780 and 1789 as the birth date of Antommarchi.

=== Napoleon's death mask ===
It is unclear if the original cast for the death mask of Napoleon made by Antommarchi survived. It is said that Antommarchi's cast failed but Dr Francis Burton apparently took another cast which survived. To complicate matters, Madame Bertrand, apparently related to Henri Gatien Bertrand and Napoleon's attendant, is said to have stolen a large part of the cast taken by Burton and given it to Antommarchi.

No unequivocal and decisive proof has ever been presented to settle this controversy and it may never be resolved. Possible motivations for this controversy, for both parties, can include but are not limited to:

- Fierce rivalry between the conquerors, i.e. the British, and the conquered, i.e. the French
- Profiteering
- Fameseeking

=== Cast of Napoleon's right hand ===
Despite a post-mortem cast of Bonaparte's right hand, allegedly by Antommarchi, sold and exhibited in museums, none of the persons that were present in Saint Helena when Napoleon died ever reported that such a cast occurred. On the contrary, his servant Louis-Étienne Saint-Denis regrets in his memoirs that nobody had the idea to cast Napoleon's hands.

=== Mascagni Heirs ===
A legal dispute between Antommarchi and the heirs of Mascagni regarding the rights to Mascagni's plates was never resolved.
