= Matthew Lambley =

Personal information
- Born: 1987 (age 38–39)
- Education: Loughborough University

Sport
- Event: Hammer Throw

Matthew Lambley (born 1987) is a Great Britain hammer thrower at one time ranked 16th United Kingdom all-time list for the 7.26 kg implement (71.70m). Lambley gained a sports scholarship to Worksop College where he won various England Schools titles. After completing his A-levels he moved to Loughborough University and then The University of Huddersfield. In May 2009 he won the hammer throw at the BUCS athletics championships and the Loughborough International Meeting. He repeated both these victories in 2010 which included setting a new BUCS championship record of 70.35m. In July 2009 he represented Great Britain at the 7th European Under 23 Championships in Lithuania. At the 2010 Commonwealth Games he represented England, coming in 10th.

He subsequently moved into coaching.
