= Benefactor =

Benefactor may refer to:

- Benefactor (album), a 1982 album by Romeo Void
- Benefactor (law) for a person whose actions benefit another or a person that gives back to others
- Benefication (metallurgy) in extractive metallurgy
- Benefactors (play), a 1984 play
- Benefactor (video game), a 1994 video game
- The Benefactor (TV series), a 2004 reality TV series
- The Benefactor (2015 film), a 2015 film
- The Benefactor (1942 film), a 1942 French drama film

== See also ==
- A Malefactor
- Malefactor, Ade
