= Death mask of Napoleon =

1821 death mask and its copies

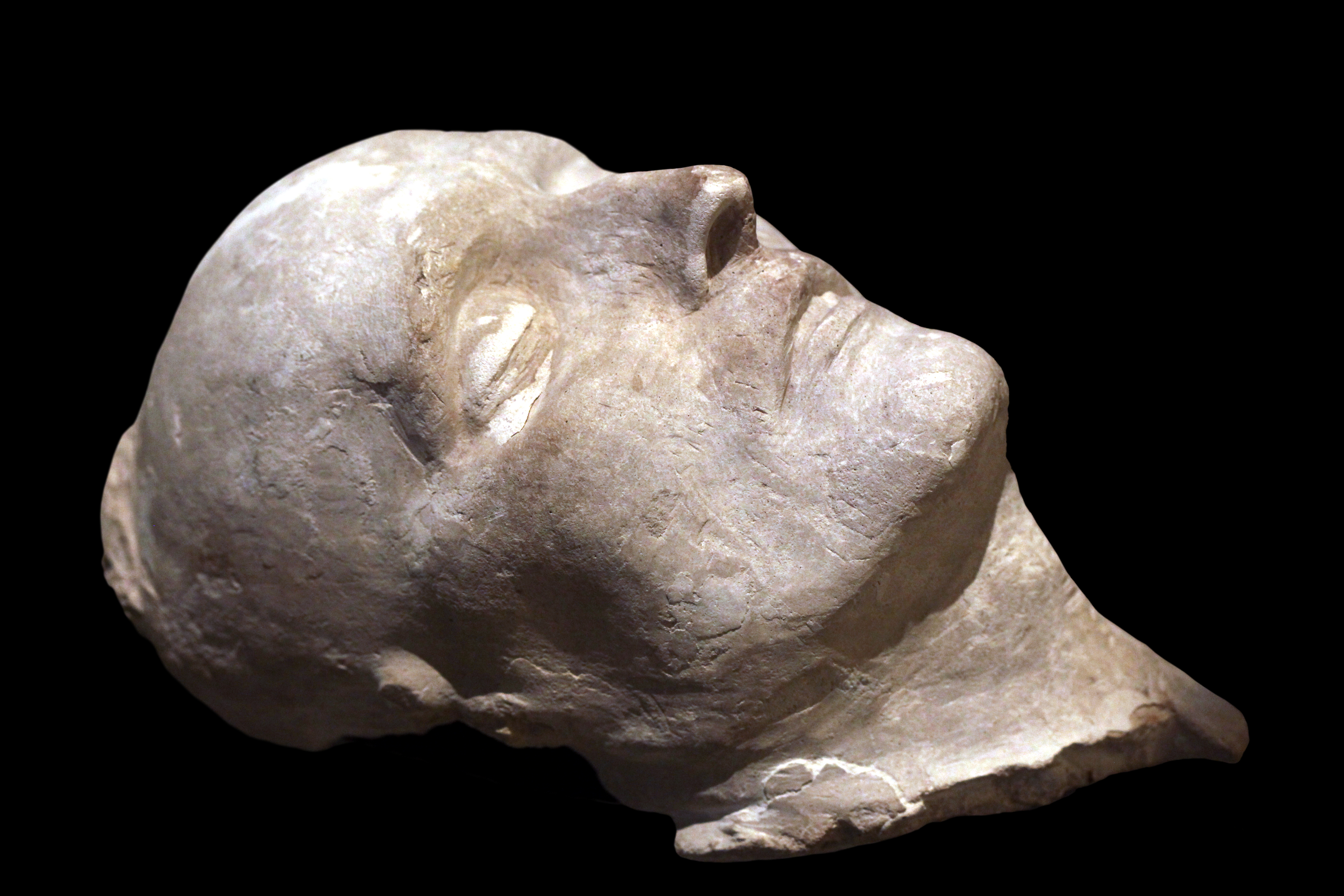
François Carlo Antommarchi's death mask of Napoleon, as seen in the Musée de l'Armée, Paris

During the time of Napoleon Bonaparte, it was customary to cast a death mask of a great leader who had recently died. A mixture of wax or plaster was placed over Napoleon's face and removed after the form had hardened. From this impression, subsequent copies were cast. Much mystery and controversy surrounds the origins and whereabouts of the most original cast moulds. There are only four genuine bronze death masks known to exist.

== History ==
Napoleon's original death mask was created on 7 May 1821, a day and a half after the former emperor died on the island of Saint Helena at age 51. Surrounding his deathbed were doctors from France and the United Kingdom. Some historical accounts contend that François Carlo Antommarchi (one of several doctors who encircled Napoleon's deathbed) cast the original "parent mould", which would later be used to reproduce bronze and additional plaster copies.

Other records, however, indicate that Francis Burton, a surgeon attached to the British Army's 66th Regiment at Saint Helena, presided at the emperor's autopsy and during that postmortem procedure cast the original mould. Antommarchi obtained from his British colleagues a secondary plaster mould from Burton's original cast. With that second-generation mould, Antommarchi in France reportedly made further copies of the death mask in plaster as well as in bronze.

Yet another contention regarding the origins of the death mask and its copies is that Madame Bertrand, Napoleon's attendant on Saint Helena, allegedly stole part of the original cast, leaving Burton with only the ears and back of the head. The British doctor subsequently sued Bertrand to retrieve the cast, but failed. A year later Bertrand gave Antommarchi a copy of the mask, from which he had several copies made. One of those he sent to Lord Burghersh, the British envoy (representative) in Florence, asking him to pass it to sculptor Antonio Canova. However, Canova died before he had time to use the mask and instead the piece remained with Burghersh. The National Museums Liverpool version, cast by E. Quesnel, is thought to be a descendant of that mask.

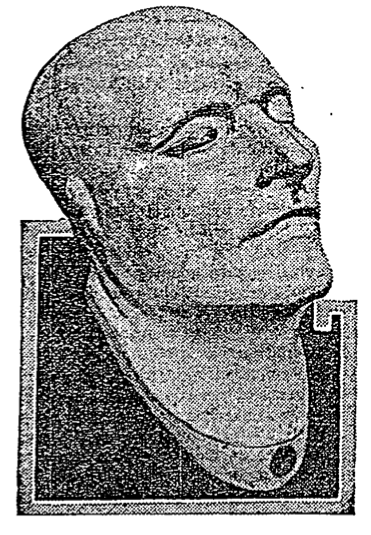
This Napoleon Death Mask, pictured here in Havana, Cuba, appeared in the New York Times in 1919, apparently created by François Carlo Antommarchi.

Some people believe that Antommarchi lived in Cuba for a short period of time and contracted yellow fever. While there he lived on his cousin's coffee plantation and became close to General Juan de Moya. Before Antommarchi died, he made General Moya a death mask from his mould. The Cuban General José Lacret Morlot – the descendant of a wealthy French family – then purchased the mask from Moya. It is believed that the mask still resides in the Museum in Santiago de Cuba, Oriente Province, where there was a large group of French immigrants that established coffee plantations in the high mountains of the Sierra Maestra.

New Orleans authorities moved their death mask in 1853. During the tumult that accompanied the Civil War, the mask disappeared. A former city treasurer spotted the mask in 1866 as it was being hauled to the dump in a junk wagon. Rather than return the mask to the city, the treasurer took the mask home and put it on display there. Eventually Napoleon's death mask wound up in the Atlanta home of Captain William Greene Raoul, president of the Mexican National Railroad. Finally, in 1909, Napoleon's death mask made its way back to New Orleans. Raoul read a newspaper article about the missing mask and wrote to the mayor of its whereabouts. In exchange for suitable acknowledgement, Raoul agreed to donate the death mask to New Orleans. The mayor transferred the mask to the Louisiana State Museum that year.

Interactive 3D model

Video showing the volumes of the mask

== Locations ==
In 1834, Antommarchi traveled to the United States, visited New Orleans, and presented that city with a bronze copy of the mask. The French doctor also gave a painted plaster copy to a colleague in New Orleans, Edwin Smith. Following the death of Smith, the plaster mask was given to the family of Captain Francis Bryan, a resident of St. Louis, Missouri. In 1894, Bryan donated this mask to his alma mater, the University of North Carolina at Chapel Hill.

During its first years in Chapel Hill, Napoleon's plaster face was displayed as a curio on a table in the office of UNC President George T. Winston. The death mask was later transferred to the university library and ultimately found its way to the library's North Carolina Collection. Today, the mask remains in remarkably good condition. The only visible damage to it is a chip above the emperor's upper lip. That damage occurred in 1907, when a janitor at the university overturned the mask while dusting it. On the underside of the mask is the handwritten inscription: "Dr. Edwin B. Smith's head of Nap.n" and "Presented to Dr. Smith by N[ap's] Phys'n. Dr.Ant[tommarchi]." Also written on the bottom of the mask is "Tête d'Armée" (Head of the Army), reportedly the last words uttered by Napoleon.

A bronze death mask is in the collection of the Auckland Art Gallery; it was donated by Sir George Grey and is attributed to Antommarchi.

An 1833 bronze casting belongs to the Ruth and Elmer Wellin Museum of Art at Hamilton College in Clinton, New York. It bears a seal at the base of the sculpture for the L. Richard et E. Quesnal Foundry.

Another 1833 bronze casting belongs to the Nelda C. and H.J. Lutcher Stark Foundation at The W.H. Stark House in Orange, Texas. It bears a seal at the base of the sculpture for the L. Richard et E. Quesnal Foundry.

Another death mask formerly owned by John Codman Ropes now resides in the lobby of Boston University's Mugar Library.
