= Thomas Tweed (cricketer) =

Sri Lankan cricketer

Personal information
- Full name: Thomas Edward Tweed
- Born: 11 December 1904; Colombo, Western Province, British Ceylon
- Died: 23 March 1973 (aged 68); Colombo, Western Province, Sri Lanka
- Batting: Right-handed
- Bowling: Right-arm medium

Domestic team information
- Years: Team
- 1925–1926: Cambridge University

Career statistics
Competition	First-class
Matches	4
Runs scored	97
Batting average	19.40
100s/50s	–/–
Top score	24
Balls bowled	360
Wickets	5
Bowling average	35.40
5 wickets in innings	–
10 wickets in match	–
Best bowling	2/30
Catches/stumpings	3/–
- Source: Cricinfo, 26 January 2022

Thomas Edward Tweed (11 December 1904 — 23 March 1973) was a Sri Lankan first-class cricketer.

Tweed was born at Colombo in December 1904. He was educated in Colombo at both the Royal College and S. Thomas' College, before studying in England at the University of Cambridge. While studying at Cambridge, he played first-class cricket for Cambridge University Cricket Club in 1925 and 1926, making four appearances. He scored 97 runs in these four matches, at an average of 19.40 and with a highest score of 24. With his right-arm medium pace bowling, he took 5 wickets with best figures of 2 for 30. Tweed died at Colombo in March 1973.
