= The King's School, Canterbury =

Public school in Canterbury, Kent, England

The King's School

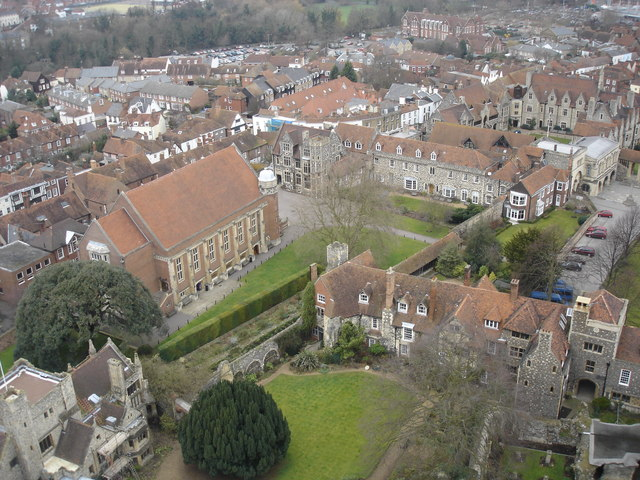
- The school viewed from Canterbury Cathedral

Location
- 25 The Precincts; Canterbury, Kent, CT1 2ES; England; 51.281671°N 1.082710°E

Information
- Type: Public school Private, boarding and day school Cathedral school
- Religious affiliation: Church of England
- Established: 597; 1429 years ago
- Founder: Augustine of Canterbury
- Local authority: Kent County Council
- Department for Education URN: 118996 Tables
- Chairman of Governors: Nicholas Lyons
- Headmaster: Ms Jude Lowson
- Chaplain: The Reverend Lindsay Collins
- Gender: Mixed
- Age range: 13–18
- Enrolment: 985 (2026)
- Capacity: 1060
- Houses: 17
- Colours: Blue and white
- Yearbook: The Cantuarian
- Affiliations: Headmasters' and Headmistresses' Conference; Eton Group
- Alumni: Old King's Scholars (OKS)
- Website: www.kings-school.co.uk

The King's School is a public school in Canterbury, Kent, England for pupils aged 13-18. It is a member of the Headmasters' and Headmistresses' Conference and the Eton Group. It is Britain's oldest public school and is considered to be the oldest continuously operating school in the world, as education on the abbey and cathedral grounds has been uninterrupted since AD 597. (Note: Shishi Middle School in China claims a foundation c.142 BC but this is disputed owing to a gap in its functioning.)

== History ==
=== Establishment ===
The historical claim of a founding date in AD 597 is difficult to verify directly. (Note: Certain sources claim a founding date of AD 598 instead, Arthur Francis Leach writes in his book The Schools of Medieval England: "It may be safely asserted that in this year, 598, as an adjunct to Christ Church Cathedral, or rather as a part of it.") Although there is evidence that St Augustine did in fact establish a centre of learning in Canterbury, as part of a mission to re-establish Christianity in the Kingdom of Kent (known as the Gregorian mission).

The majority of what we know about Augustine's mission comes from the writings of St Bede, specifically the Ecclesiastical History of the English People, in which Bede notes the following about education in AD 630:

Desiring to imitate what he (the ruling king) had seen well arranged abroad, set up a school in which boys were taught grammar; he was assisted by Bishop Felix, whom he had received from Kent, and who gave them [ushers] and masters, after the fashion of the Kentish folk. (Bede, 731) (Note: St Bede did not personally witness these events, and writes around a century after, compiling many letters and accounts in Northumbria.)

C.E. Woodruff (OKS) and H.J. Cape note that from the passage Bede suggests that flourishing, well-established schools were already in Kent by 630, so much so that they were used as educational models for other schools. Although no specific school nor city is named, the text most likely refers to Augustine's school in Canterbury due to the city's significance as the kingdom's capital. Woodruff writes that: "Now Kent in this connection must mean Canterbury, or at least Canterbury before all other places." The establishment of a school would also have been a significant priority for Augustine's mission so that future clergy could be educated for the newly established English church.

Unlike schools in the later Middle Ages with a much broader, modern curriculum, Augustine's school in late antiquity Britain was likely not a separately constituted institution, but instead a cathedral and nearby abbey (both of which were founded by Augustine) providing education to the people.

Education in these times should be seen as a function of Cathedrals and some other churches [abbeys]: no grammar school was 'established'. Once the matter is seen in this light, the controversy disappears. Canterbury has the oldest great church. Therefore, Canterbury has the oldest education. (D.L Edwards, 1957)

In 668, Theodore of Tarsus was enthroned as Archbishop of Canterbury and brought Hadrian from Monte Cassino, both of whom were distinguished scholars of their time. We learn from Bede that the school particularly flourished under their leadership, teaching subjects such as: Latin, Greek, music, astronomy and arithmetic. Saints such as St John of Beverley and St Aldhelm were educated at the school during that period. (Note: In William Lambarde's Perambulation of Kent, he instead claims that Theodore founded a new school: "Theodore, by licence of Vitelianus [then Pope] founded within the Citie, a Schoole [or college] wherein he placed Professours of all the liberall Sciences.")

=== 16th century to present day ===
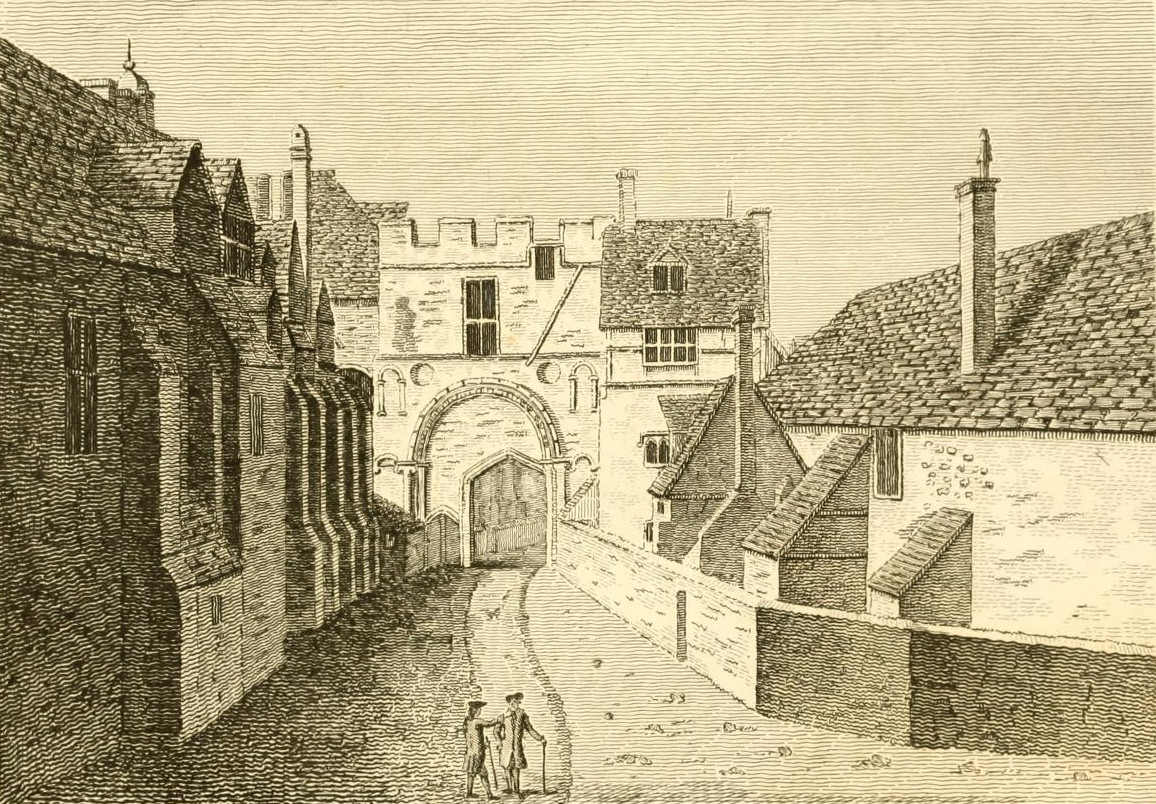
Green Court Gate (c.1160) with the former almonry building on the left

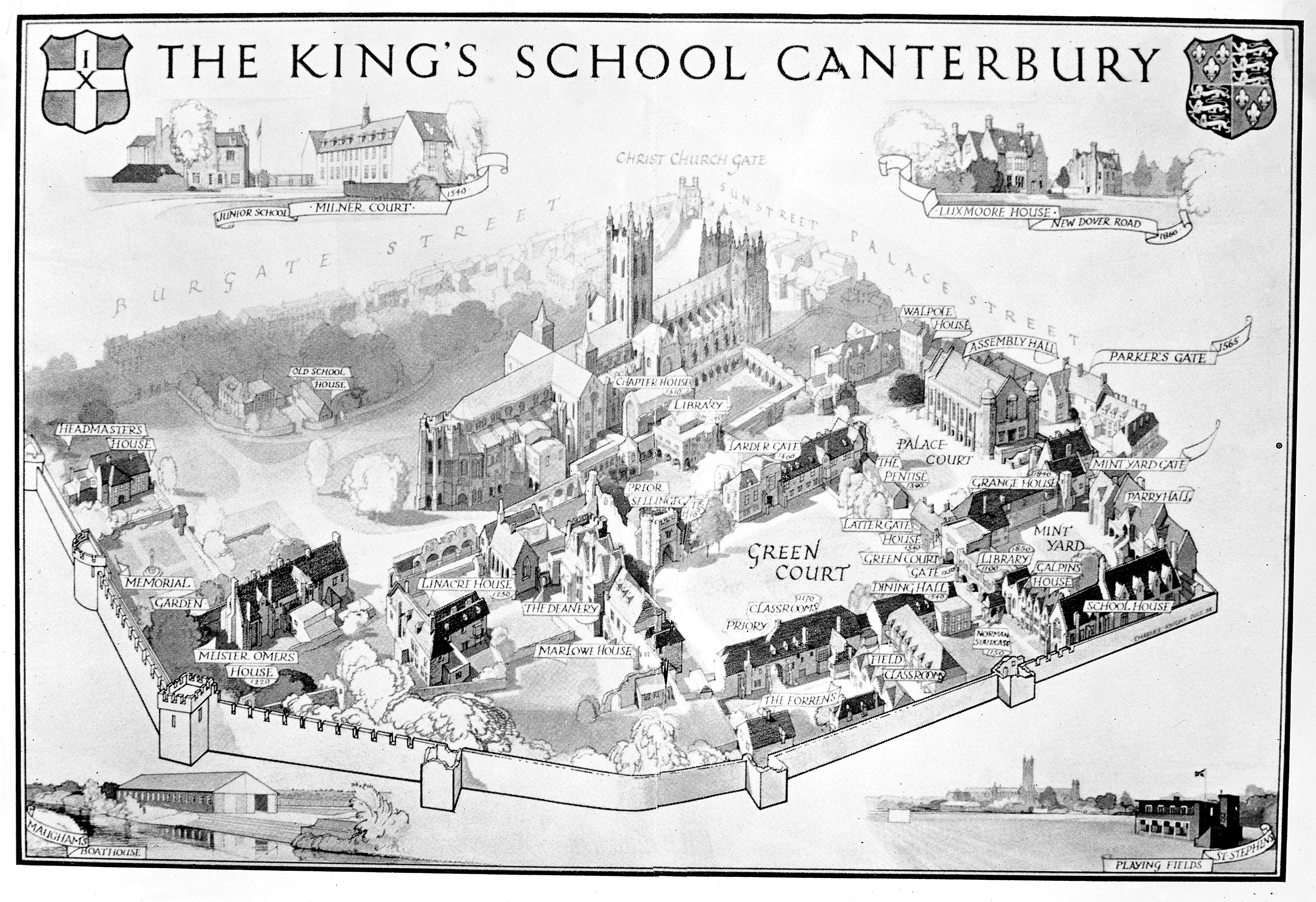
Map of The King's School (c.1960)

During the Dissolution of the Monasteries, the school was re-founded by Royal Charter in 1541. A Headmaster, a Lower Master, and fifty King's Scholars were established and the name "King's School" was used for the first time, referring to King Henry VIII. Cardinal Pole moved the school to the Mint Yard and acquired the Almonry building, which was in use for over 300 years.

Throughout the next 100 years, several former pupils achieved national recognition helping the school establish its reputation; these include the first headmaster, John Twyne, and Christopher Marlowe, William Harvey and John Tradescant the Younger. Under the leadership of John Mitchinson, the buildings and academic standards were improved. Around this time the school became a "public school" with a national reputation.

When Canon John "Fred" Shirley became headmaster in 1935, the school was suffering from the effects of the depression. He managed the school's rapid expansion to around 600 pupils over the next 30 years, constructing further buildings in the precincts and helping the school survive the war-time evacuation. The school received a new Royal Charter from King George VI and Queen Elizabeth in 1946. During this time, the school's reputation grew, bolstered by its academic and sporting successes.

The school was boys-only for almost 1400 years, until the early 1970s, when girls were admitted to the Sixth Form for the first time. The school has been fully co-educational since 1990. The school is also the oldest charity in the UK.

== Buildings ==
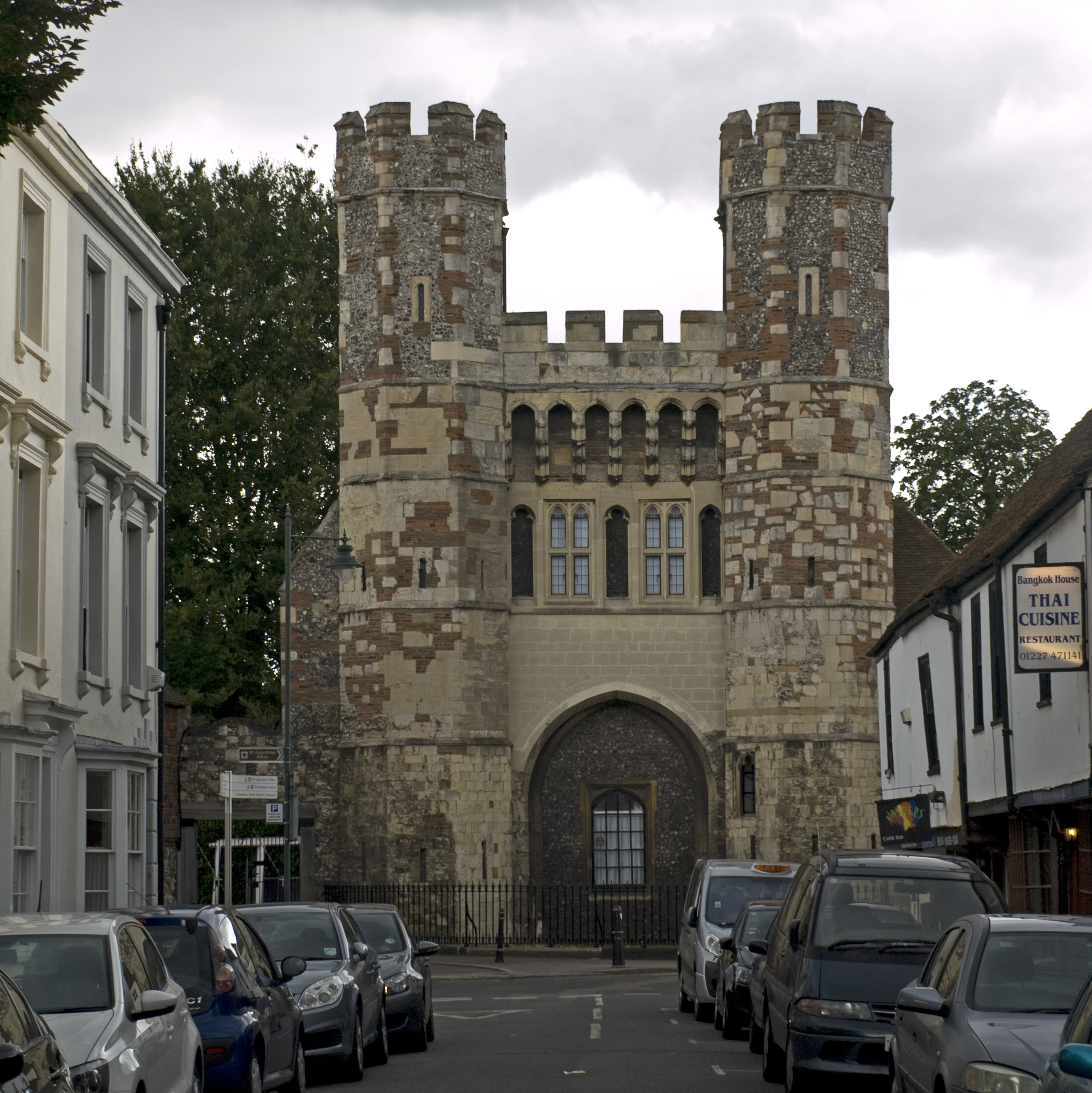
The Cemetery Gate, built in the 14th century.

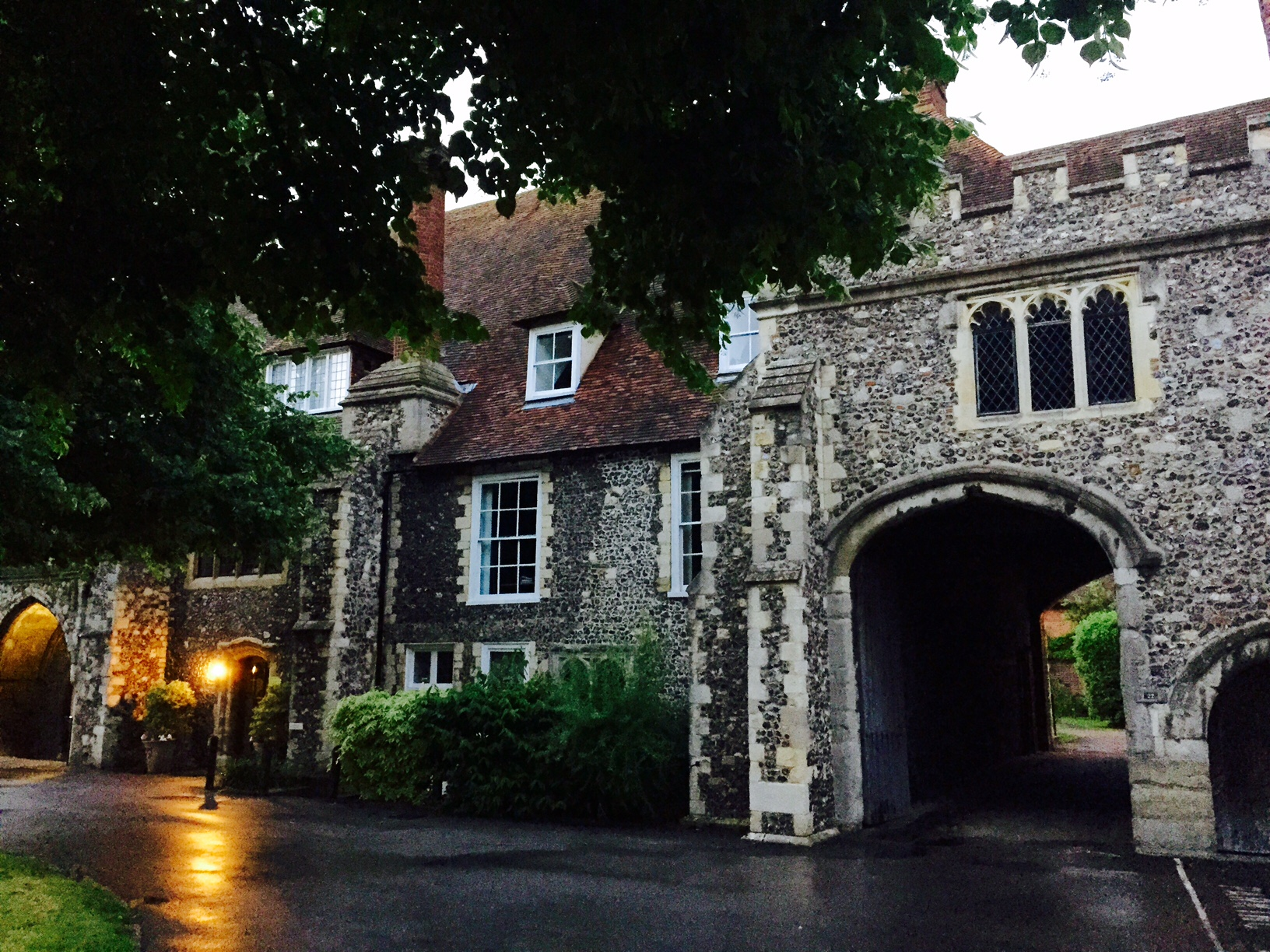
The Priory block, built around 1100 as part of the medieval priory. It was acquired by King's in 1936.

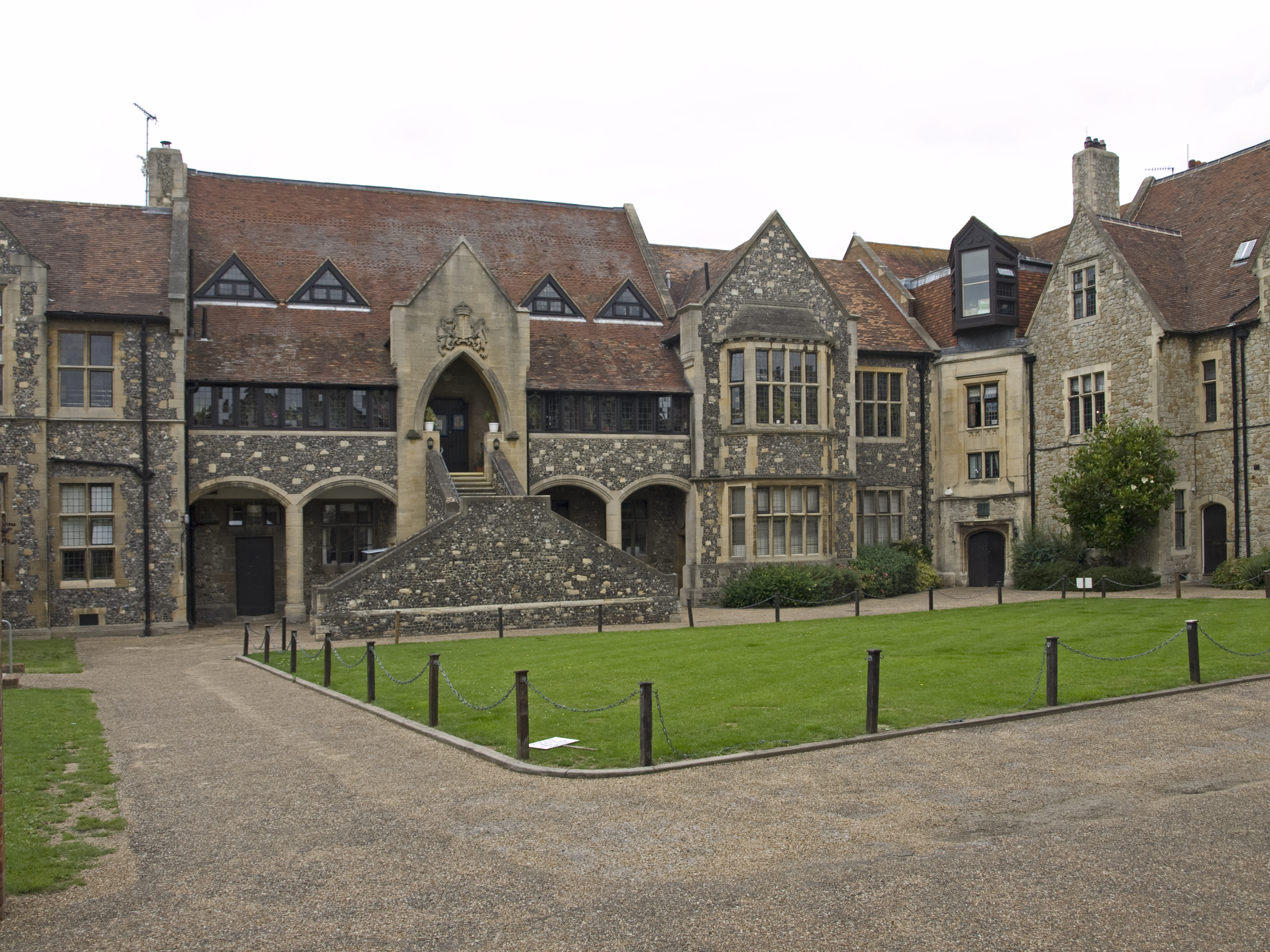
The inner of Mint Yard, with the Parry Block in the centre, built in 1881

The King's School spans multiple sites in Canterbury, most notably the precincts of Canterbury Cathedral and the former St Augustine's Abbey. The school has numerous listed buildings with architectural styles such as: Norman, English Gothic, and Georgian. Among the architects who designed the buildings are William Butterfield and Seely & Paget. The oldest surviving of the school's buildings are a large Norman gatehouse, hall and staircase that date to around AD 1060, constructed to accommodate pilgrims and visitors for cathedral priory that once stood there. A monastic bakery, granary, and brewery from this period also survive.

In the grounds of the former abbey stands two gates, Fyndon's Gate and Cemetery Gate, both of which date to the 14th century, and were built in an English Decorated Gothic style. The college buildings attached to the gate were built in 1848 by William Butterfield for a short-lived missionary college, St Augustine's College. Acquired by the school in 1992, it now uses the site for boarding houses, a library, and 2 chapels. Within the city, the school owns part of a 13th-century friary, endowed by the late Donald Beerling and the Cantiacorum Trust.

The school also owns the Old Synagogue at Canterbury. It is considered one of the finest buildings of the 19th century Egyptian Revival style.

In 2023, King’s appointed Walter and Cohen architects to design the Rausing Science Centre. It features 6 science classrooms and a lecture theatre that accommodates 120 people. Its facade primarily consists of knapped flint wall and oak-framed glass windows. It was a regional finalist in the Civic Trust Awards as well as a shortlisted entry in the Education Property Awards: School Project of the Year.

== Coat of Arms ==
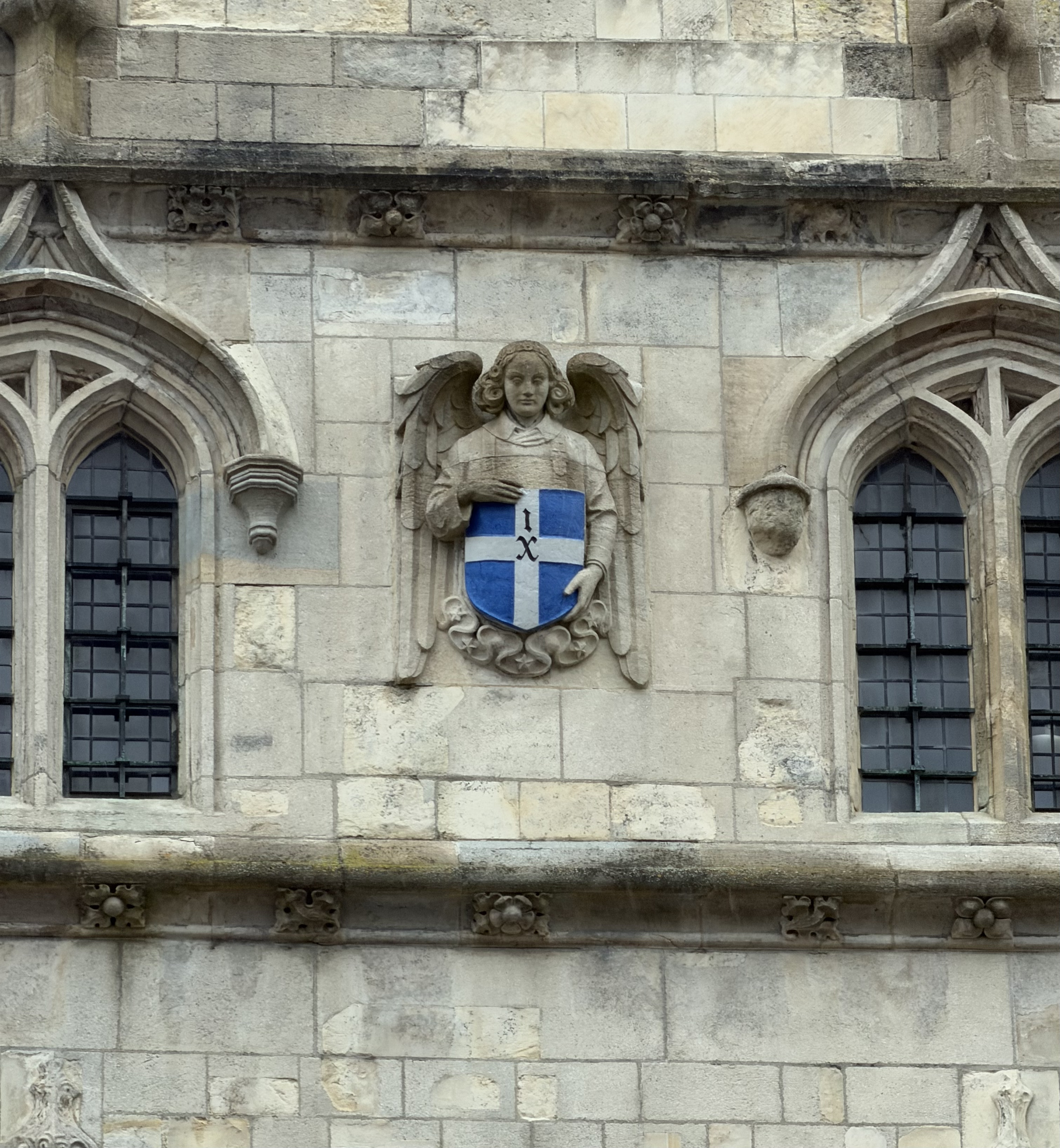
The school arms seen on Christchurch Gate

The King's School's coat of arms is based on that of the Chapter of Canterbury Cathedral. It features a blue field with a white cross bearing the letters I and X (Iota, Chi). It is often interpreted as a christogram composed of the first letters for the Greek words Jesus (Iesous) and Christ (Christos).

According to Thomas Willement however, it is instead an abbreviation of 'Christi' as the lower case iota is used in certain versions of the arms. It was first documented by the College of Arms in 1619 during a visit to Kent under the heading "Canterbury: Dean & Chapter". The school probably adopted the arms during the 1840s.

The blazon is as follows: Azure, on a cross argent the letters I and X in pale sable.

== Academic results ==
In 2026, 51% of pupils scored A*-A for their A levels examinations, with 81% achieving A*-B and at GCSE level, 54% scored 9-8 and 74% at 9-7 .

== Houses ==
There are 17 houses at King's, 13 boarding and 4 day. Most are named after past headmasters or people of interest in the school's history, with the exception of School House, The Grange and Carlyon. The houses are listed below with founding dates:

=== Boarding Houses (boys) ===
- School House - 1860
- The Grange - 1928: Moved to a new building in 2007
- Meister Omers -1936: The building dates to the 15th century, built as a cathedral guest house
- Galpin's - 1952: Named after The Reverend Arthur Galpin, Headmaster from 1897 to 1910
- Linacre - 1953: Named after Thomas Linacre, founder of the Royal College of Physicians
- Tradescant - 1976: Named after John Tradescant (KS 1619–23), the distinguished gardener and collector

=== Boarding Houses (girls) ===
- Walpole - 1935: Named after the novelist Sir Hugh Walpole (KS 1896–98)
- Luxmoore - 1945: Named after Sir Arthur Fairfax Coryndon Luxmoore (KS 1889–93), Lord Justice of Appeal
- Broughton - 1976: Named after William Broughton (KS 1797–1804), the first Bishop of Australia
- Jervis - 1992: Named after Douglas Jervis OKS
- Harvey - 1996: Named after William Harvey physician, who first determined the systemic circulation of the blood (KS 1588–92)
- Bailey - 1990: (sixth form girls boarding) Named after Henry Bailey, second warden of St Augustine's College between 1850 and 1875 and an honorary Canon of the Cathedral
- Kingsdown - 2015: Named after Lady Kingsdown, Governor Emerita

=== Day Houses (mixed) ===
- Marlowe - 1936: Named after the poet and dramatist Christopher Marlowe (KS 1579–81)
- Mitchinson's - 1982: Named after John Mitchinson, Headmaster 1859–73 and co-founder of the Headmasters' Conference
- Carlyon - 2005: Named after evacuation of the School to Carlyon Bay in Cornwall during the Second World War
- Morpurgo House - 2025: Named after Sir Michael Morpurgo OKS. The building dates to the 16th century, originally serving as a dining hall to the (now ruined) cathedral infirmary.

== Traditions ==
=== King's Week ===
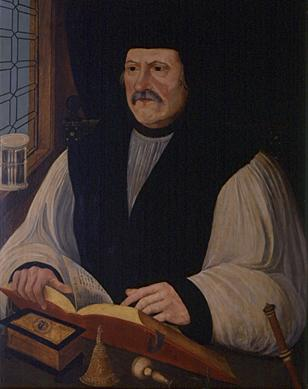
Matthew Parker, an important benefactor of the school

A festival of arts, held during the last week of the summer term was introduced by Fred Shirley in 1952. The week features over 100 events, ranging from classical concerts to theatrical performances held in locations around Canterbury. Events have been free to attend, and a number are broadcast live.

The week culminates with Commemoration Day (known as "Commem") on the last day of the school year. On this day, the school leavers in 6a wear "Court Dress" of white tie and tails with breeches and black stockings, or their national dress. The whole school attends a service to commemorate the school benefactors, opening with a prayer as follows: “the advantages afforded in this place by the munificence of founders and benefactors”. 42 benefactors are remembered by name.

Such benefactors include the school's founder St Augustine of Canterbury, and notable figures including Thomas Cranmer, who was responsible for the re-founding of the school, and Matthew Parker, who established scholarships for King's pupils to Corpus Christi College, Cambridge.

=== King's Scholars ===
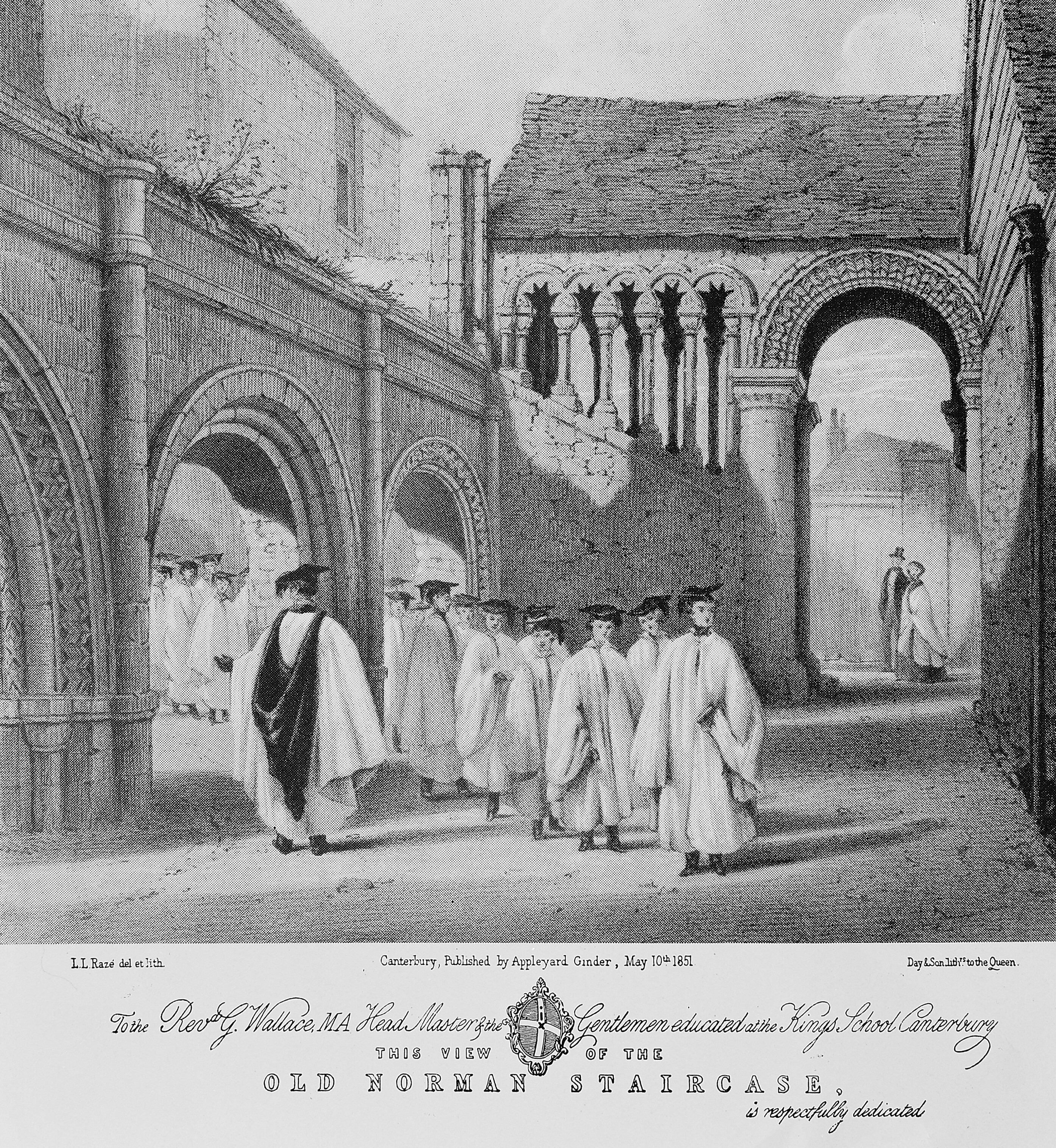
King's pupils (1861)

An academically-select group who must take the scholarship examinations prior to entry at the age of 12 to 14 (Exhibitioners may also be elected) or, in the case of honorary scholars, achieve exceptional GCSE (9 A*s is usually the minimum) or AS Level results.

King's Scholars are admitted by the dean at the beginning of every school term; the scholars kneeling before the dean, who then touches their head and utters "Admitto Te", formally acknowledging them as a King's Scholar. Scholars process wearing surplices during school services in the Cathedral, and in the Upper Sixth are permitted to wear a black gown.

=== Purples ===
Until recently called "monitors", these are the school prefects, who are marked out by their distinctive purple gowns. Only those in the highest year at the school may be a purple. Each house generally has one purple (the Head of House). The purples are headed by the Captain of School and a Vice-Captain. A head scholar and two Vice-head scholars are also invited to become Purples.

=== Full Canterbury Dress ===
The name given to the school uniform, which consists of a white shirt with wing collar, black waistcoat, pinstripe trousers, black jacket, black socks, black tie and black shoes for the boys. Girls wear a white blouse, brooch, pinstripe skirt or trousers, black jacket, black tights and black shoes. When he came to the School, Fred Shirley, Headmaster (1935–1962), updated the school uniform to sports jackets but within a year, the boys had asked to revert to their traditional garb. He tried again after the War when the School returned to Canterbury, this time taking a vote on the matter but despite the difficulty in finding outmoded clothing in a time of clothes rationing, the boys once again decided to revert to tradition. In the mid-twentieth century, there were elaborate customs relating to such matters as buttons and the angle at which a boater was worn. The girls' version was introduced by Anthony Phillips, Headmaster.

=== Year group naming ===
Year 9 / 3rd form is known as the "Shell" year, while year 10 / 4th form is known as the "Remove". The "Shell" name originates from Westminster School, where students were taught in an apse like alcove in the School Hall that resembled the look of a shell, hence its name. The "Remove" name originates from the year where students would spend an additional year preparing for examinations.

== Office of Fair Trading investigation ==
In 2005, the Office of Fair Trading (OFT) provisionally found that the school exchanged detailed information about prospective fee increases with approximately 50 other prominent UK independent schools, including Eton and Sevenoaks. The OFT stated that "regular and systematic exchange of confidential information as to intended fee increases was anti-competitive and resulted in parents being charged higher fees than would otherwise have been the case."

== Staffing ==
Peter Roberts retired as Headmaster at the close of the Summer Term on Thursday, 7 July 2022. Elizabeth Worthington, Senior Deputy Head, was the interim head until September 2023, when Jude Lowson became the first female Head in the history of the School.

== Notable headmasters ==
- 1525–1560: John Twyne
- 1935–1962: Fred Shirley
- 1975–1986: Peter Pilkington, later Lord Pilkington of Oxenford

== The Junior King's School, Canterbury ==
The King's School has a feeder preparatory school, the Junior King's School (JKS), previously Milner Court Preparatory School. The school is a coeducational boarding and day establishment and currently has around 350 pupils aged 3 to 13. Whilst there are boarding facilities available, the majority are day pupils. JKS is now located at Milner Court in Sturry, having been originally based in the crypt of Canterbury Cathedral.

The current site was donated by Lady Milner following the death of Alfred Milner, 1st Viscount Milner in 1925. The buildings on site were opened by Rudyard Kipling in 1929, in his capacity as a close friend of Alfred Milner. Wilfrid Oldaker was headmaster from 1945 to 1956 and was the last head to occupy the manor house as the headmaster's residence. Further extensions include a sports hall (1999), a CDT block (1991) and a new music department (2016).

== The International College ==
The King's School has a feeder school for students whom English is an additional language for pupils aged 13-17.

In early 2016, King’s appointed Walter and Cohen architects to conduct a feasibility study of a 1.25-hectare building area, which after the approval of the planning committee of the City of Canterbury in March 2017, led to the planning and construction of the International College, a theatre in Malthouse Building, as well as additional staff housing and a new sports ground.

The International College has three storeys; notably, it features a strikingly orange Corten weathering steel cladding, a homage to the adjacent Malthouse building. The building has won numerous awards:

- 2021 RIBA South East Award
- 2021 RIBA National Awards
- 2021 Canterbury Society Design Awards: New Building in a Conservation Area
- 2021 Canterbury Society Design Awards: Overall Winner (jointly awarded with the Malthouse)
- 2022 Civic Trust Awards – highly commended

== See also ==
- List of the oldest schools in the United Kingdom
- List of the oldest schools in the world
