= Archdeacon of Huntingdon and Wisbech =

Church of England ecclesiastical office

The Archdeacon of Huntingdon and Wisbech is a senior ecclesiastical officer in the Diocese of Ely. The archdeacon is responsible for some clergy discipline and pastoral care in the Archdeaconry of Huntingdon and Wisbech.

== History ==
The Archdeaconry of Huntingdon was a part of the Diocese of Lincoln from (at the latest) the early 12th century. As such it is the oldest continually occupied Archdeaconry in England. The archdeaconry was moved to Ely diocese by Order in Council on 30 May 1837. The archdeaconry of Wisbech was created from several deaneries not already in an archdeaconry, by Order in Council on 5 February 1915. c. 2004–2005, appointments to the Wisbech archdeaconry ceased and Huntingdon archdeaconry was renamed to the present Archdeaconry of Huntingdon and Wisbech.

== List of archdeacons ==
=== High Medieval ===
- bef. 1092–1110 (d.): Nicholas (Archdeacon of Cambridge, Huntingdon and Hertford; also called archdeacon of Lincoln)
- bef. 1123–aft. 1156: Henry of Huntingdon
- bef. 1166–aft. 1160: Hugh (disputed)
- bef. 1166–bef. 1187: Nicholas de Sigillo
- bef. 1192–aft. 1204: Robert de Hardres
- bef. 1206–bef. 1214 (res.): William de Cornhill
- bef. 1214–aft. 1223 (res.): Robert de Hailes/of Hailes
- bef. 1223–bef. 1228: Philip de Fauconberg
- bef. 1230–bef. 1239: Gilbert de Tantone
- bef. 1240–aft. 1245: William de Arundel
- bef. 1246–?: T.
- bef. 1247–aft. 1253: Robert de Hicche
- bef. 1255–aft. 1254: R. (disputed)
- bef. 1256–aft. 1275: Roger of Raveningham
- bef. 1277–aft. 1282: William of Newark
- bef. 1287–c. 1295: Roger Martival
- 15 March 1295–? (dep.): John de Colonna (papal provision reversed after collation)
- 26 December 1295–bef. 1308 (d.): Walter Wutton/of Wootton

=== Late Medieval ===
- 22 May 1308–bef. 1309 (d.): Arnald de le Breto
- 14 August 1309–bef. 1318 (deprived): Guicard de le Breto (deprived for plurality)
- 1318–1327 (res.): James Berkeley
- 1329–bef. 1337 (d.): Richard Brinchesle
- 4 July 1337 – 1361 (res.): William Whittlesey
- 1344: Pedro Cardinal Gòmez de Barroso (ineffective provision; cardinal-bishop of Sabina)
- 16 October–October 1361 (d.): Fortanerius Vassalli OFM, Patriarch of Grado
- aft. 1362–?: John Swynle/Swynlegh
- May 1386: John Lincoln of Grimsby (probably ineffective royal grant)
- 1386–24 February 1394 (exch.): William Welborne
- 24 February 1394–aft. 1413: Eudo Zouche/la Zouche
- 24 March–22 July 1414 (d.): John Tibbay
- 26 July 1414–bef. 1421 (res.): Richard Hethe
- 15 December 1421–?: William Lassells
- bef. 1447–bef. 1462 (d.): Richard Morsby
- 20 February 1462–bef. 1464 (d.): Richard Hayman
- 25 September 1464–March 1475 (d.): Vincent Clement
- 27 March 1475 – 1478 (res.): John Morton
- 13 June 1478 – 1493 (res.): John Blyth
- 17 February–28 July 1494 (res.): Thomas Hutton
- 28 July 1494–bef. 1496: Robert Sherborne
- 5 March 1496–bef. April 1496 (res.): Christopher Urswick
- 28 April 1496 – 1502 (res.): William Warham
- 10 July 1502–bef. 1512 (d.): John Foster
- 1 December 1512 – 1514 (res.): John Constable
- 3 June 1514–bef. November 1514 (res.): William Atwater
- 18 November 1514 – 1523 (res.): Richard Rawlins
- 12 September 1523 – 1541 (res.): William Knight

=== Early modern ===
- 5 April 1542–July 1543 (d.): Richard Gwent
- 27 July 1543–bef. 1560 (deprived): Anthony Draycot (deprived)
- 28 September 1560 – 1567 (d.): Robert Beaumont
- 25 December 1567–bef. 1576 (res.): John Bullingham
- 29 October 1576–bef. 1612 (d.): Robert Condall
- 23 August 1612–bef. 1615 (d.): Nathan Gifford
- 1 December 1615 – 1621 (res.): William Laud
- 26 April 1622–June 1633 (d.): Owen Gwyn
- 12 January 1634 – 22 August 1649 (d.): Richard Holdsworth
- 19 November 1649 – 18 March 1665 (res.): Peter Mews
- 18 March 1666 – 4 March 1667 (d.): William Johnson
- 27 April 1667–bef. 1669 (d.): Henry Downhall
- 29 March 1670–bef. 1673 (d.): Richard Perrinchief
- 5 September 1673 – 14 May 1701 (res.): John Hammond
- 15 May 1701 – 1720 (res.): White Kennett (also Bishop of Peterborough from 1718)
- 15 April 1721–bef. 1725 (res.): John Sturges
- 12 August 1725 – 17 March 1747 (d.): William Lunn
- 28 March 1747 – 3 February 1757 (d.): Timothy Neve
- 22 April 1757 – 31 January 1770 (d.): Charles Jenner
- 23 February 1770 – 8 September 1773 (d.): Nicholas Cholwell
- 1 January 1774 – 22 February 1794 (d.): Michael Tyson
- 16 April 1794 – 1812 (res.): Thomas Parkinson
- 4 April 1812 – 1814 (res.): Thomas Middleton
- 5 July 1814 – 5 February 1828 (d.): James Hook
- 25 February 1828 – 9 February 1856 (d.): John Banks Hollingworth

On 30 May 1837, the archdeaconry was moved from Lincoln diocese to the Diocese of Ely.

- 22 March 1856 – 16 March 1870 (res.): The Hon Henry Yorke

=== Late modern ===
- 1870–1874 (res.): Francis McDougall
- 1874–18 March 1915 (d.): Gerald Vesey
- 1915–28 September 1921 (d.): Thomas Hodgson
- 1921–1943 (ret.): Kenneth Knowles (afterwards archdeacon emeritus)
- 1943–1947 (res.): William Uthwatt (afterwards archdeacon emeritus)
- 1947–1955 (ret.): James Jones
- 1954–1965 (ret.): Arthur Royle
- 1965–1975 (res.): Dennis Page
- 1975–1977 (res.): David Young
- 1978–1996 (ret.): Richard Sledge
- 1997–2004 (res.): John Beer (also {acting?} Archdeacon of Wisbech from 2003)

c. 2004–2005, the archdeaconry was renamed from Huntingdon to Huntingdon and Wisbech.

- 2005 – April 2022 (ret.): Hugh McCurdy
- 25 September 2022 – present: Richard Harlow

== Archdeacons of Wisbech ==
Wisbech was a separate archdeaconry from 1915 until 2004.

- 1915–6 January 1916 (d.): Colin Campbell
- 1916–1923 (res.): James Srawley
- 1924–1945 (res.): George Ward
- 1945–1953 (res.): Seiriol Evans
- 1953–1964 (res.): John Pelloe
- 1965–6 November 1978 (d.): George Fox
- 1979–1984 (res.): William Patterson
- 1984–1993 (res.): David Fleming
- 1995–December 2002 (ret.): Jim Rone
- 2003–2004 (res.): John Beer (Acting?)

c. 2004–2005, the archdeaconry lapsed or ceased.

== Sources ==
- Greenway, Diana E. (1977), Fasti Ecclesiae Anglicanae 1066–1300, vol. 3, pp. 26–30
- King, H.P.F. (1962), Fasti Ecclesiae Anglicanae 1300–1541, vol. 1, pp. 8–10
- Horn, Joyce M.; Smith, David M. (1999), Fasti Ecclesiae Anglicanae 1541–1857, vol. 9, pp. 16–18
- Horn, Joyce M. (1992), Fasti Ecclesiae Anglicanae 1541–1857, vol. 7, pp. 14–15
