= John Hammond =

John Hammond may refer to:

== Arts and entertainment ==
- John Henry Hammond (1910–1987), American record producer
- John P. Hammond (1942–2026), American blues guitarist, son of the record producer
- John A. Hammond (1843–1939), Canadian painter
- John Hammond (actor) (born 1955), lead actor in The Blue and the Gray miniseries (1982)
- John Hammond, film character in 31 North 62 East
- John Hammond (Jurassic Park), a fictional character in the Jurassic Park series

== Politics ==
- John Hannam (died 1559), aka John Hammond
- John Hammond (died 1589) (1542–1589), MP for Rye and West Looe
- John Hammond (Irish politician) (1842–1907), Irish politician, MP for County Carlow
- John Hammond (New York politician) (1827–1889), New York manufacturer and politician
- John Hammond (Wisconsin politician) (1814–1898), Wisconsin farmer and politician
- John Wilkes Hammond (1837–1922), American jurist

== Sports ==
- John Hammond (bobsleigh) (1932–1994), British Olympic bobsledder
- John Hammond (cricketer) (1769–1844), English cricketer
- Johnny Hammond (rugby union) (1860–1907), British rugby
- John Hammond (Canadian football) (1923–1999), Canadian Football League player
- John S. Hammond (1880–1939), American sport administrator
- John Hammond (basketball) (born 1954), American sport business manager
- John Hammond (racehorse trainer) (born 1960), British horse trainer
- Jack Hammond (footballer) (1884–1971), Australian rules footballer

== Other ==
- John Hays Hammond (1855–1936), American mining engineer
  - SS John H. Hammond, a Liberty ship
- John Hays Hammond Jr. (1888–1965), American electrical engineer
- John Hammond (physiologist) (1889–1964), British physiologist
- John Hammond (weather forecaster) (born 1966), weather forecaster for the BBC
- John Lawrence Hammond (1872–1949), English historical writer
- John Brown Hammond (1856–1938), American activist
- John C. Hammond (1842–1926), lawyer in the Commonwealth of Massachusetts
- John Hammond (priest) (1640–1723), Church of England archdeacon
- John Henry Hammond (Union Army officer) (1833–1890), Union Army officer during the American Civil War

== See also ==
- Jack Hammond (1891–1942), American baseball player
- Jay Hammond (1922–2005), governor of Alaska 1974–1982
- Johnny Hammond (disambiguation)
- John Hammond Jr. (disambiguation)
