= Uthwatt =

Uthwatt is a surname. Notable people with the surname include:

- Augustus Uthwatt, Baron Uthwatt PC, QC (1879–1949), Australian-British judge
- William Uthwatt (1882–1952), priest of the Church of England

== See also ==
- Huthwaite
- Outhwaite (disambiguation)
