= Banco de Bilbao v Sancha =

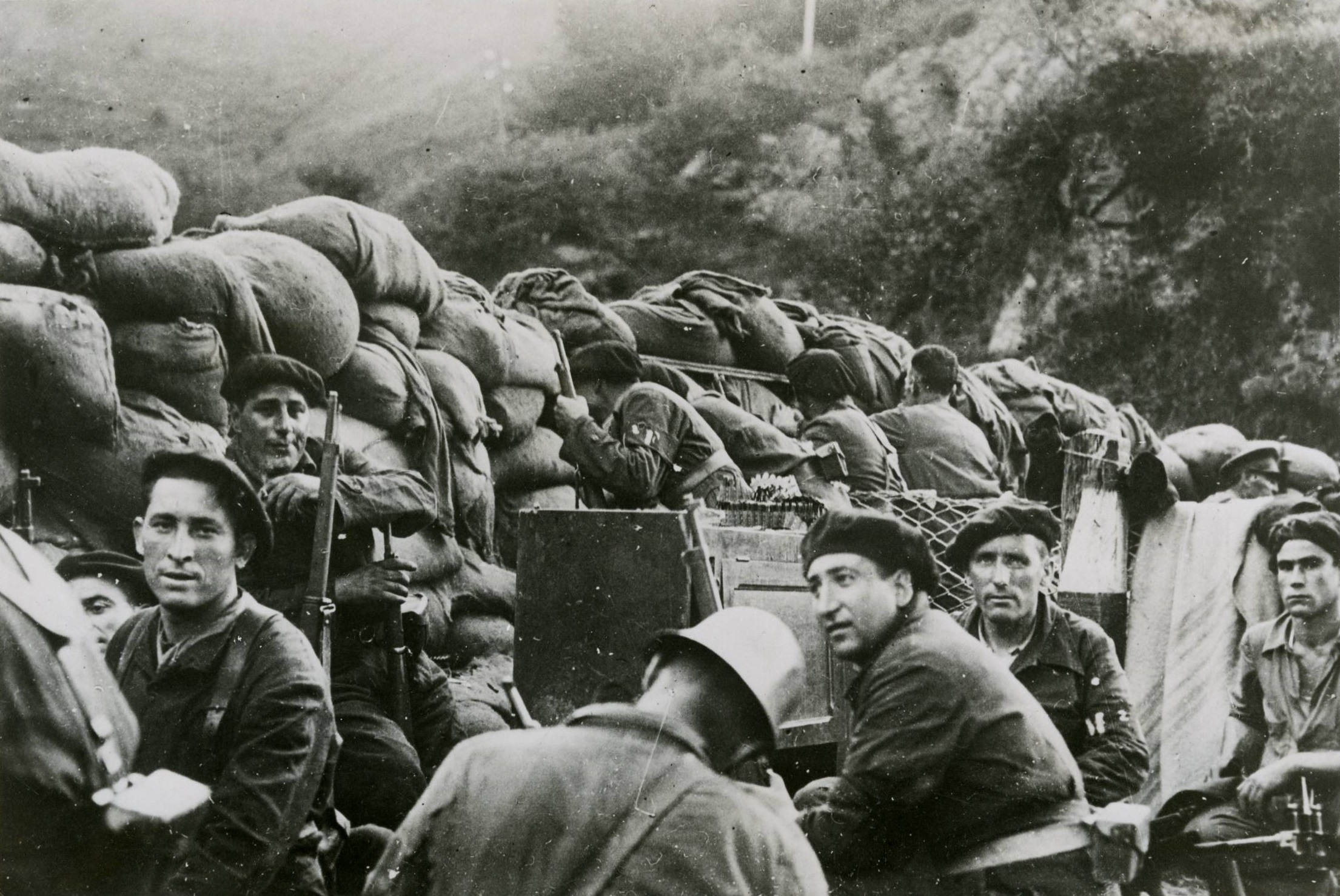
- Spanish Civil War
- Court: Court of Appeal
- Full case name: Banco de Bilbao v Sancha, Banco de Bilbao v Rey
- Decided: 17 March 1938
- Citation: [1938] 2 KB 176

Court membership
- Judges sitting: Greer LJ, MacKinnon LJ and Clauson LJ

Keywords
- conflict of laws; company law; de facto government; agency

Banco de Bilbao v Sancha, Banco de Bilbao v Rey [1938] 2 KB 176 is a judicial decision of the Court of Appeal of England and Wales relating to the conflict of laws and the authority of a party to represent a corporation. The court upheld the general rule that the persons who have authority to represent a corporation are determined by the law of the corporate domicile of the corporation in question.

The dispute arose because of the events of the Spanish Civil War. Although the UK government recognised the Republican forces as the lawful government of Spain, in practice the revolutionary forces under General Franco had de facto control of Bilbao, where Banco de Bilbao was based. The Court accepted that for these purposes the laws passed by the government of General Franco should be treated as the laws which regulate the areas under their control, including Bilbao and Banco de Bilbao.

== Facts ==
The two defendants, Luis Sancha and Antonio Rey, were employees of the Banco de Bilbao at its London branch. In March 1937 Pedro Albisu presented himself at the bank's London branch and asserted he was now the duly accredited representative of the bank in London, and had power to take charge of all the property and affairs of the London branch. The two defendants refused to comply. An action was then commenced in the name of the bank for an injunction to compel Sancha and Rey to comply.

Previously, on 6 October 1936 a law had come into force in the Basque country, in which Bilbao was located, amending the constitution of all banks in the territory, and making provision for the appointments of new boards of directors. Pursuant to this law a new board purported to take office on 5 January 1937. It was this new board which was alleged to have appointed Albisu.

Sancha and Rey disputed the validity of these actions. The law which had been passed was passed by the Revolutionary government of General Franco. General Franco and the revolutionary government were on one side of the Spanish Civil War. The other was the Republican government of Spain. The UK recognised the Republican government as the official government of all of Spain. At the time of the hearing at first instance (before Lewis J) control over Bilbao remained with the Republican government. But by the time the case came before the Court of Appeal, Franco's forces had control of the city.

== Decision ==
=== High Court ===
At first instance Lewis J held that the laws purportedly passed by Franco's government were ineffective as they did not comply with Spain's constitution. The bank appealed

=== Court of Appeal ===
By the time the matter came before the Court of Appeal, Franco's forces had assumed control of Bilbao. The Court of Appeal accepted that they had been in charge of the city since 19 June 1937. It was recognised that Franco's government "exercised de facto administrative control" over the city and most of the Basque region at the time the appeal was heard. Subsequently, on 22 August 1937 the Republican government passed its own decree moving the corporate seat of all banks from Bilbao to either Valencia or Barcelona.

Clauson LJ gave the decision of the Court.

He began his judgment by remonstrating on a matter of procedure. When a legal case involved a dispute as to who was legally in control of one of the parties, then that should normally be disposed of as a preliminary issue. This has not been done in this case, meaning the Court had to proceed on the assumption that Albisu could represent the bank in the proceedings even though that was the very question to be decided.

He then affirmed that "the question of what body of directors have the legal right of representing the Banco de Bilbao ... must depend in the first place on the articles under which it is constituted." and that the proper interpretation and operation of those articles was a matter for the law prevailing in the domicilio social (or corporate home) of the bank.

The question then was which laws governed Bilbao, as the corporate home of the bank. He noted that the UK government recognised the Republican government of Spain as the lawful government, but that "the insurgent Government of General Franco as the Government de facto of the area in which Bilbao is situate." He then applied the rule in Luther v Sagor [1921] 3 KB 532 that the acts of a government which has de facto control of an area cannot be dismissed as the acts of a usurping government. Similarly, the court must treat the acts of the Republican government as a mere nullity in that area because they can exercise no de facto control.

The court also referred to various notarial documents presented by Albisu as proof of his authority. The court dismissed these as they were merely statements by the notary that a person had appeared before them and asserted that a resolution had been passed granting Albisu authority. There was no separate documentation to prove that, and saying something before a notary does not make it more probative than saying the same thing to the court.

=== Outcome ===
Despite ruling in their favour on the matter of law, the Court dismissed the appeal on the grounds that the bank had failed to prove their case.

== Authority ==
The case has been cited with approval on numerous occasions, including by the House of Lords and the Supreme Court, and is generally accepted as correct as a statement of the law.
