= Hugh McCurdy =

Hugh Kyle McCurdy (born 9 March 1958) is a retired priest in the Church of England who served as Archdeacon of Huntingdon and Wisbech

McCurdy was educated at Portsmouth Polytechnic and the University of Wales. He was ordained after a period of study at Trinity College, Bristol in 1986. He fathered three children alongside his wife, Ruth McCurdy. He became a curate at StJohn's, Egham and then St John's, Woking. After this he became the Vicar of St Andrew's, Histon. In 1994 he became Rural Dean of Stowe and in 1998 also Priest-in-Charge of Impington. In 2004 he was made Honorary Canon of Ely Cathedral. He was appointed Archdeacon of Huntingdon and Wisbech in 2005.

In 2010 he was elected to the General Synod. He regularly travelled to visit churches across Africa, such as in Rwanda and other developing countries. He was awarded the Canterbury Cross in June 2020 and retired effective 18 April 2022.

Church of England titles
Preceded by John Beer	Archdeacon of Huntingdon and Wisbech; 2005–2022	TBA
