= Rosamond Harding =

English music scholar (1898–1982)

Dr Rosamond Harding
- Born: Rosamond Evelyn Mary Harding; 6 April 1898; Doddington, Cambridgeshire, England, UK
- Died: 6 May 1982 (aged 84); Southwold, Suffolk, England, UK
- Resting place: St Mary Magdalene Churchyard, Madingley, Cambridgeshire
- Education: Newnham College, Cambridge
- Occupations: Music scholar, writer
- Notable work: The Piano-forte: its History Traced to the Great Exhibition of 1851 (1933); An Anatomy of Inspiration (1940)

Rosamond Evelyn Mary Harding (6 April 1898 – 6 May 1982) was an English music scholar, writer, organologist and instrument collector. Her book The Piano-forte: its History Traced to the Great Exhibition of 1851 became the standard work on the subject.

== Life ==
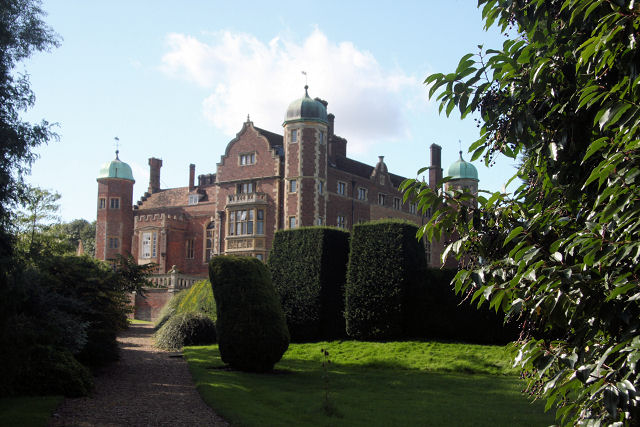
Madingley Hall, Harding's home from 1927 until 1948, viewed from the gardens.

Harding was born in Doddington, Cambridgeshire, the first child of Ambrose, son of Thomas Walter Harding and Adela, daughter of James Audus Hirst, Adel Towers Leeds, Yorkshire. The family were wealthy and lived comfortably. When Rosamund was one year old, the family moved to Histon Manor House, in Histon, north of Cambridge. She was educated at boarding schools and at home, where her father also taught her skills in drawing and illustration. During the First World War, Harding worked at a Chivers and Sons jam factory, and in 1922 began studying music at Newnham College, Cambridge. Disappointed with her grades, she dropped out after her first year.

In 1927, Harding's father inherited Madingley Hall, which became the family home. There, Harding began research for a PhD, under the tutelage of Edward Joseph Dent. Her completed thesis was titled The Piano-forte - its history traced to the Great Industrial Exhibition, 1851. This was subsequently published, but sold a disappointing 93 copies in its first four years. Harding also published the first modern edition of Ludovico Giustini's 1732 work Twelve Sonatas for Pianoforte, the oldest music published specifically for the pianoforte.

During the Second World War, in spite of being a qualified pilot, Harding - like many other women - was rejected for wartime service. Instead, she volunteered as an Air Raid Warden.

Both of Harding's parents died in 1942, during which year she held a research fellowship at Newnham College, and was appointed its director of studies in music. In 1948, the trustees of Madingley Hall sold it to the University of Cambridge, requiring Harding to move. She lived in Icomb, Gloucestershire until 1954, then lived in a series of rentals in Cambridgeshire until settling in Southwold.

Rosamond Harding died in Southwold, Suffolk on 6 May 1982. She was buried in St Mary Magdalene Churchyard, Madingley.

== Works ==
Of The Piano-forte: its History Traced to the Great Exhibition of 1851, Michael Cole wrote:

Anyone who reads Rosamond Harding's history of the pianoforte must be profoundly impressed. Her readiness to explore and report the often bewildering byways of early piano actions; the precision of her technical drawings (which she laboriously executed herself in pen and ink); and the copious appendices with their heavy burden of reference data - such features tell us very quickly that we are engaging with an author with serious aims and high intellectual attainments.

Cole notes that the book remained "unquestionably the standard work on technical development of the pianoforte for at least half a century", and "is still recommended reading for anyone embarking on a piano technician's course... [remaining] a familiar reference work for curators and collectors of old keyboard instruments".

Although sales of her history of the pianoforte were disappointing during her lifetime, Harding's An Anatomy of Inspiration proved very popular, running through multiple editions. Cole calls it "in many ways her most readable and thought provoking book".

According to Maria Popova, in this book Harding set out "to reverse-engineer the mechanisms of creativity through the direct experiences of famous creators across art, science, and literature". Popova writes that:

One particularly interesting notion Harding puts forth is that of “fringe-ideas” – ideas on the periphery of the thinker’s particular inquiry, but resonant in tone and thus able to enhance and flow into the creative process.

She called Harding's book "an invaluable lens on the nooks and crannies of the creative process."

On her death, The Times wrote of Harding that "her substantial and pioneering contribution to the detailed study of the rise of the pianoforte... remains her monument".

== Bibliography ==
- A History of the Piano-Forte. University Press, Cambridge, 1933
- Twelve Piano-Forte Sonatas of L. Giustini di Pistoia (1732). Edited in facsimile with Preface and Notes. University Press, Cambridge, 1933
- Towards a Law of Creative Thought. Kegan Paul, Trench, Trubner & Co., London, 1936
- Origins of Musical Time and Expression. Oxford University Press, London, 1938
- An Anatomy of Inspiration. W. Heffer & Sons Ltd., Cambridge, 1940
- A Thematic Catalogue of the Works of Matthew Locke with a Calendar of the Main Events of his Life. Oxford, 1971
