= Michael Wright (author) =

British journalist and author (born 1966)

Michael Wright (born 1966) is a British journalist, columnist, and author. He is known for a long-running column in The Daily Telegraph and for two memoirs about life in rural France, C’est La Folie (2007) and Je t’aime à la Folie (2011), both published by Bantam.

== Early life and education ==
Michael Wright was born in Surrey in 1966. He was educated at Windlesham House School and Sherborne School before studying English literature at the University of Edinburgh.

== Career ==
After graduating, Wright worked in London as a theatre critic, arts columnist, and literary diarist. He later joined The Daily Telegraph, where he wrote a long-running column covering cultural and lifestyle topics, including expatriate life and rural living in France.

Wright relocated to rural France, where his experiences formed the basis of his later journalism and books. His Telegraph column ran for several years and was later cited in academic work examining British expatriate writing and representations of rural France in UK media.

He has also appeared on BBC Radio 4, including the programme Excess Baggage, discussing travel, memoir, and expatriate life.

In addition to his own work, Wright co-wrote Gardens of Stone, the memoir of Stephen Grady, which recounts Grady's experiences as a teenage member of the French Resistance during the Second World War.

== Books ==
Wright's writing about life in France was later developed into memoir form. His first book, C’est La Folie, published in 2007, describes the renovation of a rural farmhouse and the challenges of adapting to life in the French countryside.

The sequel, Je t’aime à la Folie (2011), continues the narrative, focusing on long-term settlement, relationships, and community life in rural France. The book received independent reviews in expatriate and lifestyle publications.

== Selected works ==
- C’est La Folie: One Englishman, One Year, Twenty Chickens and a Dog Called Dog (London: Bantam Press, 2007). ISBN 978-0553817324
- Je t’aime à la Folie (London: Bantam Press, 2011). ISBN 978-0553819380

== Personal life ==
Wright lives in rural France with his family.
