= 1848 in sports =

1848 in sports describes the year's events in world sport.

== Baseball ==
Events

- First publication of the Knickerbocker rules.

== Boxing ==
Events

- William Thompson retains the Championships of England but there is no record of any fights involving him in 1848.

== Cricket ==
Events

- 18 July — birth in Gloucestershire of W. G. Grace, who will dominate cricket to the end of the 19th century and be hailed as The Great Cricketer

England

- Most runs – George Parr 339 @ 18.83 (HS 52)
- Most wickets – William Hillyer 85 @ 7.28 (BB 8–26)

== Football ==
Events

- According to the recollections of Henry Charles Malden, a set of rules is created for use at the University of Cambridge, drawing features from the different public school games.

== Horse racing ==
England

- Grand National – Chandler
- 1,000 Guineas Stakes – Canezou
- 2,000 Guineas Stakes – Flatcatcher
- The Derby – Surplice
- The Oaks – Cymba
- St. Leger Stakes – Surplice

== Lacrosse ==
Events

- Montreal's Olympic Club plays a match against an indigenous team.

== Rowing ==
The Boat Race

- The Oxford and Cambridge Boat Race is not held this year

Other events

- Henry Clasper builds the first keelless racing boats and spoon shaped oars, and develops the outrigger.
