= Elliot James Dowell Colvin =

Indian politician

- Born: London; 27 July 1885
- Died: 1950
- Military career
- Allegiance: British India
- Branch: Army
- Rank: Lieutenant-Colonel
- Unit: 117th Mahrattas regiment

Lieutenant-Colonel Elliot James Dowell Colvin, CIE (27 July 1885 in London, England – 1950 in Delhi, India) was a British Indian Army and Indian Political Service officer who served as Prime Minister of Jammu and Kashmir.

== Early life and education ==
Colvin was educated at Windlesham House School, Charterhouse and the Royal Military College, Sandhurst. He was commissioned as a second lieutenant in the British Indian Army in January 1904.

== Career ==
Colvin remained on active service with the 117th Mahrattas regiment until July 1908, when he was appointed personal assistant to the Resident, Hyderabad. He was appointed a political officer in the Indian Political Department of the British Raj in February 1912 and promoted agent to the Governor-General in Central India, June 1915. Colvin was appointed political agent, Baghelkhand, in March 1921, and Under-secretary to the agent to the Governor-General in Central India in April 1922.

In February 1924, Colvin was appointed adviser to the Maharaja of Rewa, which was considered "foreign service" by the Indian Political Department; then, in April 1930, was appointed officiating (i.e. acting) Resident, Gwalior, and officiating political agent, Eastern Rajputana States. In the aftermath of communal violence in Kashmir, Hari Singh, the Maharajah, was forced to ask the British Indian government to dispatch troops to the state to quell the rebellion. Lt.-Col. Colvin was chosen as prime minister of Kashmir State in March 1932 and reappointed in March 1935 to give British India more influence in the princely state.

== Later life ==
Colvin was awarded the title of Companion of the Order of the Indian Empire in June 1933. He became Resident to Baroda and the Gujarat States in January 1938, before retiring in July 1940. Colvin retired from the Indian Army with the rank of lieutenant-colonel.
