= Johnny Hammond =

Johnny Hammond may refer to:

- Johnny "Hammond" Smith (1933–1997), American soul and jazz organist
- Johnny Hammond (rugby union) (1860–1907), English rugby union player

== See also ==
- John Hammond (disambiguation)
