= John Beer (priest) =

Anglican priest and Archdeacon of Cambridge

John Stuart Beer (born 15 March 1944) is a priest in the Church of England and former Archdeacon of Cambridge.

Beer was at Roundhay School and Pembroke College, Oxford. After working in advertising with Rowntree's in York he was ordained in 1972. He became a curate at St John the Baptist's Knaresborough and then a fellow and chaplain at Fitzwilliam College, Cambridge. After this he became the Rector of Toft and then the Vicar of Grantchester. He was Archdeacon of Huntingdon from 1997 until his appointment to Ely in 2004. He retired in 2014.

Church of England titles
Preceded by Richard Sledge	Archdeacon of Huntingdon; 1997–2004	Succeeded by Hugh McCurdy
Preceded by Jeffrey Watson	Archdeacon of Cambridge (previously Ely); 2004–2014	Succeeded by Alex Hughes
