= James Jones (priest, born 1881) =

James William Percy Jones (22 April 1881 – 4 December 1980) was a priest of the Church of England. He was the Archdeacon of Huntingdon from 1947 to 1954.

Jones was educated at Oswestry and Pembroke College, Oxford. He was ordained in 1905 and served at Perry Barr, Nassington with Yarwell, Llanfechain and Market Harborough. Later he was Rural Dean of Leightonstone before his Huntingdon appointment.

Church of England titles
Preceded by William Andrewes Uthwatt	Archdeacon of Huntingdon; 1947–1954	Succeeded by Arthur Royle
