= Moses Carter =

- Born: c.1801
- Died: 8 July 1860 (aged 59); Histon, Cambridgeshire, England

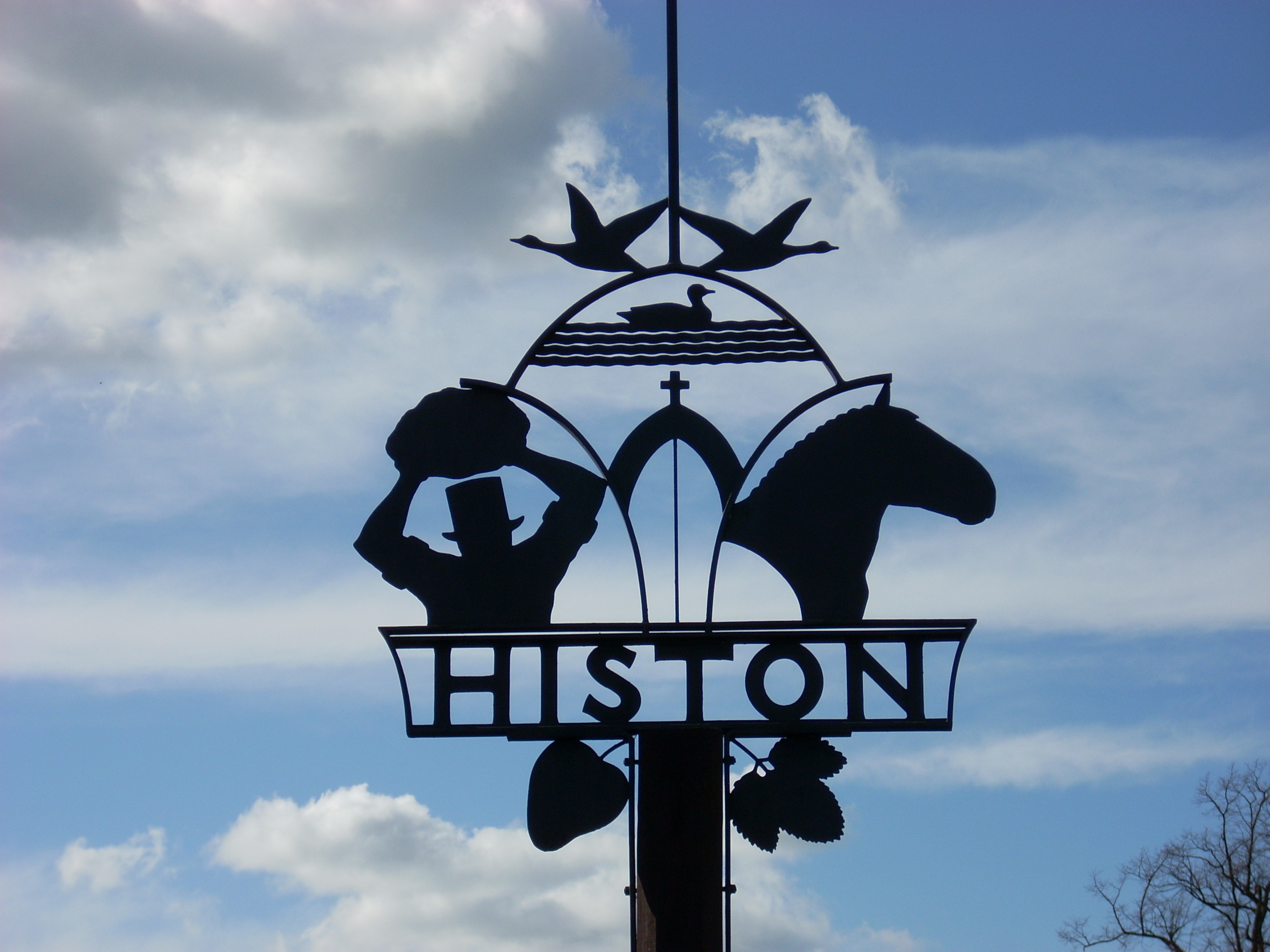
Village sign of Histon featuring Carter carrying a boulder

Moses Carter (c. 1801 – 8 July 1860), known as 'The Histon Giant', was a strongman who lived in the village of Histon, near Cambridge in the United Kingdom.

During his life Carter was famous locally for a number of feats of strength, the best-known today being his carrying of a large boulder from a ballast hole on Park Lane to 'Boot corner'. The stone remains there today, in the garden of The Boot Public House.

In 1998, a memorial to Carter was unveiled at St Andrew's church in the village, on what was the 138th anniversary of his death.

Carter remains well known in the area, and an image of him carrying his boulder features on the village sign. The house in which the Carter family lived still stands in Histon High Street.
