= Christopher Scott-Malden =

English cricketer

Christopher Scott-Maldenk
Personal information
- Full name: Christopher Edward Scott-Malden
- Born: 2 September 1890; Brighton, Sussex, England
- Died: 27 July 1956 (aged 65); Washington, Sussex, England
- Batting: Unknown
- Bowling: Unknown

Domestic team information
- Years: Team
- 1920: Sussex

Career statistics
Competition	First-class
Matches	2
Runs scored	6
Batting average	2.00
100s/50s	–/–
Top score	6
Balls bowled	24
Wickets	–
Bowling average	–
5 wickets in innings	–
10 wickets in match	–
Best bowling	–
Catches/stumpings	–/–
- Source: Cricinfo, 12 February 2012

Christopher Edward Scott-Malden (2 September 1890 – 27 July 1956) was an English cricketer. He was born at Windlesham House School, now based near Washington, Sussex, but then based in Brighton, where his father was headmaster until his death in 1896. He attended the school between 1896 and 1902 under the headship of his mother, Grace Scott Malden (née Gibson).

Scott-Malden's batting and bowling styles are unknown. He made two first-class appearances for Sussex in the 1920 County Championship against Somerset at the Recreation Ground, Bath, and Gloucestershire at Fry's Ground, Bristol. Against Somerset, Scott-Malden was dismissed for 6 runs in Sussex's first-innings by Jack White, while in their second-innings he was dismissed for a duck by Ernie Robson, with the match ending in a Sussex victory by 85 runs. Against Gloucestershire, Scott-Malden was dismissed for a duck in Sussex's first-innings by Tommy Gange. He wasn't required to bat again in Sussex's second-innings, with Sussex winning by 4 wickets.

He became headmaster of Windlesham on his mother's retirement in 1927 and remained in that position until 1953 when he was succeeded by his eldest son, Roger.

Scott-Malden died at Washington, Sussex on 27 July 1956. His second son, Charles, took over the running of the school in 1958 before retiring in 1994 as the last of the Malden headmasters whose tenure had lasted 157 years over five generations.
