= Hubert Thomas Knox =

Irish historian (1846–1921)

Hubert Knox
- Born: Hubert Thomas Knox; 3 November 1846; Enniskerry, County Wicklow
- Died: 2 December 1921 (aged 75); Cheltenham, Gloucestershire
- Occupations: civil servant and historian

Hubert Thomas Knox MRIA FRSAI (3 November 1846 – 2 December 1921) was an Irish historian and civil servant.

Knox was the third surviving son of Charles Knox of Cranmore House, Ballinrobe, who would later be High Sheriff of Mayo in 1860 and was a colonel in the North Mayo Militia. His great-grandfather was James Cuffe, 1st Baron Tyrawley. His mother was Lady Louisa Browne, sister of George Browne, 3rd Marquess of Sligo. His eldest brother, Charles Howe Cuff Knox, was High Sheriff of County Mayo in 1873, colonel of the 3rd battalion of the Connaught Rangers and captain of the 8th Hussars.

He was educated at Windlesham House School and Harrow. He studied law at the Middle Temple beginning in 1863 and was called to the bar in 1868. He served for a time in the Indian Civil Service, at Visakhapatnam, and also in the Nilgiris district.

He wrote several books about Irish history. He was elected a fellow of the Royal Society of Antiquaries of Ireland in 1896.

He died in Cheltenham, four days before the Republic of Ireland gained independence.

== Select bibliography ==
- Knox, H. T. (1900), "The de Burgo Clans of Galway", Journal of the Galway Archaeological and Historical Society, 1 (2)
- Knox, H. T. (1900), "The manor of Admekin (Headford) in the thirteenth century", Journal of the Galway Archaeological and Historical Society, 1 (3)
- Knox, H. T. (1904). Notes on the Early History of the Dioceses of Tuam, Killala and Achonry. Dublin: Hodges and Figgis.
- Knox, H. T. (1908). The History of Mayo to the Close of the Sixteenth Century. Dublin: Hodges, Figgis & Company.
