= Augustus Andrewes Uthwatt, Baron Uthwatt =

Australian-born British judge

The Right Honourable The Lord Uthwatt PC

Lord of Appeal in Ordinary
- In office 9 January 1946 – 24 April 1949
- Preceded by: The Lord Russell of Killowen
- Succeeded by: The Lord Greene; The Viscount Radcliffe

Justice of the High Court
- In office 1941–1946
- Preceded by: Sir Stafford Crossman
- Succeeded by: Sir Ronald Roxburgh

Personal details
- Born: 25 April 1879
- Died: 24 April 1949 (aged 69)
- Education: Trinity College, Melbourne; Oriel College, Oxford

Augustus Andrewes Uthwatt, Baron Uthwatt PC (25 April 1879 – 24 April 1949) was an Australian-born British judge.

== Background ==
Born in Ballarat, Victoria, he was the son of Thomas Andrewes Uthwatt and his wife Annie Hazlitt. He was educated at Ballarat College and the University of Melbourne where he resided at Trinity College from 1896. He was awarded a first-class Bachelor of Arts degree in 1899 and subsequently studied for the Bachelor of Laws (LLB) degree. He went to Balliol College, Oxford in 1901, where he graduated with a Bachelor of Civil Law, receiving the Vinerian Scholarship. He received the highest mark on the BCL despite graduating with second-class honours. After his admission to Gray's Inn in 1901, he was called to the bar three years later and became a bencher in 1927. He was a pupil barrister of Chancery specialist Robert John Parker (later Lord Parker of Waddington).

== Career ==
As he was unable to serve during the First World War, Uthwatt served as legal adviser to the Ministry of Food from 1915 until 1918 and became a member of the Council of Legal Education in 1929. He refused to accept a knighthood for his wartime services. He was junior counsel to HM Treasury, the Board of Trade and the Attorney General for England and Wales in 1934.

Uthwatt was nominated a Judge of the Chancery Division of the High Court of Justice in 1941 and subsequently created a Knight Bachelor.

On 9 January 1946, he was appointed a Lord of Appeal in Ordinary and received thereby additionally a life peerage with the title Baron Uthwatt, of Lathbury, in the County of Buckingham. Following his appointment, he was sworn of the Privy Council in February of the same year. He served as a Lord of Appeal in Ordinary until his death in 1949.

== Family ==
In 1927, he married Mary Baxter Bonhote. They did not have any children of their own, though they did adopt a daughter. In April 1949 Uthwatt died, aged 69, of a heart attack at his home in Sandwich, Kent. His funeral was held at All Saints Church in Lathbury, Buckinghamshire. The service was conducted by his brother, Ven. William Uthwatt (Archdeacon of Huntingdon).

== Notable cases ==
=== As judge ===
- Re Anstead [1943] Ch 161 (administration of estates)
- Perera v Peiris [1949] AC 1 (privilege in libel cases)

== Arms ==
Coat of arms of Augustus Andrewes Uthwatt, Baron Uthwatt
Crest A Stag's Head erased Argent Escutcheon Argent on a Bend cotised Sable three pierced Mullets of the field
