= George Fox (priest) =

British Anglican priest and military chaplain

The Venerable George Fox MC TD
- Archdeacon of Wisbech
- Church: Church of England
- Diocese: Diocese of Ely
- In office: 1964 to 1978

Orders
- Ordination: 1936

Personal details
- Born: Benjamin George Burton Fox; 28 July 1912
- Died: 6 November 1978 (aged 66)
- Denomination: Anglicanism
- Spouse: Margaret Joan Davidson (m. 1943–1978)
- Children: Five
- Education: King Edward VI Grammar School, Norwich; University of London

Benjamin George Burton Fox, MC, TD (28 July 1912 – 6 November 1978) was a British Anglican priest and military chaplain. He was Archdeacon of Wisbech in the Diocese of Ely from 1964 until his death.

== Early life and education ==
Fox was educated at King Edward VI Grammar School, Norwich, a private school in Norwich. He studied at the University of London.

== Ordained ministry ==
Fox was ordained in 1936. He served curacies in Guildford and Bath. After this he was a Chaplain to the Forces during World War II. When peace returned he held incumbencies in Potten End, Bedford, Montego Bay (where he was also the Archdeacon of Cornwall from 1950 to 1955), Fulham and Haddenham.

== Personal life ==
In 1943, Fox married The Honourable Margaret Joan Davidson, daughter of J. C. C. Davidson, 1st Viscount Davidson. Together they had five children; one son and four daughters.

Church of England titles
Preceded by John Parker Pelloe	Archdeacon of Huntingdon and Wisbech; 1964–1978	Succeeded by William James Patterson
