= George Ward (priest) =

English priest (1862–1946)

George Herbert Ward (1862–1946) was Archdeacon of Wisbech from 1924 to 1945.

Ward was educated at Malvern and Hertford College, Oxford and became an Assistant Master at St Paul's School, London. He was ordained Deacon in 1893 and Priest in 1894; and served as Curate of St Matthias, Earl's Court until 1898. He was Headmaster of All Saints’ School, Bloxham from 1898 to 1914 when he became Rector of Hilgay. He was Proctor in Convocation for the Diocese of Ely from 1922 to 1935. He died on 1 May 1946.

== Notes ==
Church of England titles
Preceded by James Herbert Srawley	Archdeacon of Huntingdon and Wisbech; 1924–1945	Succeeded by Seiriol John Arthur Evans
