= Alnod Boger =

English cricketer and barrister

Personal information
- Full name: Alnod John Boger
- Born: 31 August 1871; Stonehouse, Devon, England
- Died: 3 June 1940 (aged 68); Oxford, Oxfordshire, England
- Batting: Right-handed
- Bowling: Right-arm slow

Domestic team information
- Years: Team
- 1891–1892: Oxford University

Career statistics
| Competition | First-class |
|---|---|
| Matches | 6 |
| Runs scored | 143 |
| Batting average | 13.00 |
| 100s/50s | –/– |
| Top score | 41* |
| Balls bowled | 474 |
| Wickets | 9 |
| Bowling average | 25.00 |
| 5 wickets in innings | 1 |
| 10 wickets in match | – |
| Best bowling | 6/63 |
| Catches/stumpings | 1/– |
- Source: Cricinfo, 9 January 2020

Alnod John Boger JP (31 August 1871 – 3 June 1940) was an English first-class cricketer and barrister.

The son of Hext Boger and Blanche Luz Bacon (daughter of Major General Anthony Bacon), he was born in August 1871 at Stonehouse, Devon. He was educated at Windlesham House School and Winchester College, before going up to Magdalen College, Oxford.

While studying at Oxford, Boger made six appearances in first-class cricket for Oxford University in 1891 and 1892. He scored a total of 143 runs in his six matches, at an average of 13.00 and a high score of 41 not out. With his right-arm slow bowling, he took 9 wickets with best figures of 6 for 63, which came against the Marylebone Cricket Club on debut in 1891. He gained a blue in cricket and represented the university in golf in 1893 and 1894. After graduating from Oxford, he was called to the bar as a member of the Inner Temple.

Ineligible for active service as the result of losing an eye in a shooting accident, he volunteered as an ambulance driver for the British Red Cross Society at the start of World War I and ended the conflict as a lieutenant in the Royal Naval Volunteer Reserve. He later served as a justice of the peace and was the High Sheriff of Cornwall in 1925.

Boger died at Oxford in June 1940.

== Works ==
- The story of General Bacon: being a short biography of a peninsula and Waterloo veteran. London: Methuen, 1903.
- The road I travelled. Bristol: Arrowsmith, 1936.
