= James Hamilton-Paterson =

British writer (born 1941)

James Hamilton-Paterson FRSL
- Born: 6 November 1941 (age 84); London
- Education: Windlesham House School; Bickley Hall, Kent; King's School, Canterbury; Exeter College, Oxford
- Employer(s): St. Stephen's Hospital; New Statesman

James Hamilton-Paterson FRSL (born 6 November 1941) is a poet and novelist.

He is one of the most reclusive of British literary exiles, dividing his time between Austria, Italy and the Philippines.

== Early life ==
James Hamilton-Paterson was born on 6 November 1941 in London, England. His father was a neurosurgeon who treated the Aga Khan and provided the inspiration for the poem "Disease", for which Hamilton-Paterson was awarded the Newdigate Prize.

He was educated at Windlesham House, Sussex, Bickley Hall, Kent, King's School, Canterbury and Exeter College, Oxford.

Having worked as a hospital orderly at St. Stephen's Hospital between 1966 and 1968, Paterson earned his first break as a writer in 1969, when he began working as a reporter for the New Statesman. This continued until 1974, when he became features editor for Nova magazine.

== Literary career ==
Hamilton-Paterson is generally known as a commentator on the Philippines, where he has lived on and off since 1979. His novel Ghosts of Manila (1994) portrayed the Philippine capital in all its decay and violence and was highly critical of the Marcoses – a view he rescinded with the publication of America's Boy (1998), which sets the Marcos regime into the geopolitical context of the time.

In 1989, Gerontius was published, a reconstruction of a journey made by the composer Sir Edward Elgar along the River Amazon in 1923. Regarded by admirers as being among the best British novels of the 1980s, its poetic language, dreamlike landscapes and lush imaginings won him the Whitbread Award for first novel.

In 1992, he published Seven-Tenths, a far-ranging meditation upon the sea and its meanings. A mixture of art, science, history and philosophy, this book talks about loss and the loss of meaning.

In 2000, he returned to the magazine industry as a science columnist for Das Magazin (Zurich) for two years before becoming a science columnist for Die Weltwoche.

More recently he won acclaim for his Gerald Samper trilogy of novels, Cooking with Fernet Branca (2004), Amazing Disgrace (2006) and Rancid Pansies (2008), as well as his non-fiction book Empire of the Clouds, which details the aviation industry in post-war Britain.

Hamilton-Paterson was elected a Fellow of the Royal Society of Literature in 2023.

== Bibliography ==
=== Poetry ===
- Option Three (1974)
- Dutch Alps (1984)

=== Fiction ===
- The View from Mount Dog (1987)
- Gerontius (1989)
- The Bell Boy (American title: That Time in Malomba) (1990)
- Griefwork (1993)
- Ghosts of Manila (1994)
- The Music (1995)
- Loving Monsters (2002)
- Cooking with Fernet Branca (2004)
- Amazing Disgrace (2006)
- Rancid Pansies (2008)
- Under the Radar: A Novel (2013)

=== Children's fiction ===
- Flight Underground (1969)
- The House in the Waves (1970)
- Hostage (1978)

=== Non-fiction ===
- A very personal war: the story of Cornelius Hawkridge (1971)
- Mummies: Death and Life in Ancient Egypt with Carol Andrews, Collins for British Museum Publications, 1978, ISBN 0-00-195532-2
- Playing with Water (1987)
- Three Miles Down (1990), an account of an underwater search using the Mir submersibles.
- Seven-Tenths: the sea and its thresholds (1992)
- America's Boy (1998)
- Vom Meer (2010)
- Empire of the Clouds: When Britain's Aircraft Ruled the World (2010)
- Marked for Death: The First War in the Air (2015)
- Beethoven's Third Symphony 'The Eroica' (2016)
- Blackbird: The Story of the Lockheed SR-71 Spy Plane (2017)
- What We Have Lost: The Dismantling of Great Britain (2018)
- Trains, Planes, Ships and Cars: The Golden Age 1900-1941 (2020)
- Stuck Monkey: The Deadly Planetary Cost of the Things We Love (2023)
