= Colin Campbell (British priest) =

British religious leader

Colin Arthur Fitzgerald Campbell (17 June 1863 – 6 January 1916) was the inaugural Archdeacon of Wisbech.

Campbell was the tenth child, and sixth son, of Colonel Sir Edward Campbell, 2nd Baronet and Georgiana Charlotte Theophila, second daughter of Sir Theophilus Metcalfe, 4th Bt.

He was educated at Tonbridge School and Clare College, Cambridge. He was a teacher at Spondon School from 1885 to 1889; and Private Secretary to the Governor of South Australia, the Earl of Kintore from 1889 to 1892. He was ordained deacon in 1893 and priest in 1894. After a curacy in Hartlebury he was: Senior Domestic Chaplain to the Archbishop of Canterbury from 1884 to 1886; Private Chaplain to the Lieutenant Governor of the Isle of Man from 1886 to 1893; Rector of Thornham Magna cum Parva from 1895 to 1902; Rector of Street, Somerset from 1902 to 1908; Rector of Worlingworth from 1908 to 1912 (and Rural Dean of Hoxne from 1909 to 1912; and Rector of Feltwell from 1912 until his death.

== Notes ==
Church of England titles
Preceded by Inaugural appointment	Archdeacon of Huntingdon and Wisbech; 1915–1916	Succeeded by James Herbert Srawley
