= Histon =

Village in Cambridgeshire, England

Coordinates: 52.2535°N 0.1042°E

- Location within Cambridgeshire
- Population: 4,655 (2011)
- OS grid reference: TL437637
- District: South Cambridgeshire
- Shire county: Cambridgeshire
- Region: East
- Country: England
- Sovereign state: United Kingdom
- Post town: CAMBRIDGE
- Postcode district: CB24
- Dialling code: 01223
- Police: Cambridgeshire
- Fire: Cambridgeshire
- Ambulance: East of England
- UK Parliament: St Neots and Mid Cambridgeshire

Histon is a village and civil parish in the South Cambridgeshire district, in the county of Cambridgeshire, England. It is immediately north of Cambridge, and is separated from the city by the A14 road which runs east–west. In 2011, the parish had a population of 4,655. Histon forms part of the Cambridge built-up area.

== Toponymy ==
Suggestions for meanings of Histon include: "farmstead of the young warriors" or "landing place". However, the latter of these is unlikely as Histon is situated above the floodline. The likely origin of the name is from the two Saxon/Old English words hyse and tun – hyse meaning "a young man or warrior", and tun meaning "house or farm". The village name has survived as unchanged as possible since the orthographic rules at the writing of the Domesday Book in 1086, when it was recorded as Histone, which demanded an e after an "n" culmination – see Middle English orthography, due to the focus on the downstrokes only in precious ink at the time.

== Early history ==
Some of the trackways that pass through these villages are believed to be prehistoric. Flint tools have been dug up in and around the area and aerial photographs show evidence of ancient settlements including Iron Age and Roman. Pieces of Roman pottery have been found in the area.

The earliest part of Impington to be inhabited is near the junction of Cambridge Road and Arbury Road, where there is a large ancient settlement, thought to have been built by the Ancient Britons. The settlement was taken over by the Romans when they invaded Britain. There are several roads in Impington that are thought to be based on Roman roads. The Parish probably dates from about the sixth century, when a Saxon tribe called the Empings lived there. Over time, dukes have gone off to help prevent the Danes from invading, while William I sorted out an argument over the town (then 'Epintone') between the Norman Sheriff of Cambridge and the Church.

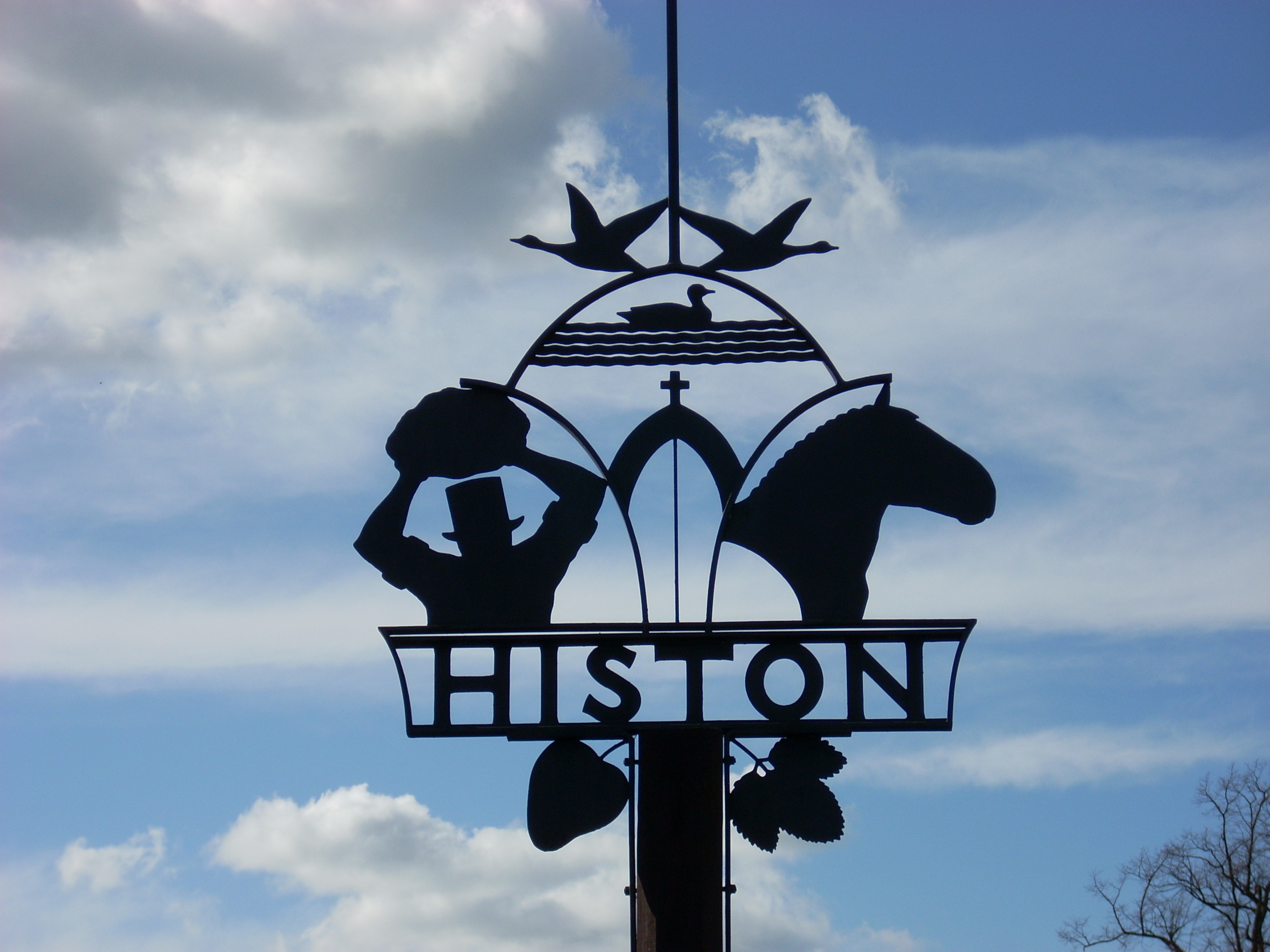
Village sign of Histon, showing Moses Carter at left carrying a boulder

Possibly the oldest surviving area of interest is Gun's Lane, which is named after a family who once lived in the lane. Today this is just a bridleway but it was for centuries the Cambridge to Ely causeway, which was the main road into the Fens and the Isle of Ely. The Iron Age ringfort that once stood at Arbury may well at one time have guarded one end of this road. During the Norman Conquest of England, William the Conqueror passed this way with his army as he chased a rebel Saxon, Hereward the Wake, into the Fens.

Early settlement appears to have been centred around what is now Church End. Originally there were two churches here – St Etheldreda's and St Andrew's – with each church belonging to a separate manor, but only St Andrew's remains today. Before the Reformation these manors were owned by the abbeys of Denny and Eynsham. The Crown sold the manor of St Etheldreda to Sir Thomas Elyot and the manor of St Andrew to Edward Elrington in 1539.

Close by is Histon Manor House, once Histon Hall. Originally it was on a site with a moat which is still visible today, but at some point the house was moved to higher ground nearby, possibly to avoid flooding.

The churches, manor house and grounds prevented expansion to the west so the village slowly moved towards its current centre which is The Green. The Green many times the size it is currently, all of what is today the High Street would have at one time been the green.

Histon was recorded in the Domesday Book as answering for 26 1/2 hides – a hide was recorded in the book as being 120 fiscal acres.

Included on the Histon Village Sign is a man in a stove hat holding a large rock. This represents Moses Carter (1801–1860) a local strongman who lived in the village in the nineteenth century. Carter was alleged to be over seven feet tall, and famously carried a large stone from a building site to The Boot public house. The stone is still in the pub's garden. Carter is affectionately known locally as 'The Histon Giant'.

== The Railway and Chivers factory ==
The Impington Windmill built 1806 and bought by John Chivers in 1904

The opening of the Cambridge & St. Ives Branch by the Eastern Counties Railway Company on 17 August 1847 fuelled the growth of the villages and the expansion of companies within. Stephen Chivers was one of the first to seize the new opportunity that this brought. In 1850 he bought an orchard next to the line giving him access to London and the north of England and in 1870 he sent his sons to open a fruit distribution centre in Bradford. Their customers were mainly jam makers and this was quickly noted by the boys. Following an extra good harvest of fruit in 1873, they got their father to let them make their first jam in a barn off Milton Road, Impington. This proved a successful venture, and within two years the Victoria Works jam factory had opened on the orchard site. By 1895 Chivers had diversified into many other areas including lemonade, marmalade and dessert jellies, and were the first large-scale commercial canners in Europe. By 1939 the company owned most of the large farms and estates in Histon and Impington, Impington windmill and 8,000 acres (32 km^{2}) of land around East Anglia, and the factory employed up to 3,000 people.

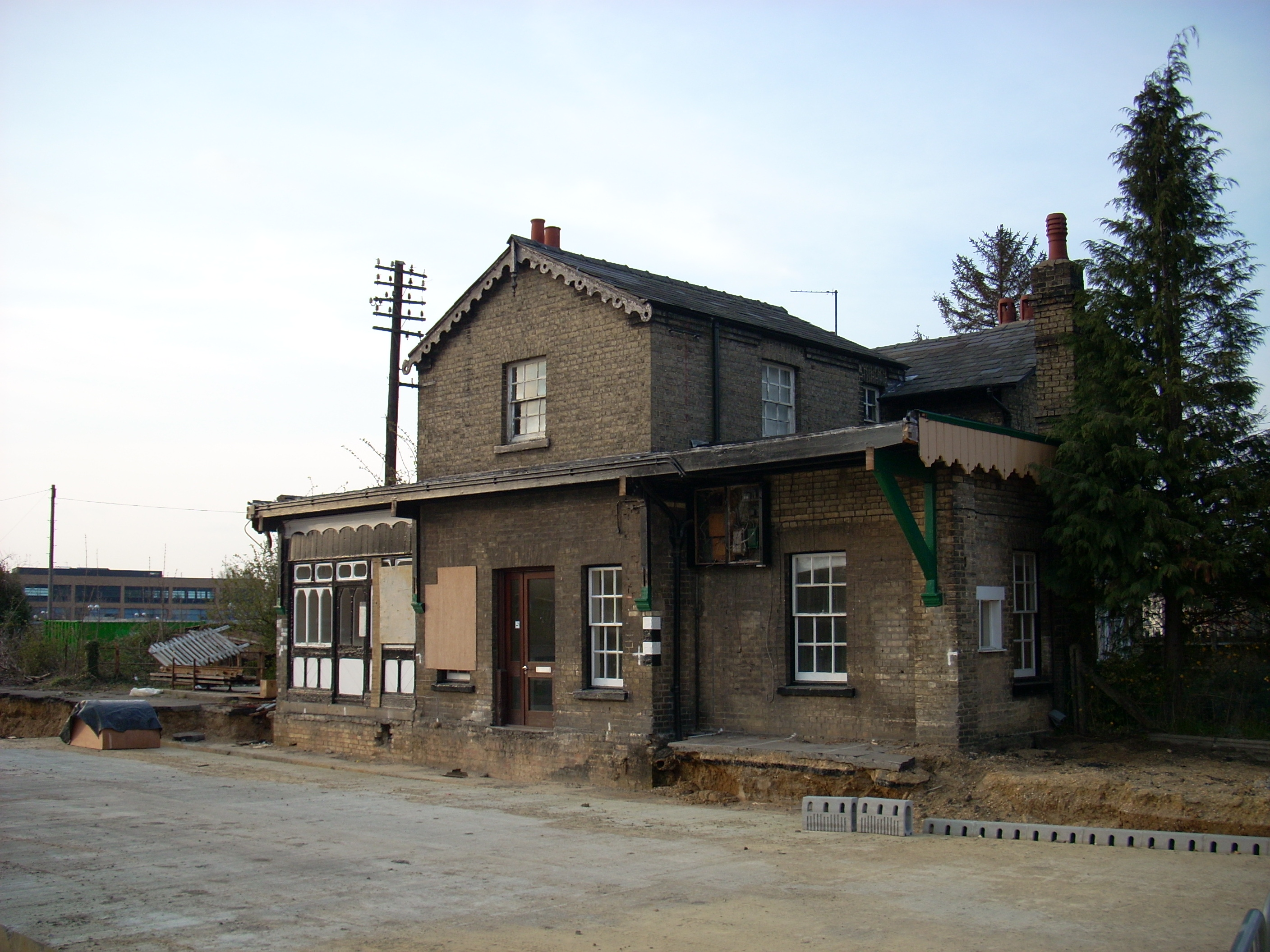
A 2008 photograph of the railway station (now guided busway)

In the 1960s eighty trains a day were scheduled at Histon railway station. This caused many delays for road users and prompted the building of the bridge road bypass, opened by Queen Elizabeth, the Queen Mother in 1963. The road was originally scheduled to be constructed in the 1930s but was delayed because of World War II. However, fewer than ten years after it opened, on 5 October 1970, passenger services were withdrawn from the line, though seasonal deliveries of fruit continued to be delivered by rail to Chivers factory until 1983. The 1980s saw an end to the old factory. In a management buyout the site was sold to developers and a new five million pound factory was built at the rear of the property by new owners Premier Foods. Vision Park, a business park, was built on the old site and all rail services stopped in 1992. Following removal of the rail lines, the route of the railway through Histon and Impington became the route for the Cambridgeshire Guided Busway.

== Churches ==
The villages have five places of worship with six congregations. There are two Anglican churches, both dedicated to Saint Andrew, a Methodist Church, a Baptist Church, and a Salvation Army Church. In addition, a charismatic, evangelical congregation called New Life Church, formed in Easter 2004, now meets on Sunday afternoons in the Baptist Church building. All the congregations work closely together through the Histon and Impington Council of Churches.

=== St Andrew's, Histon ===
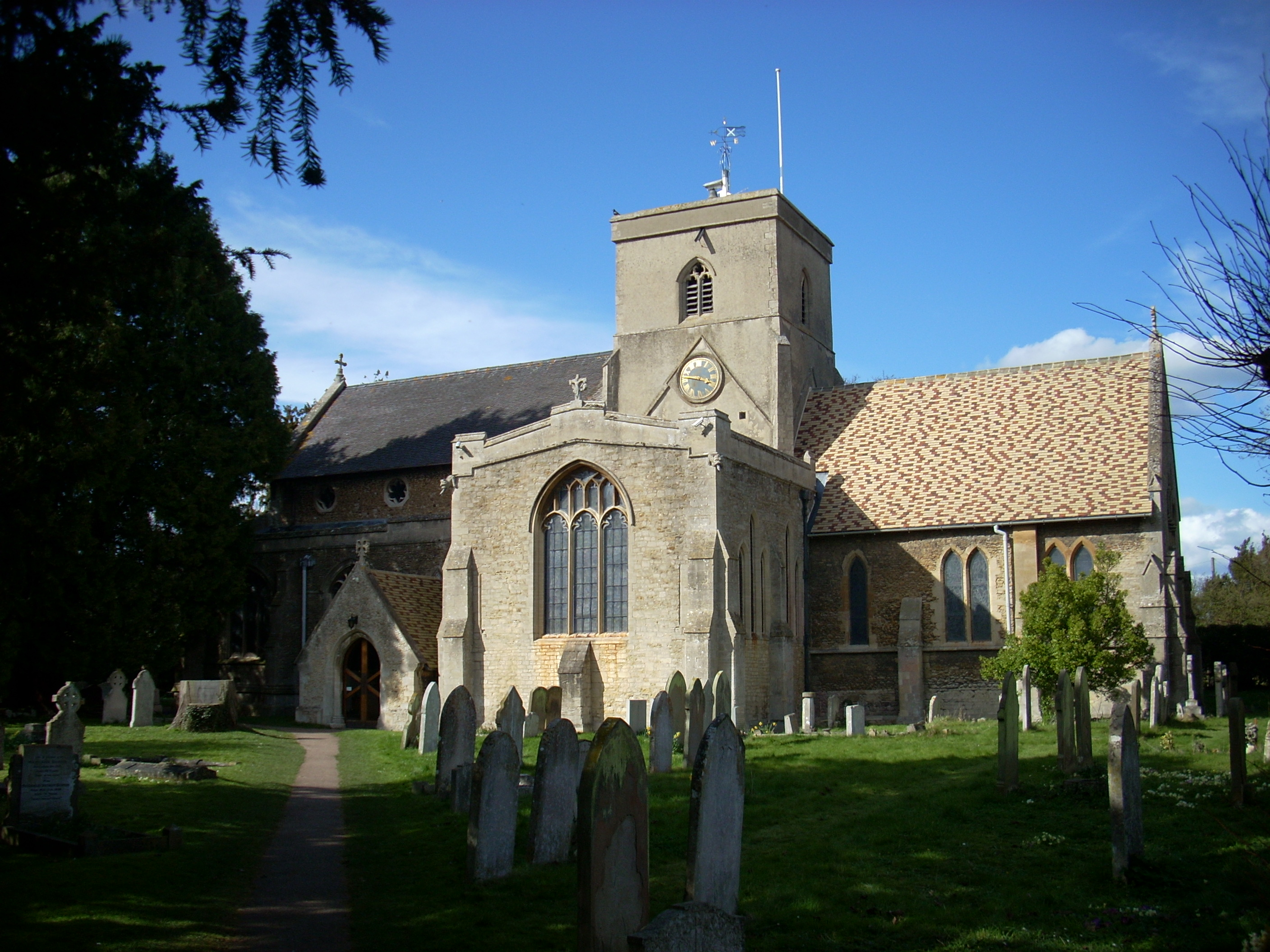
St Andrew's Church, Histon

The first recorded reference to the church was in 1217, but in about 1270 it was modernised, turning it into a cruciform-style church. Much of the building work was carried out in the 13th and 14th centuries, but extensive restoration work and alterations took place in the 19th and 20th centuries. There have been bells in the church since at least 1553; the oldest surviving bell in the tower is dated at 1556 and was made by Austen Bracker of Islington, Norfolk. The bell is listed for preservation by the central council as it is Bracker's only dated bell.

=== Histon Methodist ===
There have been two Methodist chapels in the village. The first was built in 1822 opposite the village green. By the late 19th century this building was too small for the congregation, so it was sold and they moved to their current site west on Histon High Street. The old chapel building is now the Co-operative stores' pharmacy. The new building was constructed in 1896 as the Matthews' Memorial Church, in memory of Richard Matthews. The church continues today with a Sunday service at 10:45 am and occasional additional services for celebrations like Christmas and Easter. In 2020 the church completed a complete re-design with the removal of pews in the chapel, redecoration of the hall, plus the addition of a new kitchen, meeting room, and accessible entrance. The church runs two popular coffee mornings on Wednesday and Saturday providing a warm friendly space for the community. The redesign has also enabled the building to be more available to the community for events such as the monthly farmers market and regular society meetings, it can also be hired for private functions.

=== Histon Baptist ===
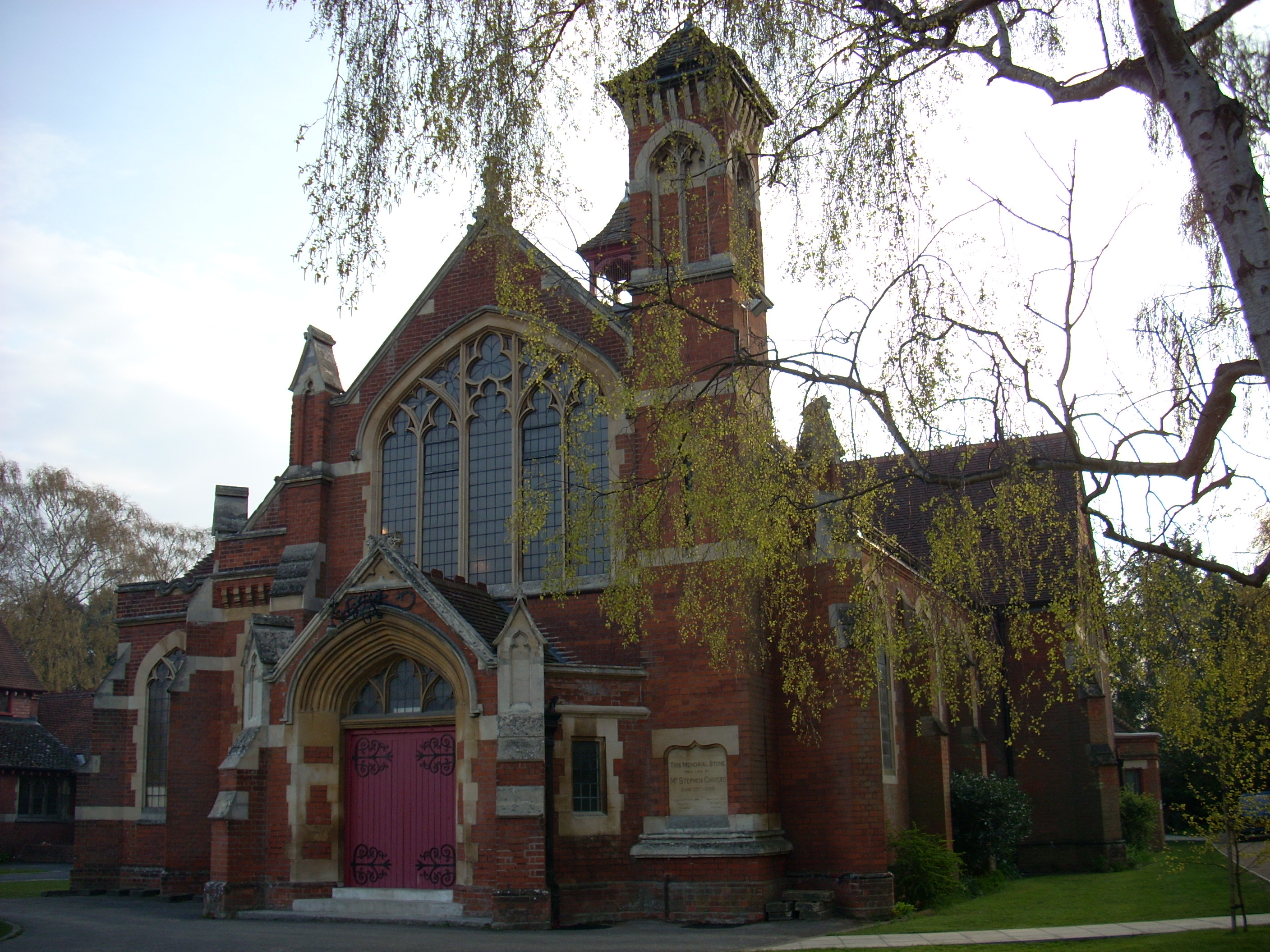
Histon Baptist church

This has also occupied two sites. The first chapel was built in 1858 and closed in 1899, the building having now been converted into flats. The current chapel was built in 1899 with the money and land being donated by Steven Chivers, but by 1908 this was no longer big enough and an extension was opened on the south side.

=== Salvation Army ===
In 1896 the Salvation Army rented the old Methodist chapel, but when the building was bought by the Co-Op in 1903 they built a temporary building next door and remained there for some time. This building was also later sold to the Co-Op, who then extended their store to its current size, and at some point the Salvation Army moved to their current site on the Impington Lane, then called Dog Kennel Lane.

=== St Etheldreda, Histon (demolished 1595) ===
This larger church stood close to St Andrews church, Histon. It was mainly demolished in about 1595 by Sir Francis Hinde to raise money and to provide building materials for a new wing at Madingley Hall. Hinde did not, however, completely demolish the church: in 1728 the chancel was said to be still standing. The churchyard survived until 1757 but was then taken into Abbey Farm. It is possible that the reduced population of Histon following the Black Death encouraged Hinde to demolish the church. Today the church site is not visible and is still shut off on the land of Abbey Farm. Due to this, rebellions against this have asked for the site to become re-available to society.

== Education ==
Schools in Histon
Histon Early Years Centre
No. of pupils:	115 (Nov 2023)
Phase of Education:	Nursery school
Histon and Impington Brook Primary School
No. of pupils:	458 (Nov 2023)
Phase of Education:	Primary School
Histon and Impington Park Primary School
No. of pupils:	317 (Nov 2023)
Phase of Education:	Primary School
Impington Village College
No. of pupils:	1,418 (Nov 2023)
Phase of Education:	Secondary school
information from Deptartment of Education website

Licensed schoolmasters appear on records in the village as early as 1580.

=== Histon School ===
Histon School was started in 1722; in 1729 it gained funding from the foundation of Elizabeth March – a board over one of the doors to Histon church records this bequest. Histon's share of this income was £14 a year. Until 1840 the school was held in the parish church, but then a purpose-built school was erected to hold up to 70 children in what is now called School Hill. In 1872, the school was enlarged; it was then held up as a model school for the whole county. On being taken over by the school board in 1893, it was enlarged still further with the addition of a new south wing, built over the Histon brook. In 1913 the school moved to its current site and the building was then handed back to the church and is now the church hall.

=== Histon Nursery School ===
In 1943, the Impington national school building was reopened as a nursery school for children of women on war work. This remained until 1962 when it was demolished in order to make way for Bridge Road, The county council decided to build a new nursery school. It was opened in 1963 and at the time was the only purpose-built nursery school in the county.

=== Histon and Impington Infants School ===
This was built in 1912 with the land and money being given by John Chivers and was opened in 1913 for all children of the villages from eight to fourteen. It became a primary school in 1939 with the opening of Impington college, and an infants a while after the opening of the junior school, on the green. In recent years, the infants school closed down and moved to a newly built, £16 million building located at a local farm and is now called 'Histon and Impington Park Primary School'

=== Histon and Impington Junior School ===
This school was opened in 1970, but it was not until the mid-to-late 1970s that it was enlarged to become the junior school. Until then, the two Histon and Impington schools had the same head teacher, who had to cycle from school to school every day. The new junior school was built on the village green and was at first just four classrooms, two for each of years 3 and 4 (ages 9–11), when the first pupils attended. It was opened in January 1972. The school was renamed 'Histon and Impington Brook Primary School' after the closure of the nearby Infant School and the construction of the new 'Histon and Impington Park Primary School'

== Sport and leisure ==
Histon and Impington is home to Histon Football Club who play in Non-League football in the United Counties League Premier Division South. The village recreation ground is home to a group of football clubs for children called the Histon Hornets as well as to Histon Cricket Club, which fields a number of teams at both youth and adult level. The recreation ground (Rec) is home to Histon Tennis Club which has access to three grass courts and one hard court. Histon Bowls Club also has a green at the Rec.

=== Public Houses ===
Histon is notable for having six pubs rather bucking the trend of village pubs being closed and converted for housing or offices.

Histon High Street has three pubs as close neighbours:

The Boot was trading from at least 1686. Today it describes itself as a Gastropub and is part of the Heartwood Inns Group

The Barley Mow was first mentioned in writing in 1774. Nowadays part of the Greene King chain of pubs. It underwent a £300k transformation in 2023.

The Red Lion has been a beer house since 1836 and now is part of the Young's group. Today it offers a small number of rooms to stay as well as its traditional pub offers. The pub hosts an annual beer festival, 2025 was its 25th such event.

Not far away are

The King William IV, affectionately known as the 'King Bill'. It was established in 1837 and is the only Free House in the village. It is family run by a live-in landlady.

The Rose & Crown which is operated by Individual Pubs Ltd a small group of pubs in the Cambridge area selling Milton Brewery beers which are brewed in nearby Waterbeach. It has been a public house since 1843,.

Tawa Lounge. Today it operates mainly as an Indian restaurant but does maintain a separate bar area. It has been known by various names over the years having at one time been the Green Hill pub until 1975.

== Notable people ==
- Rosamond Harding (1898–1982), music historian. Resident of Histon Manor House for 27 years.
