= Thomas Hodgson (priest) =

Anglican priest and Archdeacon of Huntingdon

Thomas Hodgson was a priest of the Church of England. He was the Archdeacon of Huntingdon from 1915 to 1921.

Hodgson was educated at Durham University and ordained in 1878. At Durham, Hodgson was a member of Hatfield Hall and won university prizes in both Theology and Hebrew. His first post was as a curate at St Andrew, Bishop Auckland after which he was an assistant master at St George's School, Brampton and then Head Master at Huntingdon Grammar School. He was Rector of Eynesbury from 1890 until 1912 when he became Vicar of St Neots.

He died on 28 September 1921.

Church of England titles
Preceded by Francis Gerald Vesey	Archdeacon of Huntingdon; 1915–1921	Succeeded by Kenneth Davenport Knowles
