= Richard Sledge =

Anglican priest

Richard Kitson Sledge (born 13 April 1930) is a retired Anglican priest.

Sledge educated at Epsom College and Peterhouse, Cambridge. After curacies at Emmanuel Church, Plymouth and St Stephen's Exeter he held incumbencies Dronfield and Hemingford Abbots He was the Archdeacon of Huntingdon from 1978 to 1996.

Church of England titles
Preceded by David Young	Archdeacon of Huntingdon; 1978-1996	Succeeded by John Beer
