= Robert Condall =

English priest

Robert Condall D.D, was a priest in England.

Condall was a Fellow of Brasenose College, Oxford. He was incorporated at Cambridge in 1574. He held livings at Wytham, Little Staughton and Edgworth. Condall was Archdeacon of Huntingdon from 1576 until his death in 1612.
