= John Sturges (priest) =

John Sturges DCL was a priest in England during the late 17th and early 18th centuries.

Sturges was educated at Christ's College, Cambridge and was incorporated at Oxford in 1682. He held livings at Kimbolton, Hartford, Kings Ripton and Glatton. He was Archdeacon of Huntingdon from 1720 until his death in 1725,
