= John Hammond Jr. (disambiguation) =

John P. Hammond (1942–2026), commonly known as John Hammond Jr., was an American blues musician.

John Hammond Jr. may also refer to:

- John Hays Hammond Jr. (1888–1965), American engineer
- John Henry Hammond Jr. (1910–1987), American record producer, father of John P. Hammond

== See also ==
- John Hammond (disambiguation)
