= Charles Robert Malden =

British naval officer, surveyor and educator

- Born: 9 August 1797; Putney, Surrey
- Died: 23 May 1855 (aged 57); Brighton, East Sussex
- Military career
- Allegiance: United Kingdom
- Branch: Royal Navy
- Rank: First Lieutenant
- Conflicts: Napoleonic Wars; War of 1812

Charles Robert Malden (9 August 1797 – 23 May 1855) was a nineteenth-century British naval officer, surveyor and educator. He is the discoverer of Malden Island in the central Pacific, which is named in his honour. He also founded Windlesham House School at Brighton, England.

== Biography ==
Malden was born in Putney, Surrey, son of Jonas Malden, a surgeon. He entered British naval service at the age of 11 on 22 June 1809. He served nine years as a volunteer 1st class, midshipman, and shipmate, including one year in the English Channel and Bay of Biscay (1809), four years at the Cape of Good Hope and in the East Indies (1809–14), two and a half years on the North American and West Indian stations (1814–16), and a year and a half in the Mediterranean (1817–18). He was present at the capture of Mauritius and Java, and at the battles of Baltimore and New Orleans.

He passed the examination in the elements of mathematics and the theory of navigation at the Royal Naval Academy on 2–4 September 1816, and became a 1st Lieutenant on 1 September 1818. In eight years of active service as an officer, he served two and a half years in a surveying ship in the Mediterranean (1818–21), one and a half years in a surveying sloop in the English Channel and off the coast of Ireland (1823–24), and one and a half years as Surveyor of the frigate HMS Blonde during a voyage (1824–26) to and from the Hawaiian Islands (then known as the "Sandwich islands"). In Hawaii he surveyed harbours which, he noted, were "said not to exist by Captains Cook and Vancouver." On the return voyage he discovered and explored uninhabited Malden Island in the central Pacific on 30 July 1825. After his return he left active service but remained at half pay. He served for several years as hydrographer to King William IV.

He married Frances Cole, daughter of Rev. William Hodgson Cole, rector of West Clandon and Vicar of Wonersh, near Guildford, Surrey, on 8 April 1828. Malden became the father of seven sons and a daughter.

From 1830 to 1836 he took pupils for the Royal Navy at Ryde, Isle of Wight. He purchased the school of Henry Worsley at Newport, Isle of Wight, in December 1836, reopened it as a preparatory school on 20 February 1837, and moved it to Montpelier Road in Brighton in December 1837. He built the Windlesham House School at Brighton in 1844, and conducted the school until his death there in 1855. He was succeeded as headmaster by his son Henry Charles Malden.
