= James Srawley =

British archdeacon (1868–1954)

James Herbert Srawley
- James Herbert Srawley in 1917

James Herbert Srawley (1868–1954) was Archdeacon of Wisbech from 1916 to 1923.

Srawley was educated at King Edward's School, Birmingham and Gonville and Caius College, Cambridge and ordained Deacon in 1893 and Priest in 1894. After a curacy at St Matthew's Church, Walsall he was Vice-Principal of Lichfield Theological College then a Lecturer at Selwyn College, Cambridge. He was Rector of Weeting from 1912 to 1919; Vicar of Sutton-in-the-Isle from 1919 to 1924; and Canon Residentiary and Chancellor of Lincoln Cathedral from 1924 to 1947; and Prebendary of Heydour-cum-Walton from 1930.

A noted author on religious subjects, he died on 6 January 1954.

== Notes ==
Church of England titles
Preceded by Colin Arthur Fitzgerald Campbell	Archdeacon of Huntingdon and Wisbech; 1916–1923	Succeeded by George Herbert Ward
