= Kenneth Knowles =

Kenneth Davenport Knowles (9 March 1874 – 9 December 1944) was a priest of the Church of England. He was the Archdeacon of Huntingdon from 1921 to 1943.

Knowles was educated at The King's School, Canterbury, at Bedford School, and at Worcester College, Oxford. He was admitted as a solicitor in 1900 before entering Ely Theological College in 1905. He was ordained the following year and his first curacy was at Ramsey, Huntingdonshire after which he was Rector of Woodwalton. He was a temporary chaplain to the British Armed Forces during World War I. Later he was Rector of Brampton, then Upton and finally Diddington.

Church of England titles
Preceded by Thomas Hodgson	Archdeacon of Huntingdon; 1921–1943	Succeeded by William Andrewes Uthwatt
