= John Brown Hammond =

American activist (1856-1940)

As a young man, John Brown, Hammond (August 29, 1856 – July 20, 1940) believed in and used violent action to try to bring about alcohol prohibition in the United States. However, over time, he came to pursue non-violent actions through the Women’s Christian Temperance Union (WCTU) and other temperance groups.

Although prohibition was repealed in 1933, Hammond promoted a return to it for the rest of his life. Several months before his death in a nursing home he was working to organize "The Eighteenth Amendment Rescue Association" and believed that prohibition would eventually be re-imposed.
