= John Hammond (priest) =

English priest

John Hammond, D.D (1640–1723) was a priest in England.

Hammond was educated at Christ Church, Oxford. He was Chaplain to Dr. William Fuller, Bishop of Lincoln; Rector of Chalfont St Giles, a Canon of Lincoln and Archdeacon of Huntingdon from 1673 to 1701. He died on 25 May 1723.
