= Arthur Royle (priest) =

Arthur Royle (23 April 1895 – 8 August 1973) was a priest of the Church of England. He was the Archdeacon of Huntingdon from 1954 to 1965.

Royle was educated at Maidstone Grammar School and Keble College, Oxford. He was ordained in 1924 and was a curate at St John Evangelist's East Dulwich and then Vicar of St Paul's Newington. He was Rector of Orton Longueville from 1942 to 1966.

Church of England titles
Preceded by James William Percy Jones	Archdeacon of Huntingdon; 1954–1965	Succeeded by Dennis Fountain Page
