= Albert Clauson, 1st Baron Clauson =

The Right Honourable The Lord Clauson CBE, PC

Lord Justice of Appeal
- In office 1938–1942
- Preceded by: Sir Mark Romer

Justice of the High Court
- In office 1926–1938

Personal details
- Born: 14 January 1870 Paddington, London
- Died: 15 March 1946 (aged 76) North Mimms
- Profession: Barrister, Judge

Albert Charles Clauson, 1st Baron Clauson CBE, PC (14 January 1870 – 15 March 1946) was a British barrister and judge who sat as a Lord Justice of Appeal.

== Background and education ==
Clauson was born on 14 January 1870 to Charles Clauson, a merchant, and his wife Julia Burton. After attending the Merchant Taylors' School in 1881 he was offered a scholarship to St John's College, Oxford, where he gained a first in classics and literature.

== Legal and judicial career ==
In 1891 he was called to the Bar by Lincoln's Inn, and thanks to his association with his uncle, Henry Buckley, he gained a large practice extremely early. Acting as editor of the seventh and eighth editions of Buckley's Company Law, Clauson was made King's Counsel in 1910. During the First World War he worked for the Admiralty for free, and in thanks was made a CBE in 1920.

In 1926 Clauson was made a judge of the Chancery Division of the High Court of Justice, receiving the customary knighthood. After twelve years on the bench he was sworn in as a Lord Justice of Appeal in 1936 and made a Privy Councillor, but retired in 1942. Following his retirement he was made Baron Clauson, of Hawkshead in the County of Hertford, and as a Lord of Appeal heard cases in the House of Lords. Lord Clauson died on 15 March 1946, and having no children, the peerage became extinct on his death.

== Arms ==
Coat of arms of Albert Clauson, 1st Baron Clauson
Motto Spes Et Fides

Peerage of the United Kingdom
New creation	Baron Clauson; 1942–1946	Extinct
