= Windlesham House School =

Preparatory school in Pulborough, West Sussex, England

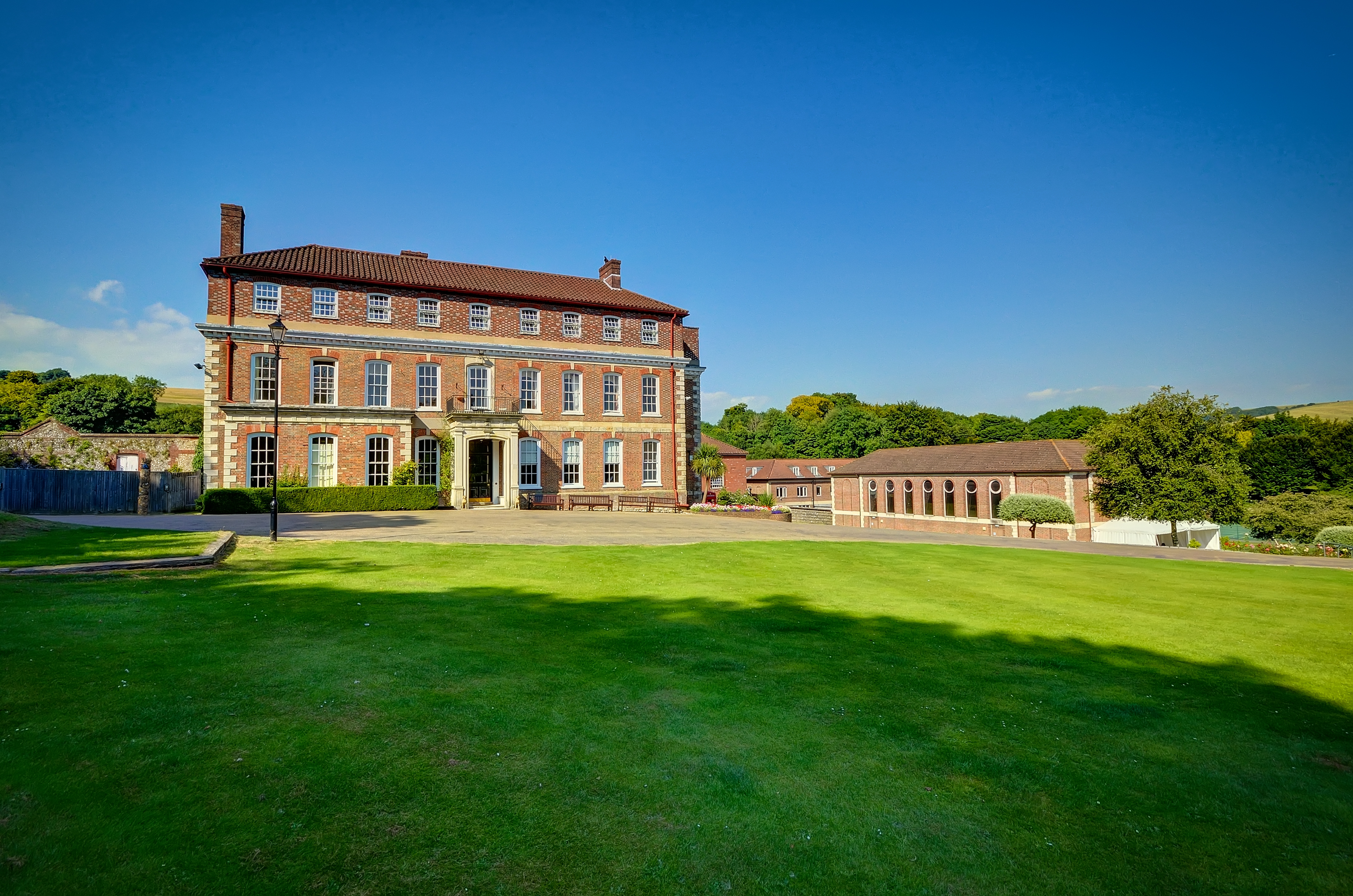

Location
- London Road; Washington; Pulborough, West Sussex, RH20 4AY; England; 50.88994°N 0.41848°W

Information
- Type: Preparatory school
- Motto: In Deo Fidemus
- Established: 1837; 189 years ago
- Founder: Charles Robert Malden
- Department for Education URN: 126113 Tables
- Head teacher: Ben Evans
- Gender: Coeducational
- Age: 4 to 13
- Enrolment: 345
- Houses: Drake, Grenfell, Hunt, Raleigh, Scott, Bader
- Colours: Black and White
- Website: windlesham.com

Windlesham House School is an independent boarding and day school for boys and girls aged 4 to 13 on the South Downs, in Pulborough, West Sussex, England. It was founded in 1837 by Charles Robert Malden and was the first boys' preparatory school in the United Kingdom. In 1967 it became the first IAPS co-educational school. The school moved to its current location in 1934. It caters for over 300 pupils. Children aged 4 to 7 are taught in the pre-prep.

From 2011 onward, the school has been inspected by the Independent Schools Inspectorate, who awarded it 'excellent' in its 2017 report. The school received an 'outstanding' award in its Ofsted inspection in 2010.

== School Facilities ==
In 2014 a new playground was opened by Lord Denman after the Parents Association raised money for its construction. Additionally, their work enabled them to donate £3,000 to Cystic Fibrosis, Cardiac Support, Sanchat Charitable Trust, Worthing Food Bank, Sussex Autistic Society and Canine Partners.

== Curriculum ==
The school does not follow standardised tests. However, in the 2017 Independent Schools Inspectorate data from the school were seen to indicate that the majority of the students were working above the national average.

== Uniform ==
The School does not have a uniform, but rather a dress code in place.

== Headship ==
The headship of Windlesham remained within the Malden family for 157 years spanning five generations. From its founding in 1837 until 1994 each headmaster had been the son of his predecessor, with the exception of Grace Scott Malden, who succeeded her husband, and Charles Christopher Malden, whose elder brother, Roger, led the school while he completed his national service and degree.

- 1837–1855 Lieutenant Charles Robert Malden, RN
- 1855–1888 Major Henry Charles Malden
- 1888–1896 Charles Scott Malden
- 1896–1927 Grace Gilbert Scott Malden
- 1927–1953 Christopher Scott-Malden, as principal, with a subordinate headmaster
- 1953–1957 Lieutenant-Colonel Roger William Malden
- 1957–1994 Charles Christopher and Elizabeth Ann Malden, jointly
- 1994–1995 Ian and Margaret Angus, jointly
- 1995–1996 Stephen and Julie Goodhart, as acting heads, jointly
- 1996–2006 Philip Lough
- 2006–2007 Paul Forte, as acting headmaster
- 2007–2020 Richard Foster
- 2020– Ben Evans, formerly headmaster of Edge Grove School

Christopher Scott-Malden, who had expected to run the school in partnership with his more scholarly elder brother, Gilbert, structured his role as principal, appointing subordinate headmasters. Gilbert held the title of Head Master between 1914 and 1921, but in a subordinate role to his mother, Grace.

Both Grace Scott Malden and Elizabeth Ann Malden were known to the pupils as 'Mrs Charles', a tradition that stretches back to 1880 when Charles Scott Malden was styled as 'Mr. Charles' to distinguish him from his father, 'Mr. (Henry) Malden'.

== Notable former pupils (ordered by date of birth) ==
Former pupils are traditionally known as Old Windleshamites, though the term 'OWLs' (Old Windlesham Leavers) has been used by the school in recent years.

- Lieutenant Colonel Charles Ichabod Wright (1828–1905), banker and Conservative politician
- Professor Reverend Walter Shirley (1828–1866), priest and historian
- William John Monson, 1st Viscount Oxenbridge, PC (1828–1900), Liberal politician and Captain of the Queen's bodyguard
- Major Henry Charles Malden (1829–1907), notable for his role in the standardisation of the laws of association football. Windlesham's first pupil and second headmaster
- Debonnaire John Monson, 8th Baron Monson, KCVO (1830–1900), Sergeant-at-Arms to Queen Victoria
- Sir John Edward Dorington, 1st Bt., PC, DL (1832–1911), Conservative politician
- Gerald Vesey (1832–1915), Archdeacon of Huntington
- Ross Lowis Mangles, VC (1833–1905), first civilian recipient of the Victoria Cross
- Roden Noel (1834–1894), poet
- Ronald Leslie-Melville, 11th Earl of Leven, KT, PC, DL (1835–1906), Keeper of the Privy Seal of Scotland
- Saumarez Smith (1836–1909), Archbishop of Sydney
- Sir Frederick Albert Bosanquet, KC, JP (1837–1923), lawyer and Common Serjeant of London
- Sir William Hart Dyke, 7th Bt., PC, DL, JP (1837–1931), Conservative politician, 1862 World Rackets Champion and tennis pioneer
- Admiral Sir Robert More-Molyneux, GCB (1838–1904), Royal Navy officer and President of the Royal Naval College, Greenwich
- Sir Lepel Griffin, KCSI (1838–1908), writer and diplomat of the British Raj
- Sir Edmund Verney, 3rd Bt., FRGS, DL, JP (1838–1910), Royal Navy officer, author and Liberal politician
- Leveson Francis Vernon-Harcourt, MICE (1839–1907), civil engineer
- Henry Brudenell-Bruce, 5th Marquess of Ailesbury (1842–1911), soldier, businessman and Conservative politician
- Joseph Herbert Tritton (1844–1923), banker
- George Carnac Fisher (1844–1921), Bishop of Southampton
- Admiral Swinton Colthurst Holland (1844–1922), Royal Navy officer
- Hubert Thomas Knox, MRIA, FRSAI (1845–1921), Irish historian
- Sir Henry Bellingham, 4th Bt. (1846–1921), Conservative politician
- Sir Andrew Agnew, 9th Bt., JP (1850–1928), Liberal Unionist politician
- Herbert Lawford (1851–1925), Scottish tennis player, 1887 Wimbledon champion
- Major Edward Hay Mackenzie Elliot (1852–1920), soldier and England footballer
- Alexander Wallace Rimington, ARE, RBA, Hon. FSA (1853–1918), etcher, painter, illustrator and author
- St John Brodrick, 1st Earl of Midleton, KP, PC, DL (1856–1942), Conservative politician, Secretary of State for War during the Second Boer War
- Lieutenant General Sir William Pitcairn Campbell, KCB (1856–1933), British general during World War I and Aide-de-Camp to King Edward VII
- George Browne, 6th Marquess of Sligo (1856–1935), Irish peer and soldier
- Sir John Barlow, 1st Bt. (1857–1932), Liberal politician
- Percy Melmoth Walters (1863–1936), England football captain
- Arthur Melmoth Walters (1865–1941), England footballer
- Lieutenant General Sir Sydney Turing Barlow Lawford, KCB (1865–1953), British general and father of 'Rat Pack' actor Peter Lawford
- Arthur Browne, 8th Marquess of Sligo, KBE (1867–1951), Irish peer, soldier and Principal Assistant Secretary to the Imperial War Graves Commission
- Richard Heywood (1867–1955), Bishop of Mombasa
- Admiral of the Fleet Sir Osmond Brock, GCB, KCMG, KCVO (1869–1947), commander of HMS Princess Royal and the 1st Battlecruiser Squadron at the Battle of Jutland
- Lieutenant Colonel Sir Alexander Leith, 1st Bt., MC (1869–1956), British benefactor
- Rennie MacInnes (1870–1931), Bishop of Jerusalem
- Alnod Boger (1871–1940), first-class cricketer
- Arthur Dunbar Whatman (1873–1965), cricketer; civilian aide-de-camp to General RAP Clements during the Second Boer War
- Frederick Waldegrave Head, MC & Bar (1874–1941), twice-decorated Senior Chaplain to the Guards Division during World War I and Archbishop of Melbourne
- Ian Hannah (1874–1944), academic, writer and Conservative politician
- Arthur Baillie Lumsdaine Karney (1874–1963), first Bishop of Johannesburg, later Bishop of Southampton
- Harry Wrightson (1874–1919), Conservative politician, notable for dying before he could take his seat in Parliament
- Elliot James Dowell Colvin (1885–1950), Prime Minister of Jammu and Kashmir
- Guy Kindersley (1876–1956), Conservative politician
- J. I. Wedgwood (1883–1951), first Presiding Bishop of the Liberal Catholic Church
- Archibald Bentley Beauman (1888–1977), British Army officer
- Lionel Bostock, OBE, MC (1888–1962), first-class cricketer and British Army officer
- Sutton Vane (1888–1963), British playwright
- James Philip Mills (1890–1960), civil servant and ethnographer
- Claud Lovat Fraser (1890–1921), artist, designer and author
- Philip Sargant Florence (1890–1982), American economist
- Christopher Scott-Malden (1890–1956), first-class cricketer and Windlesham's fifth headmaster
- Hon. Freddie Calthorpe (1892–1935), first-class cricketer
- Lieutenant-Colonel Dick Rawlinson, OBE (1894–1984), intelligence officer in both world wars and peacetime film producer and screenwriter
- Major John Roland Abbey (1894–1969), prolific English book collector, High Sheriff of Sussex and British Army officer
- Donald Howard Beves (1896–1961), academic
- Robert Grimston, 1st Baron Grimston of Westbury (1897–1979), Conservative politician
- Hilary Saint George Saunders (1898–1951), British Army officer, author and historian
- Major Sir Charles Buchanan, 4th Bt. (1899–1984), British Army officer and High Sheriff of Nottinghamshire
- Kenneth Gandar-Dower (1908–1944), sportsman, aviator, explorer and author
- Sir Michael Hordern, CBE (1911–1995), actor
- John Davies, MBE (1916–1979), Conservative politician and director-general of the Confederation of British Industry. Father of Frank Davies (q.v., born 1946)
- Prince Emanuel Vladimirovich Galitzine (1918–2002), Spitfire pilot and member of the Russian royal family
- Chris Tyler (1938–2016), surfing entrepreneur
- James Hamilton-Paterson (born 1941), poet and novelist
- Frank Davies (born 1946), Anglo-Canadian record producer. Son of John Davies, MBE (q.v., born 1916)
- John Michie (born 1956), actor
- Duncan Goodhew, MBE (born 1957), swimming athlete and Olympic gold medalist
- Dr Martha Holmes (born 1961), BAFTA award-winning producer of wildlife documentaries
- Alexandra Hall Hall (born 1964), diplomat
- Andrew Palmer (born c.1964), three time BAFTA award-winning producer, director and cinematographer
- Lilibet Foster (born 1965), American director, producer and writer
- Andrew Page (born 1965), diplomat
- Professor Chris Whitty (born 1966), Chief Medical Officer to the UK Government
- Sophie Darlington (born 1966), BAFTA award-winning wildlife filmmaker and cinematographer
- Guy Ritchie (born 1968), film director, producer and screenwriter, married to Madonna 2000–2008
- Frances Osborne (born 1969), author, married to George Osborne 1998–2019
- Adam Buxton (born 1969), actor and comedian
- Natasha Ellis (born c.1970), poker player and author of The D'Evil Diaries series of books (as Tatum Flynn)
- Gabriel Weston (born 1970), surgeon, author and television presenter
- Polly Renton (1970–2010), documentary film-maker
- Tina Cook (born 1970), three-time Olympic medalist event rider and 2009 European Champion
- Noah Huntley (born 1974), actor
- Simon Wheeler (born 1975), TV screenwriter and producer, married to Hermione Norris
- Alex Chalk (born 1976), Conservative politician, Secretary of State for Justice and Lord Chancellor 2023–2024
- Tom Hiddleston (born 1981), actor
- Jacquetta Wheeler (born 1981), fashion model
- Christopher Wheeler (born 1982), headmaster of Monkton Combe School (2016) and Canford School (from September 2025)
- Tom Williams (born 1983), English rugby union player
- Georgia Hardinge (born 1984), fashion designer
- Ted Dwane (born 1984), musician, bass guitarist of Mumford & Sons
- Thom Evans (born 1985), Scottish international rugby union player
- Alfie Allen (born 1986), actor
- Lucy Griffiths (born 1986), actor
- Alan Pownall (born 1986), singer/songwriter, married to Gabriella Wilde (q.v., born 1989)
- Tamzin Merchant (born 1987), actress
- Gabriella Wilde (born 1989), actress and model, married to Alan Pownall (q.v., born 1986)
