= John Hammond (Canadian football) =

Canadian football player (1923–1999)

Profile
- Position: Guard

Personal information
- Born: June 25, 1923; Winnipeg, Manitoba, Canada
- Died: December 18, 1999 (aged 76); Regina, Saskatchewan, Canada
- Listed height: 6 ft 0 in (1.83 m)
- Listed weight: 198 lb (90 kg)

Career information
- College: McGill University

Career history
- 1943: Regina All Services
- 1946: Winnipeg Blue Bombers
- 1947–51: Montreal Alouettes

Awards and highlights
- Grey Cup champion (1949)

John Wilson Hammond (June 25, 1923 – December 18, 1999) was a Canadian Football League player and Grey Cup champion. He played offensive guard. A native of Winnipeg, Hammond first played senior football with the Regina All Services team in 1943, and later attended University of Washington. In 1946 he joined his hometown Winnipeg Blue Bombers, playing in their Grey Cup loss to the Toronto Argonauts. He then went east to study engineering at McGill University and played with the Montreal Alouettes in 1947. He was one of the "unsung heroes" of the Larks first Grey Cup championship in 1949. He played 40 games for the Als over 5 seasons.

Hammond died in Regina, Saskatchewan on December 18, 1999, at the age of 76.
