= King's College London Business =

Technology transfer company

King's College London Business Ltd (formerly KCL Enterprises Ltd (Oct 1992-Feb 2007) and Precis Ltd (May 1992- Oct 1992) is an English technology transfer private limited company. A wholly owned subsidiary of King's College London, King's Business "supports and commercialises the research of King’s academic staff".

== Board of Directors ==
The company officers include:

- Annie Kent (Director)
- Stephen Large (Director)
- Nicholas Leake (Director)
- Simon Cruickshank (Secretary)
