= Thomas Walter Harding =

British industrialist and civic figure (1842–1927)

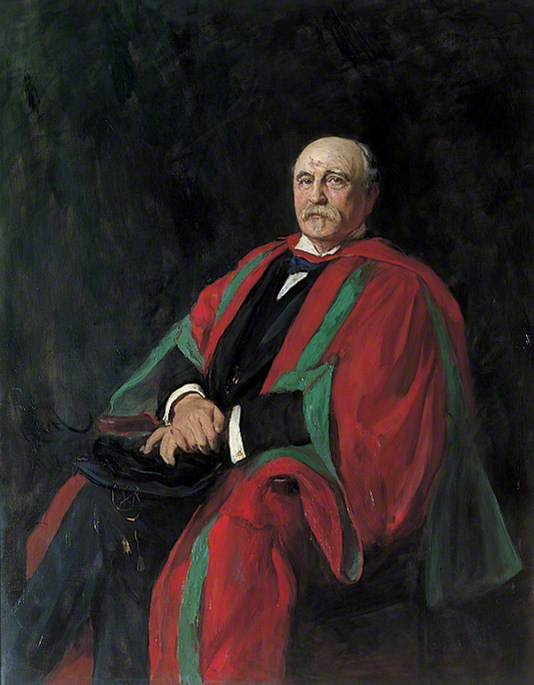
- Portrait of Thomas Walter Harding
- Born: 22 January 1843; Lille, France
- Died: 26 March 1927 (aged 84)
- Occupation: Industrialist

Colonel Thomas Walter Harding (22 January 1843 – 26 March 1927) was a British industrialist and civic figure in Leeds, West Yorkshire, England.

== Early life and family ==
Harding was born in Lille, France, where his Leeds-based father Thomas Richards Harding (1812–1895) had a factory, and was educated at Leeds Grammar School.

On 19 May 1869 he married Anne Heycock Butler (1846–1923), daughter of Ambrose Edmund Heath Buckley Butler, ironmaster, of Kirkstall, Leeds. They had a son, Walter Ambrose Heath (1870–1942), and a daughter, who died in infancy.

== Career ==
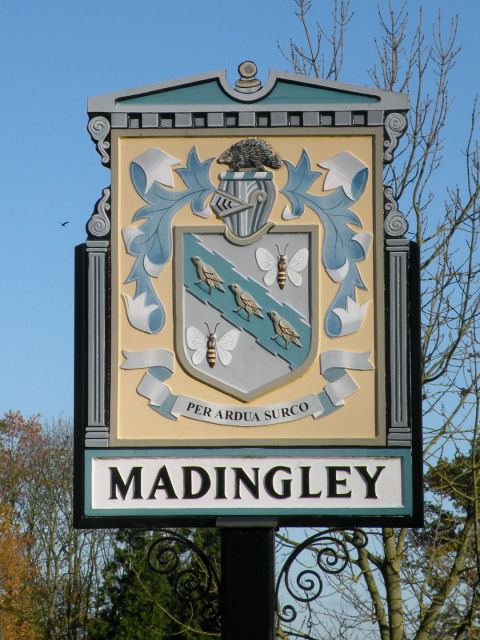
Arms of Thomas Walter Harding: village sign of Madingley in Cambridgeshire, an estate he purchased in 1905

He built extensions to Tower Works in Holbeck in 1899 and the 1920s and, when City Square was remodelled, proposed and financed the sculptures including the Black Prince.

Harding used the title "Colonel" after the Leeds Artillery Volunteers gave him the title of Honorary Colonel when he retired after 33 years service in 1893. He was involved in local politics and actively championed the foundation of Leeds City Art Gallery which opened in 1888. He donated a number of pictures to the collection including Scotland Forever! by Butler in 1888. He was Chairman of the Art Gallery Committee between 1887 and 1904.

He was Lord Mayor of Leeds in 1898–99, and was created a Freeman of the City of Leeds in 1903. He moved from his home in Abbey House (originally the Kirkstall Abbey gatehouse) to Hartsholme Hall in Lincolnshire (1902) and Madingley Hall in Cambridgeshire (1906), which he restored. He was appointed High Sheriff of Cambridgeshire and Huntingdonshire in March 1901, and Deputy Lieutenant of Cambridgeshire in April 1901.

Harding was also a writer. In 1912, he produced Tales of Madingley, a romance loosely based on the history of the house and vicinity. In 1926, he published The Abbot of Kirkstall, a novel about the Black Prince, John of Gaunt, and John Wycliffe.

== Death and legacy ==
Harding died in 1927.

== Selected publications ==
- Tales of Madingley. Bowes and Bowes, Cambridge, 1912.
- The Abbot of Kirkstall, 1926.
