= Henry Charles Malden =

British schoolmaster

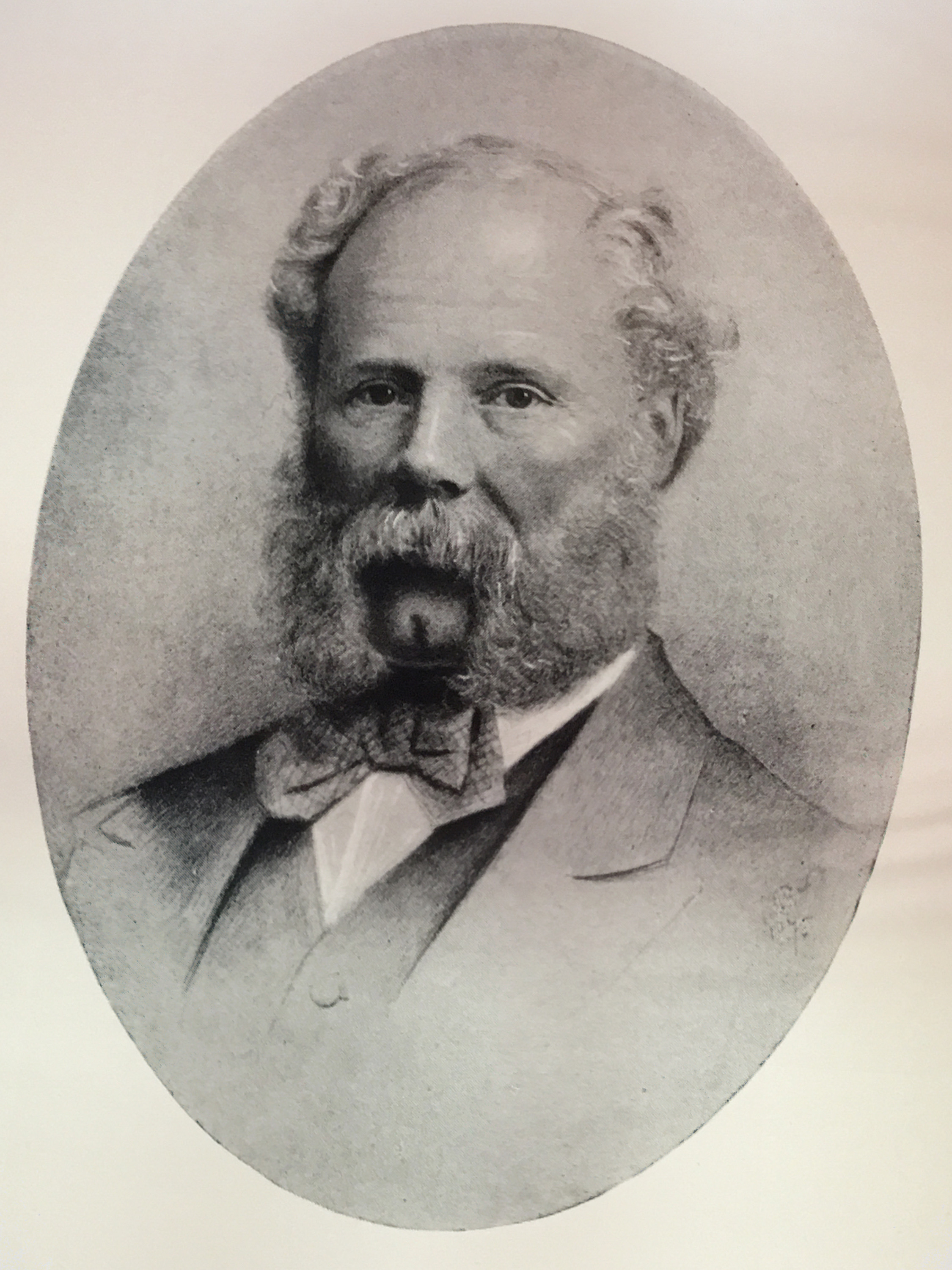
- Born: 24 February 1829; Ryde, Isle of Wight
- Died: 13 June 1907 (aged 78); Godalming, Surrey
- Other name: Old Harry
- Education: Windlesham House School
- Alma mater: Trinity College, Cambridge
- Known for: contribution to the history of football
- Father: Charles Robert Malden

Henry Charles Malden (24 February 1829 – 13 June 1907) was a nineteenth-century schoolmaster and antiquarian, notable for his role in the history of football.

== Early life ==
Malden was born in 1829 at Ryde, Isle of Wight, the son of Charles Robert Malden and his wife Frances (née Cole). From 1837 to 1843 he attended Windlesham House School, which had been founded by his father. At the age of 15 he studied with the Rev. Thomas Scott in preparation for university.

== Cambridge ==
From 1847 until 1851, Malden attended Trinity College, Cambridge. In 1848, Malden participated in the creation of a set of rules of football known as the "Cambridge Rules". As Malden recalled in 1897:

[A]n attempt was made to get up some football, in preference to the hockey then in vogue. But the result was dire confusion, as every man played the rules he had been accustomed to at his public school. I remember how the Eton men howled at the Rugby for handling the ball. So it was agreed that two men should be chosen to represent each of the public schools, and two, who were not public school men, for the 'Varsity. G. Salt and myself were chosen for the 'Varsity. I wish I could remember the others. Burn, of Rugby, was one; Whymper, of Eton, I think, also. We were fourteen in all, I believe. Harrow, Eton, Rugby, Winchester, and Shrewsbury were represented. We met in my rooms after Hall, which in those days was at 4 p.m.; anticipating a long meeting I cleared the tables and provided pens, ink, and paper. Several asked me on coming in whether an exam. was on! Every man brought a copy of his school rules, or knew them by heart, and our progress in framing new rules was slow. On several occasions Salt and I, being unprejudiced, carried or struck out a rule when the voting was equal. We broke up five minutes before midnight. The new rules were printed as the 'Cambridge Rules,' copies were distributed and pasted up on Parker's Piece, and very satisfactorily they worked, for it is right to add that they were loyally kept, and I never heard of any public school man who gave up playing from not liking the rules.

According to his daughter Rose, Malden "always considered himself the father" of the laws of Association Football because of his role in the creation of the 1848 Cambridge Rules. Philip Goodhart and Christopher Chataway write that Malden "can certainly claim as great a share of the history of football as Webb Ellis".

In 1851, Malden graduated from Cambridge with a football "blue".

== Career ==
After Cambridge, Malden immediately returned to Windlesham House School, where he served as senior tutor under his father. He succeeded his father as headmaster upon the latter's death in 1855, continuing in this position until 1888.

== Family ==
In August 1855, Malden married Euphemia "Effie" Margaret Scott. Effie was the daughter of the Rev. Thomas Scott, with whom Malden had studied before attending university. She died in 1862, after the birth of their fourth child. The widowed Malden married Catharine Walters in April 1865.

Malden's four children with Effie were Emily Scott (born Brighton 1856, died Chelsea 1933, 1 son); Charles Scott (born Brighton 1858, died Brighton 1896, five children); Rose Scott (born Brighton 1860, died Hove 1947), and Henry Melville Scott (born 1862, died 1913, 5 children). His three children with Catharine were Winifrede Walters Scott (born Brighton 1866, died 1929); Mary Effie Walters Scott (born 1871, died 1956); and John Walters Scott (born Brighton 1883).

== Later life ==
In 1888, Malden suffered an attack of typhoid. He retired as headmaster of Windlesham House School, succeeded by his eldest son Charles. He moved to Crowborough, where he lived for nine years before moving again to Godalming in 1897. It was from Godalming that he wrote his 1897 letter to the Football Association describing his memories of the creation of the Cambridge rules of football, as noted above. He edited the parish registers of Godalming for publication in 1904.

He sat on Brighton Town Council from 1886 to 1892, and on Godalming Town Council from 1891 until his death.

He died in Godalming on 13 June 1907. He was survived by his wife Catharine and six children.

== Publications ==
- Malden, Henry C., ed. (1904). The Parish Registers of Godalming, Surrey: part i. London: Surrey Parish Register Society. hdl:2027/iau.31858034329395.
