= Outhwaite =

Outhwaite is a surname of English origin and may refer to:

== People ==
- Outhwaite Family, Auckland, a pioneer family in Auckland, New Zealand
- Tamzin Outhwaite (born 1970), British television actor
- Ida Rentoul Outhwaite (1888–1960), Australian artist and book illustrator
- Joseph H. Outhwaite (1841–1907), American lawyer and politician
- R. L. Outhwaite (1868–1930), English Liberal politician
- Sarah Tait (née Outhwaite; 1983–2016), Australian rower

== Places ==
- Outhwaite Homes, a public housing development in Cleveland, Ohio
