= Madingley =

Village in Cambridgeshire, England

Coordinates: 52.2250°N 0.0409°E

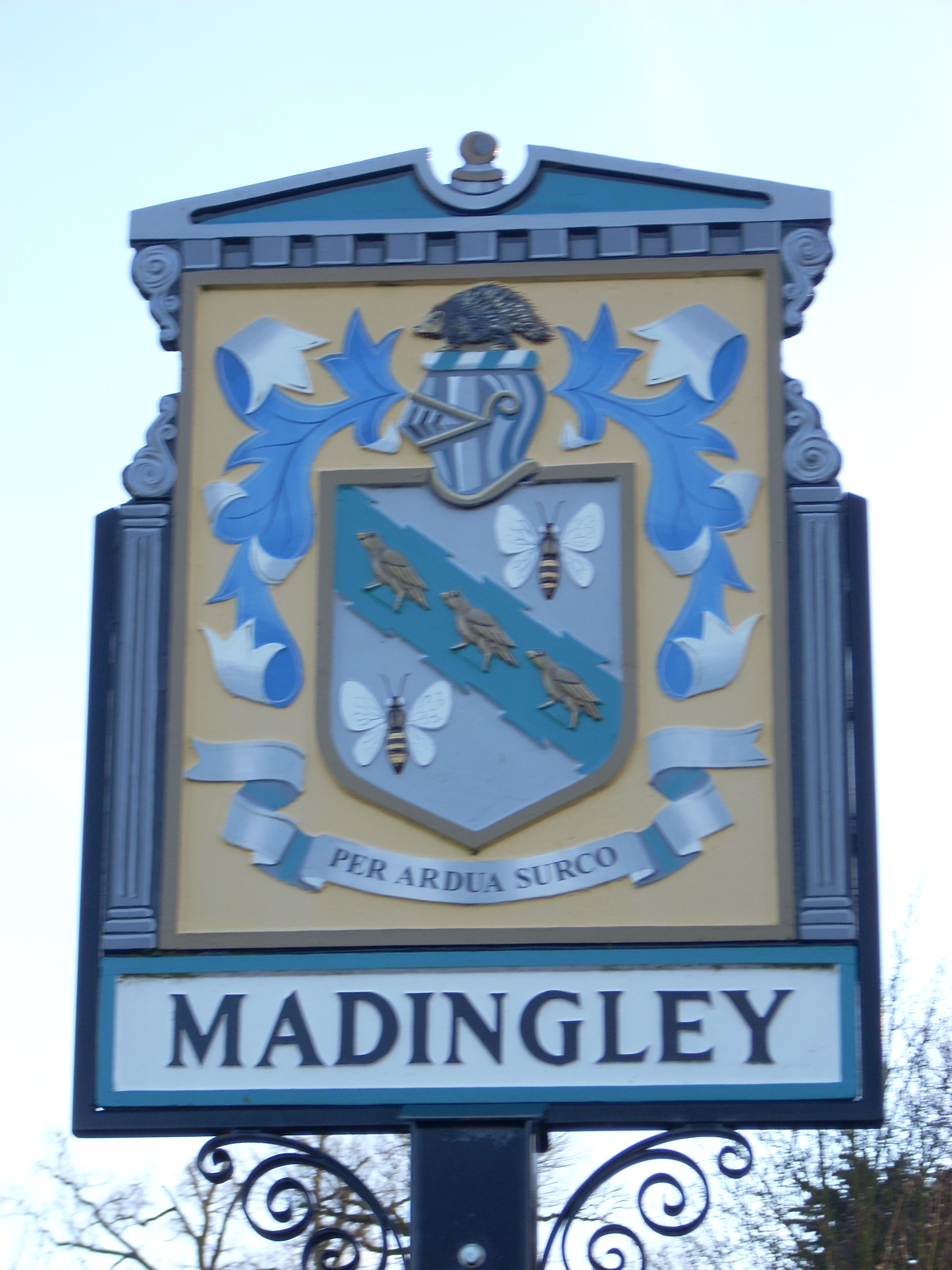
- Madingley village sign in March 2008

- Location within Cambridgeshire
- Population: 210 2011
- OS grid reference: TL395605
- District: South Cambridgeshire
- Shire county: Cambridgeshire
- Region: East
- Country: England
- Sovereign state: United Kingdom
- Post town: CAMBRIDGE
- Postcode district: CB23
- Dialling code: 01954
- Police: Cambridgeshire
- Fire: Cambridgeshire
- Ambulance: East of England
- UK Parliament: South Cambridgeshire

Madingley is a small village near Cambridge, England. It is located close to the nearby villages of Coton and Dry Drayton on the western outskirts of Cambridge. The population of the civil parish at the 2011 Census was 210. The village was known as Madingelei in the Domesday Book of 1086, a name meaning "Woodland clearing of the family or followers of a man called Mada". Madingley is well known for its 16th-century manor house, Madingley Hall, which is owned by the University of Cambridge.

== Madingley Hall ==
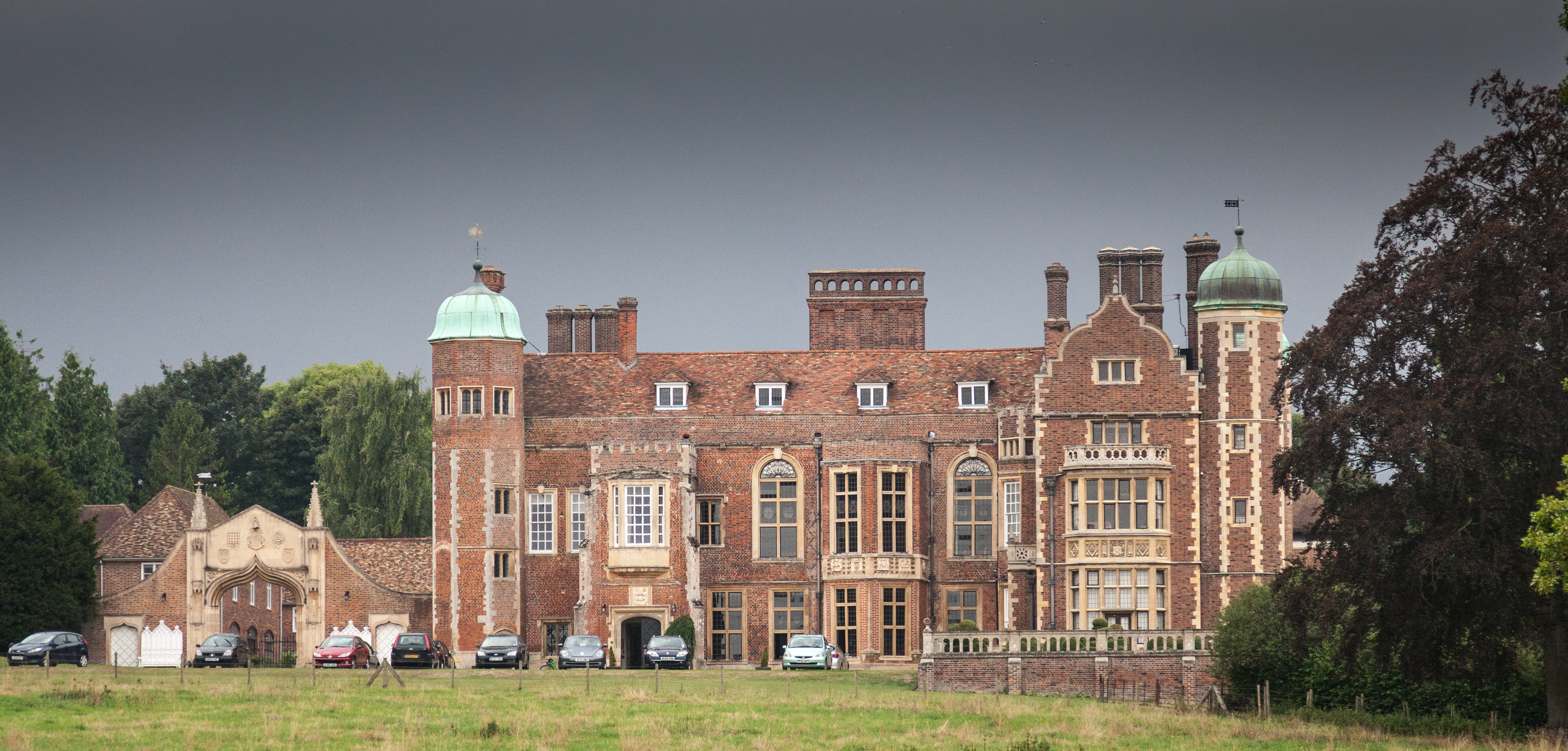
Madingley Hall, built in 1543, now home to the University of Cambridge Institute of Continuing Education

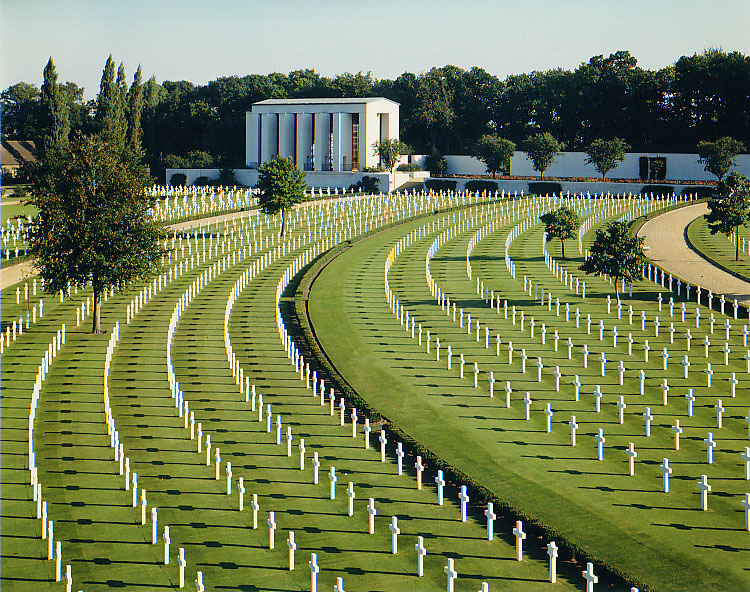
Cambridge American Cemetery and Memorial in Madingley

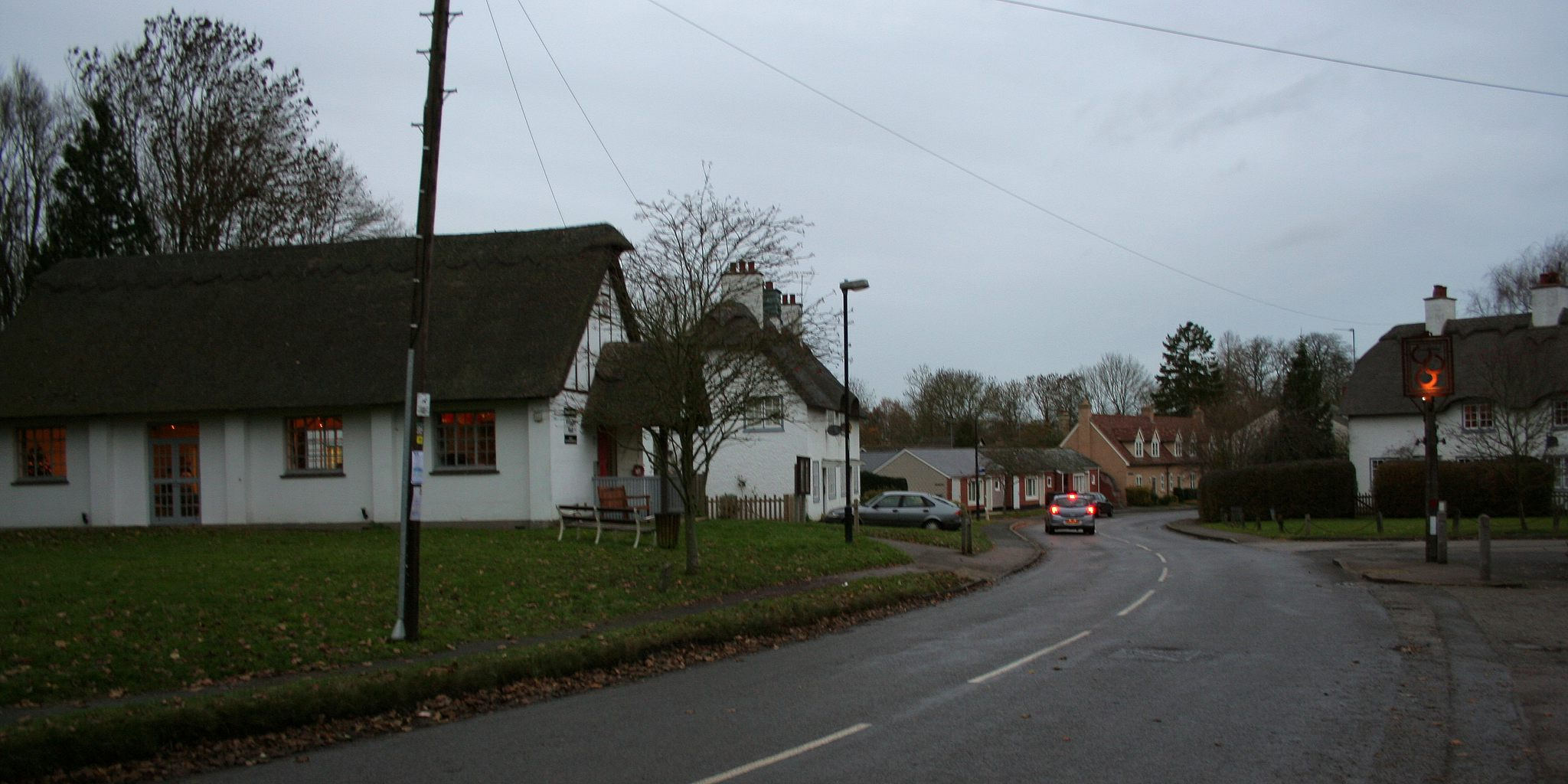
High Street with village hall (left) and pub sign

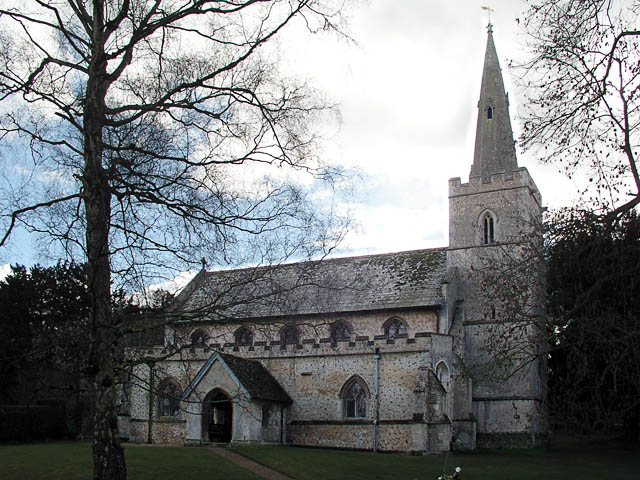
St Mary Magdalene Church

The village is home to Madingley Hall, which was built by Sir John Hynde in 1543 and occupied as a residence by his descendants until the 1860s. It is surrounded by parkland. Queen Victoria rented the Hall in 1860 for her son Edward (the future King Edward VII) to live in while he was an undergraduate at the University of Cambridge. The family sold the Hall in 1871 to Henry Hurrell.

It was then sold to Colonel T. Walter Harding in 1905. In 1927, he died and left it to his only son, the zoologist Ambrose Harding, who moved there with his wife and adult children. His daughter Rosamond Harding, notable musicologist and music historian, lived there for 20 years until her late father's trust sold it to the university.

=== University of Cambridge ===
The Madingley Hall estate, including its surrounding park and farmland have been owned by the University of Cambridge since 1948, and still is today. It is now the official home of their Institute of Continuing Education. In addition to its extensive English gardens, the Madingley Hall estate includes 1150 acres of countryside which are maintained by the university.

== Cambridge American Cemetery and Memorial ==
The Cambridge American Cemetery and Memorial is a major military cemetery and memorial for American servicemen, dedicated in 1956. It is situated on the southern edge of the parish of Madingley and close to the city of Cambridge.

3,811 American military dead from World War II are buried in the cemetery. In addition, the names of 5,127 are inscribed on the Wall of the Missing, Americans who lost their lives but whose remains were never recovered or identified. Most of these died in the years-long Battle of the Atlantic or in the strategic air bombardment of Northwest Europe. The entire 30½ acres used for the American Cemetery and Memorial were donated to the United States government by the University of Cambridge following World War II.

== Village life ==
The village's former public house, The Three Horseshoes, is now a restaurant though it still has a bar that serves beer. The village has an independent pre-preparatory school which caters for reception to year-two students. There is also a village church, where services are held weekly. The church has a 12th-century canonical sundial on the south wall.

The village has two cricket teams, both playing in the Cambridgeshire Cricket Association leagues and one cricket team playing in the Cambridge Business House Midweek League.

== See also ==
- Madingley Road, an arterial road running from Madingley to Cambridge
