= Donald Beves =

English academic (1896–1961)

Donald Howard Beves (6 March 1896 – 6 July 1961) was an English academic whose subject was modern languages, and dean and later vice-provost of King's College, Cambridge.

== Life ==
Beves was the son of Edward Leslie Beves, a prosperous Brighton timber merchant, and was educated at Windlesham House School, Rugby School, and King's College, Cambridge. He gained a classics scholarship to King's in December 1914 but postponed his further education to serve with the Rifle Brigade during World War I. By 1919 he was a captain commanding the drill unit of the Central School of Instruction at Berkhamsted. That same year he took up his place at King's, where he graduated in 1922 with a First in the Classical Tripos and a Second in modern languages.

He became a clerk at the House of Commons, but after writing a thesis on the Holy Grail he was given a Fellowship of King's. In 1926 he was appointed as dean of the college and in 1946 as vice-provost. At his death in 1961, The Times said of him "although he wrote little, he delivered ... important lectures on sixteenth-century French literature". He was also chairman of the governing body of Trent College in Derbyshire.

Beves had considerable private means. He entertained lavishly and was one of the few fellows at Cambridge to drive a Rolls-Royce. He also produced many plays at Cambridge.

In June 1977, Peter Hennessy accused Beves of being the "fourth man" in the affair of Philby, Burgess, and Maclean. However, Geoffrey Grigson and others immediately leapt to the defence of Beves, considering him to be uninterested in politics. It later transpired that the role Hennessy suggested for Beves was that of Anthony Blunt.
