= Gerald Vesey =

Francis Gerald Vesey or Veasey (15 July 1832 – 18 March 1915) was a priest of the Church of England. He was the Archdeacon of Huntingdon from 1874 to 1915.

He was educated at Windlesham House School, Harrow and Trinity College, Cambridge, graduating BA in 1855 and MA in 1858. He was a curate at Great St Mary's, Cambridge and then Rector of St John's Huntingdon from 1858 to 1874 before becoming archdeacon of Huntingdon.
