= William Uthwatt =

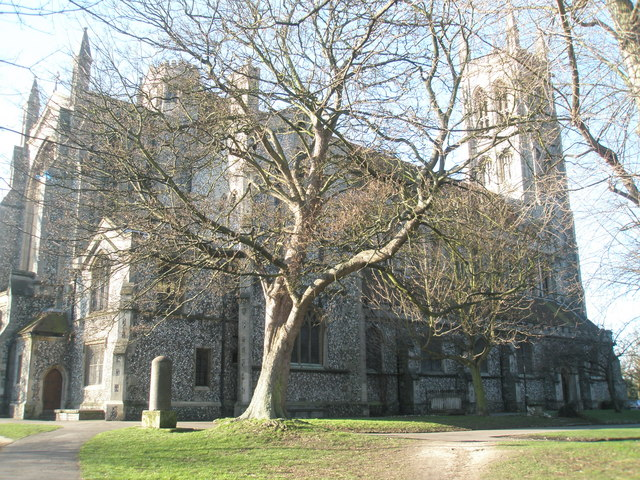
St Mary's Portsea

William Andrewes Uthwatt (1882 – 4 December 1952) was a priest of the Church of England. He was the Archdeacon of Huntingdon from 1943 to 1947.

== Life ==
Andrewes Uthwatt was born in Ballarat, the son of Thomas Andrewes, and educated at Trinity College, Cambridge. He was ordained in 1904 and was a curate at St Mary's Portsea. Later he was Archdeacon of Northern Melanesia and then a temporary chaplain to the British Armed Forces during World War I. When peace returned he was a curate at Southwell Minster and then held incumbencies in Derby, Bottisham, Brampton and finally Diddington.

Augustus Uthwatt, Baron Uthwatt, his brother, was a prominent judge.
