= College of St Hild and St Bede, Durham =

Constituent college of Durham University

College of St Hild and St Bede
- Durham University
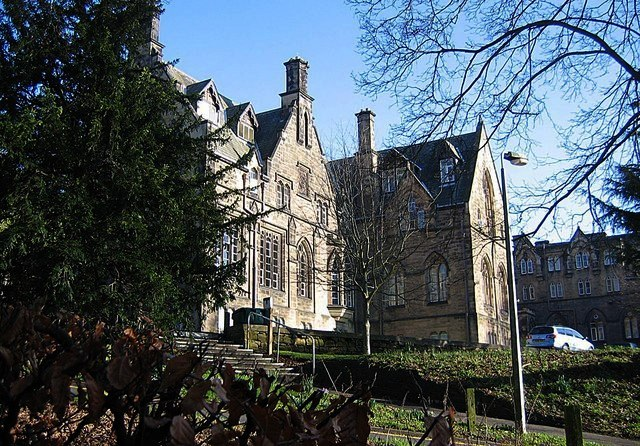
- Hild Main Building

- Arms of St Hild & St Bede; Arms: Argent on a Chevron Purpure three Ammonites of the first in base a Cross paty quadrate Gules a Chief Azure thereon between two Lions rampant Or a pale of the last charged with a Cross patonce also Azure
- Coordinates: 54.7775°N 1.564815°W
- Latin name: Collegium Sanctae Hildae et Beda Venerabilis
- Motto: Latin: Eadem mutata resurgo
- Motto in English: I rise again, changed but the same
- Established: 1975 (precursors in 1839 and 1858)
- Named for: The Venerable Bede & St Hild
- Principal: Simon Forrest
- Undergraduates: 1123
- Postgraduates: 111
- Senior tutor: Laura Todd
- Website: College of St Hild and St Bede
- SRC: Hild & Bede SRC
- Boat club: Hild Bede Boat Club

Map
- Location within Durham, England

The College of St Hild and St Bede, commonly known as Hild Bede, is a constituent college of Durham University in England. With over 1000 student members, the co-educational college was formed in 1975 by the merger of two much older single-sex institutions, the College of the Venerable Bede for men and St Hild's College for women.

Hild Bede is neither a Bailey nor a Hill college, but is situated on the banks of the River Wear between Durham's bailey and Gilesgate. Since 2024, the college has been based temporarily at Rushford Court whilst the riverside site is undergoing renovation.

== History ==
The College of the Venerable Bede, for men, was founded in 1839 with a small number of trainee schoolmasters. The college was expanded greatly over the next few decades with the assistance of trade unionist and future local MP William Crawford, who later became the college's treasurer. Its sister institution, St Hild's College, was opened for the education of women on an adjacent site in 1858. Both colleges initially specialised in teacher training, but in 1892 Bede, and in 1896 Hild, became associated with the federal University of Durham, offering BA and BSc degrees alongside teaching in education. Graduates of St Hild's were the first female graduates from Durham in 1898. The Chapel of the Venerable Bede, completed in 1939 to celebrate Bede College's centenary, was designed by the architectural partnership of Seely & Paget.

The two colleges retained links throughout the next century, with shared teaching and facilities. In the 1960s they constructed the shared Caedmon Complex. It was then decided that the colleges should be formally merged, and in 1975 they became the unitary College of St. Hild and St. Bede, a recognised college of the university. In 1979 Hild Bede joined the College Council, becoming a full constituent college of the university and ceasing to award its own PGCE qualifications. At this point some of the College buildings (including much of the teaching facilities of the Bede site) were occupied by the University's Department of Education, whilst the college centred its academic administration on the old St Hild's site.

== Buildings ==
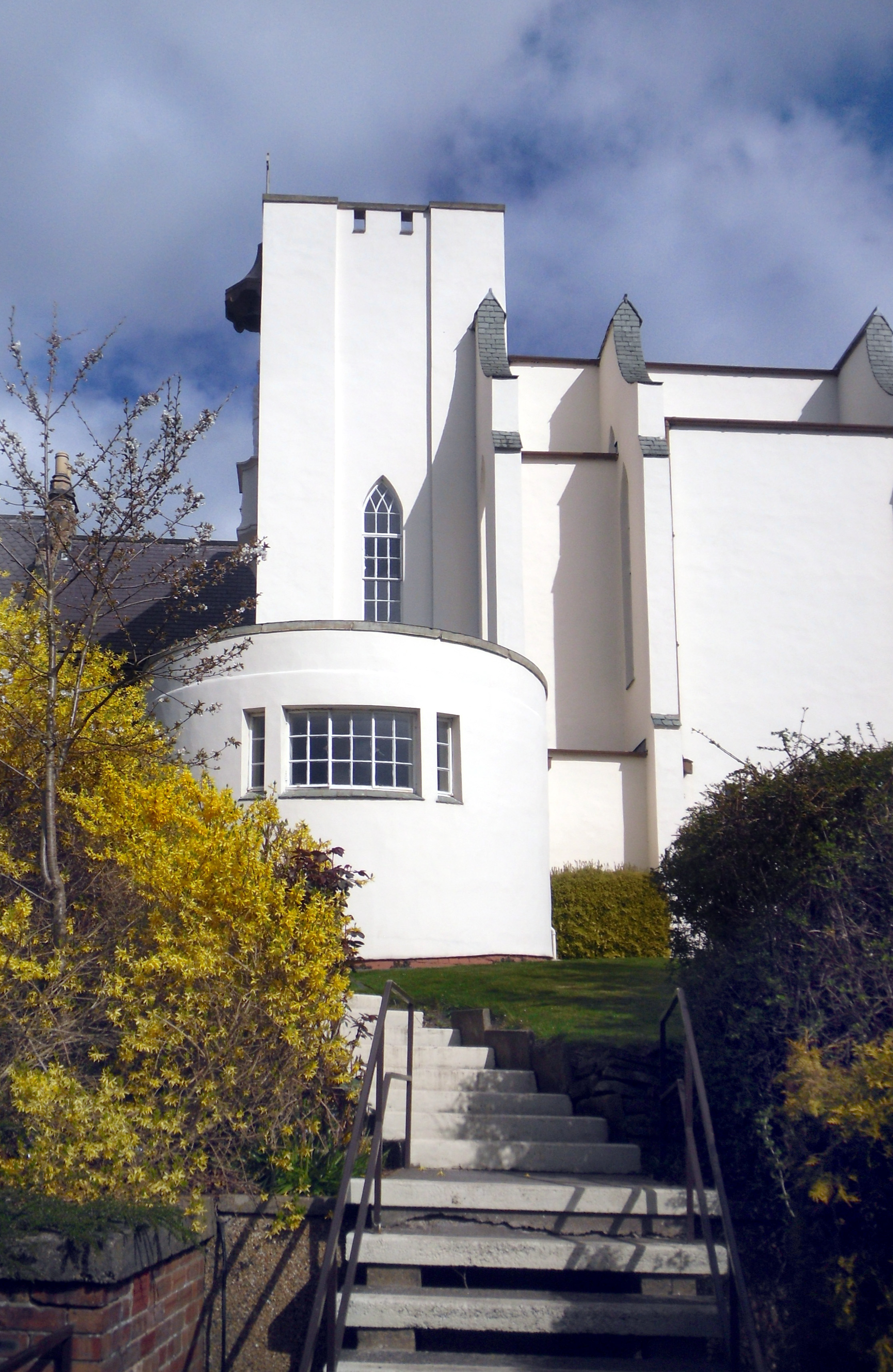
The Art Deco chapel of St Bede

=== College pre-renovation (1858–2024) ===
The original college consisted of several distinct buildings, including the main Hild building, which was the administrative hub of the college containing the main offices, computer room, common rooms and a large number of student rooms; other larger accommodation blocks, such as Thorp, Christopher, Bede; and several smaller houses such as Hild Gym, Bede Gym, Charles Stranks, Gables, Manor House, Manor Lodge, Belvedere, and, as of 2021, Ernest Place.

At the centre of college was the Caedmon Complex, which contains a dining hall, the bar (The Vernon Arms, named after the original Hild Bede Principal, Dr Vernon Armitage), music rooms and the only student-run cinema in Durham, Bede Film Society.

Hild Bede was also one of the two colleges in Durham to have two chapels, the other being University College. Following the merger of the colleges, the chapel of St. Hild was used as a function room named the Joachim Room. The Chapel of the Venerable Bede is still in use.

The college also maintains a boat house used by the boat club on the river near the Caedmon Complex. The old St Hild's boat house, 100 yards upstream, is now used by Collingwood College.

=== Rushford Court ===
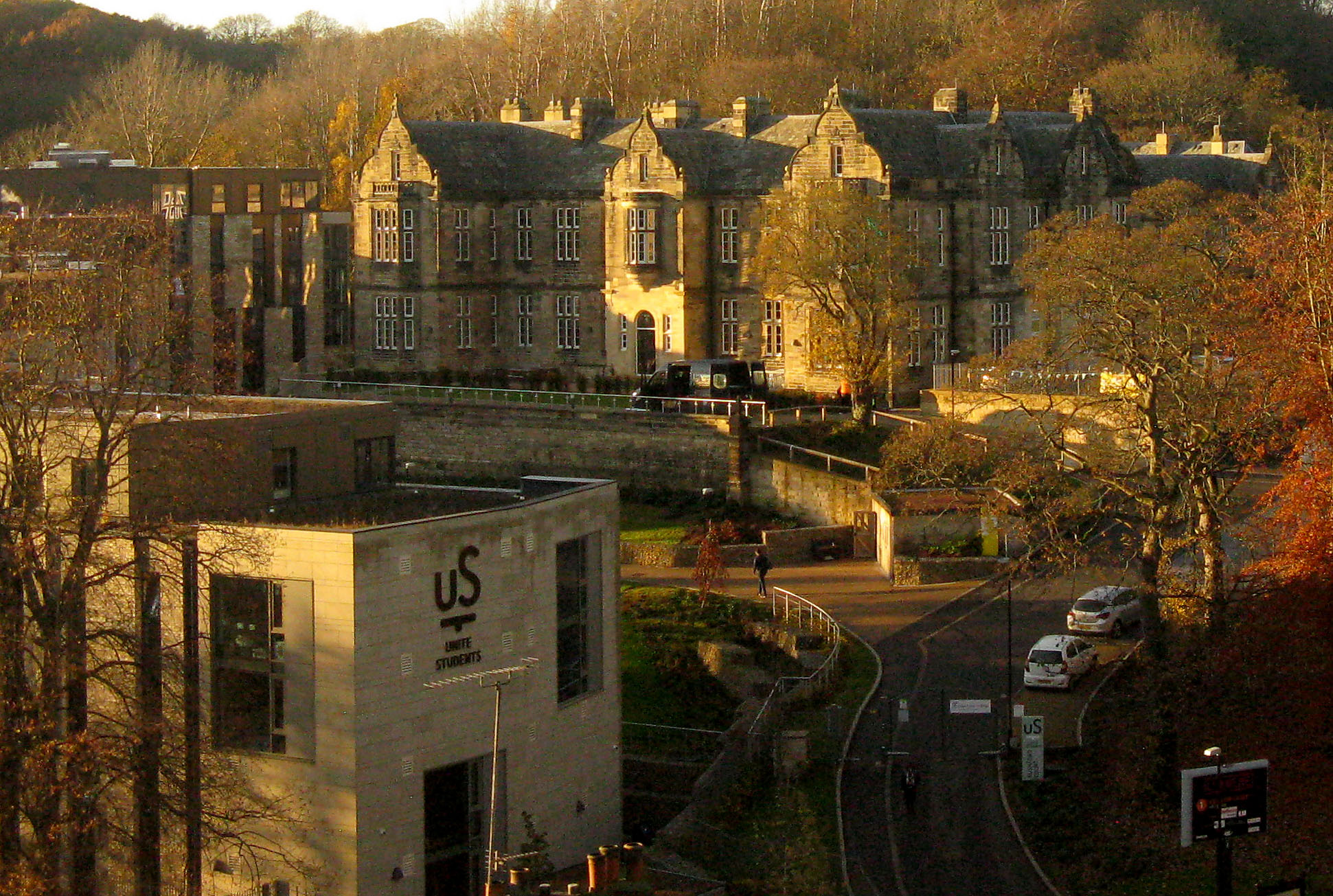
Rushford Court

From 2024, the college moved temporarily to the Rushford Court site, in Durham's viaduct area, to allow redevelopment of its historic Leazes Road site. The Rushford Court site is based around the Victorian buildings of the former County Hospital, with new accommodation blocks surrounding it. As part of the move, the University built a new 'Heart' building (named the 'new' Caedmon Complex) on the site to house further student spaces, including a bar, library, and study space. The college is expected to be based at Rushford Court until 2029.

== Traditions ==
=== Symbols ===
To maintain the history of the two original colleges, males in the college wear the Bede colours of light and dark blue, the colours that the college are more widely known for, whilst female colours are the green and lilac of the original Hild College. The College Arms also represents the history of the precursor colleges, with the chief taken directly from the Arms of the College of the Venerable Bede and the chevron being adapted from the bend of Arms of St. Hild College.

=== Gowns ===
The gowns worn by members of the college, retained from before the college became a constituent college of the university, differ from other Durham gowns in being made of brocaded fabric and being shorter. These are not worn at formal hall or matriculation (although gowns were once compulsory for matriculation). Formals are instead black tie events and happen around ten times a year, with both traditional formal dinners and themed formals such as for Halloween and St Patrick's Day. Whilst the college is based at Rushford Court, formals are held in other college dining halls on a rotational basis.

=== Anthem ===
The College's official anthem is 'Never Forget' by Take That, and is frequently thus performed by College staff during karaoke events, and played during formals.

=== College events ===
Like most Durham colleges, Hild Bede celebrates an annual college day, usually in early May, with Hild Bede being the first Durham college to stage such event. This day usually includes a champagne breakfast, a service in the cathedral, a formal lunch, picnics and barbecues on the grounds, and entertainment throughout the day including bands, fairground-style events, disco, ceilidh and college olympics.

In late April, the college is host to the sounding retreat ceremony in conjunction with the Durham Light Infantry Association. Initially instituted to remember students and staff of the Bede College Company who lost their lives at the Second Battle of Ypres, it now commemorates all former members of the college who have died in conflicts around the world.

The college also hosts two annual balls, the Winter Ball at the end of Michaelmas Term and the Summer Ball after exams have finished. Since 2024 these events have been held externally at venues such as Lumley Castle, Beamish Hall, and Wynyard Hall.

== Student Representative Council ==
Unlike most colleges of the university, the student body is not divided into Junior and Middle Common Rooms, instead both the undergraduate and postgraduate communities are represented by a single Student Representative Council (SRC). The SRC does however contain a special postgraduate committee and maintains the physical Junior and Middle Common Rooms, both in the Hild Building. The SRC is run by an elected exec that is headed by a sabbatical president. The college also has a Senior Common Room (SCR) consisting of the college tutors, past and current members of college staff and invited members of the wider community.

=== Executive Committee ===
The running of the SRC is undertaken primarily by the Hild Bede SRC executive committee, a group of elected student volunteers headed up by a sabbatical and salaried President. The other "exec" roles are as follows: Social Secretary, Vice President, Postgraduate President, Treasurer, Chairperson, Communities and Liberations Officer, two Welfare Officers, International Officer, Publicity Officer, Ball Officer, Sports and Societies Officer, Environment Officer, and Technical Officer.

== Student life ==
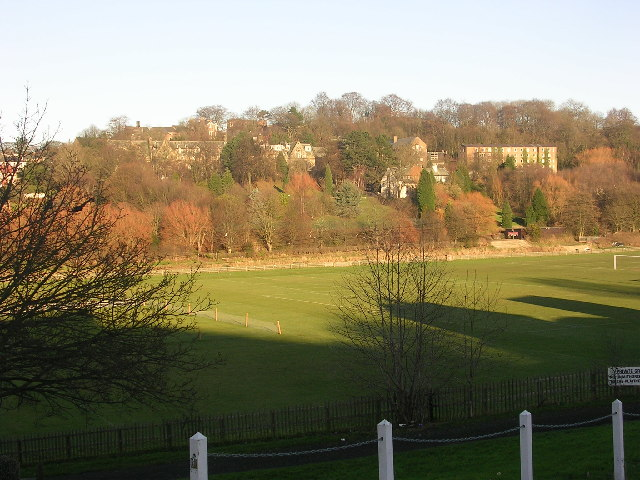
Playing fields of the College.

=== Sport ===
Hild Bede AFC are the college football club and is the college's largest sports club with seven teams playing every-weekend in term time.

The college's affiliated rugby teams are Bede RFC (the men's team, playing in the traditional Bede College colours of light and dark blue) and Hild RFC (the women's team, playing in the traditional St Hild's College colours of green, purple and white).

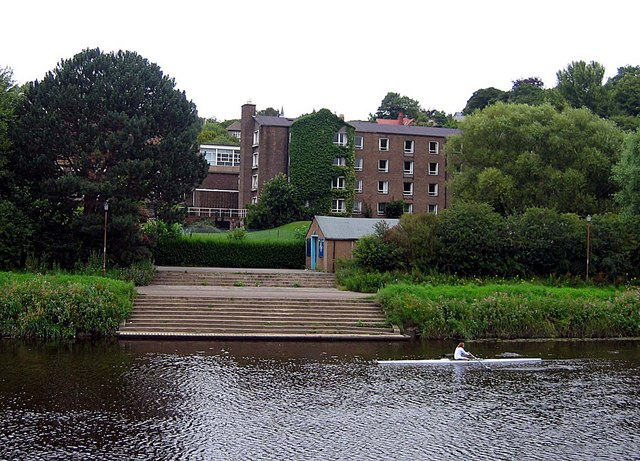
Hild Bede Boathouse on the River Wear with Thorp House behind it

Hild Bede Boat Club (HBBC) is the college rowing club, and qualified for Henley Royal Regatta in 2010, 2011, 2012, 2015 and 2016.

HBBC is a registered Boat Club through British Rowing, with Boat Code "SHB" and is a member organisation of Durham College Rowing.

The college has several other sports clubs which compete against other colleges and has seen recent successes in squash, cricket, and hockey.

=== Mascot ===
The official Hild Bede college animal is the bear, and the mascot of Hild Bede SRC is "Bedo", whose named is based on "Bede", from the college's name. The maintenance and grooming of Bedo is undertaken by the SRC Publicity Officer.

=== Theatre ===
Hild Bede Theatre is the biggest college drama society in Durham and puts on at least three productions annually, including a musical at the beginning of the third term. In 2009–10 they won two Durham Oscars, "best college play" for Who's Afraid of Virginia Woolf? and "Best college musical" for 42nd Street. They have won the latter more times than any other Durham theatre group, having won for the last 7 years in a row. In 2024, they performed Grease which won "Best College Musical".

=== Cinema ===
Hild Bede houses the only student cinema in Durham, Bede Film Society - which is Durham's oldest and cheapest cinema. The society used to showcase recent films on a 35mm projector, but, in celebration of the Bede Film Society's 50th anniversary, has since installed a new digital projector funded by £40,000 of alumni donations, with Dolby Digital surround sound. Films are shown on most weekends of term, with the occasional midweek showing. The society was started over fifty years ago, before the merging of the two colleges, showing films on a 16mm projector.

=== Bar Quiz ===
Every Thursday, except during formal dinners, Hild Bede's bar, "the Vern", hosts its famous bar quiz, traditionally consisting of 50 questions on various topics. The winning team receives a £20 bar tab. Nowadays, the final round of the quiz is always a "Wipeout" round. In this round, answering a question incorrectly results in "wiping out" and thus receiving 0 points for the entire round. The Bar Quiz exists under the jurisdiction of the SRC Entertainment's Committee (Ents Comm) and thus is overseen by the Social Secretary of the SRC, although it is also often set up by the SRC Tech Officer. In addition, it has been known for the Social Secretary to appoint a "Head of Quizzes", from within Ents Comm, to help run these events. While the Social Secretary can wear what they like, it is customary and expected for the Head of Quizzes to wear their official royal blue Hild Bede sweatshirt.

=== Awards ===
Each year, several members of the college are awarded the Ann Boynton Award for outstanding contribution to college, for those who embody the spirit of the college whilst maintaining outstanding academic excellence. Winners of the Ann Boynton Award have their name permanently engraved into a board listing all the winners of the award, and the board is hung inside the Vern.

Another award is the Honorary Lifetime Membership award, given by the SRC President to those deemed to have contributed a great deal to college life. There is also the Senior Common Room Award, which is granted to a first year student who college staff believe has contributed significantly to the college.

=== List of Principals ===
College of the Venerable Bede

- John Cundill 1841-1852 (not listed on the reception board but named in Durham County Advertiser 5 March 1852 p. 8)
- J. G. Cromwell 1852–1861 (the board in reception says 1853, but the appointment of Cromwell started the year earlier: see Durham County Advertiser 5 March 1852 p. 8)
- Arthur Rawson Ashwell 1861–1881
- S. Barradell Smith 1881–1886
- T. Randell 1886–1892
- S. Barradell Smith 1892–1896
- G. H. S. Walpole 1896–1905
- D. Jones 1905–1925
- E. F. Braley 1925–1947
- G. E. Brigstocke 1948–1959
- K. G. Collier 1959–1975

St. Hild's College

- C. W. King 1862–1864
- Canon W. H. Walter 1864–1889
- Canon J. Haworth 1889–1910
- E. Chrisopher 1910–1933
- A. Lawrence 1933–1951
- N. Joachim 1951–1975

College of St Hild and St Bede

- J. Vernon Armitage 1975 to 1997
- D. J. Davies 1997–2000
- J. Alan Pearson 2000–2008
- C. J. Hutchison 2008–2012
- L. Worden 2012–2013
- C. J. Hutchison 2013–2014
- A. Darnell 2014–2015
- J. Clarke 2015–2019
- S. Forrest 2019–Present

== Notable alumni ==
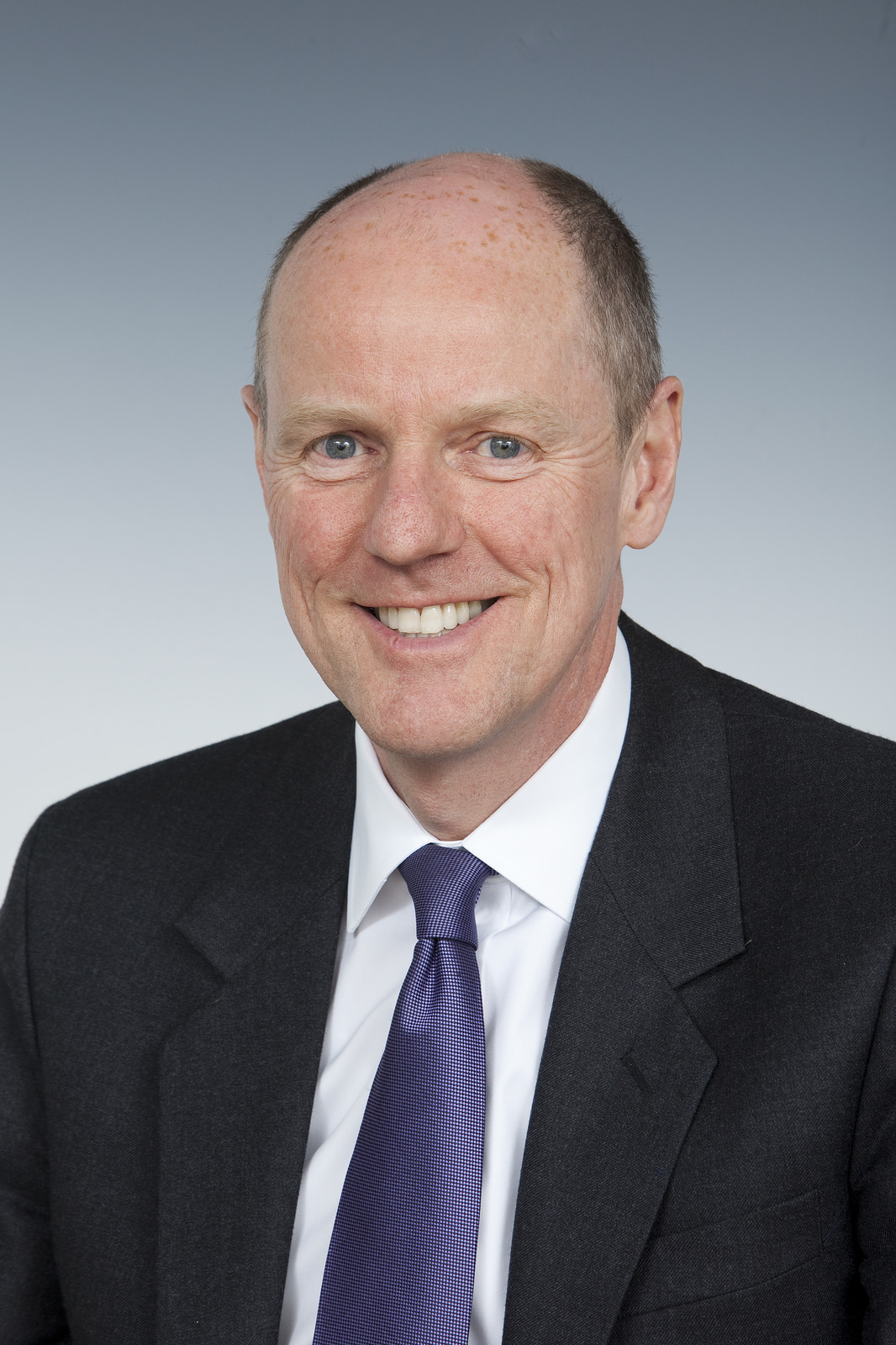
Nick Gibb, Conservative Member of Parliament

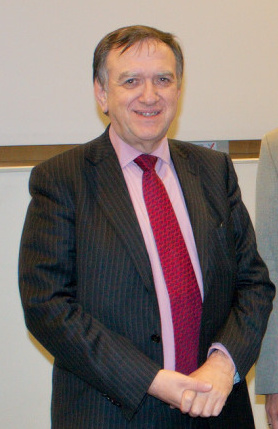
Robert Burgess, British sociologist and academic

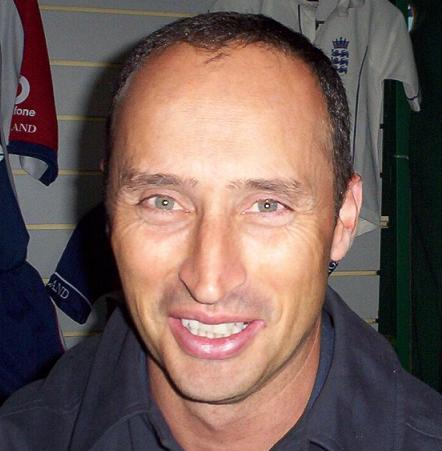
Nasser Hussain, former English cricketer who captained the England cricket team from 1999 to 2003

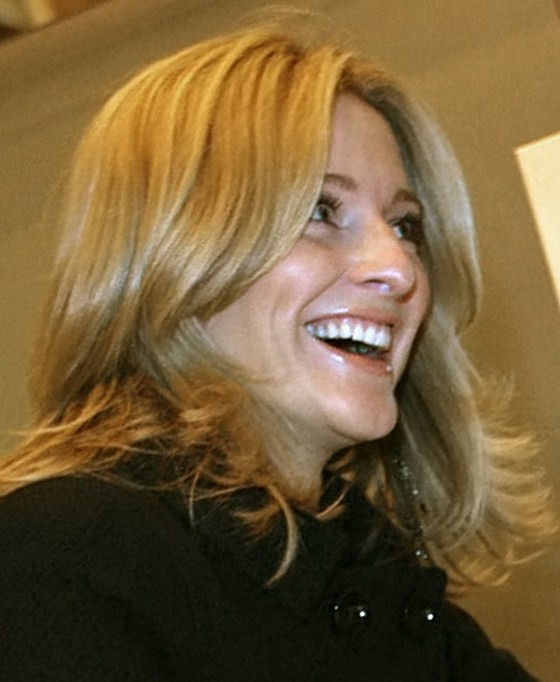
Gabby Logan, British presenter and a former Wales international gymnast

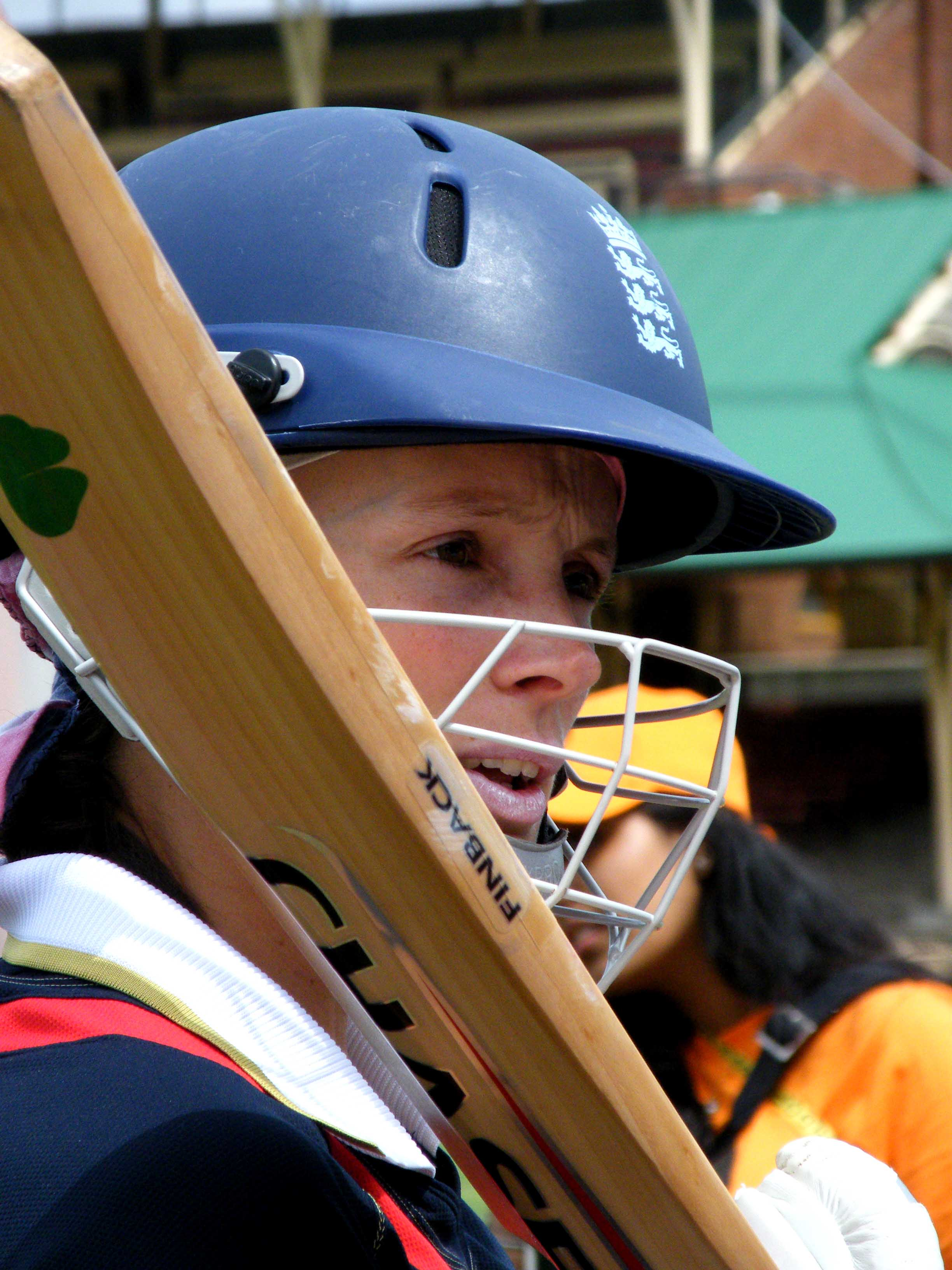
Caroline Atkins, English cricketer

=== Bede ===
The College of the Venerable Bede's coat of arms

- Paul Allott, Lancashire and England cricketer (1970s)
- Steve Atkinson Durham, the Netherlands and Hong Kong cricketer (1970s)
- Sir Robert Burgess, Vice-Chancellor of Leicester University since 1999 (1968–1971)
- Jack Cunningham, a British Labour politician, who was the Member of Parliament for Copeland from 1983 to 2005, and previously served in the Cabinet. Received a BSc in Chemistry in 1962, and a PhD in 1967. (1959–1967)
- Jack Dormand, a British educationist and Labour Party politician (1937–1939)
- Graeme Fowler, Lancashire, Durham and England cricketer and now the University's Senior Cricket Coach (1970s)
- Bob Hesford, Bristol, Gloucestershire and England rugby union (1970)
- John Taylor Hughes, Anglican Suffragan Bishop of Croydon 1956-1977 (1920s)
- Bellerby Lowerison, educationist and school founder.
- Gehan Mendis, Sussex and Lancashire cricketer (1970s)
- Sir Fergus Montgomery, politician and former aide to Margaret Thatcher (1947-1950)
- Fred Peart, Member of Parliament for Workington (1945–1976), who served in the Labour governments of the 1960s and 1970s (1934–1936)
- Patrick Ryecart, actor (never graduated) (1970–1971)
- Graham Savage, civil servant and educationist
- Edward Short, Baron Glenamara, Labour Member of Parliament for Newcastle upon Tyne Central (1951–1976)
- Jock Wishart, best known for setting a new world record for circumnavigation of the globe in a powered vessel and for organising and leading the Polar Race. (1971–1974)

=== Hild ===
St Hild's College coat of arms

- Mary Stewart (née Rainbow), novelist (student 1935–1941; Assistant Lecturer 1941–1945; part-time lecturer 1948–1956)
- Margaret Gibb OBE (1892–1984) trained here as a teacher. She was the Labour Party's organiser in the North East for 27 years.

=== Hild Bede ===
- Caroline Atkins, England cricketer (1990s)
- Mark Bailey, former English national rugby union player, he was previously professor of Later Medieval History at the University of East Anglia (1978–1981)
- Andrew Cantrill, organist and choral director (1987–1991), organ scholar during his time at the college.
- Nick Gibb, the Conservative Member of Parliament for Bognor Regis and Littlehampton. Gibb also holds the post of Minister of State for Schools in the Department for Education coalition government (2010–2012, 2014-present). (1978–1981)
- Chris Hollins, broadcaster and winner of Strictly Come Dancing 2009 (1990–1993)
- Nasser Hussain, former captain of the English cricket team (1986–1989)
- Gabby Logan, television presenter and 1990 Commonwealth Games gymnast (1991–1995), Deputy SRC President in her final year.
- Stuart MacRae, composer (1993–1997)
- Edward Marriott, psychotherapist and author
- Emmanuel de Merode, Belgian prince and director of Virunga National Park in the Democratic Republic of Congo
- Mark Rylands, the Bishop of Shrewsbury (1979–1982)
- Rupert Whitaker, founder and chairman of the Tuke Institute and co-founder of the Terence Higgins Trust (1981)
- Matt Windows, Gloucestershire cricketer (1990s)
- Will Fletcher, GB Lightweight rower and Lead coach at DUBC
- Callum McBrierty, GB Rower
