= Leslie Lloyd Rees =

- Bishop of Shrewsbury
- Diocese: Diocese of Lichfield
- In office: 1980–1986
- Predecessor: Francis Cocks
- Successor: John Davies
- Other posts: Honorary assistant bishop in Winchester (1987–2004); Honorary Chaplain to the Queen (1971–1980); Chaplain-General of Prisons (1962–1980)

Orders
- Ordination: 1942 (deacon); 1943 (priest)
- Consecration: 1980

Personal details
- Born: 14 April 1919
- Died: 4 July 2013 (aged 94)
- Denomination: Anglican
- Parents: Rees Thomas & Elizabeth
- Spouse: Rosamond Smith (m. 1944; d. 1989)
- Children: 2 sons (1 d.)
- Profession: Prison chaplain
- Education: Kelham Theological College

Leslie Lloyd Rees (properly surnamed Lloyd-Rees, but sometimes called Rees; 14 April 1919 – 4 July 2013) was variously Honorary Chaplain to the Queen, Chaplain-General of Prisons and Anglican Bishop of Shrewsbury.

Rees was educated at Kelham Theological College. He was made deacon at Michaelmas 1942 (20 September) and ordained priest the Michaelmas following (18 September 1943) — both times by John Morgan, Bishop of Llandaff at Llandaff Cathedral. after a brief curacy at St Saviour, Roath, he embarked on a long career as a Prison Chaplain: he was successively Chaplain at Cardiff, Durham, Dartmoor and Winchester. In 1962 he was appointed to the head of the service (Chaplain-General of Prisons), a post he held until his appointment to the episcopate 18 years later. He was also appointed honorary Canon of Canterbury Cathedral in 1966. He was consecrated a bishop on 3 November 1980, by Robert Runcie, Archbishop of Canterbury, at Westminster Abbey. He became a Chaplain of the Order of St John (ChStJ).

In retirement he was an honorary assistant bishop in the Diocese of Winchester, having settled in Alresford, Hampshire. and served as a member of the Parole Board for England and Wales from 1987 to 1990.

Later in retirement he moved to a retirement home at Blackwater, Isle of Wight where he died in July 2013, aged 94.

Church of England titles
Preceded by Hugh Smith	Chaplain-General of Prisons; 1962–1980	Succeeded by Percy Ashford
Preceded by Francis Cocks	Bishop of Shrewsbury; 1980–1986	Succeeded by John Davies
