= Robert Hodson (disambiguation) =

Robert Hodson (1885–1960) was an English bishop.

Robert Hodson may also refer to:

- Robert Hodson (MP) for Winchester (UK Parliament constituency)
- Several of the Hodson baronets, were named Robert Hodson
