= Bishop of Shrewsbury =

Bishop of Shrewsbury may refer to:

- Anglican Bishop of Shrewsbury, an area bishop in the Diocese of Lichfield
- Catholic Bishop of Shrewsbury, the ordinary of the Latin Catholic Diocese of Shrewsbury
