= Margaret Gibb =

English political activist (1892–1984)

- Born: Margaret Hunter Harrison; 31 July 1892; Dunston
- Died: 27 January 1984 (aged 91); Hexham
- Occupation: activist
- Known for: North East organiser of the Labour Party
- Political party: Labour Party
- Spouse: Tom Gibb

Margaret Hunter Gibb born Margaret Hunter Harrison (31 July 1892 – 27 January 1984) was a British political activist for the Labour Party in the North East of England.

== Life ==
Gibb was born in Dunston near Gateshead in 1892. Her parents were Susan (born Hunter) and William Harrison. Her father was a commercial traveller.

She was educated at Blaydon secondary school followed by St Hild's in Durham where she qualified as a teacher. She was opposed to the First World War and she would not take part in Empire Day celebrations. She joined the Labour party and the Independent Labour Party.

In 1927 her husband of just four years died. He had been the Labour Party's agent in Sheffield and she took his vacant job. In 1929 she became an elected politician when she was a successful candidate to serve on Sheffield City Council. She joined the Education committee but in 1930 she resigned to work again for the Labour Party. She became their organiser in Durham, Northumberland, and Yorkshire responsible for over eighty constituencies. She decided to concentrate on the role of women. Some women had the vote in 1918, but it was not until 1928 that all adult women had the vote in Britain. She organised education and social events intended to be of interest to women. Social events included dances, plays, sports events and whist drives, while the education included a week each year when lectures were offered.

She served for 27 years as the Labour Party's organiser in constituencies in Durham, Northumberland, and Yorkshire until 1957.

== Death and legacy ==
Gibb died in Hexham hospital in 1984. Northumberland archives hold a recording she made in 1983 about her work.

== Private life ==
She married in 1923 to Tom Gibb. He died in 1927. They had no children.
