= William Noblett =

Irish-born Archdeacon

The Venerable William Alexander Noblett, CBE (born 16 April 1953) is an Irish retired Anglican priest, author and manager. He was Chaplain-General of Prisons from 2001 to 2011.

The Venerable Noblett was educated at The High School, Dublin, Southampton University, and Salisbury & Wells Theological College, with a B.Th. from Southampton in 1978, graduating with an M.Th. in Applied Theology at Oxford University in 1998. He was ordained deacon in 1978 and priest in 1979. After a curacy in Sholing he served the Church of Ireland as the Rector of Ardamine Union in the Republic of Ireland from 1980 to 1982. He was a Chaplain in the RAF from 1982 to 1984; and Vicar of St Thomas, Middlesbrough from 1984 to 1987.

In the late 1980s he entered the chaplaincy service of HM Prisons. Noblett was a chaplain at Wakefield, Norwich and Full Sutton prisons 1987-2001, before becoming Chaplain General and Archdeacon of Prisons. The Venerable Noblett was a Canon and Prebend of York Minster from 2001 to 2012, and is a Canon Emeritus; an Honorary Canon of Liverpool Cathedral from 2009 to 2012; and was a Chaplain to the Sovereign from 2005 until 2023. He was made a CBE in the New Year's Honours List 2012 for his services to the prison service. He received the 2013 Perrie Award for his 'outstanding contribution to the criminal justice system'. During his time as a prison chaplain, he authored "Prayers for People in Prison" (OUP 1998) and as Chaplain General revised and updated it as "Inside Faith: praying for people in prison" (DLT 2009).

In 2009 the Venerable Noblett was made an Honorary Life Member of the American Correctional Chaplains Association in recognition of his leadership. At the conclusion of the Venerable Noblett's term as Chaplain General, which saw him criticised for a perceived condescending attitude towards traditional religious belief, the Church of England faced the possible loss of the Chaplain General's position.

Church of England titles
Preceded by David Fleming	Chaplain-General and Archdeacon of Prisons; 2001–2011	Succeeded by Mike Kavanagh
