= St Olaf's Church, Poughill =

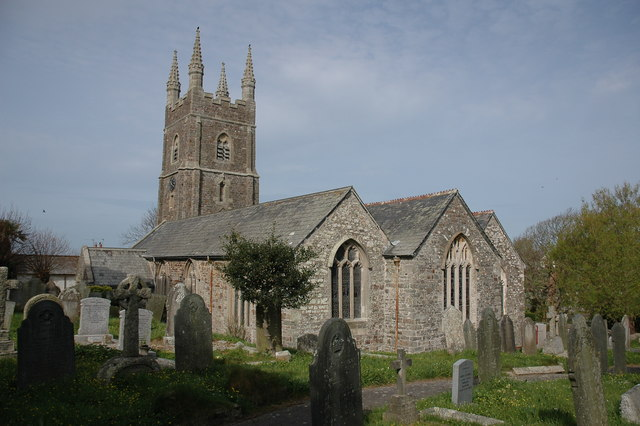
- St Olaf’s Church, Poughill
- St Olaf's Church, Poughill
- 50°50′30.58″N 4°31′31.17″W
- Location: Poughill
- Country: Great Britain
- Denomination: Church of England
- Churchmanship: Conservative Evangelical

History
- Dedication: St Olaf

Administration
- Province: Province of Canterbury
- Diocese: Diocese of Truro
- Archdeaconry: Bodmin
- Deanery: Stratton
- Parish: Poughill
- Location within Cornwall

Listed Building – Grade I
- Official name: Church of St Olaf
- Designated: 5 March 1952
- Reference no.: 1328522

St Olaf's Church is a Church of England parish church in Poughill, Bude, Cornwall. It is a Grade I listed building.

== History ==
The font dates to the 13th century. The south aisle dates to the 14th and 15th centuries. The porch and west tower are dated to the 15th century. The studded door is dated to the 16th century.

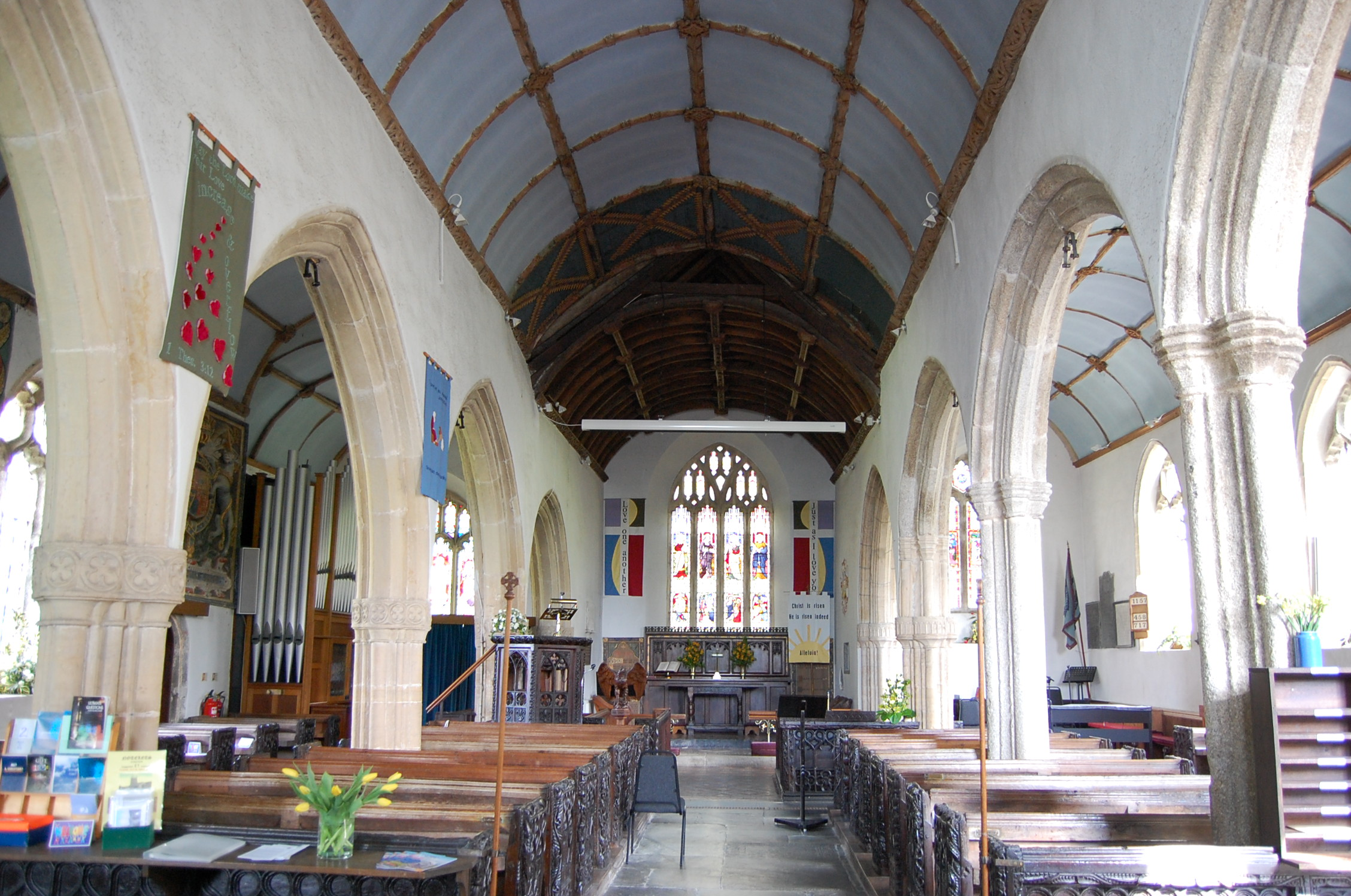
Interior

The church seats 300 persons and is dedicated to the Norwegian King and so-called Martyr, St Olaf (Olaf II of Norway). At the restoration in 1928 the foundations of the original Norman church were uncovered but nothing of this remains above ground. The pillars on the north side and south arch of the nave are of Caen stone (14th century); those of the south side are granite (15th century). The piscina and aumbry in the south chancel are 13th century.

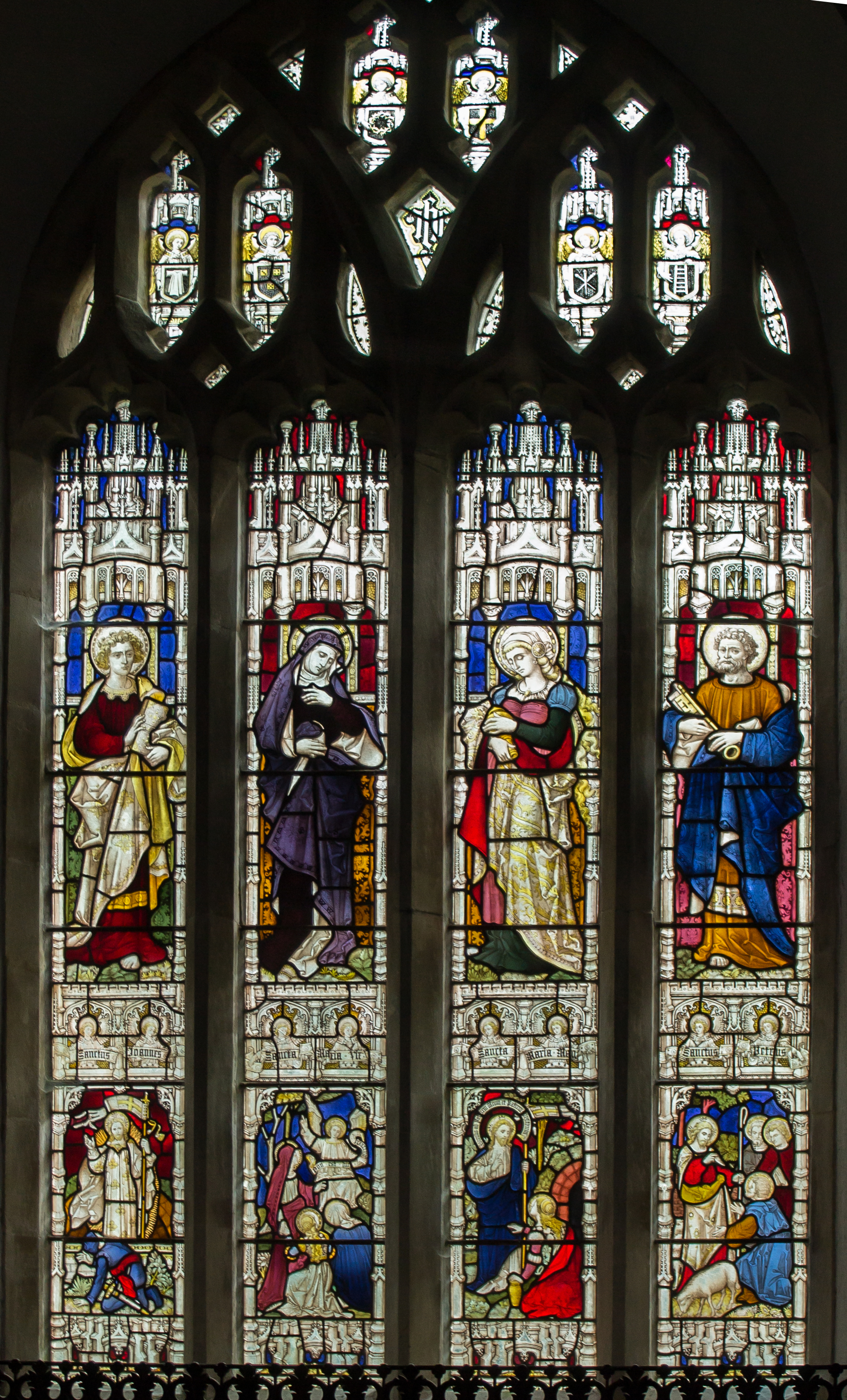
Stained-glass window

Inside the church is a wall of frescoes. The frescoes date from about 1470, and depict St Christopher: they were discovered in 1894 beneath the whitewash. Such paintings were once common in churches; the Poughill accounts record the washing-out of the figures in 1550 at the time of the Reformation in the reign of King Edward VI. According to the legend, St Christopher was a heathen giant who, on turning Christian, was instructed by a holy hermit to carry travellers over a dangerous ford, and who, one stormy night carried the child Jesus on his shoulder.

== Organ ==
A specification of the organ can be found on the National Pipe Organ Register.

== Vicars ==
The Ven. Percy Ashford was Vicar of Poughill before he became Chaplain General of Prisons.
