= Keith Pound =

The Venerable Keith Salisbury Pound (born 1933) is an Anglican priest: he was Chaplain-General of Prisons from 1986 to 1993.

The Venerable Pound was educated at St Catharine's College, Cambridge and ordained in 1958. After a curacy at St Peter he was Training Officer of Hollowford Training Centre in Sheffield; and then its Warden. He was Rector of Holy Trinity, Southwark from 1968 and Rural Dean of Newington from 1974 to 1978. He was Team Rector of Thamesmead from 1978 until his time with the prison service. He was an Honorary Chaplain to the Queen from 1988 to 2003.

Church of England titles
Preceded by Percival Leonard Ashford	Chaplain-General of Prisons; 1986–1993	Succeeded by David Fleming
