= Alan Smith (bishop) =

British Anglican bishop and Lord Spiritual (born 1957)

The Right Reverend Alan Smith
- Bishop of St Albans
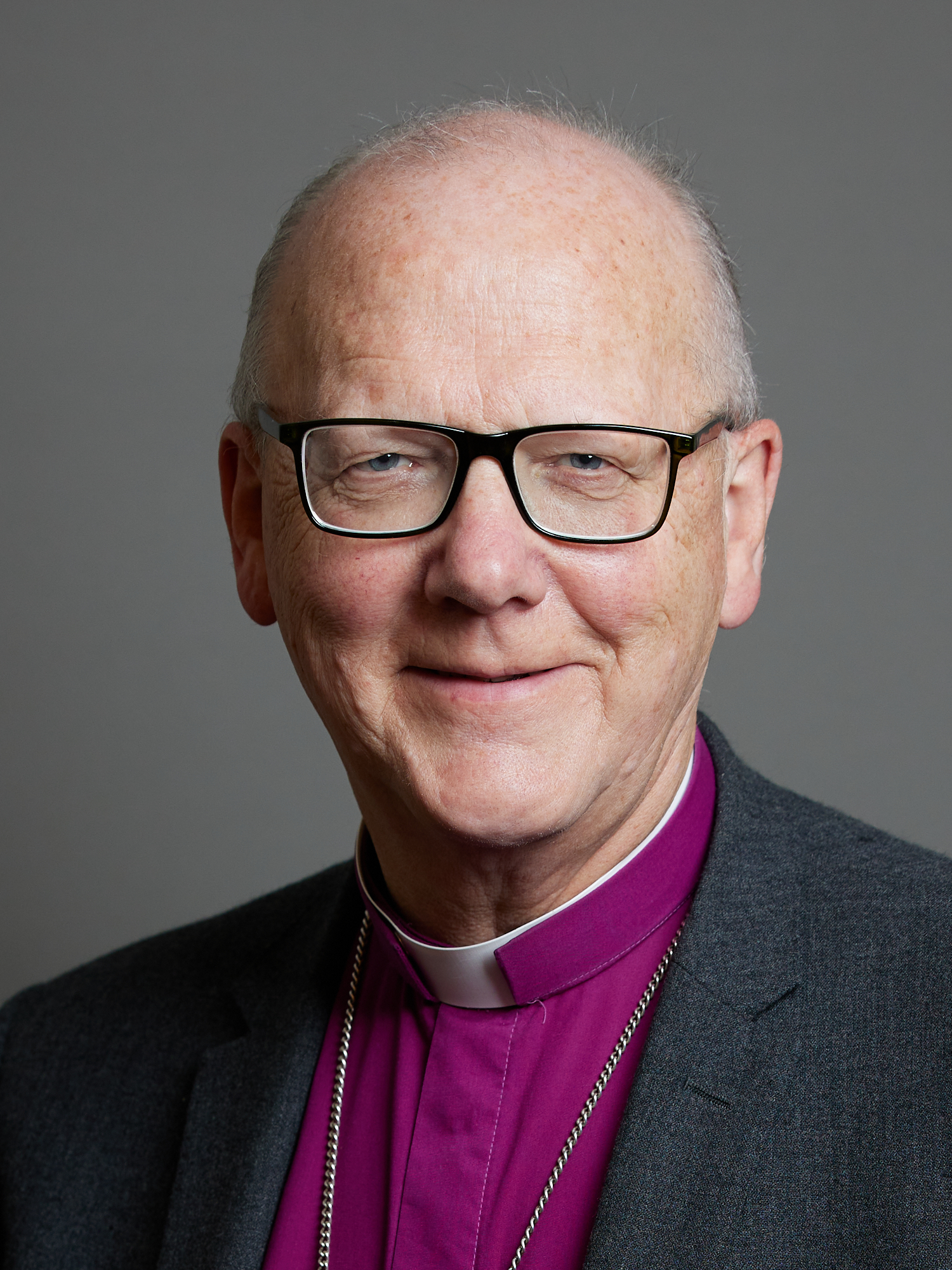
- Official portrait, 2021
- Diocese: Diocese of St Albans
- In office: 2009–2025
- Predecessor: Christopher Herbert
- Successor: Andrew Paul Rumsey
- Other posts: area Bishop of Shrewsbury (2001–2009); Archdeacon of Stoke (1997–2001)

Orders
- Ordination: 1981 (deacon); 1982 (priest) by Geoffrey Paul
- Consecration: December 2001 by George Carey

Personal details
- Born: 14 February 1957 (age 69)
- Denomination: Anglican
- Residence: Abbey Gate House, St Albans
- Education: University of Birmingham

Convenor of the Lords Spiritual
- In office 23 September 2022 – 31 May 2025
- Preceded by: David Urquhart
- Succeeded by: David Walker

Member of the House of Lords
- Lord Spiritual
- Bishop of St Albans; 4 November 2013 – 31 May 2025

Alan Gregory Clayton Smith (born 14 February 1957) is a British retired Anglican bishop. From 2009 until 2025, he was the Bishop of St Albans; from 2001 to 2009, he served as the area Bishop of Shrewsbury.

== Early life ==
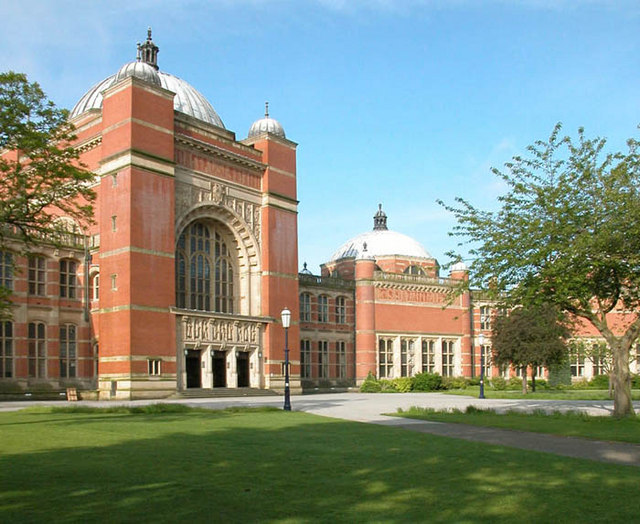
Birmingham University

Smith was born on 14 February 1957, to Frank Eric Smith and Rosemary Clayton Smith. His family is originally from Trowbridge and Westbury, Wiltshire. He was educated at Trowbridge High School.

Smith studied theology at the University of Birmingham, and graduated with a Bachelor of Arts (BA) degree in 1981 and a Master of Arts (MA) degree in 1982. His master's thesis was titled "The Poetic Art of the Hebrew Prophets". From 1979 to 1981, he trained for ordination at Wycliffe Hall, Oxford, an evangelical Anglican theological college. He undertook postgraduate research at the University of Wales, Bangor, and graduated with a Doctor of Philosophy (PhD) degree in 2002. His doctoral thesis was titled "The nature and significance of religion among adolescents in the Metropolitan Borough of Walsall".

== Ordained ministry ==
After ordination as a deacon at Petertide 1981 (on 28 June in Bradford Cathedral) and as a priest the Petertide following (27 June 1982 at Christ Church, Skipton) — both times by Geoffrey Paul, Bishop of Bradford, he began his career as assistant curate at St Lawrence and St Paul Pudsey. In 1982 he was ordained a priest at Christ Church, Skipton. In 1984 he took up the post as chaplain of the Lee Abbey Community near Lynton in North Devon where he had particular responsibility for mission and the creative arts. In 1989 he was appointed as the Diocesan Missioner and Executive Secretary of the Board for Mission and Unity for the Diocese of Lichfield and finally in 1997 (before his ordination as a bishop) Archdeacon of Stoke. While archdeacon he chaired the North Staffordshire Faiths in Friendship. He was a member of the General Synod of the Church of England from 1999.

=== Episcopal ministry ===
He was consecrated a bishop by George Carey, Archbishop of Canterbury at Westminster Abbey on 6 December 2001, becoming the Bishop of Shrewsbury (one of the suffragan sees in the Diocese of Lichfield). He was chair of the Shropshire Strategic Partnership from 2006 to 2009. and was a member of the Rural Bishops' Panel from 2006 to 2009. In 2002 he completed his PhD as an external student of the University of Wales (Bangor). For Lent 2006 Smith committed himself to living on the minimum wage.

His election as Bishop of St Albans by the College of Canons of the Cathedral took place on 13 February 2009, and the confirmation of his election followed on 31 March. Smith's inauguration took place on 19 September 2009. In January 2025, it was announced that he would retire as diocesan bishop on 31 May 2025.

From 2009 to 2011 he was joint chairman of the Anglican Methodist Working Party on the Ecclesiology of Emerging Expressions of Church which produced the report Fresh Expression in the Mission of the Church (2012). For the centenary of the newly reconfigured Diocese of St Albans in 2014 he wrote Saints and Pilgrims in the Diocese of St Albans (2013).

On 4 November 2013 he took his seat in the House of Lords as one of the Lords Spiritual. He has spoken on a wide range of subjects in Parliament with a particular focus on rural matters, agriculture, housing, welfare, and problem gambling. He is President of the Rural Coalition. On 23 September 2022, he was appointed Convenor of the Lords Spiritual.

He is also the patron of the Mission Direct charity in Hertfordshire.

== Views ==
Smith is concerned about fixed odds gambling machines which fuel problem gambling, leading to people losing their homes, their savings and sometimes taking their own lives. Smith blames the UK government for not limiting the amount people can gamble on those machines to £2, Smith stated the government delay was out of step with, "politicians and campaigners [who] are united in seeking the earliest possible introduction of the maximum £2 stake for FOBTs which will alleviate some of the devastating consequences of people addicted to gambling on them, some who can lose their homes and savings to them and then take their lives in desperation. Bookmakers taking huge profits and football clubs taking sponsorship from gambling and leaving the NHS to pick up the bill and families to face grief is privatising profit and nationalising consequences. It has to stop." Smith also stated, "I am not anti-business. I am pro-victims. I am angry about impunity."

== Honours ==
In 2010, Smith was awarded an honorary Doctor of Divinity (DD) degree by the University of Birmingham.

== Selected works ==
He has contributed chapters to Changing Rural Life (2004) and Celebrating Community: God's Gift for Today's World (2006). He has written Growing up in Multi-faith Britain: Explorations in Youth, Ethnicity and Religion (2007), God-Shaped Mission: A Perspective from the Rural Church (2008), and co-authored The Reflective Leader (2011). He was joint editor of Faith and the Future of the Countryside (2012).

== Styles ==
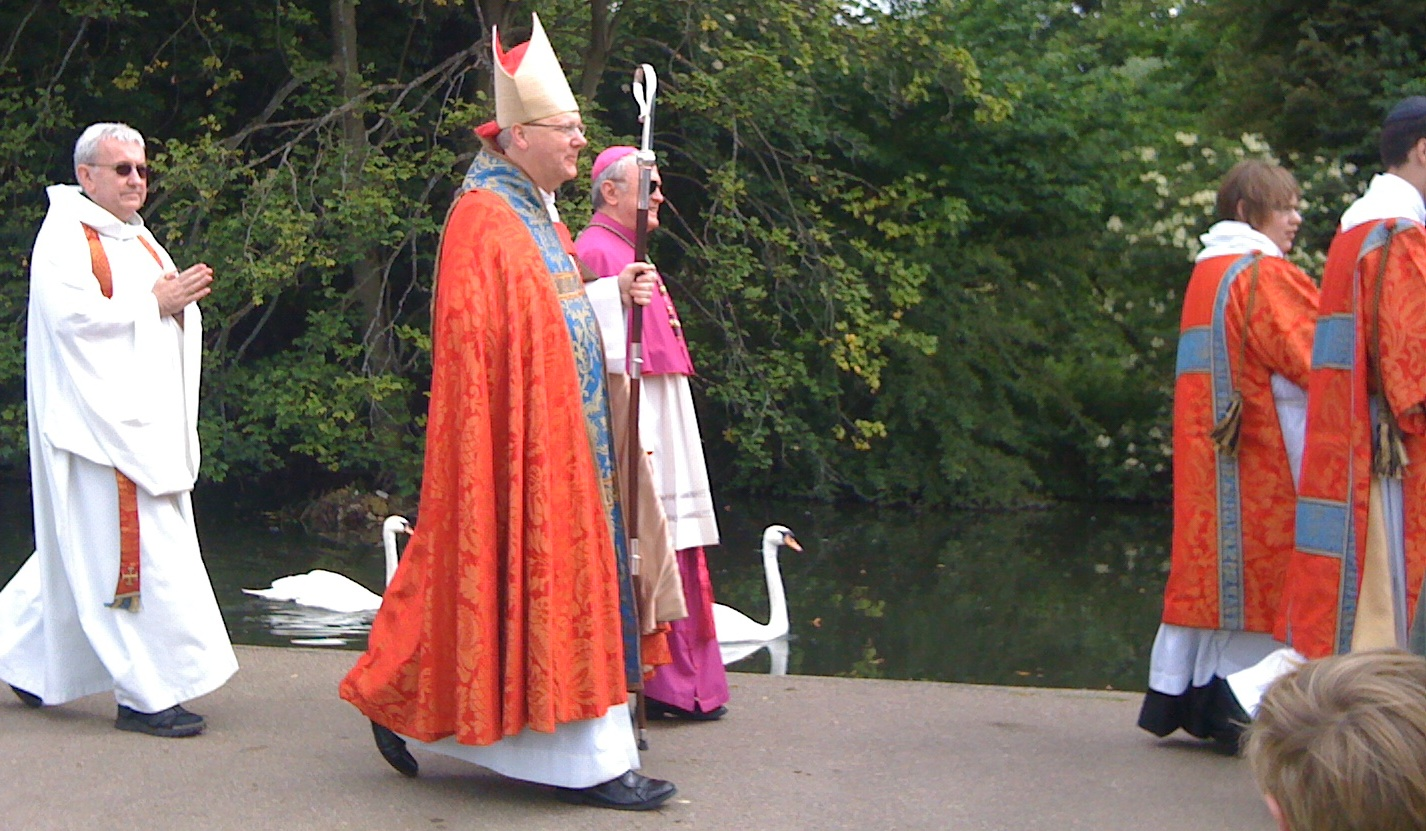
Smith in procession to St Albans cathedral in 2010

- The Reverend Alan Smith (1981–1997)
- The Venerable Alan Smith (1997–2001)
- The Right Reverend Alan Smith (2001–2002)
- The Right Reverend Doctor Alan Smith (2002–present)

Church of England titles
Preceded by David Hallatt	Bishop of Shrewsbury; 2001–2009	Succeeded by Mark Rylands
Preceded by Christopher Herbert	Bishop of St Albans; 2009–2025	TBA
