= Mark Rylands =

British former Anglican bishop (born 1961)

The Right Reverend Mark Rylands
- Bishop of Shrewsbury
- Church: Church of England
- Diocese: Lichfield
- In office: 2009–2018
- Predecessor: Alan Smith
- Successor: Sarah Bullock

Orders
- Ordination: 1987 (deacon); 1988 (priest) by Michael Baughen
- Consecration: 28 October 2009 by Rowan Williams

Personal details
- Born: 11 July 1961 (age 65)
- Denomination: Anglican
- Residence: Athlone House, Shrewsbury
- Parents: Michael Rylands; Denise Bates
- Spouse: Mandy (m. 1986)
- Education: Hild Bede, Durham

Mark James Rylands (born 11 July 1961) is a British Anglican bishop. From 2009 until 2018, he was the area Bishop of Shrewsbury in the Church of England.

== Early life ==
Rylands was born on 11 July 1961, the son of Michael Rylands and Denise née Bates. Michael was sometime Vicar of Wilton, Wiltshire, Rector of Malpas, Cheshire and honorary canon of Chester (Note: Thomas Michael Rylands was made a deacon in 1947, ordained a priest in 1948, and died on 21 October 2003, aged 85.) and Denise a scion of the Bates baronets (of Bellefield): her grandfather was Edward, 2nd Baronet. He was educated at Shrewsbury School and the College of St Hild and St Bede, Durham University, the latter whence he graduated with a Bachelor of Arts (BA) degree in 1983. He trained for the ministry at Trinity College, Bristol, gaining a second BA in 1987; and later studied for a Master of Arts degree from Sheffield University, which he was awarded in 2006.

== Ordained ministry ==
He was made a deacon at Petertide 1987 (27 June) and ordained a priest the Petertide following (3 July 1988) — both times by Michael Baughen, Bishop of Chester, at Chester Cathedral; he began his ordained ministry with a title post as assistant curate at St George's Heaviley, Stockport (1987–1991); he was then vicar of Acton and Worleston, Church Minshull and Wettenhall, Cheshire (1991–1997). He moved to Somerset in 1997 to be team tector for the Langport team ministry (Aller, Drayton, High Ham with Low Ham, Huish Episcopi, Long Sutton, Muchelney and Pitney); then from 2002 until his appointment to the episcopate he was diocesan missioner for the Diocese of Exeter and a canon residentiary at Exeter Cathedral.

=== Episcopate ===
Rylands was appointed Bishop of Shrewsbury, one of three area bishops (suffragan bishops with delegated responsibility for episcopal areas) in the Diocese of Lichfield: he was consecrated a bishop at Westminster Abbey on 28 October 2009 by Rowan Williams, Archbishop of Canterbury, and installed at Lichfield Cathedral on 2 November 2009.

In March 2018 it was announced that Rylands would resign as Bishop of Shrewsbury and return to parish ministry. Since July 2018, he has led the Ashburton and Moorland team ministry in the Diocese of Exeter, first as priest-in-charge and then as rector since 2021. He has additionally been an honorary assistant bishop in the Diocese of Exeter since 2018.

== Personal life ==
Mark married in 1986 and they have two adult children; his wife is also a priest. (Note: She was licensed a deaconess in 1985, made a deacon in 1987 and ordained a priest in 1994.)

== Styles ==
- The Reverend Mark Rylands (1988–2002)
- The Reverend Canon Mark Rylands (2002–2009)
- The Right Reverend Mark Rylands (2009–present)

== Notes ==
Church of England titles
Preceded by Alan Smith	Bishop of Shrewsbury; 2009–2018	Succeeded by Sarah Bullock
