= Percy Ashford =

British Chaplain-General of Prisons (1927–1998)

The Ven. Percival Leonard Ashford (5 June 1927 – 11 October 1998) was Chaplain-General of Prisons from 1981 to 1985.

Ashford was educated at Kemp Welch School and Bristol University and ordained in 1955. After a curacy at St Philip and St James's church, Ilfracombe, he was Curate-in-Charge at the Church of the Good Shepherd, Aylesbury. He was Vicar of St Olaf's, Poughill, Cornwall, before his work with the Prison Service. He worked at Wormwood Scrubs, Risley Remand Centre, Durham, Wandsworth and Winchester. He was an Honorary Chaplain to the Queen from 1982 to 1997. His last post was as Vicar of Hambledon, Hampshire.

Church of England titles
Preceded by Leslie Lloyd Rees	Chaplain-General of Prisons; 1981–1985	Succeeded by Keith Salisbury Pound
