= William Parker (bishop) =

William Alonzo Parker (31 January 1897 – 28 April 1982) was a former Anglican Bishop of Shrewsbury.

== Family, education and war ==
He was son of W. H. Parker of Alkrington, Lancashire; he was educated at Manchester University. During the First World War he served in the Royal Tank Corps, which he joined in 1916, and was Mentioned in Despatches. He left the army in 1924 and completed his university studies, graduating as Bachelor of Commerce in 1926 and Master of Arts (MA) in 1939.

== Ministry ==
Parker was made a deacon in Advent 1928 (23 December) and ordained a priest the following Advent (22 December 1929) – both times by Leonard Burrows, Bishop of Sheffield at Sheffield Cathedral (Parker's title/curacy). He was a curate at Sheffield Cathedral 1928–1930 and then Bishop's Chaplain at St. George's Cathedral, Jerusalem 1931–1937. He was then successively vicar of St Matthew, Gosport, 1937–1942. At the beginning of the Second World War he was a Senior Chaplain of the Forces (1939–40).

He was vicar of St Chad, Shrewsbury 1942–1946 before being appointed Archdeacon of Stafford in 1945, a post he held until his appointment to the episcopate 14 years later. He was also chaplain of the Order of St John from 1955 to 1960, and later sub-prelate of the order, provost of Denstone College 1960–1967. He was consecrated a bishop on 30 November 1959, by Geoffrey Fisher, Archbishop of Canterbury, at Westminster Abbey. He retired as bishop in 1969.

== Marriage and later life ==
In 1930 he married Ellen, daughter of Robert Hodgson (a priest) of Hooton Roberts, Yorkshire.

In retirement he lived at Church Stretton, Shropshire. He died at the Royal Shrewsbury Hospital in 1982, aged 95.

Church of England titles
Preceded by Robert Hodson	Bishop of Shrewsbury; 1959–1969	Succeeded by Francis Cocks
