= David Fleming (priest) =

The Venerable David Fleming (born 8 June 1937) is an Anglican priest: he was Archdeacon of Wisbech from 1984 to 1993; Chaplain-General of Prisons from 1994 to 2001 (and Archdeacon for Prisons); and an Honorary Chaplain to the Queen from 1995 to 2007.

The Venerable Fleming was educated at King Edward VII School, King's Lynn and Kelham Theological College. After National Service with the Royal Norfolk Regiment he was ordained in 1963. After curacies in Liverpool and Sandringham he was Vicar of Great Staughton and Chaplain of HM Borstal, Gaynes Hall from 1968 to 1976 (and Rural Dean of St Neots from 1972 to 1976. He was Vicar of Whittlesey and Rural Dean of March from 1977 to 1982. He was Priest in charge of Pondersbridge from 1983 to 1985 and Vicar of Wisbech from 1985 to 1988. He was an Honorary Canon of Ely Cathedral from 1982 to 2001. He was succeeded as Chaplain General by the Venerable Noblett.

== Notes ==
Church of England titles
| Preceded by William James Patterson | Archdeacon of Huntingdon and Wisbech; 1984–1993 | Succeeded by Jim Rone |
| Preceded by Keith Salisbury Pound | Chaplain-General of Prisons; 1994–2001 | Succeeded by William Noblett |
