= David Hallatt =

The Rt Revd David Hallatt MA(Oxon) FRGS
- Bishop of Shrewsbury
- Diocese: Diocese of Lichfield
- In office: 1994–2001 (retired)
- Predecessor: John Davies
- Successor: Alan Smith
- Other posts: Honorary assistant bishop in Salisbury (2011–present); and in Sheffield (2001–2010); Archdeacon of Halifax (1989–1994)

Orders
- Ordination: c. 1963 (deacon); c. 1964 (priest)
- Consecration: 1994

Personal details
- Born: 15 July 1937 (age 89)
- Denomination: Anglican
- Parents: John & Edith
- Spouse: Margaret Smitton (m. 1967)
- Children: 2 sons
- Education: University of Southampton

David Marrison Hallatt (born 15 July 1937) is a former Anglican Bishop of Shrewsbury in the diocese of Lichfield.

Hallatt was educated at Birkenhead School and the University of Southampton. Ordained in 1963 he began his career as curate at St Andrew's Maghull. After that he was successively the Vicar of Totley, Team Rector of Didsbury and finally (before his elevation to the episcopate) Archdeacon of Halifax.

== Retirement ==
A keen ornithologist, in retirement he continued to serve the Church as an honorary assistant bishop within Sheffield diocese (2001–2010) and then Salisbury diocese (since 2011).

Church of England titles
Preceded by John Davies	Anglican Bishop of Shrewsbury; 1994–2001	Succeeded by Alan Smith
