= John Davies (bishop of Shrewsbury) =

English Anglican bishop (1927–2026)

- Bishop of Shrewsbury
- Diocese: Diocese of Lichfield
- In office: 1987–1994
- Predecessor: Leslie Rees
- Successor: David Hallatt
- Other posts: Diocesan Missioner, St Asaph (1982–1987); Honorary assistant bishop in St Asaph (2009–20??); and in Lichfield (1995–2005)

Orders
- Ordination: 1953 (deacon); 1954 (priest)
- Consecration: 1987

Personal details
- Born: 12 August 1927
- Died: 23 September 2026 (aged 99) Gobowen, Shropshire, England
- Denomination: Anglican
- Parents: Charles & Minnie
- Spouse: Shirley Gough (m. 1956)
- Children: 1 son; 2 daughters
- Profession: Bishop, author
- Education: Trinity College, Cambridge

John Dudley Davies (12 August 1927 – 23 September 2026) was an English Anglican clergyman who was the Bishop of Shrewsbury from 1987 to 1994. During his tenure the post changed from suffragan bishop to area bishop with the institution of area bishops in 1992.

After service in the Royal Air Force from 1945 to 1948, Davies was educated at Trinity College, Cambridge (becoming a Cambridge Master of Arts), and at Lincoln Theological College. He was made a deacon and ordained a priest, and began his career as curate in Halton, Leeds. Following that he served for many years in Southern Africa: his posts including that of Missionary Director for Empangeni and Chaplain at the University of Witwatersrand. While he was chaplain at the University, Davies played a major role in drafting the document A Message to the People of South Africa, a pamphlet published by the South African Council of Churches that challenged the Christians in South Africa to examine the policy of Apartheid. In 1970, action by the South African government terminated his ministry in that country.

Returning to Britain in 1970 to an administrative post at the Church of England Board of Education, he then served as Vicar and University Chaplain at Keele; he was subsequently appointed Principal of Ascension College, Selly Oak, and finally (before his appointment to the episcopate) Diocesan Missioner of St Asaph. He was consecrated a bishop on 5 February 1987, by Robert Runcie, Archbishop of Canterbury, at Westminster Abbey. In 2012, while in his retirement he and his wife Shirley led the parish of St Dogfan, Llanrhaeadr-ym-Mochnant in mid-Wales (where he had previously served as Vicar), while they were without a parish priest.

On 11 February 2017, 14 retired bishops signed an open letter to the then-serving bishops of the Church of England. In an unprecedented move, they expressed their opposition to the House of Bishops' report to General Synod on sexuality, which recommended no change to the Church's canons or practices around sexuality. By 13 February, a serving bishop (Alan Wilson, Bishop of Buckingham) and nine further retired bishops — including Davies — had added their signatures; on 15 February, the report was rejected by synod.

Davies died at his home in Gobowen, Shropshire, on 23 September 2026, aged 99.

== Bibliography ==
Davies’ books include:

- Beginning now - a Christian exploration of the first three chapters of Genesis - Fortress Press (Philadelphia) (1971)
- Good news in Galatians - Paul's letter to the Galatians in Today's English version - Collins Fontana Books (Glasgow) (1975)
- Creed and Conflict - Lutterworth Pr – ISBN 978-0-7188-2414-3 (1979)
- The Faith Abroad - Blackwell (Oxford) (1983)
- The Crisis of the Cross - the Challenge at the heart of the Christian Story - Canterbury Press (Norwich) (1997)
- Be Born in us today - The Message of the Incarnation - Canterbury Press (Norwich) (1999)
- God at Work - Creation Then and Now - Canterbury Press (Norwich) (2000)
- Only Say the Word - Interactive studies on healing and salvation - Canterbury Press (Norwich) (2002)
- A Song for every morning - Dedication and Defiance with St Patrick's Breastplate - Canterbury Press (Norwich) (2008)
- Three Mountains to Freedom - Practice Interpretation of Paul's Letter to the Galatians (Deo Publishing Blandford Forum) ( 2015)

Church of England titles
Preceded by Leslie Rees	Bishop of Shrewsbury; 1987–1994	Succeeded by David Hallatt
