= James Ridge (priest) =

Church of England priest (born 1977)

James Scott Ridge is an Anglican priest. A member of the Church of England, he has been a prison chaplain at a number of institutions in the UK. In 2018 he was appointed Chaplain-General of Prisons and Archdeacon of Prisons.

== Early life and education ==
Ridge was born in 1977 and educated at Exeter University, Selwyn College, Cambridge, and Westcott House, Cambridge.

== Ordained ministry ==
Ridge was ordained deacon in 2005 and priest in 2006. After a curacy in Halstead he became a prison chaplain. He was at HM Prison Chelmsford from 2009 to 2016 and HM Prison Wayland from then until his appointment as archdeacon.

Church of England titles
Preceded by Mike Kavanagh	Chaplain-General of Prisons; 2018–present	Incumbent
