= Francis Cocks =

British Anglican bishop

The Right Reverend Francis Cocks CB
- Bishop of Shrewsbury
- Church: Church of England
- Diocese: Diocese of Lichfield
- In office: 1970 to 1980
- Predecessor: William Parker
- Successor: Leslie Lloyd Rees

Orders
- Ordination: 1937
- Consecration: 1970

Personal details
- Born: 5 November 1913
- Died: 20 August 1998 (aged 84)
- Denomination: Anglicanism

Francis William Cocks, CB (5 November 1913 – 20 August 1998) was a British Anglican bishop and military chaplain. He was the Bishop of Shrewsbury from 1970 to 1980.

== Early life and education ==
Cocks was born on 5 November 1913 into an ecclesiastical family – his father was William Cocks sometime Vicar of Felixstowe, rural dean and honorary canon of St Edmundsbury Cathedral. He was educated at Haileybury, a private school in Hertford Heath, Hertfordshire. He studied history at St Catharine's College, Cambridge. He trained for Holy Orders at Westcott House, Cambridge. He was an active rugby player for Cambridge University R.U.F.C., playing in The Varsity Match in 1935, Hampshire county, the Eastern Counties and Wasps.

== Ordained ministry ==
Made a deacon on Trinity Sunday 1937 (23 May) and ordained a priest that year's Advent (18 December 1937) — both times by Cyril Garbett, Bishop of Winchester, at Winchester Cathedral. He served his title as curate of Highfield Church; in the Second World War, he was a Chaplain in the RAFVR until 1945, and then the Service itself, eventually rising to the rank of Chaplain in chief from 1959 to 1965 (he was also Archdeacon of the RAF), and for the same latter period he was Canon Emeritus at Lincoln Cathedral. He was awarded the Companion of the Bath (CB) in 1959.

From 1965 until 1970 he was Rector of Wolverhampton when he was appointed to the episcopate, a post he held for a decade. He was consecrated a bishop on 24 February 1970, by Michael Ramsey, Archbishop of Canterbury, at Westminster Abbey.

== Later life ==
He retired to live at Felixstowe where he died on 19 August 1998, aged 84.

Military offices
Preceded by Alan Giles	Chaplain-in-Chief of the RAF; 1949–1953	Succeeded by Wilfred Payton
Church of England titles
New title	Archdeacon for the Royal Air Force; 1949–1953	Succeeded by Wilfred Payton
Preceded by William Parker	Bishop of Shrewsbury; 1970–1980	Succeeded by Leslie Lloyd Rees
