= Eric Hamilton (bishop) =

British bishop (1890–1962)

The Right Reverend Eric Hamilton KCVO
- Dean of Windsor
- Diocese: Royal peculiar
- In office: 1944 – 1962
- Predecessor: Albert Baillie
- Successor: Robin Woods
- Other post: Bishop of Shrewsbury (1940–1944)

Orders
- Ordination: 1913 (deacon); 1914 (priest) by Arthur Winnington-Ingram
- Consecration: 1940 by Cosmo Lang

Personal details
- Born: Eric Knightley Chetwode Hamilton; 1890
- Died: 21 May 1962
- Denomination: Anglicanism
- Education: University College, Oxford

Eric Knightley Chetwode Hamilton KCVO (1890 – 21 May 1962) was an Anglican bishop. He served as Bishop of Shrewsbury, a suffragan bishop of the Diocese of Lichfield (1940 to 1944), and was then Dean of Windsor from 1944 until his death.

== Biography ==
He was born in 1890 and educated at Bradfield School and University College, Oxford. He was the youngest of the four adult sons of Charles Hamilton, sometime rector of Broome, Worcestershire.

Hamilton was ordained both times alongside his brother, Crewe (later a canon of St Albans): they were made deacons on the Feast of St Thomas (21 December) 1913 and ordained priests on 20 December 1914; both times by Arthur Winnington-Ingram, Bishop of London, at St Paul's Cathedral. He was later priest in charge of St John's, Knightsbridge, vicar of St Nicholas Church, Chiswick and then of St Paul's, Knightsbridge before being appointed Bishop suffragan of Shrewsbury in 1940. He was consecrated a bishop on the feast of the Conversion of Paul (25 January) 1940, by Cosmo Lang, Archbishop of Canterbury, at Westminster Abbey. Four years later he was appointed Dean of Windsor.

A man committed to the worldwide church who "took the very greatest and most conscientious of pains". He died in office as Dean of Windsor on 21 May 1962.

Church of England titles
Vacant Title last held by Lovelace Stamer	Bishop of Shrewsbury; 1940–1944	Succeeded by Robert Hodson
Preceded by Albert Baillie	Dean of Windsor; 1944–1962	Succeeded by Robin Woods
