= Jim Rone =

British Anglican archdeacon

James Rone (known as Jim Rone) (28 August 1935 – 26 January 2014) was Archdeacon of Wisbech from 1995 to 2002.

Rone was educated at Skerry's College, Liverpool. After National Service with the RAMC he was an accountant until 1979 when he began studying for ordination at St Stephen's House, Oxford. He was ordained deacon in 1980 and priest in 1981. After a curacy in Stony Stratford (1980–82), he was Vicar of SS Peter and Mary Magdalene, Fordham and Rector of Kennett (1982–89). He was a Canon Residentiary at Ely Cathedral from 1989 until his appointment as Archdeacon.

He was married to Mary. He died in 2014, aged 78.

== Notes ==
Church of England titles
Preceded by David Fleming	Archdeacon of Huntingdon and Wisbech; 1995–2002	Succeeded by John Stuart Beer
