= Albert Baillie =

British clergyman

Albert Victor Baillie photographed by Walter Stoneman in 1932

Albert Victor Baillie KCVO, DD (5 August 1864 – 3 November 1955) was a Church of England clergyman during the first half of the 20th century, ending his career as Dean of Windsor. He was the Registrar of the Order of the Garter (1917–1939).

Born on 5 August 1864 at Karlsruhe in Baden-Württemberg, the third son of Evan Peter Montague Baillie (1824–1874) and his wife, Lady Frances Anna (née Bruce, d. 1894), daughter of Thomas Bruce, 7th Earl of Elgin. With his aristocrat background, Baillie could claim two popes among his ancestors (one had been a widower before entering the priesthood). In addition, he was a godchild of Queen Victoria. He was educated at Wixenford, Marlborough and Trinity College, Cambridge (matriculated 1883; BA, 1886; honorary DD, 1918). Baillie was ordained in 1888 and he began his ecclesiastical career with Curacies in the slums of Tyne Dock at South Shields, his second and third at Walworth and Plumstead — both at that time in the 1890s being rough and very poor districts of south-east London. Following this he was Chaplain to Randall Davidson, Bishop of Rochester, then Rural Dean of Rugby and Vicar of St Michael, Coventry before a 27-year stint as Dean of Windsor. His family connections brought him invitations to preach before Queen Victoria, with whom he was always on good terms, being rumoured to have been her favourite godson.

Baillie was married on 9 August 1898 to Hon. Constance Elizabeth Hamilton-Russell (died 1924), the third daughter of Gustavus Russell Hamilton-Russell, 8th Viscount Boyne (1830–1907). Her death and that of two of their three sons badly affected him. He resigned the deanery in 1945 and retired to Baldock in Hertfordshire where he died on 3 November 1955, survived by his second son, Ean. A statue of the Madonna and Child is displayed in the Church of St Mary the Virgin in Baldock having been donated in his memory, he worshipping there in his later years. The statue, by Sir William Reid Dick, had been presented to Baillie on his retirement from Windsor.

Church of England titles
Preceded by Philip Frank Eliot	Dean of Windsor; 1917–1944	Succeeded by Eric Knightley Chetwode Hamilton
