= Lewis Thomas (bishop) =

Lewis Thomas, the last abbot of Cwmhir Abbey. Under the provisions of the Suffragan Bishops Act 1534, he was consecrated the Bishop of Shrewsbury on 24 June 1537, probably for the diocese of Llandaff. He also held the living at Bloxham. He died in 1561.
