= Sarah Bullock =

British Church of England bishop (born 1964)

The Right Reverend Sarah Bullock
- Bishop of Shrewsbury
- Church: Church of England
- Diocese: Diocese of Lichfield
- In office: 2019 to present
- Predecessor: Mark Rylands
- Other post: Archdeacon of York (2013–2019)

Orders
- Ordination: 1993 (deacon); 1994 (priest)
- Consecration: 3 July 2019 by Justin Welby

Personal details
- Born: 17 March 1964 (age 62)
- Denomination: Anglicanism
- Education: University of Surrey; Durham University

Sarah Ruth Bullock (born 17 March 1964) is a British Church of England bishop. Since 2019, she has served as Bishop of Shrewsbury, an area bishop in the Diocese of Lichfield. She was previously Archdeacon of York from 2013.

== Early life and education ==
Bullock was born on 17 March 1964. She studied English at the University of Surrey, graduating with a Bachelor of Arts (BA) degree in 1986. She then worked as a teacher at Cheadle Hulme School, a private school in Manchester, from 1986 to 1990. During this time, she was also an assistant diocesan youth officer.

In 1990, Bullock matriculated into Cranmer Hall, Durham, to train for ordination. During this time, she also studied theology at Durham University where she was a member of St John's College, graduating with a further BA in 1993. She later completed a postgraduate certificate in theology, also from Durham, in 2012.

== Ordained ministry ==
Bullock was ordained in the Church of England: made a deacon at Petertide 1993 (27 June) by Christopher Mayfield, Bishop of Manchester, at Manchester Cathedral, and ordained priest the Petertide following (25 June 1994) by Colin Scott, Bishop of Hulme, at St Clement's, Urmston.

From 1993 to 1998, she served her curacy at St Paul's Church, Kersal Moor, in the Diocese of Manchester. After this she was vocations advisor for the Diocese of Manchester from 1998 to 2004, during which time she also served a parish in Moss Side. She was the rector of Whalley Range from 2004 to 2013. She was Archdeacon of York from 2013 until her ordination to the episcopate.

She was consecrated a bishop on 3 July 2019 by Justin Welby, Archbishop of Canterbury, at St Paul's Cathedral. A service of welcome was held at Shrewsbury Abbey on 13 July 2019.

=== Views ===
In November 2023, she was one of 44 Church of England bishops who signed an open letter supporting the use of the Prayers of Love and Faith (i.e. blessings for same-sex couples) and called for "Guidance being issued without delay that includes the removal of all restrictions on clergy entering same-sex civil marriages, and on bishops ordaining and licensing such clergy."

== Personal life ==
In 1992, she married Peter Bullock. They have one son.

Church of England titles
Preceded by Richard Seed	Archdeacon of York; 2013–2019	Succeeded by Sam Rushton
Preceded by Mark Rylands	Bishop of Shrewsbury; 2019–present	Incumbent
