= Charles King (English cricketer) =

English cricketer and cleric

Personal information
- Full name: Charles William King
- Born: 1832
- Died: 8 August 1872 (aged 39–40); Northam, Northumberland, England
- Source: Cricinfo, 14 June 2016

Charles William King (1832 – 8 August 1872) was an English cleric, and a cricketer who played one first-class match for Oxford University Cricket Club in 1852.

King matriculated at University College, Oxford, in 1849 but gained a scholarship at Trinity College, Oxford, and studied there until he graduated B.A. in 1853. He became a Church of England priest and was rector of St Mary-le-Bow, Durham, 1859–67. He was principal of the Female Training College (later St Hild's College of Durham University) 1859–64, then Inspector of Schools for Durham and Northumberland. He married in 1855 Mary Anne Sophia Douglas, daughter of the Rev. Henry Douglas (1793–1859). His son was Sir Henry King, a noted solicitor in India and a fellow first-class cricketer.

== See also ==
- List of Oxford University Cricket Club players
