= Mission Direct =

UK-based charity

- Successor: Alan McCormick
- Formation: 2004
- Founder: Nigel Hyde
- Type: Christian charity
- Headquarters: 27 Bury Mead Rd, Hitchin, Hertfordshire SG5 1RT
- Location: Hitchin, England, UK
- Website: missiondirect.org

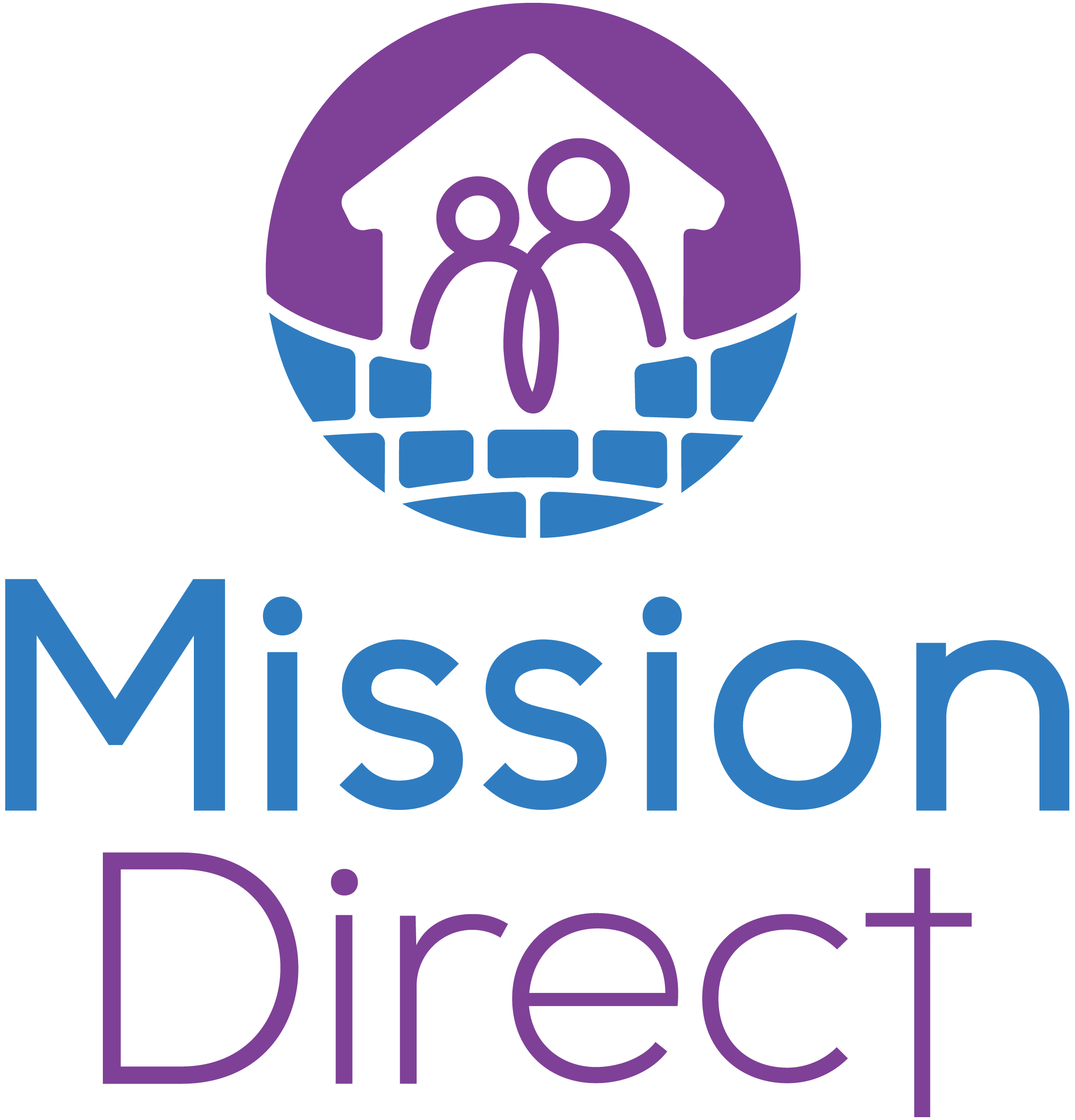
Charity logo

Mission Direct is an international Christian charity based in Hertfordshire, United Kingdom.

The charity enables volunteers to travel and work alongside some of the world's poorest people to build homes, schools, clinics, etc., and works in over 12 countries.

== History ==
Nigel Hyde founded Mission Direct with three of his friends, Lawrence Jones, Tim Martindale and Ronnie Fleming. The four had a clear vision: to enable thousands of people to serve poor people during two-week trips.

In 1997 Hyde was standing outside an ancient church on Mokattam Mountain in Egypt. He said that, "My eyes were transfixed by an old lady rummaging through manure. She wanted something to eat or sell...anything to help her survive. I sensed God calling me to dedicate my life to people like her, trapped by the curse of terrible material poverty. Looking back, this was the catalyst that led to the start of Mission Direct..."

Mission Direct's patron is the Rt. Rev Dr. Alan Smith, Bishop of St Albans. Lord Bill McKenzie of Luton was a previous patron of the charity. The CEO was Alan McCormick, and as of 2021, is now Wilhelm Horwood.

Mission Direct was registered as a charity on 26 January 2005.

== Work ==
Mission Direct first sent teams overseas in 2005 when they built a home for ladies with polio in Sierra Leone. In that first year, they also built homes in the Dominican Republic and a school in the tsunami-hit north of Sri Lanka.

Mission Direct works with locally owned and managed schools, hospitals and organisations, using local tradesmen to build facilities for health, education and housing. They do not own or operate anything in the partner country, which enables them to support sustainable project. Their overseas staff covers their own costs and will host relays of teams to the same communities for several years.

In 2021 teams supported projects in Brazil, Cambodia, Dominican Republic, India, Kenya, Sierra Leone, Uganda, Zambia (Kumi and Rukungiri) and Zimbabwe. The organisation also worked with a UK-based project partnering with Phoenix Community Care Trust, an organization that provides safe housing for children and young asylum seekers arriving in London. Previous teams have also travelled to China, Malawi, Moldova and Guyana. Previous work has included building Vision of Hope in Lusaka, Zambia, providing a safe home for street girls.

Most teams are open to all with the age range so far from 7 to 89. They run projects in the areas of school, medical, teacher training and youth. They also work with schools to help set up IT and science classrooms. The support of corporate teams in the Dominican Republic has enabled Mission Direct to support the ongoing work of local volunteers within their own community. They also run teams for youth from difficult backgrounds.

Mission Direct's work

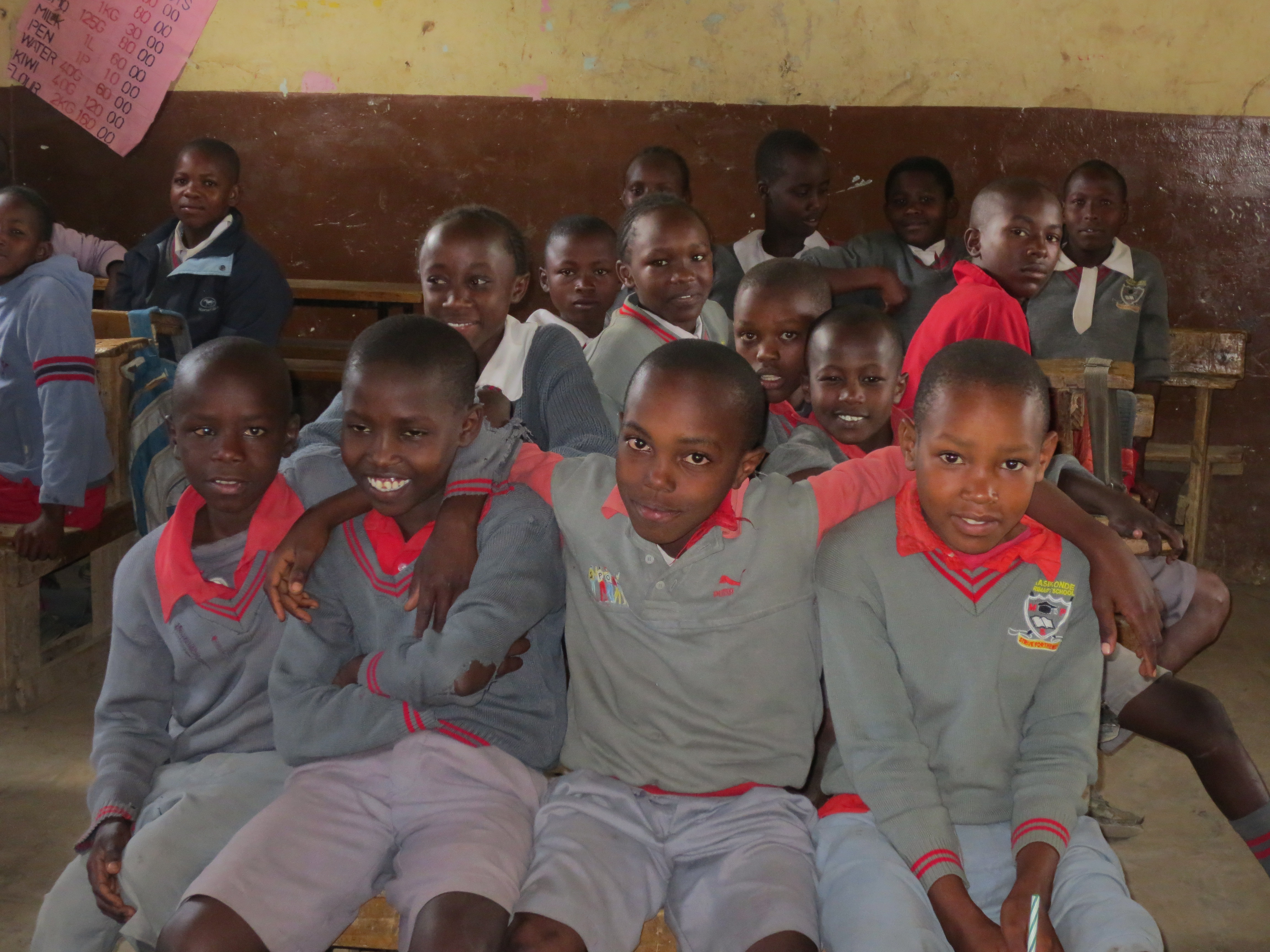
File:Massikonde_School_Classroom.jpgPupils in Massikonde Primary School Kenya ( Teaching mission trip 2016)

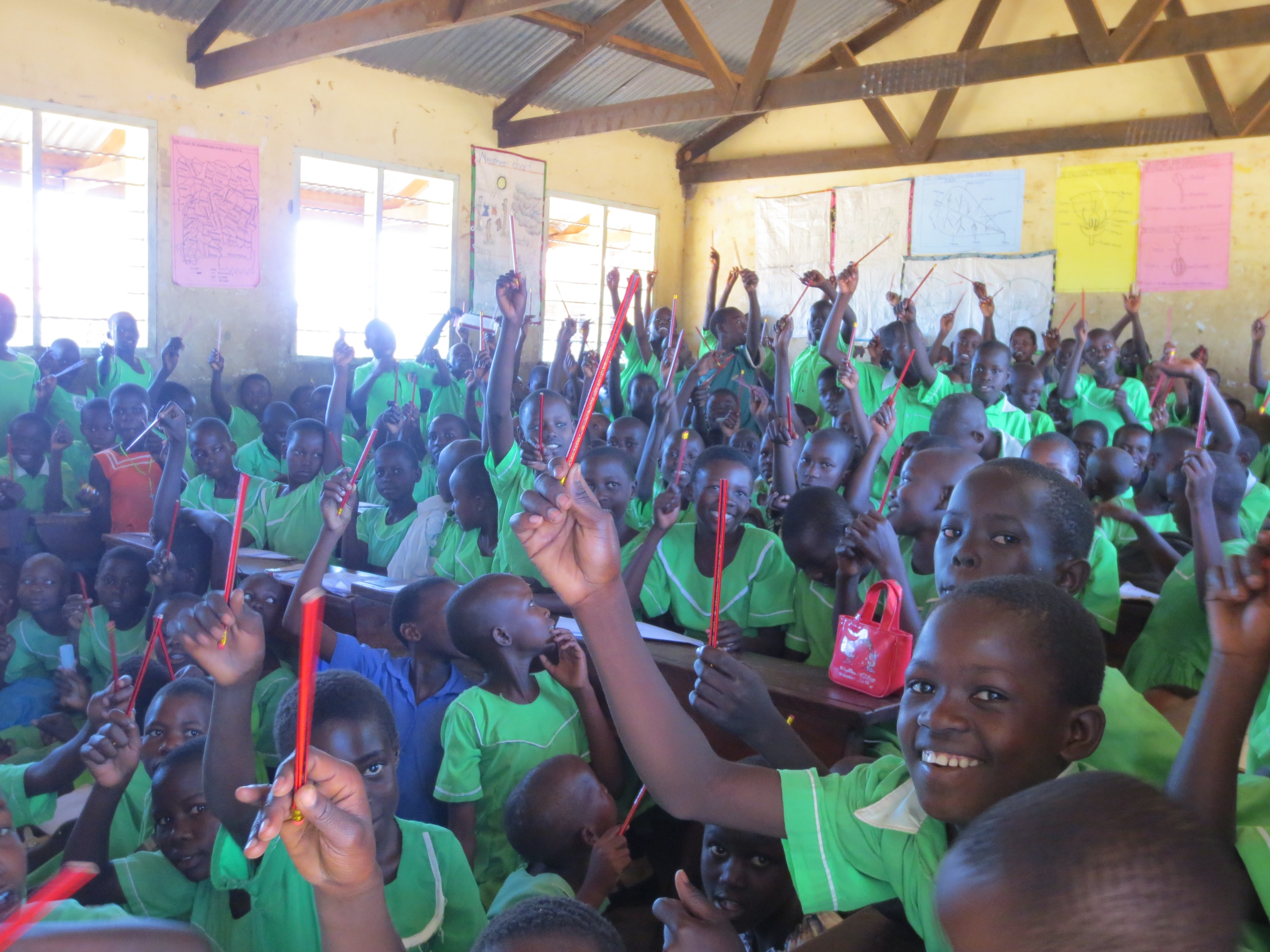
File:Bazaar_School_overcrowded_class.jpgChildren in an overcrowded classroom in Bazaar School, Kumi, Uganda (April 2017)

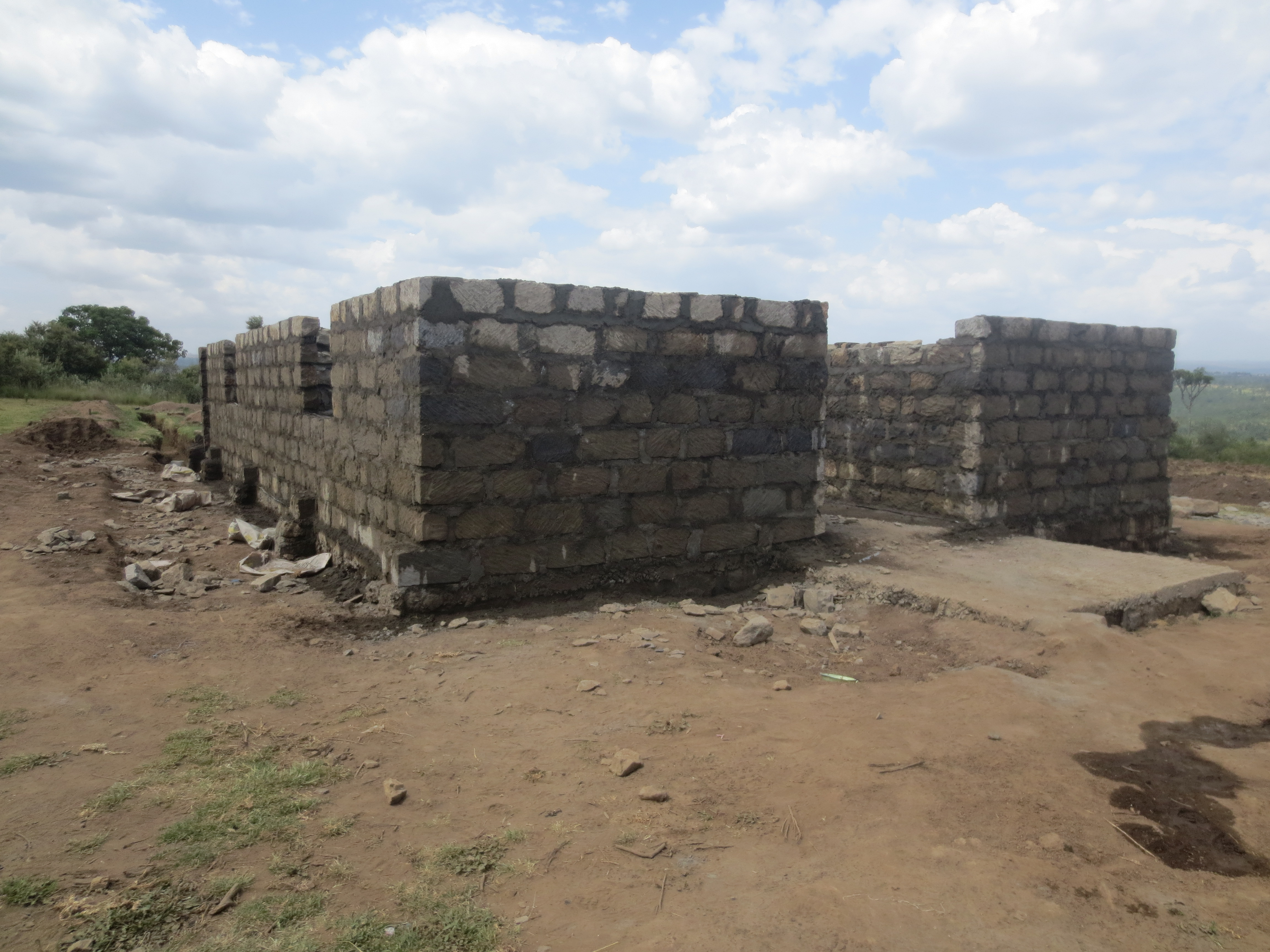
File:Dormitory_for_boys_with_disabilities.jpgAn example of a building project - an accessible dormitory for children with disabilities in rural Kenya (April 2016)

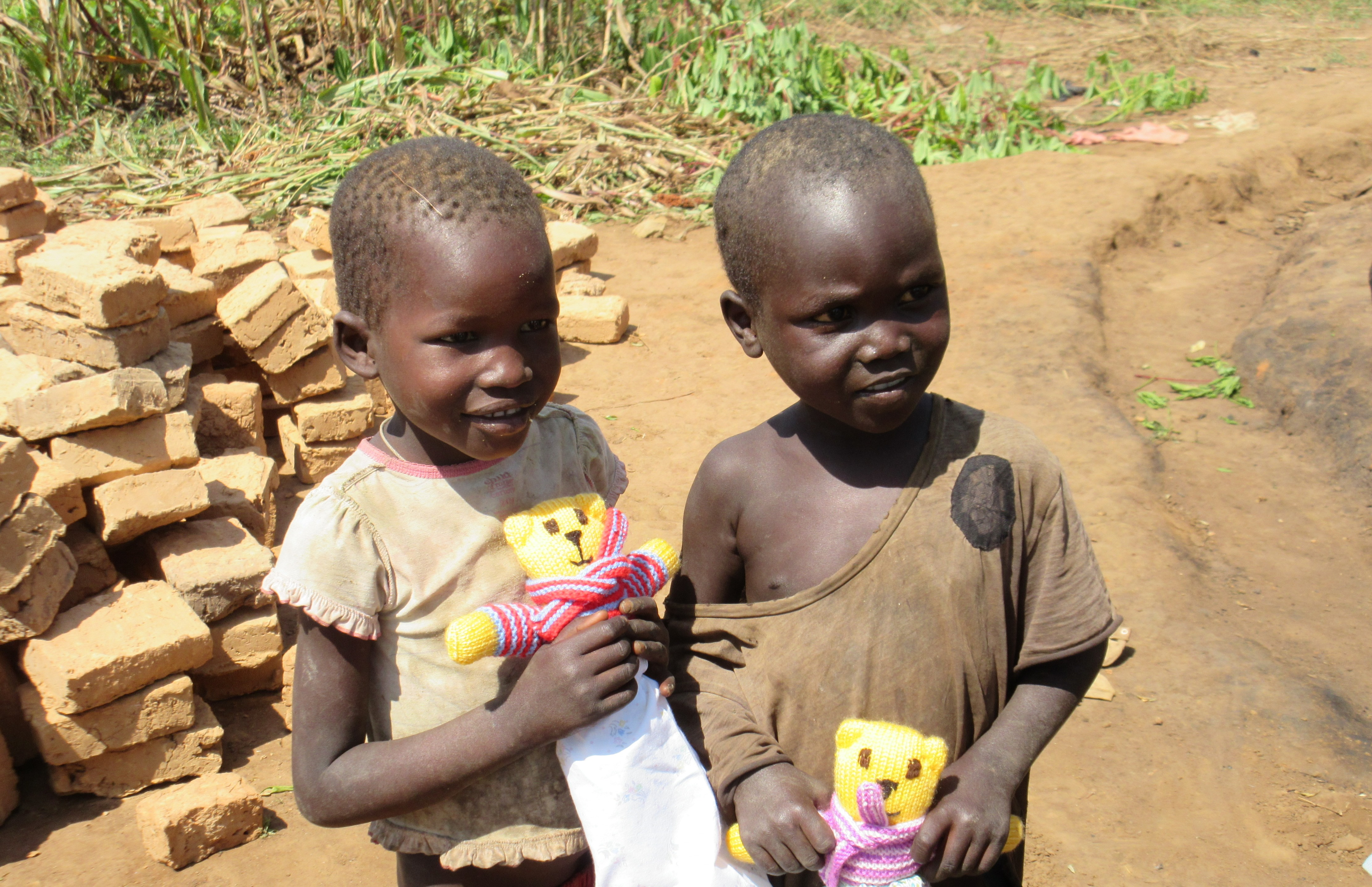
File:Village_children.jpgVolunteers rebuilt this family's home in Kumi, Uganda in July 2015.

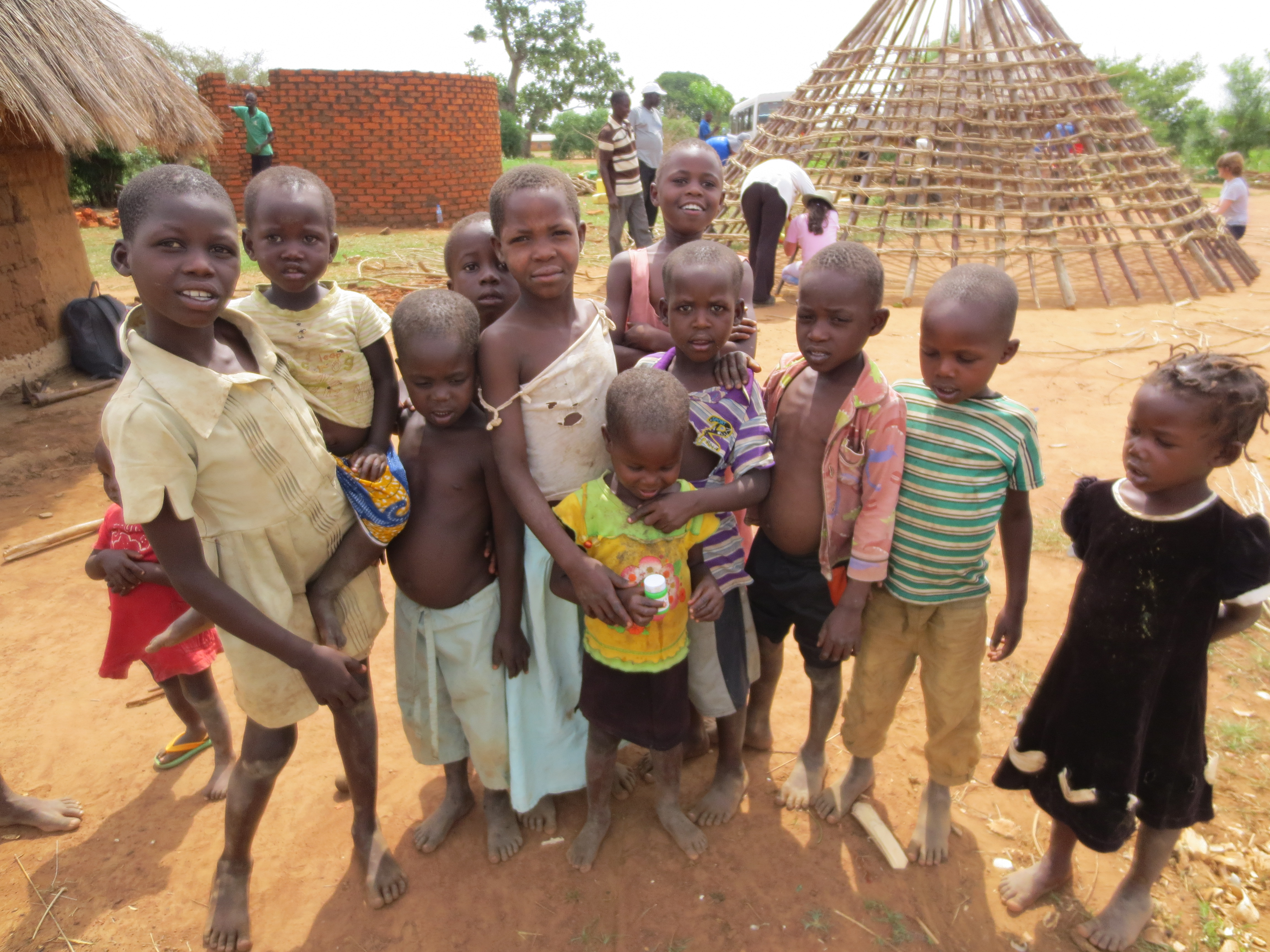
File:Children_living_near_Kumi.jpgHelping to build a village home (April 2017)

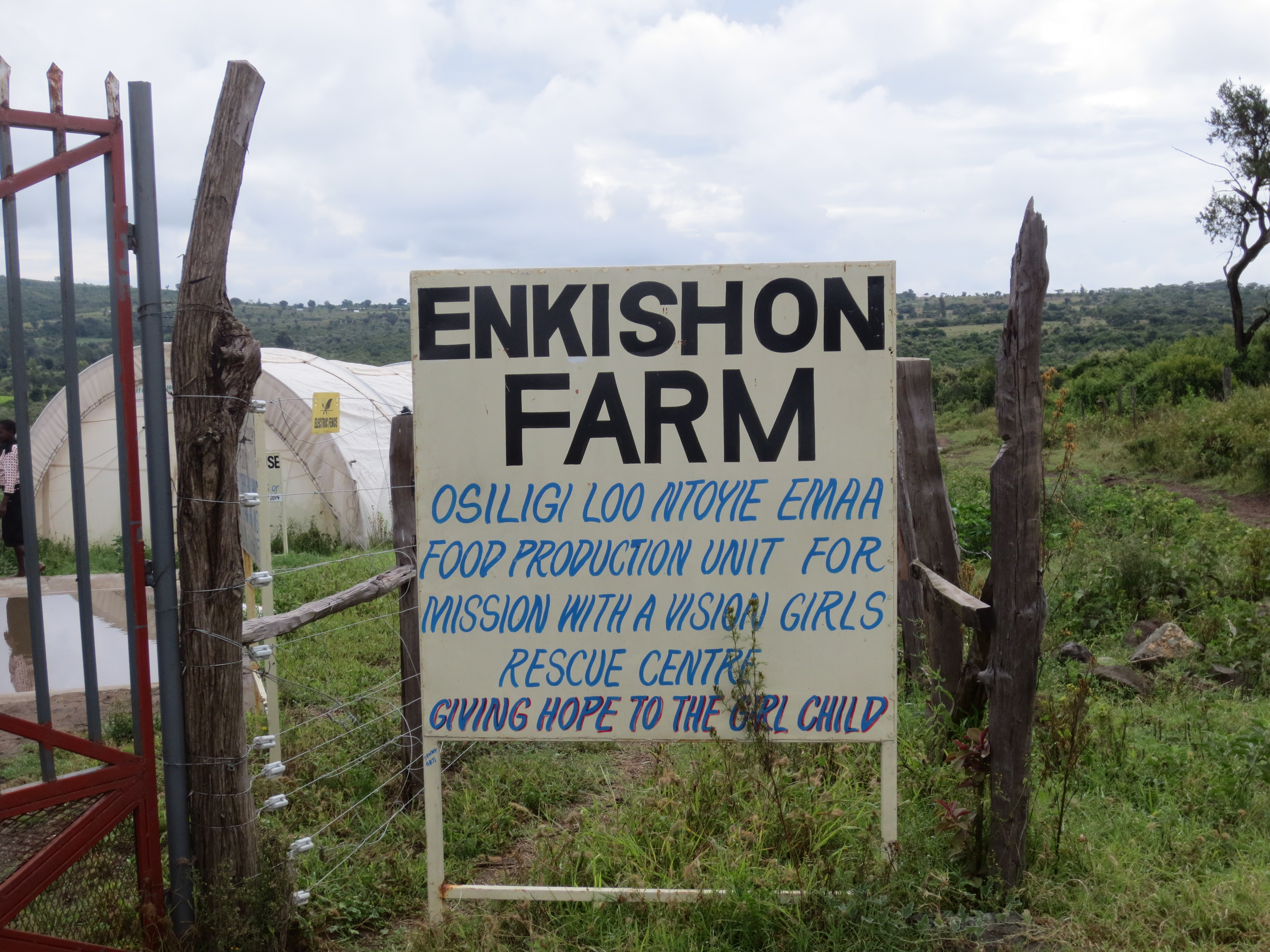
File:Helping_House_of_Hope_become_self_sufficient.jpgHelping House of Hope to develop a viable farm and thus become more self sufficient
