= Mike Kavanagh =

The Venerable Mike Kavanagh
- Chaplain-General of Prisons
- Church: Church of England
- In office: 13 October 2014 to 2018
- Predecessor: William Noblett
- Other post: Archdeacon for Prisons (2014–2018)

Orders
- Ordination: 1987 (deacon); 1988 (priest)

Personal details
- Born: Michael Lowther Kavanagh
- Denomination: Anglicanism
- Education: York University; College of the Resurrection

Michael Lowther Kavanagh is a retired Church of England priest who was the Chaplain-General of Prisons (and Archdeacon of Prisons).

== Early life and education ==
Kavanagh was educated at the University of York and the College of the Resurrection, Mirfield.

== Ordained ministry ==
Kavanagh was ordained deacon in 1987 and priest in 1988. After curacies in Boston Spa and Clifford he was Vicar of Beverley from 1991 to 1997; serving additionally as its Rural Dean from 1995 to 1997. He was Domestic Chaplain to David Hope, Archbishop of York, from 1997 to 2005. He was a prison chaplain at Full Sutton from 2005 to 2008 and Anglican Advisor to the prison service before becoming its head in 2013. Kavanagh was formally licensed as Chaplain-General and Archdeacon for Prisons on 13 October 2014. He retired in 2018.

== Personal life ==
The Venerable Kavanagh married Linda Munt on 13 April 2013. She is also an Anglican priest.

Church of England titles
Preceded by William Noblett	Chaplain-General of Prisons; 2013–2018	Succeeded by James Ridge
