= Chaplain-General of Prisons =

Church of England ecclesiastical office

The Chaplain-General of Prisons is the head of the Church of England's chaplaincy to prisons. He is also an ex officio member of the House of Clergy of the General Synod.

== Chaplains-general ==
Smith was the first chaplain-general.

- 1946-1961 Hugh Smith
- 1962–1980 (res.): Leslie Lloyd Rees
- 1981–1985 (res.): Percy Ashford (first Archdeacon to the Prison Service, 1982–1985)

The post of archdeacon to HM Prisons was created in 1982 and consistently held by the CG.

- 1986–1993 (res.): Keith Pound (also Archdeacon to the Prison Service)
- 1993–2001 (ret.): David Fleming (also Archdeacon of Prisons)
- 2001–2011 (ret.): William 'Nobby' Noblett (also Archdeacon to HM Prisons)
- 2014–2018 (ret.):Mike Kavanagh, Head of Chaplaincy, has been Chaplain-General and Archdeacon since 2013, but was licensed on 13 October 2014.
- October 2018 – present James Ridge
