= Henry King (cricketer) =

English cricketer and solicitor

Personal information
- Full name: Henry Clark King
- Born: 20 June 1857; Durham, County Durham, England
- Died: 23 July 1920 (aged 63); Hove, Sussex, England
- Batting: Right-handed
- Bowling: Right-arm medium
- Relatives: Charles King (father)

Domestic team information
- Years: Team
- 1895: Marylebone Cricket Club

Career statistics
| Competition | First-class |
|---|---|
| Matches | 1 |
| Runs scored | 0 |
| Batting average | 0.00 |
| 100s/50s | –/– |
| Top score | 0 |
| Catches/stumpings | –/– |
- Source: Cricinfo, 9 October 2021

Sir Henry Clark King (20 June 1857 — 23 July 1920) was an English first-class cricketer and solicitor.

The son of The Reverend Charles King, he was born at Durham in June 1857. He was educated at Marlborough College, where he played for the cricket eleven. Upon leaving Marlborough he studied law at Leamington, during which he was commissioned into the 10th Warwickshire Rifle Volunteer Corps as a sub-lieutenant in July 1877 and was promoted to lieutenant in September 1879. He was admitted as a solicitor in 1880 and travelled to British India in 1881, where he gained employment as an assistant with the solicitors firm Tasker and Wilson. He later became a senior partner in the firm of King and Josselyn in Madras.

While in India he played minor cricket matches for the Madras cricket team, and on return visits to England he played minor matches for Durham, though he did not feature for the county in the Minor Counties Championship. On one such visit to England in 1895, King played a first-class match for the Marylebone Cricket Club (MCC) against Yorkshire at Scarborough, where he batted once and was dismissed in the MCC's first innings' without scoring by George Hirst. In India he rose to the position of commissioner for the Madras High Court and was one of the organisers for the visit of the Prince of Wales to Madras in 1906.

For his efforts, King was made a Knights Bachelor by the Prince of Wales in May 1906. King died in England at Hove in July 1920.
