= Bellerby Lowerison =

English socialist and secularist (1863–1935)

Bellerby Lowerison (1863–1935) was an English socialist, secularist, archaeologist, educationist, and teacher. In 1899, Lowerison founded the progressive and co-educational Ruskin School Home in Norfolk, which operated until 1926.

== Life ==
Harry Bellerby Lowerison was born in Great Lumley, County Durham on 13 July 1863, the son of a coalminer. He left his family home as a result of disagreements over religion, and trained as a teacher at St Bede College, Durham. He became active in socialist circles, becoming 'widely recognized as a very hard-working socialist propagandist' and wrote prolifically for The Clarion. He was also, by 1891, joint secretary of the largest London branch of the Fabian Society, which met at Lowerison's home in Homerton. In the same year, he joined the Society's national executive committee. In July 1892, Lowerison married Alice Mabel Dutton, a Post Office clerk.

Between 1894 and 1899, Lowerison was employed as a teacher at Wenlock Road School in Hackney, where he experienced a sense of disgust at both the 'overcrowded and filthy' surroundings and the religious character of the school's curriculum. His attempts to improve the situation of the school's pupils, and encourage more progressive attitudes among his colleagues, led Lowerison to assist in establishing the London School Swimming Association, and to try setting up a London schools rambling club. In November 1899, following a series of letters to The Clarion entitled 'My Ideal School', Lowerison was dismissed from Wenlock Road without a reference. The ideals contained in these letters formed the basis of his own school.

In 1898, Lowerison published In England Now, which Robert Blatchford (writing in The Clarion in 1907) described as being 'as like him [Lowerison] as a book can be like its author'. In 1899, he published Field and Folklore, 'a naturalist's handbook for children'. The book contained a chapter by publisher and folklorist Alfred Nutt, who 'conceived the idea of inserting a chapter on folklore, and so introducing the young wildlife observer to the pleasures of detecting and recording traditions.'

In 1910, he adopted the forename Bellerby (given on his birth certificate). In 1913, he oversaw the excavation of ruins at St. Edmund's Point on the Hunstanton cliffs: part of a 12th century chapel said to stand at the landing place of Edmund the Martyr.

== Ruskin School Home ==
Lowerison's letters to The Clarion in 1899 stated his vision for an ideal school, donations for the establishment of which came from its readers. Lowerison wrote:

We will pitch our house in the country, where skies are blue and grass is green, and the young minds and lives entrusted to us shall bud and develop amongst the sweetest and most gracious surroundings and we will take for our basis John Ruskin's educational ideal.

This ideal included 'Health and the Exercises', 'Habits of Gentleness and Justice,' and finding and developing 'the natural capabilities and talents of each individual child... so that the child may follow, happily and naturally, as far as may be, the calling by which he or she is to live.' Following his dismissal from Wenlock Road School, with funds donated by Clarion readers, Lowerison opened his Ruskin School Home in Hunstanton, Norfolk. In 1902, it moved to nearby Heacham. Lowerison and his wife ran the school together, combining 'their great love for children' with 'forward looking ideas on education.' Lowerison's educational approach was cross-curricular, linking diverse subjects in an effort to excite children's imaginations. He outlined his approach in 1906's From Palaeolith to Motor Car and 1911's Star Lore for Teachers. In Cassell's Magazine, Lowerison described his techniques:

It is far better to take the child straight to Nature. He will detest an algebraic symbol; but take a flower, and how he will delight when he is shown the symbol of its delicate petals... Nothing can be more practical than reading, writing, arithmetic, Euclid, history, geography, French, and German. Only I try to dovetail the subjects one with another as well as I can.

In line with his socialist values, Lowerison 'structured the school so that it was as deinstitutionalized as possible', allowing pupils significant freedom 'to roam the countryside and develop their own interests'. A. S. Neill, the Scottish educator and founder of Summerhill School, visited Ruskin School Home, and was likely influenced by it. Lowerison's friend Robert Blatchford, recalling a visit to the school, wrote:

So there is the impossible Harry, in his impossible school: a success for all to see. Ha! It is only a few weeks since I was there, and heard the children sing. They sang freshly and with elation; they sang all the lot of them as with one voice... O, most unpractical Lowerison, thou has made a school out of nothing, and behold the young lives growing therein like flowers.

Between 1909 and 1910, with fifty pupils, the school was at its busiest. After World War I, however, the school declined, and was closed in 1926.

== Retirement and death ==
Lowerison retired with the closure of Ruskin School Home, moving to Houghton, near Huntingdon. He died there on 6 June 1935. He was survived by his wife, Alice Mabel Lowerison, a son and a daughter.

== Bibliography ==
- In England now. Vagrom essays. Dealing with the fields and woods and waters, and the free peoples thereof (1898)
- Field & folklore; an attempt to help the beginner in the studies of our wild mammals, birds, snails, trees, flowers (1899)
- Sweet-briar sprays: being posies pluckt in a random walk through this still beautiful England of ours (1899)
- The Ruskin school-home: an educational experiment (1900)
- Mother earth : chapters on the months of the year (1902)
- From Paleolith to motor car or, Heacham tales (1906)
- "Star-lore for teachers." Suggestions for the teaching of astronomy by direct observation, experiment and deduction (1911)
