= Edward Marriott =

British psychotherapist and author

- Born: 1966 (age 59–60)
- Education: Durham University
- Writing career
- Genres: Travel writing Popular history

Edward Marriott is a British psychotherapist and organisational psychologist. He is a member of the clinic staff of the Institute of Psychoanalysis.

Marriott attended Durham University (1985–1988).

As an author, he has published four books in total. His first book, The Lost Tribe, was an investigation into the supposedly uncontacted Liawep people of New Guinea. It was shortlisted for the 1996 Thomas Cook Travel Book Award.

== Works ==
- Marriott, Edward (1996). The Lost Tribe: A Harrowing Passage into New Guinea's Heart of Darkness. Holt Paperbacks. ISBN 0805064494.
- ——— (2000). Savage Shore: Life and Death with Nicaragua's Last Shark Hunters. Holt Paperbacks. ISBN 0805055568.
- ——— (2002). The Plague Race. Pan Macmillan. ISBN 0330483196.
- ——— (2005). Claude and Madeleine: A True Story of War, Espionage and Passion. Picador. ISBN 0330419161.
