= Hugh Smith (priest) =

British Chaplain-General of Prisons

Hugh Thomas Smith, OBE, AKC was Chaplain-General of Prisons from 1946 to 1961.

Smith was born in 1896, educated at King's College London and ordained in 1928. After a curacy at St Katherine Coleman, Hammersmith he became a prison chaplain, serving at Leeds, Parkhurst, Wandsworth and Wormwood Scrubs before his years as head of the service.
