= Robert Hodson =

British bishop (1885 – 1960)

- Bishop of Shrewsbury
- Diocese: Diocese of Lichfield
- In office: 1944 – 1959 (ret.)
- Predecessor: Eric Hamilton
- Successor: William Parker
- Other post: Archdeacon of Stafford and Canon of Lichfield (1935–1944)

Orders
- Ordination: 1908 (deacon) by Augustus Legge (Lichfield)
- Consecration: 1944 by Geoffrey Fisher (London)

Personal details
- Born: 30 March 1885
- Died: 8 January 1960 (aged 74)
- Denomination: Anglican
- Education: St Edmund Hall, Oxford

Robert Leighton Hodson (30 March 1885 – 8 January 1960) was the third Bishop of Shrewsbury in the modern era.

Son of John Humphries Hodson and his wife Annie, he was educated at Berkhamsted School and St Edmund Hall, Oxford, graduating as Bachelor of Arts (B.A.) in 1907 and Master of Arts (M.A.) in 1911. He trained for the Church of England ministry at Lichfield Theological College, which he entered in 1907. He was made deacon in Advent 1908 (20 December), by Augustus Legge, Bishop of Lichfield, at Lichfield Cathedral and Priest in 1910 by the Bishop of Lichfield. He was successively Curate at St Peter's Collegiate Church, Wolverhampton, 1908 to 1912, and of Stavanton with Boddington, Gloucestershire, 1912 to 1917, Vicar of St Stephen's, Cheltenham, 1917 to 1925, Vicar of St Giles, Willenhall, Staffordshire, 1925 to 1928, Rector of St Peter's and Rural Dean of Wolverhampton from 1929 to 1935 and finally (before his elevation to the episcopate in 1944) Archdeacon of Stafford from 1935. Later in World War I he was a Temporary Chaplain of the Forces over 1918–19. He held several positions at Lichfield Cathedral as Treasurer (1935–36), Canon (1935–44) and Precentor (1936–44); and served as a Proctor in Convocation (1932–35).

He was consecrated bishop at Michaelmas (29 September) 1944, by Geoffrey Fisher, Bishop of London, at St Paul's Cathedral; to serve as Bishop suffragan of Shrewsbury. During his episcopate he concurrently served as Provost of Denstone College from 1949.

Hodson married in 1913 Margery Gertrude Corker; the couple had one son and two daughters. His elder brother was Austin, Bishop suffragan of Tewkesbury.

He retired in October 1959 and moved to Llanfairfechan in north Wales, but died less than three months later, aged 74.

Church of England titles
Preceded by Eric Hamilton	Bishop of Shrewsbury; 1944 – 1959	Succeeded by William Parker
