= Anglican Bishop of Shrewsbury =

Suffragan (area) bishop in the Church of England

The Anglican Bishop of Shrewsbury is an episcopal title used by a suffragan bishop of the Church of England Diocese of Lichfield, in the Province of Canterbury, England. The title takes its name after the town of Shrewsbury in Shropshire and was first created under the Suffragan Bishops Act 1534. The Bishop of Shrewsbury has particular episcopal oversight of the parishes in the Archdeaconry of Salop. The bishops suffragan of Shrewsbury have been area bishops since the Lichfield area scheme was instituted in 1992.

The current bishop is Sarah Bullock, since her consecration on 3 July 2019.

== List of bishops ==
Anglican Bishops of Shrewsbury
From	Until	Incumbent	Notes
1537	1561	Lewis Thomas	Not appointed for diocese of Lichfield, but probably for the diocese of Llandaff.
1561	1888	in abeyance	
1888	1905	Sir Lovelace Stamer, Bt	
1905	1940	in abeyance	
1940	1944	Eric Hamilton	
1944	1959	Robert Hodson	
1959	1970	William Parker	
1970	1980	Francis Cocks	
1980	1987	Leslie Lloyd Rees	
1987	1994	John Davies	First area bishop from 1992.
1994	2001	David Hallatt	
2001	2009	Alan Smith	Translated to St Albans
2009	2018	Mark Rylands	Retired July 2018.
2019	present	Sarah Bullock	Consecrated 3 July 2019.
