= Chavasse =

Chavasse is a surname. Notable people with the surname include:

- Chavasse family in the West Midlands, an originally Catholic British family originating in southeast France in the 17th century
  - Christopher Maude Chavasse OBE MC, Bishop of Rochester and Olympic athlete, son of Bishop Francis James Chavasse
  - Francis Bernard Chavasse MC ophthalmologist of Rodney St. Liverpool and Harley St. London; edited Worth's Squint
  - Francis James Chavasse, Bishop of Liverpool and founder of St Peter's College, Oxford
  - Kendal Chavasse, DSO and bar (1904 - 2001), Irish-born officer in the British Army, served in World War II
  - Noel Godfrey Chavasse VC & Bar MC, First World War medic and twice winner of the Victoria Cross, son of Bishop Francis James Chavasse
