= Chavasse Park =

Park in Liverpool, United Kingdom

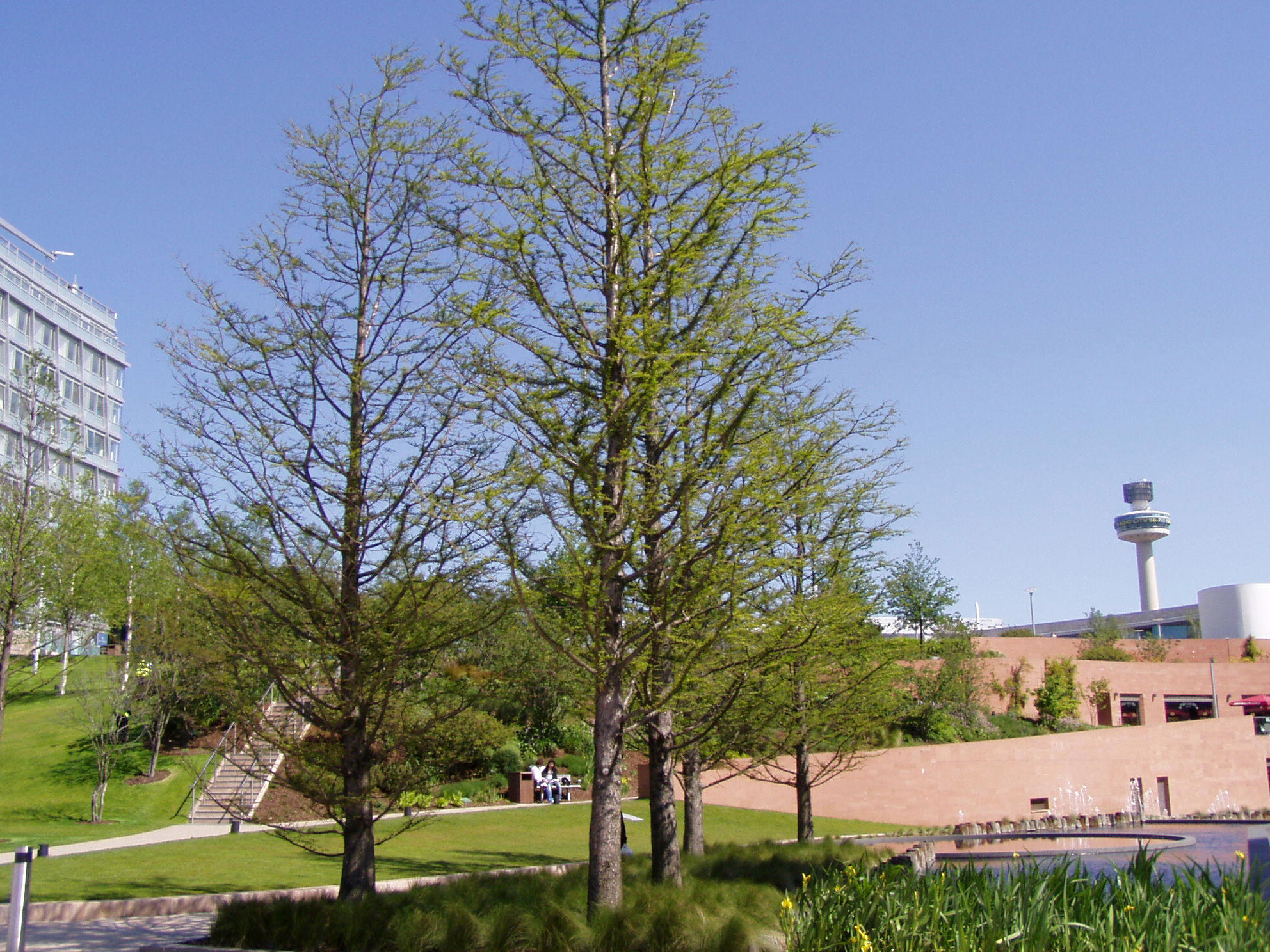
- The park shortly after its construction in 2009 with the Radio City Tower in the background
- Interactive map of Chavasse Park
- Location: Liverpool One, City Centre, Liverpool
- Coordinates: 53.403364°N 2.988165°W
- Area: 5.5 acres (22,000 m^{2})
- Created: 2008
- Operator: Liverpool City Council
- Status: Open

Chavasse Park is an open space in the city centre of Liverpool, England, United Kingdom. It was named in commemoration of the Chavasse family; Francis (2nd Bishop of Liverpool) and his twin sons Christopher Maude Chavasse (an Olympic athlete and later Bishop of Rochester), and Noel Godfrey Chavasse (an Olympic athlete, doctor, and one of only three men to win the Victoria Cross and Bar).

The park was designated in the 1980s and originally consisted of a 2–3-acre plot of unfenced grass verges, framed by city centre buildings; the Queen Elizabeth II law courts lay to the north, and Canning Place fire station & Steers House to the south. The west side of the park was bounded by the Dock Road, while beyond that were the historic Salthouse, and Albert Docks.

The park itself was extensively altered as part of the Paradise Project redevelopment scheme. The park was excavated in Spring 2004 prior to the commencement of the Paradise Project (now known as Liverpool One). The park was reinstated atop a new 2000-space underground car park, rising in terraces to connect to the newly constructed pavilions above South John Street. It re-opened in Autumn 2008.

For many years the park was the home of the Yellow Submarine sculpture, created for the International Garden Festival in 1984, subsequently sited in Chavasse Park, and relocated in 2005 to Liverpool John Lennon Airport. The park was also home to the John Lennon Peace Monument, entitled Peace and Harmony, unveiled in 2010 to mark the 70th anniversary of John Lennon's birth. The eighteen-foot high monument is now located outside the Liverpool Arena.

The park is framed by the residential development One Park West to the west, Liverpool One to the north, the Hilton Liverpool to the east and the Albert Dock to the south.
