= Birmingham General Hospital =

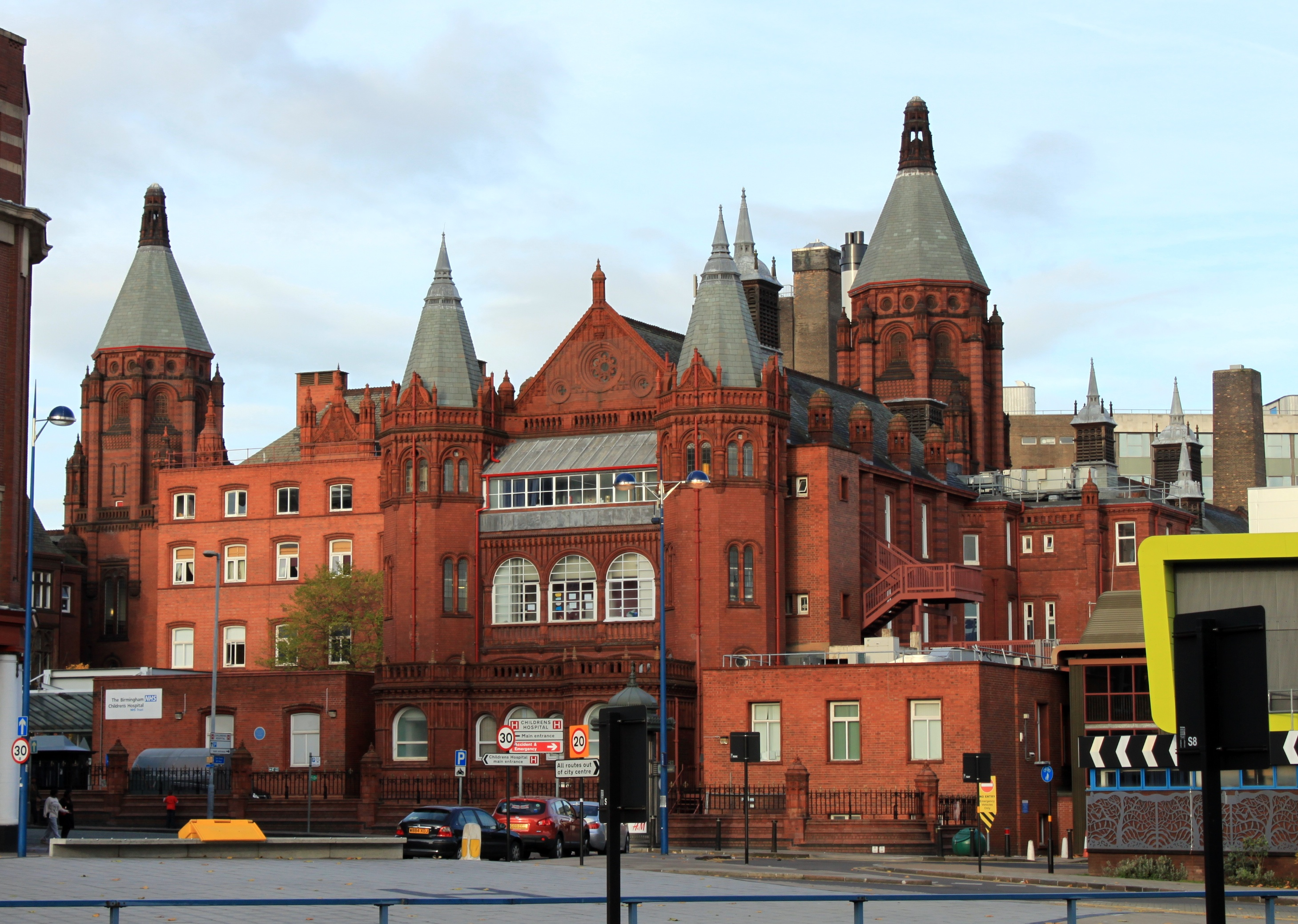
- The Steelhouse Lane building in November 2010

- Shown in West Midlands

Geography
- Location: Birmingham, England
- Coordinates: 52°29′5.1″N 1°53′38″W

Organisation
- Care system: NHS
- Type: Teaching

Services
- Emergency department: Yes

Helipads
- Helipad: Yes

History
- Founded: 1779
- Closed: c. 1995

Links
- Lists: Hospitals in England

Birmingham General Hospital was a teaching hospital in Birmingham, England, founded in 1779 and closed in the mid-1990s.

== History ==
=== Summer Lane ===
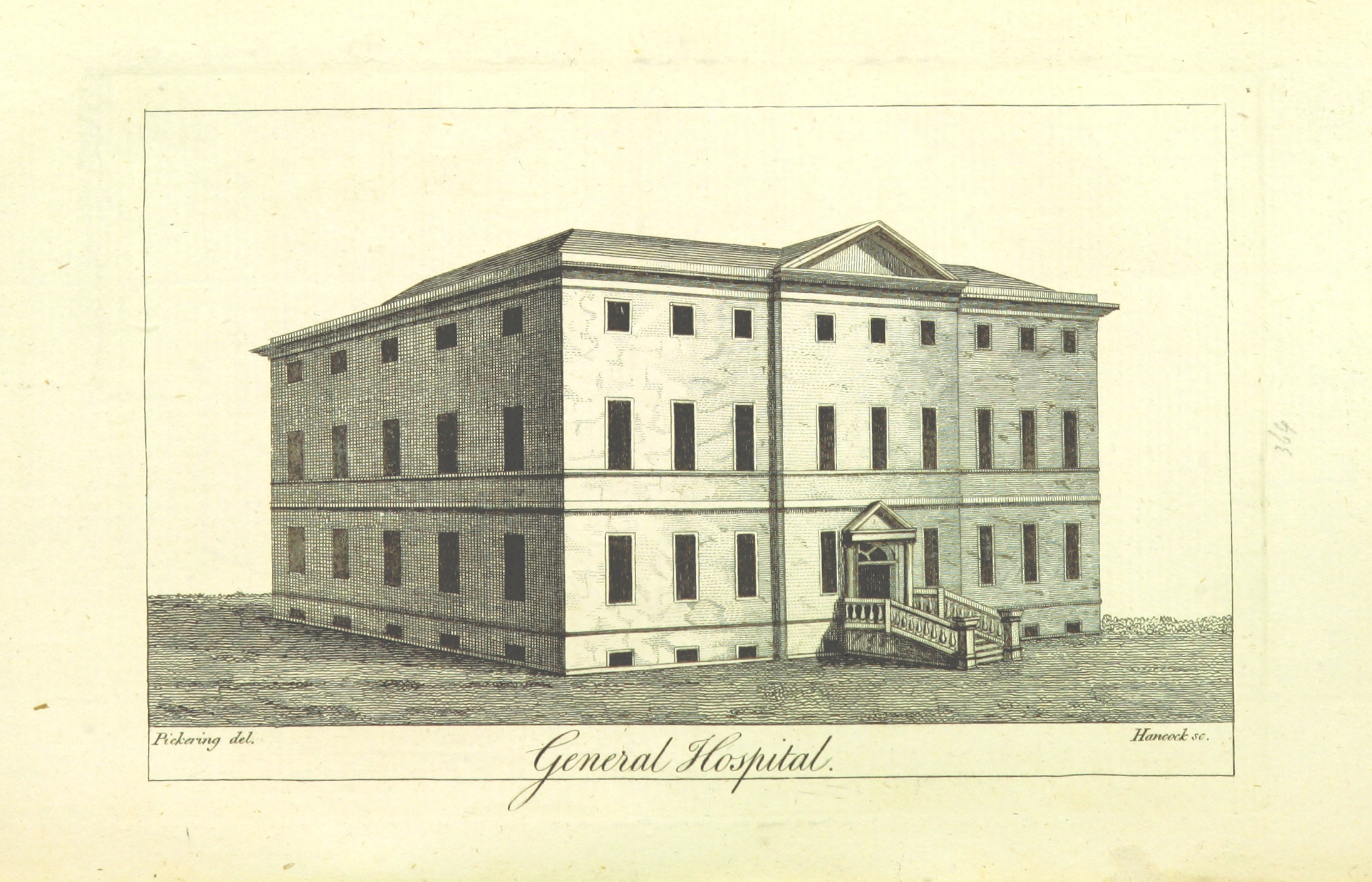
Drawing from William Hutton's 1809 book An history of Birmingham, showing the original building

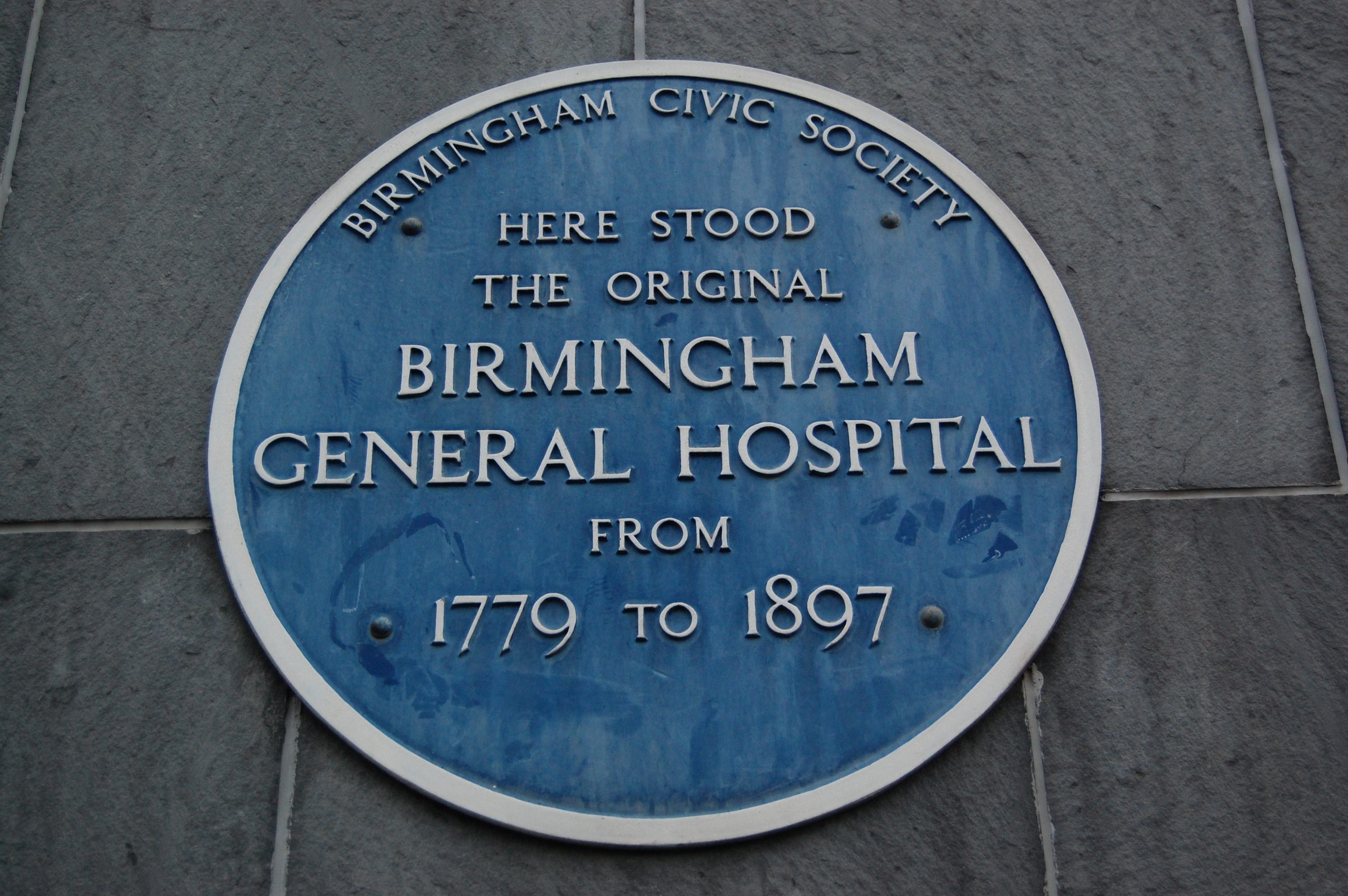
A blue plaque on Centro House

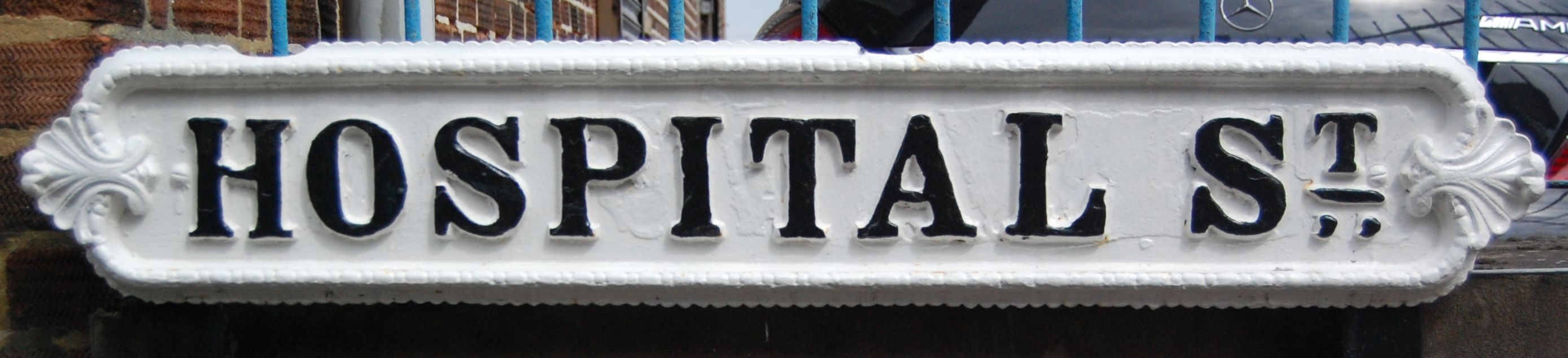
Victorian-era cast iron name plate on Hospital Street

In 1765, a committee for a proposed hospital, formed by John Ash and supported by Sir Lister Holte, 5th Baronet, the Earl of Bradford, Samuel Garbett, Sir Henry Gough, Charles Adderley, Matthew Boulton, John Baskerville, Sampson Lloyd and others, purchased:

all those four closes, pieces, or parcels of Land, Meadow, or Pasture Ground, situate, lying, and being together near a place called the Salutation, in Birmingham aforesaid, containing, by estimation, eight Acres or thereabouts, be the same more or less, adjoining at the upper end or part thereof into a Lane there called Summer Lane, and at the lower end or part thereof unto a way called Walmore Lane

from a Mrs Dolphin, for £120 per acre. (Walmore Lane is now Lancaster Street.) However, work to erect the new hospital on that land stopped through lack of funds in 1766. Eventually, much of its funds came from the Birmingham Triennial Music Festival, the first of which was held over three days in September 1768, and which continued to fund the hospital into the 20th century.

The hospital finally opened on 20 September 1779, giving its name to Hospital Street. About 200 patients were treated in its first three months of operation, even though the 40 beds were fewer than half those aimed for. Two, two-storey side wings were added in 1790. Further extensions were made in 1857 and 1880. Eventually 235 beds were provided on the site. It is now occupied by Centro House, headquarters of the Transport for West Midlands, where there is a blue plaque (at 52.487475°N 1.899811°W) commemorating the hospital.

=== Steelhouse Lane ===
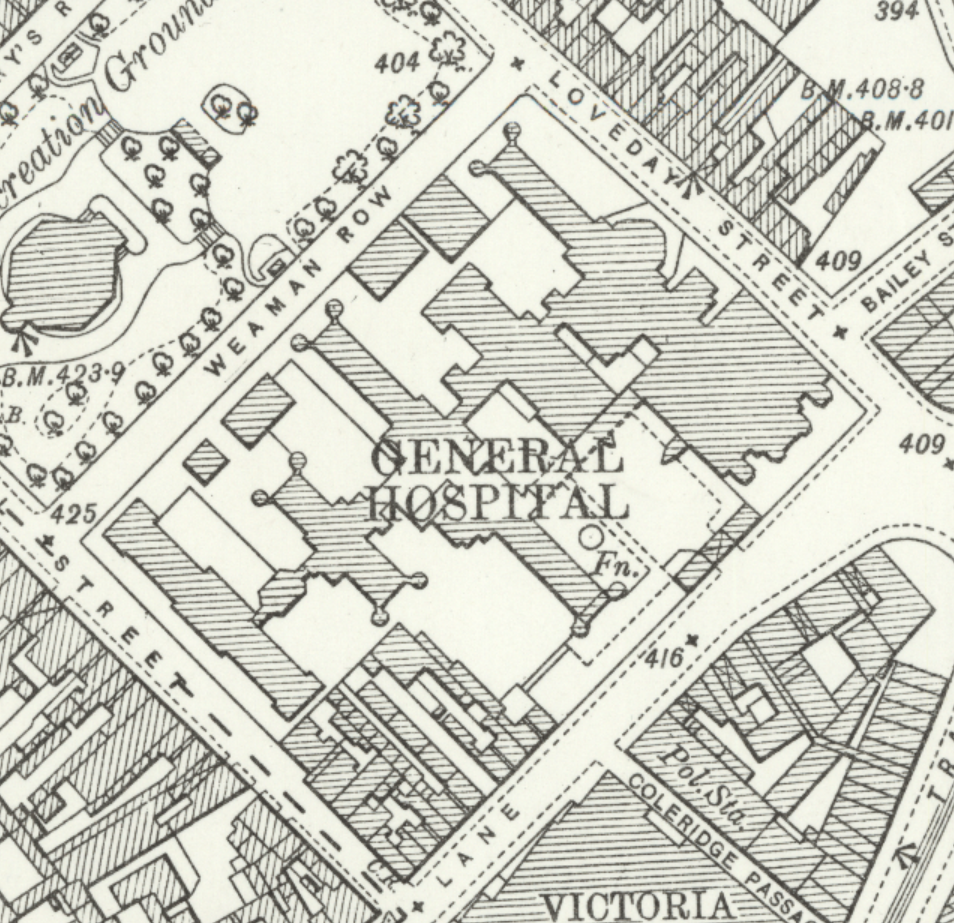
Birmingham General Hospital's Steelhouse Lane site, on the Ordnance Survey 25 inch map of 1892-1914

The hospital relocated to Steelhouse Lane in 1897, on a site formerly occupied by almshouses provided by Lench's Trust. The architect of the new, brick building was William Henman. Neville Chamberlain became the official visitor and then a director of the hospital. He advocated a larger facility, a cause in which he was eventually successful, though building did not commence until 1934. He was still fundraising while he was Prime Minister.

The hospital became part of the new National Health Service in 1948. Until 1964 the hospital was a training centre for nurses, who, on qualification, became members of the General Hospital Birmingham Nurses League. After 1964, training switched to Queen Elizabeth Hospital in the nearby suburb of Edgbaston. The league was wound up in 2000, due to its remaining members' increasing age.

The Birmingham pub bombings, the worst terrorist attack on the mainland until 2005, occurred within a mile of the hospital, on 21 November 1974. Taxi cabs and all available ambulances ferried victims to either the General or to the nearby Accident Hospital.

After Birmingham General Hospital closed in the mid-1990s, the main red brick building was adapted for use as Birmingham Children's Hospital which opened there in 1998.

== Notable staff ==
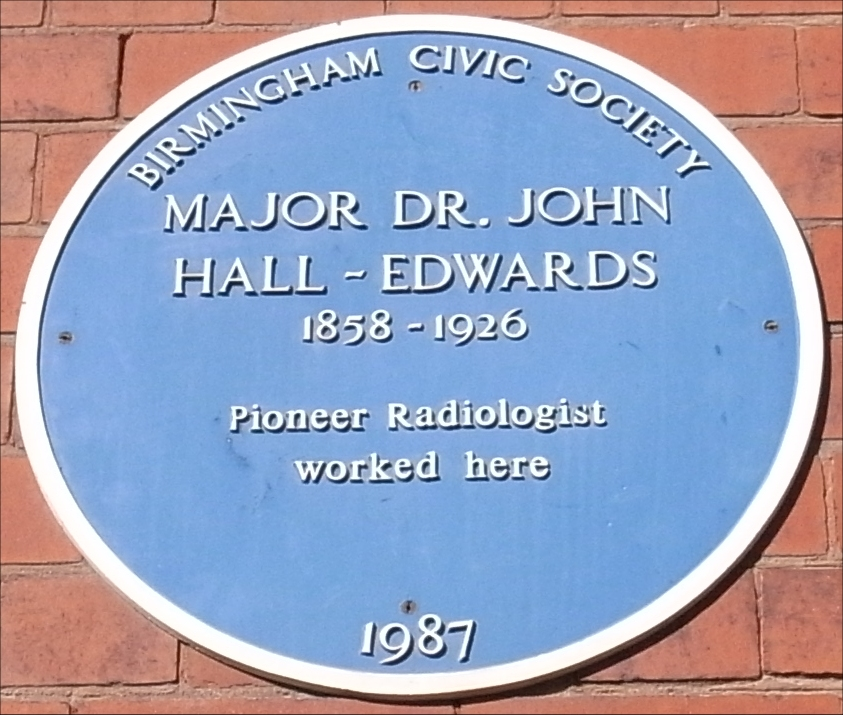
A Blue plaque placed on the Steelhouse Lane building in 1987 commemorates John Hall-Edwards

- John Ash (1723–1798)
- Richard Lindsey Batten (1920–1997)
- Sir William Bowman, 1st Baronet (1816–1892)
- Sir Thomas Frederick Chavasse (1854 - 1913)
- Balthazar Foster, 1st Baron Ilkeston (1840–1913)
- George Freer (founder of the city's Orthopaedic Hospital)
- Sampson Gamgee (1828–1886)
- John Hall-Edwards (1858–1926)
- Joseph Hodgson (1788–1869)
- John Johnstone (1801–1833)
- Robert Mills-Roberts (1862–1935)
- Dame Ellen Musson (1867–1960)
- Arthur Thomson (1890–1977)
- William Withering (1741–1799)

== Notable births ==
- Bert Harris (1873–1897), professional racing cyclist

== Notable deaths ==
- Arthur Lowe (1915-1982), Dad’s Army actor, best known for his role as Captain George Mainwaring, who died there aged 66 following a stroke

== Archives ==
Archives related to Birmingham General Hospital are held at the Cadbury Research Library, University of Birmingham.

== Arms ==
Coat of arms of Birmingham General Hospital
| Notes Granted 20 June 1933. Crest On a wreath of the colours between two mullets Or a cockatrice Gules holding in the dexter claw a trefoil gold. Escutcheon Argent two chevronels Sable on a pale Ermines a rose Gules barbed and seeded Proper between two trefoils also Gules. Motto Flecta Non Resiliet |
