= One Park West =

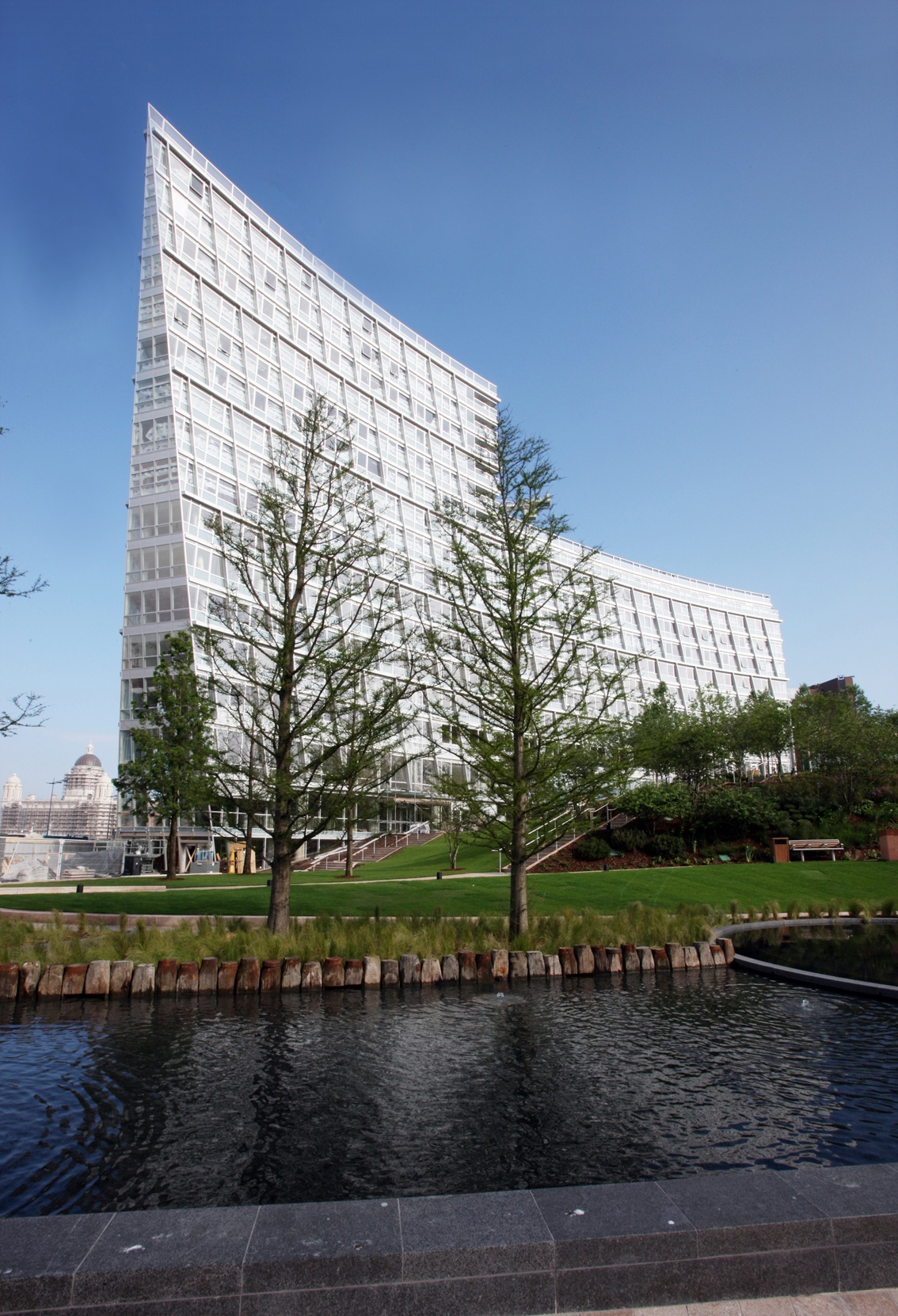
- Interactive map of the One Park West area

General information
- Type: Residential/Office
- Location: Chavasse Park, Liverpool, England, United Kingdom
- Coordinates: 53.404°N 2.989°W
- Construction started: 2006
- Completed: 2008

Height
- Roof: 52 metres (171 ft)

Technical details
- Floor count: 15

Design and construction
- Architect: César Pelli

One Park West is a 17-storey building in central Liverpool, England, designed by architect César Pelli. Bordering Chavasse Park, it is part of Liverpool One, a 42-acre (17 ha) £920m redevelopment of Liverpool's city centre. The developer was the Duke of Westminster's Grosvenor Group. One Park West consists of 326 apartments, offices, restaurants, cafés and parking. Blocks B and A of One Park West are the 21st and 31st tallest buildings in Liverpool respectively.

== Architecture ==
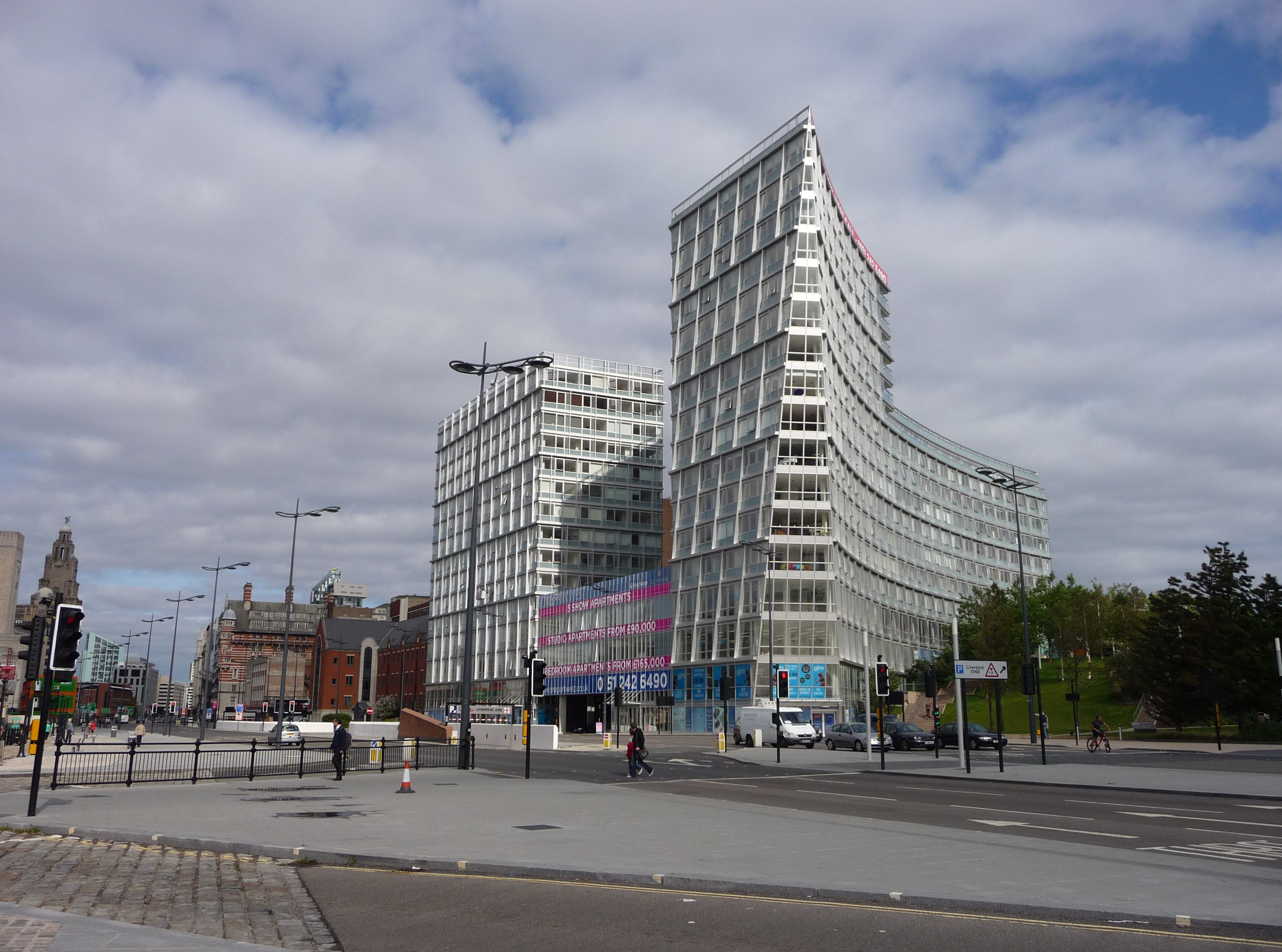
One Park West

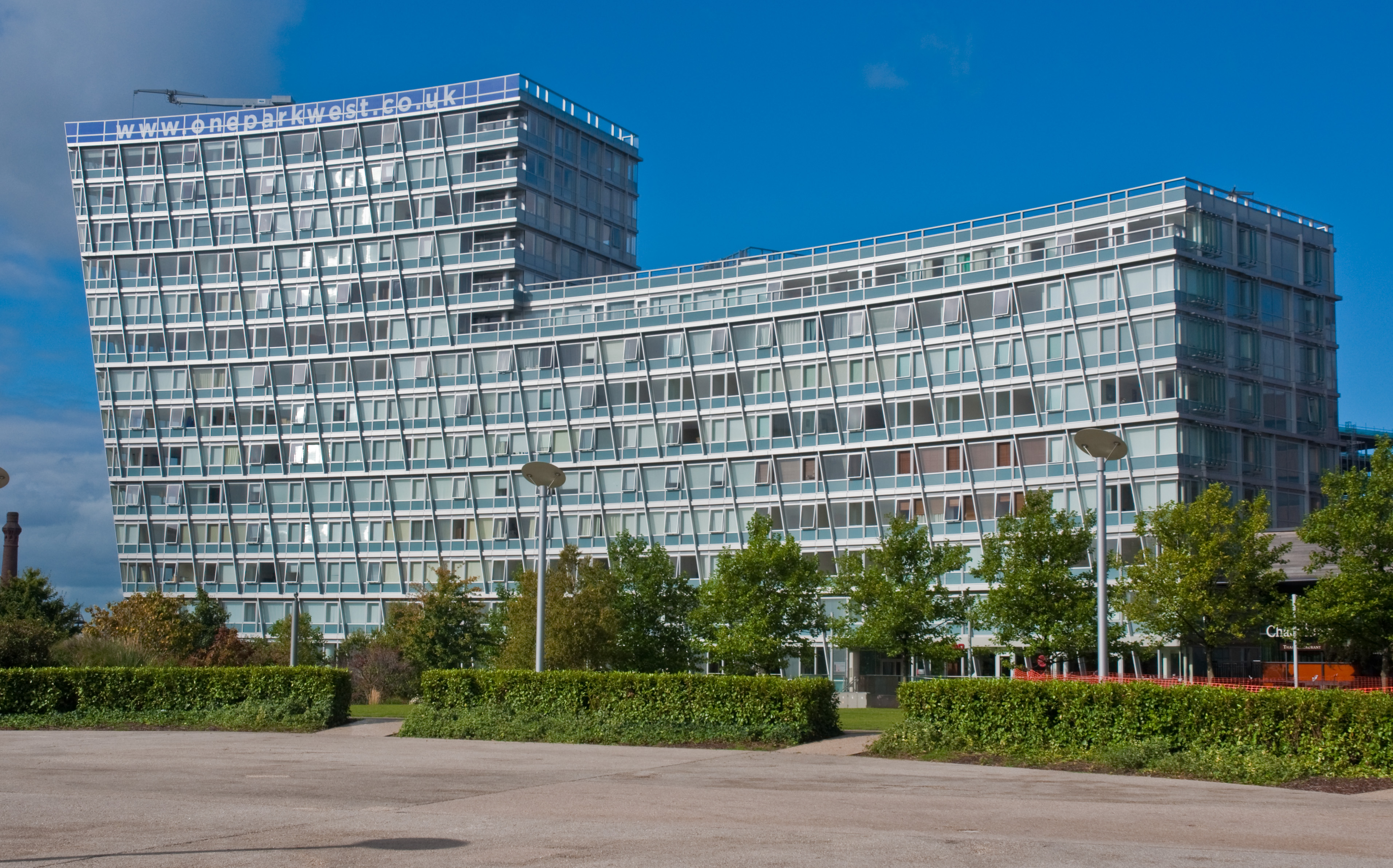
One Park West viewed from Chavasse Park

Argentinian architect César Pelli – best known for designing Petronas Towers in Kuala Lumpur – and his team at Pelli Clarke Pelli Architects worked with the masterplan of the Paradise Project to create a design that fitted with the proposal for the rest of the site. One Park West is the first Pelli-designed building in the UK outside London.

Pelli Clarke Pelli Architects team worked in partnership with Liverpool-based architects Brock Carmichael Architects to take the project through to planning. In their design justification for the site, both companies state the form of the new building was contextualised based on its setting, adjacent to Liverpool’s waterfront, a World Heritage Site including the Three Graces: the Royal Liver Building, the Port of Liverpool Building and the Cunard Building. The Strand and Park Towers border The Strand and Chavasse Park. The central tower rises the highest, forming the highest tower in Liverpool One. Its raking corner feature is designed to define the edge of the park.

The building is a concrete frame construction, clad in a modern clear and opaque glazed curtain wall. This has expressed horizontal floor levels and raked and vertical mullions which allow recessed glazed sections, designed to give the elevation a texture that responds to the movement of the sun. The raked mullion reflects the tower corner feature and from first floor level repeats at each third storey to provide further elevation order and character

Laing O'Rourke is the contractor working on One Park West.

Interior designers Kingston Shaw designed the two-bedroom show suite at One Park West, using a palette of colours selected to contrast with the building’s glass exterior. Contemporary artwork by local architect Trevor Skempton is also featured. Liverpool One's Sony Centre provided state of the art audio-visual equipment for the apartment, and offers One Park West residents an exclusive discount on their goods.

== Launch ==
One Park West was launched at Tate Liverpool on Thursday 22 February 2007. Developer the Grosvenor Group celebrated One Park West's construction reaching its highest point with a topping-out ceremony on Thursday 7 February 2008. Members of the project team and the leader of Liverpool City Council, Councillor Warren Bradley, were offered an item to be placed in a time capsule which was embedded into the building. The objects placed inside the capsule included a first sketch of the building, a copy of the Liverpool Daily Post from the day of the ceremony, a programme for Liverpool’s year as European Capital of Culture in 2008 and a DVD about One Park West. The ceremony included four significant elements being added to the final concrete mix; Cains beer, oil, water from the River Mersey and a yew branch to promote fertility, liberty, and wisdom, and to ward off evil spirits.

The building was officially opened by Grosvenor's owner, the Duke of Westminster, on 18 December 2008.

== Carbuncle Cup ==
In 2009 One Park West was nominated for the Carbuncle Cup for the title of the worst new building in the UK.
