= Chavasse family =

British family

The Chavasse family in the West Midlands is a British family of Catholic origin. When Claude Chavasse came from the borders of France and Savoy, he settled in Burford, Oxfordshire. His entry in the Burial Register there (April 1734) states: Claude Chavasse, a Roman Catholick (sic). Members of the family gained particular prominence as surgeons and clergymen. Members of the family still live in the United Kingdom today.

== History ==
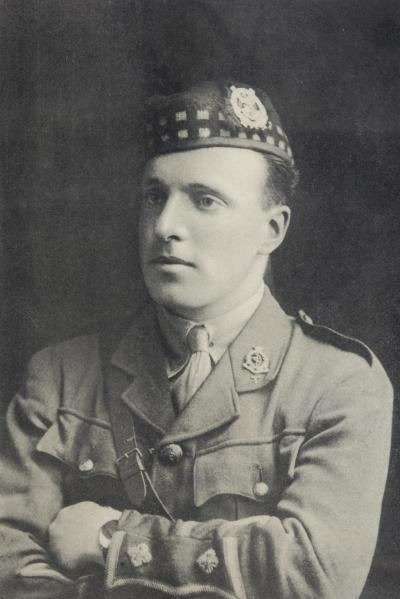
Noel Chavasse VC and Bar, wearing the glengarry of the Liverpool Scottish Regiment

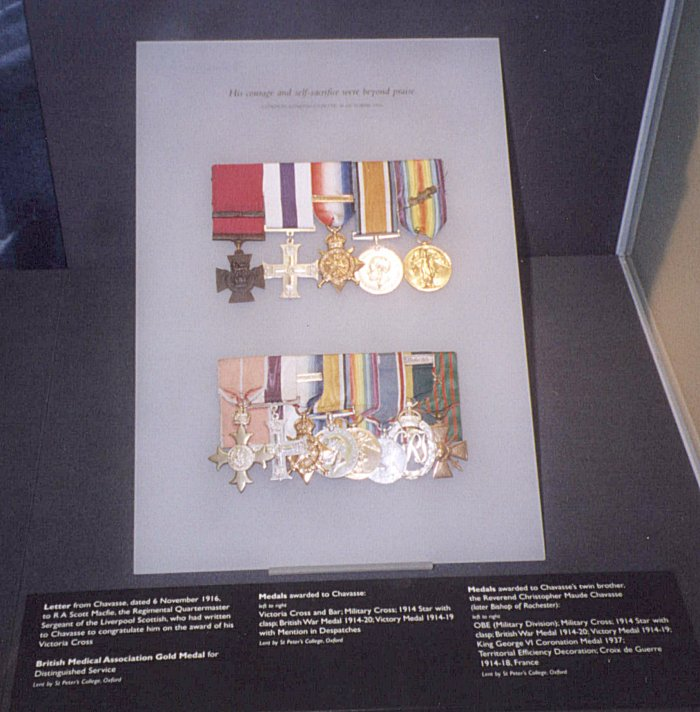
Medals of Noel and Christopher Chavasse. Noel's medals are top row. Christopher's medals are bottom row.

The Chavasse family includes two Bishops of the Church of England, two Olympic athletes, a Knight Bachelor and one of only three people to be awarded a Victoria Cross twice. Bishop Francis Chavasse was instrumental in the building of Liverpool Cathedral and founded St Peter's College, Oxford.

Claude Chavasse[1886-1971] was a Gaelic language activist and Irish republican, cousin to Noel Chavasse.

== Genealogy ==
1. Thomas Chavasse (* 7 May 1800 Warwick, Staffordshire; † 19 October 1884 Wylde Green House, Sutton Coldfield, Warwickshire) MD, FRCS; surgeon ∞ (I) 1827 Catherine Margaret Grant (* 1811; † 1842) ∞ (II) after 1842 Miriam Sarah Wyld (* ?; † ?). From these marriages he had nine children (4 sons, 5 daughters), including:
  1. (I) Charles Edward Chavasse (* 3 November 1840 Birmingham; † 4 August 1893 Sutton Coldfield, Warwickshire) ∞ Frances Lucy Evans (* 1839; † 1905), and had 7 children (3 sons, 4 daughters).
  2. (II) Francis Chavasse (* 27 September 1846 Sutton Coldfield, Warwickshire; † 11 March 1928 Oxford) Bishop of Liverpool, founder of St Peter's College, Oxford ∞ Ethel Jane Maude (* 1851; † 1927) and had 7 children (4 sons, 3 daughters), including identical twins:
    1. Christopher Chavasse (* 9 November 1884 Oxford; † 10 March 1962) OBE, MC, TD, DD; Bishop of Rochester, Olympic athlete ∞ 1919 Beatrice Cropper Willink (* ?; † 1977) and had 5 children (3 sons, 2 daughters).
    2. Noel Chavasse (* 9 November 1884 Oxford; † 4 August 1917 Brandhoek, Belgium) VC and Bar, MC; Captain, RAMC, Olympic athlete
    3. Francis Bernard Chavasse (* 1889; ?) MC, ophthalmic surgeon (joint author of Worth's Squint; 7th ed. by F. Bernard Chavasse; Baillière & Co., 1939)
    4. Aidan Chavasse (* 1891; † 4 July 1917 Flanders)
  3. (II) Sir Thomas Frederick Chavasse (* 19 March 1854 Aston, Warwickshire; † 17 February 1913 Bromsgrove, Worcestershire) Kt 1905, MD, FRCS; surgeon ∞ 1885 Frances Hannah Ryland (* 1848; † 1928) MBE and had 4 children (1 son, 3 daughters), including:
    1. Arthur Ryland Chavasse (* 1887; † 12 March 1916 Le Havre, France) MD, Captain, RAMC
    2. Frances Gladys Ryland Chavasse (* 1893; † 1962 Polignac, killed crossing the road) mentioned in despatches 1945 at Monte Cassino, former fiancée of the late Noel Chavasse VC and Bar, MC, later ∞ Rev. James F. Colquhoun (* 1881; † 1937) MC, priest
    3. Esme Margaret Ryland Chavasse (* 1896; † 1980) ∞ (I) Walter G. Marsden (* 1886; † 1920) Captain, RAMC ∞ (II) A. B. Quinney, of Sambourne (* 1890; † 1965)

== Memorials ==
- Chavasse Park in Liverpool, named after the family
- At St Peter's College, Oxford, the College Chapel is filled with memorials to members of the Chavasse family, including Captain Noel Chavasse's original grave cross, the Chavasse memorial window and a large bas-relief of Bishop Francis Chavasse at prayer.
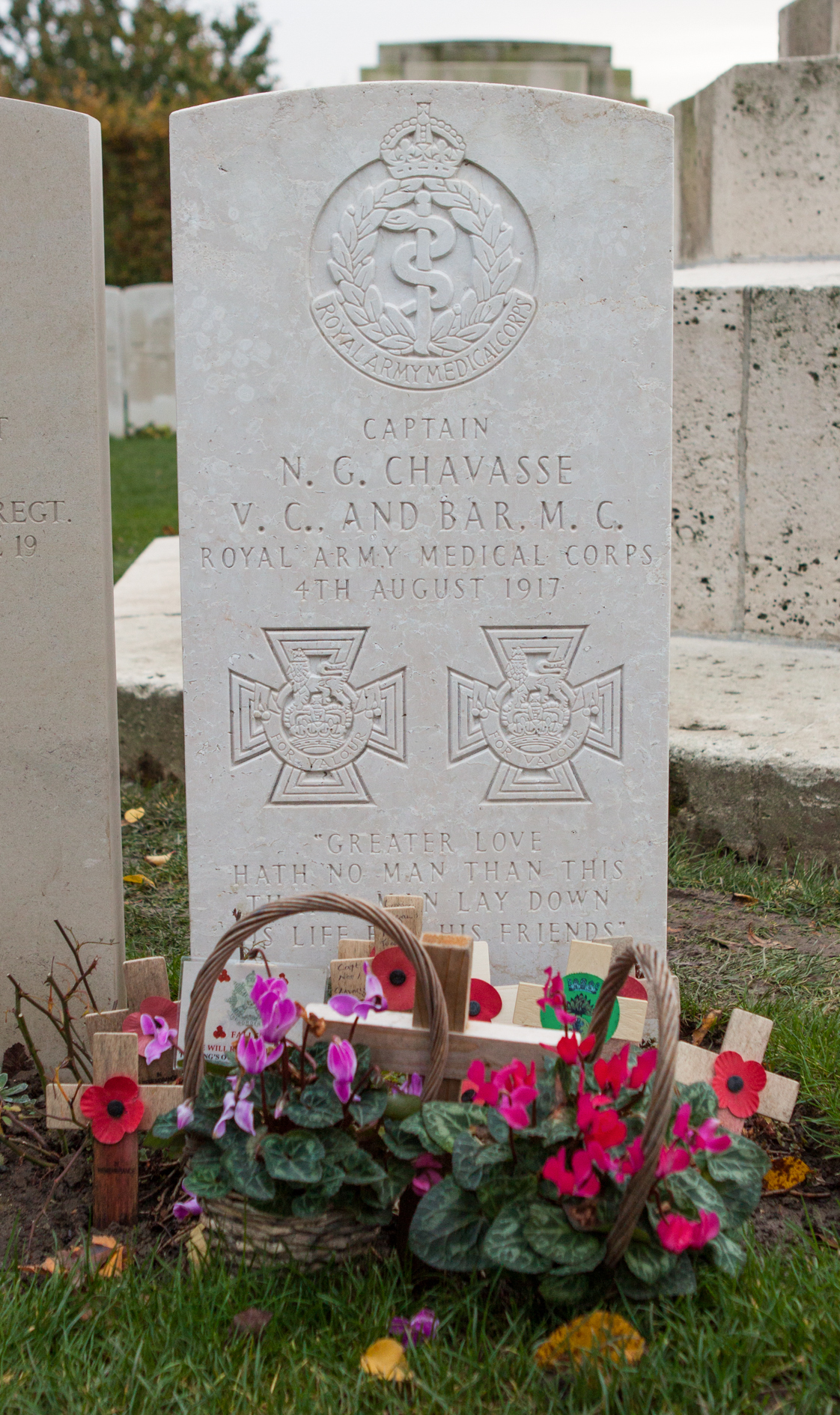
Noel Chavasse's headstone in Brandhoek New Military Cemetery

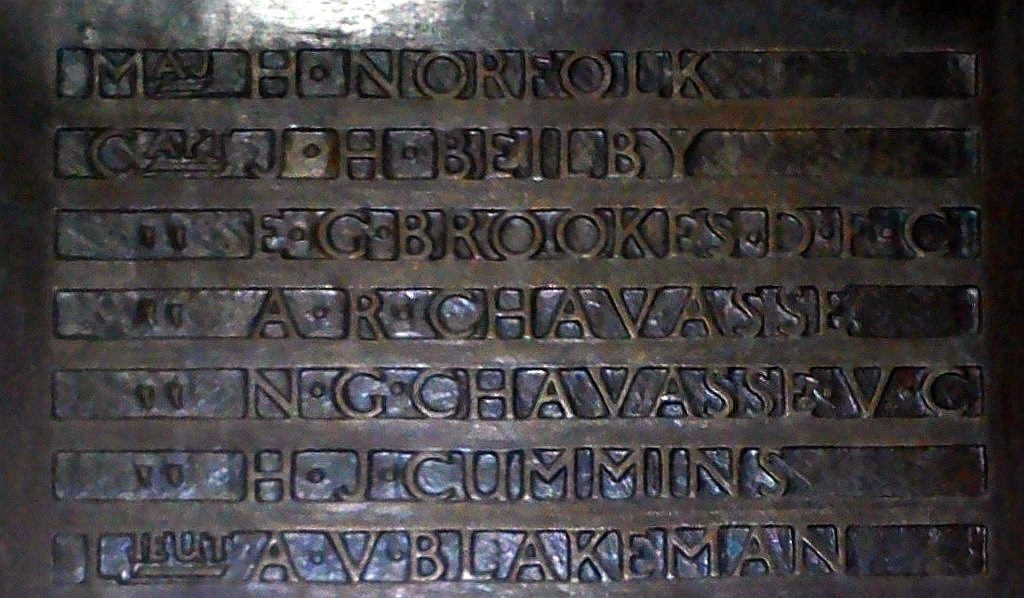
War Memorial in St John the Baptist Church, Bromsgrove with Arthur and Noel Chavasse's names

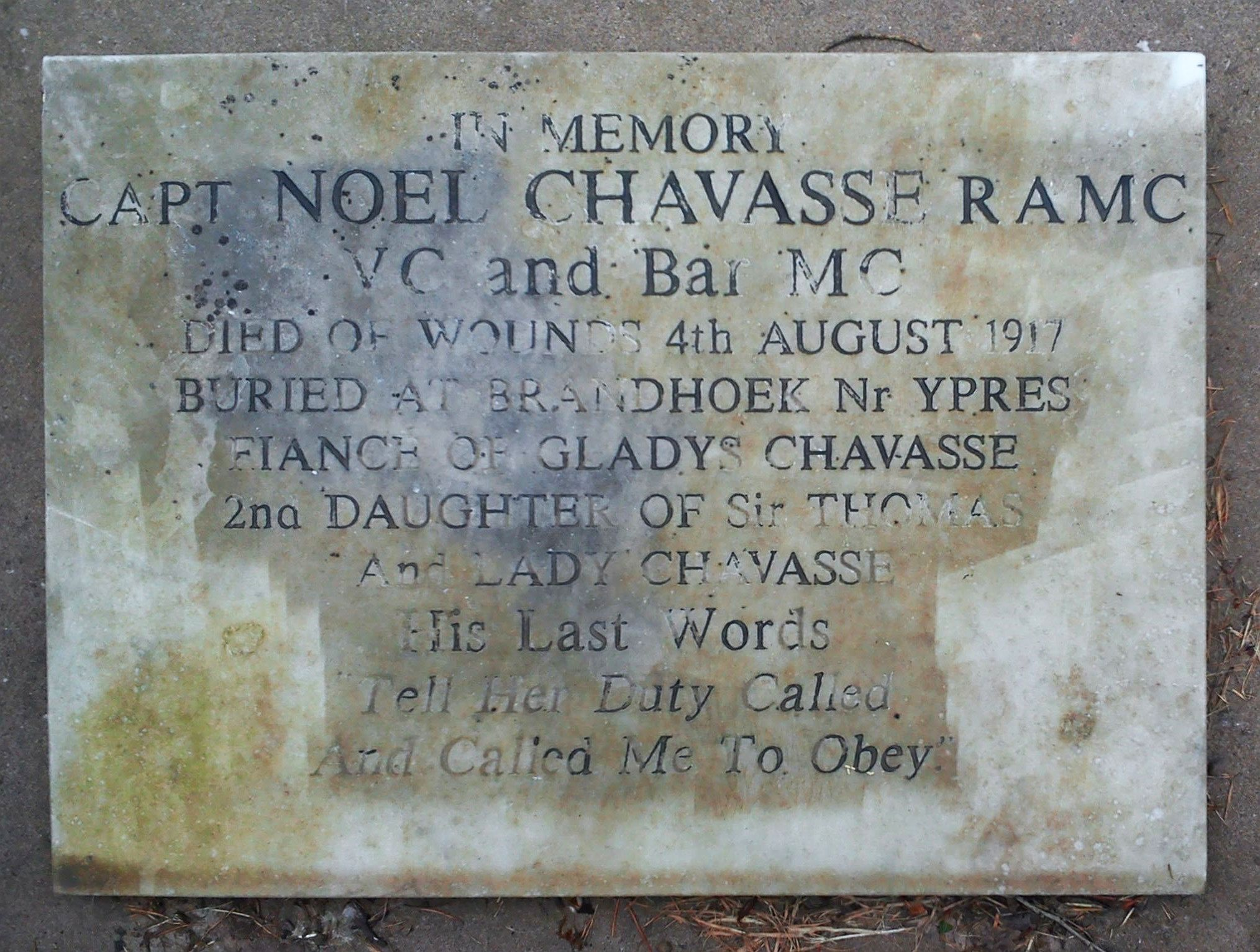
Noel Chavasse's memorial at the Chavasse family grave at Bromsgrove

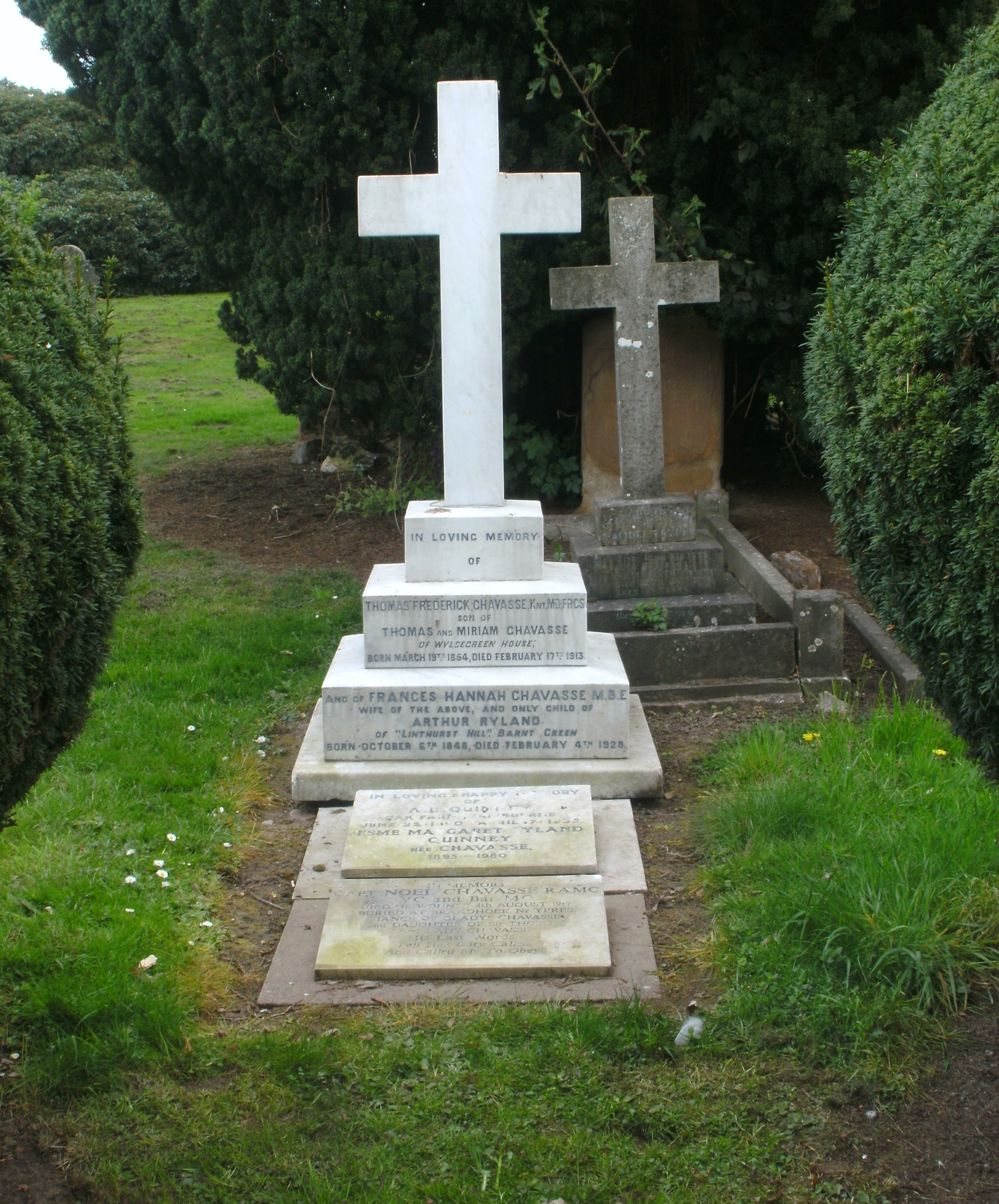
Grave of Sir Thomas Chavasse (1854-1913) and his family at Bromsgrove

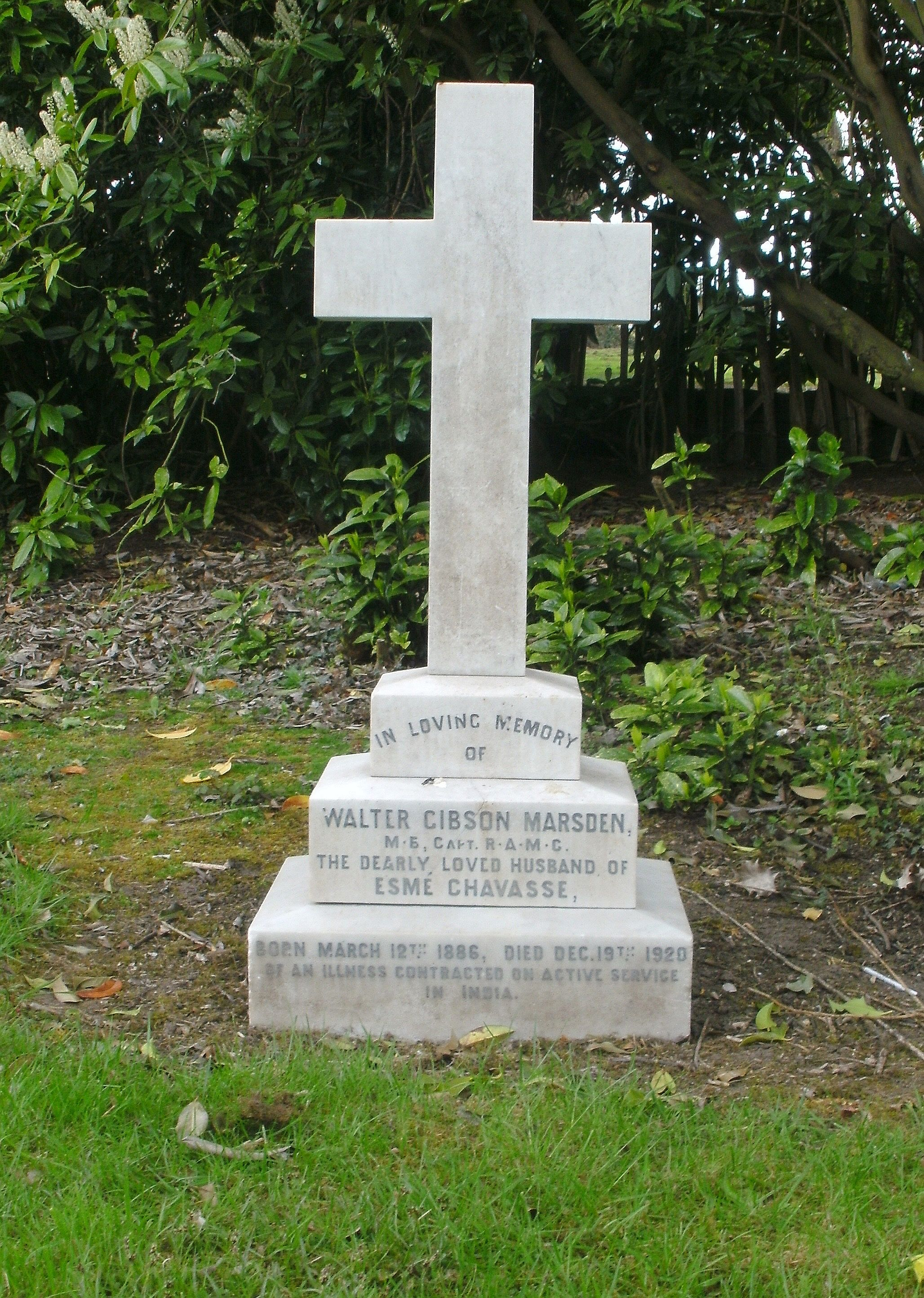
Captain W. G. Marsden's headstone - first husband of Esme Chavasse (1896-1980)
