= Thomas Frederick Chavasse =

Sir Thomas Chavasse FRCS
- Born: 19 March 1854; Wylde Green, Warwickshire, England
- Died: 17 February 1913 (aged 58); Barnt Green, Worcestershire, England
- Education: University of Edinburgh
- Occupation: Surgeon
- Spouse: Frances Hannah Ryland (m. 1885)
- Children: 4
- Medical career
- Institutions: Birmingham General Hospital

Sir Thomas Frederick Chavasse, FRCSE, FRCS (19 March 1854 – 17 February 1913) was an English surgeon, who learned the practice of antiseptic surgery from Joseph Lister in Edinburgh and remained an exponent of this technique throughout his career. As a surgeon at the Birmingham General Hospital he was influential in the design of the new hospital in 1897 and was an active fundraiser for the project. An active supporter of the British Red Cross Society and the St John's Ambulance Brigade, he was knighted in 1905.

== Early life ==
Chavasse was born in Wylde Green, Warwickshire, the sixth son of Thomas Chavasse (1800–1884), a surgeon with a practice in Birmingham and then in rural Warwickshire. Thomas the son began to study medicine at Queen's College, Birmingham with clinical teaching at Birmingham General Hospital. He then enrolled as an undergraduate at the University of Edinburgh Medical School. Here his teachers included Joseph Lister from whom he learned at first hand the value of antiseptic techniques in surgery. He graduated MB CM in 1876. After graduation he spent six months in Vienna attending the clinic of Theodore Billroth, who, at that time, was pioneering the surgery of the abdomen. Billroth's clinic attracted young surgeons from all over Europe and amongst Chavasse's fellow postgraduate students was an Edinburgh contemporary Dr (later Sir) George Andreas Berry. From Vienna he continued his studies at the Charité in Berlin under Bernhard von Langenbeck the surgeon credited with establishing scientific surgery in Germany. On return to Edinburgh he was house surgeon to Professor James Spence in the old Royal Infirmary of Edinburgh. Spence was resolutely opposed to the practice of antiseptic surgery, which meant that Chavasse had to be diplomatic about his enthusiasm for Listerian antisepsis. He furthered his knowledge of antisepsis, without offending his chief, by regularly attending Lister's Sunday afternoon clinic. In 1878 he obtained the higher degree of MD and passed the examinations to become a Fellow of the Royal College of Surgeons of Edinburgh (FRCSEd).

== Surgical career ==
In 1878 Chavasse applied for the post of assistant surgeon at the Birmingham General Hospital, but to be appointed he needed to present his fellowship diploma. Although he had passed the examinations he could not obtain the diploma as he had not reached the statutory age of 25. The RCSEd suspended this bylaw to enable Chavasse to receive his diploma and he was appointed to the post. He never forgot what he regarded as a great act of kindness by the college. Twenty-one years later he wrote to the then President, Sir Patrick Heron Watson expressing his thanks and donating a sum which the college used to buy the Chavasse Cup.

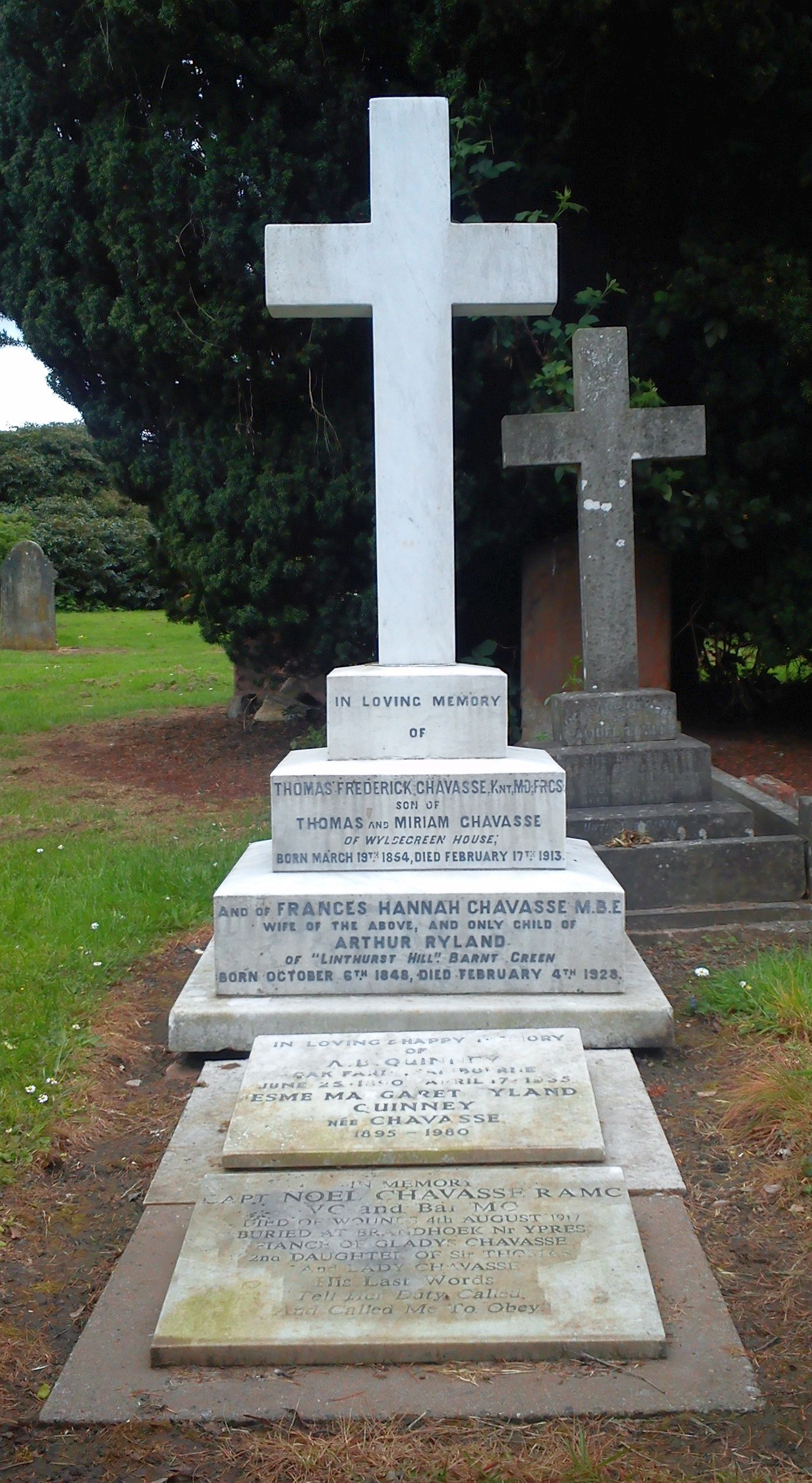
Sir Thomas Frederick Chavasse's grave in Bromsgrove cemetery

He was appointed full surgeon in 1881 when aged only 27, an unusually senior appointment at that age. He became senior surgeon to the hospital in 1894, retiring in 1912 when he became consulting surgeon. Chavasse was influential in the design and the re-building of the hospital when it relocated to Steelhouse Lane in 1897. He helped to finance this by obtaining endowments from family and acquaintances. He was admitted to the FRCS(Eng) in 1899. Chavasse remained an ardent exponent of Listerian antisepsis throughout his career.

He also acted as Consulting Surgeon at the Corbett Hospital, Stourbridge and also to the Dispensary at Sutton Coldfield. He was president of the Midland Medical Society, president of the Birmingham branch of the British Medical Association (BMA) and president of the Birmingham Medical Institute. At the meeting of the BMA in Birmingham in 1911 he was President of the Section of Surgery. He was an active supporter of the British Red Cross Society and the St John's Ambulance Brigade. Chavasse was knighted in 1905.

== Death ==
While hunting on 13 December 1912, he fell and suffered multiple fractures of the femur. He appeared to be recovering from this but died suddenly at his home at Barnt Green, Worcestershire on 17 February 1913, probably from a pulmonary embolism. He and his family are buried in Bromsgrove cemetery.

== Family ==
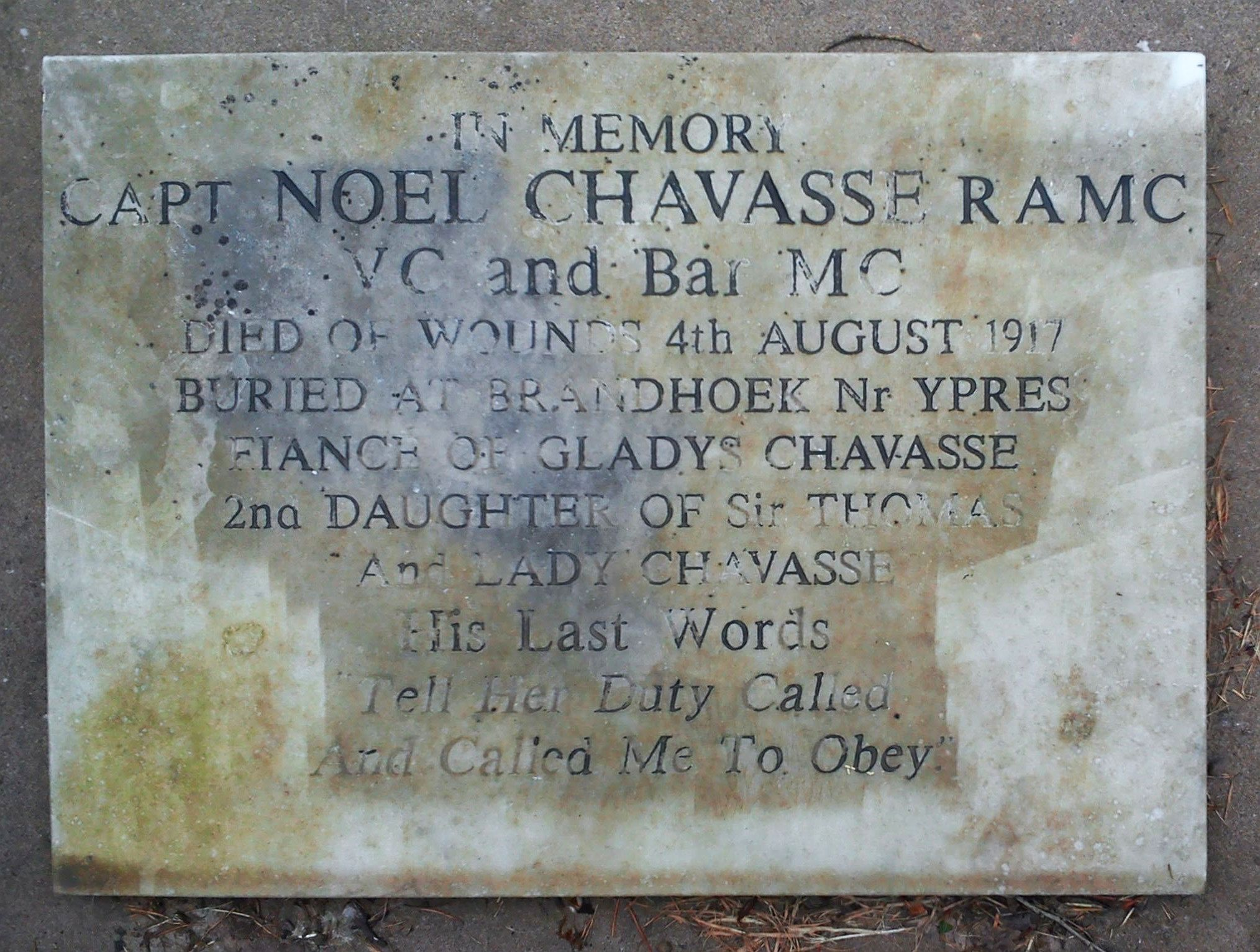
Noel Chavasse VC and Bar's memorial at the Chavasse family grave at Bromsgrove

He was a member of the notable Chavasse family. His nephew Noel Chavasse (1884–1917), a doctor, was awarded the VC twice, and was killed at the Battle of Passchendaele. At the time of his death he was engaged to his first cousin, Frances Chavasse, daughter of our subject Sir Thomas Frederick Chavasse.

In 1885, Chavasse married Frances Hannah Ryland. Their son, Arthur Ryland Chavasse MD (1887–1916), became a Captain in the Royal Army Medical Corps and was killed in World War I. They had three daughters: Gwendoline, Frances and Esme.

== Selected bibliography ==
- "Clinical remarks on amputation at the hip Joint". British Medical Journal (1884);1218:849–850
- "Successful Removal of the Entire Upper Extremity for Osteochondroma". Medico.-Chirurgical Transactions, (1890):1978:81
- "Modern methods of amputating at the hip-joint". Lancet 1900. 156:176–178.
