= George Vale Owen =

English clergyman (1869–1931)

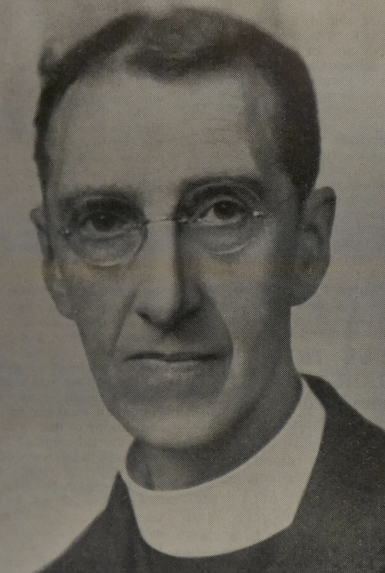
- Born: 26 June 1869; Birmingham
- Died: 9 March 1931 (aged 61); Farnborough
- Occupation: Clergyman

George Vale Owen (26 June 1869 – 9 March 1931) was a clergyman of the Church of England and one of the best-known spiritualists of the early twentieth century.

== Early life ==
Vale Owen was born in Birmingham, England, the eldest son of George Owen, a chemist and druggist, and his wife Emma. He was educated at the Midland Institute and Queen's College, Birmingham (a predecessor college of Birmingham University).

== Career ==
In 1893 he was ordained by the Bishop of Liverpool as curate in the parish of Seaforth, in Liverpool. He became curate successively at Fairfield in 1895 and St Matthew's, Scotland Road, in 1897, both also in Liverpool. In 1900 he became vicar of Orford, Warrington, where he created a new church, which was built in 1908, and worked there until 1922.

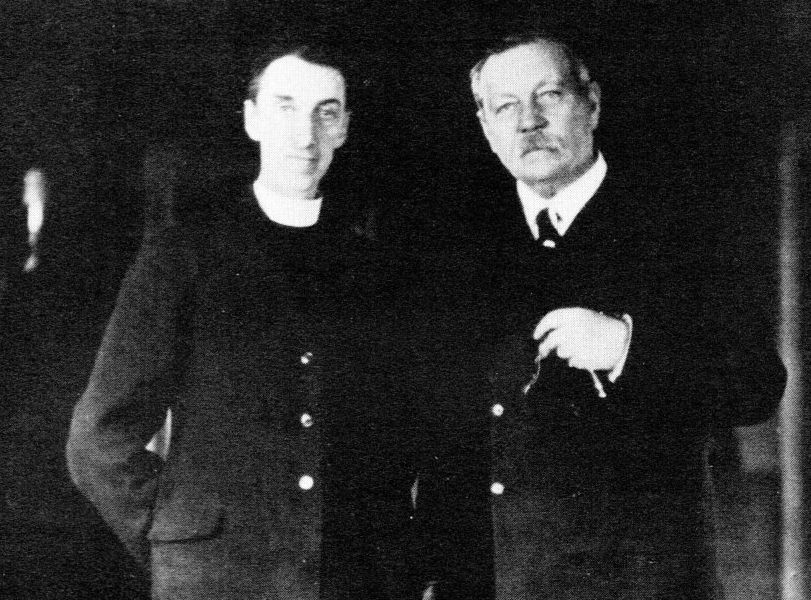
George Vale Owen with Sir Arthur Conan Doyle, New York 1923.

== Spiritualism ==
The death of his mother in 1909 awoke his alleged psychic abilities and he claimed to began receiving psychic communication in 1913. He received 'messages' via a process known as automatic writing, which adherents believe is writing performed without conscious thought or deliberation, typically by means of spontaneous free association or as a medium for alleged spirits or psychic forces.

Given the impact on him of the information he received in this way, he converted to Spiritualism. This was to incur the disapproval of his bishop, Francis Chavasse.

The 'messages' he received were developed into books. During the 1920s he authored a number of books about his new faith, his most notable being the five-volume set, Life Beyond the Veil. The works were prefaced by Sir Arthur Conan Doyle (creator of Sherlock Holmes), who was a great supporter of Owen.

Lord Northcliffe, the foremost newspaper proprietor of the day, published summaries of the works of Owen in his journal, The Weekly Dispatch. He said that he was impressed by the great sincerity and unshakeable conviction of Owen and that he clearly possessed great spiritual gifts. Through the publication of his work in the Dispatch, Owen became famous throughout the United Kingdom.

Owen's spiritualist work resulted in the Church authorities forcing him out of his parish. This had a severe impact on him, including the loss of his primary source of income. In 1922, aged 53, he began actively promoting Spiritualism. He first went on a lecture tour in the United States. In England, after his return, he gave more than 150 lectures.

He eventually became pastor of a Spiritualist congregation in London.

However, his financial resources became severely depleted. To help him, Conan Doyle organised a collection for him. This resulted in a trust fund that provided financial support for Owen for the rest of his life.

== Personal life ==
Owen married Rose Pemberton on 21 November 1892 at St James church in Handsworth; they had four children.

== Death ==
In 1931 he fell seriously ill, exacerbated by the strain of his work as a medium. He died at his home in Farnborough on 9 March of that year, aged 61.
