= Noel Godfrey Chavasse =

English medical doctor, Olympic athlete and British Army officer (1884-1917)

Noel Chavasse VC & Bar MC
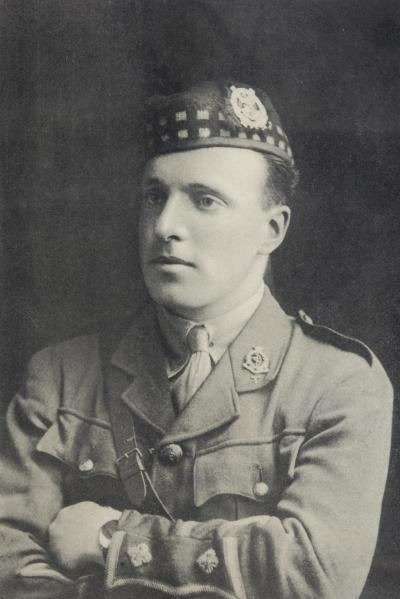
- Portrait of N.G. Chavasse wearing the glengarry of the Liverpool Scottish
- Born: 9 November 1884; Oxford, Oxfordshire, England
- Died: 4 August 1917 (aged 32); Brandhoek, Passchendaele salient, Belgium
- Burial place: Brandhoek New Military Cemetery
- Education: Trinity College, Oxford (MA)
- Relatives: Francis Chavasse (father); Christopher Chavasse (brother); Aidan Chavasse (brother)
- Military career
- Allegiance: United Kingdom
- Branch: British Army
- Service years: 1913–1917
- Rank: Captain
- Units: Royal Army Medical Corps
- Conflicts: First World War; Western Front; Battle of the Somme; Battle of Guillemont (WIA); Battle of Passchendaele; Battle of Pilckem Ridge (DOW)
- Awards: Victoria Cross & Bar; Military Cross; Mentioned in Despatches
- Other work: Olympic athlete

Captain Noel Godfrey Chavasse, VC & Bar, MC (9 November 1884 – 4 August 1917) was an English medical doctor, Olympic athlete, and British Army officer from the Chavasse family. He is one of three people to be awarded a Victoria Cross twice, the others being Arthur Martin-Leake and Charles Upham.

The Battle of Guillemont saw acts of heroism by Chavasse, the only man to be awarded the Victoria Cross twice during the First World War. In 1916, he was hit by shell splinters while rescuing men in no-man's land. It is said he got as close as 25 yards to the German line, where he found three men and continued throughout the night under a constant rain of sniper bullets and bombing. He performed similar heroics in the early stages of the offensive at Passchendaele in August 1917 to gain a second VC and become the most highly decorated British officer of the First World War. He died of wounds suffered at Passchendaele in 1917.

== Childhood ==
Noel Godfrey Chavasse was the younger of identical twin boys born to the Rev. Francis Chavasse (later Bishop of Liverpool and founder of St Peter's College, Oxford) and Edith Jane Chavasse (née Maude) on 9 November 1884 at 36 New Inn Hall Street, Oxford. Christopher Maude Chavasse was born 20 minutes before his brother. In all, there were seven children born to the Chavasse family, in age order: Dorothea, Christopher, Noel, Edith, Mary, Francis and Aidan. The twins were so small and weak at birth that their baptism was delayed until 29 December 1884, and both were very ill with typhoid in their first year of life.

Chavasse was educated at Magdalen College School in Cowley Place, Oxford, where a blue plaque was dedicated to him in 2005, Liverpool College and Trinity College, Oxford. The family grew up in Oxford until, on 3 March 1900, Francis Chavasse was offered the Anglican Bishopric of Liverpool. The move was not without regrets as Liverpool during this time was one of the busiest seaports in the Empire and had a great deal of religious turmoil. The family moved to the Bishop's Palace at 19 Abercromby Square, Liverpool. Noel and Christopher went to school at Liverpool College, where they excelled at sports from the start. Their academic progress was initially rather slower, but as they grew older, both did well until, in 1904, both were admitted to Trinity College, Oxford.

== University and early professional career ==
In 1907, Noel graduated with First-class honours but Christopher failed, leading to a nervous breakdown. Both of them stayed at Oxford, Noel to study medicine and Christopher to retake his exams. During their time at Trinity, both men had not neglected their sports, rugby union being a favourite of theirs. In 1908, both twins represented Great Britain in the Olympic Games in the 400 metres. Noel finished third in his heat while Christopher finished second, but only the heat winners progressed to the semi-finals.

In January 1909, Noel joined the Oxford University Officers' Training Corps Medical Unit. By the following May, he was promoted to lance-sergeant. Noel finished his studies at Oxford in July 1909 and returned to Liverpool to continue his studies under such eminent teachers as Sir Robert Jones, who went on to become a leading authority in orthopaedic surgery.

On returning to Liverpool, Chavasse resumed his connection with the Grafton Street Industrial School, an institution for homeless boys in Liverpool. In the autumn, he went to London to sit his examination for Fellowship of the Royal College of Surgeons. He failed, apparently because of ill health. When he sat the examination again in May 1910, he passed it with ease. In the meantime, Christopher was well into his studies for the ministry under his father's guidance. Noel progressed through his studies, having studied pathology and bacteriology. He was obliged to undertake a hospital "placement" as part of his course. He found a position at the Rotunda Hospital in Dublin. Whilst Chavasse liked Dublin, his first experience of coming into contact with Roman Catholic clergy disturbed him.

In January 1912, Chavasse passed his final medical examination and was awarded the university's premier medical prize, the Derby Exhibition, in March of that year. On 22 July 1912, he registered as a doctor with the General Medical Council. His first placement was at the Royal Southern Hospital in Liverpool, initially until 31 March 1913, and then for a further six months. He then became house surgeon to Robert Jones, his former tutor.

== Military career and decorations ==
In early 1913, after discussions with some of his fellow doctors, Chavasse applied for and was accepted by the Royal Army Medical Corps (RAMC); he was commissioned as a lieutenant on 2 June. Thanks to one of his mentors, Dr McAlistair, who was then Surgeon-Captain of the 10th Battalion of the King's (Liverpool Regiment), the Liverpool Scottish, he was attached to the battalion as Surgeon-Lieutenant. The 10th Kings had been a Territorial battalion since the Haldane Reforms in 1909. Chavasse joined the battalion on 2 June 1913 and was welcomed by Lieutenant-Colonel W. Nicholl, the commanding officer. As an officer in a Territorial unit, Chavasse now had to attend to both his civilian and military duties.

During the First World War, Chavasse was a captain with the Royal Army Medical Corps, British Army attached to the 1/10th (Scottish) Battalion of the King's (Liverpool Regiment), part of the 55th (West Lancashire) Division.

Chavasse was awarded the Military Cross for gallantry at Hooge, Belgium in June 1915, although the award was not gazetted until 14 January 1916. He was promoted captain on 1 April 1915; on 30 November 1915 that year he was Mentioned in Despatches.

=== Victoria Cross ===
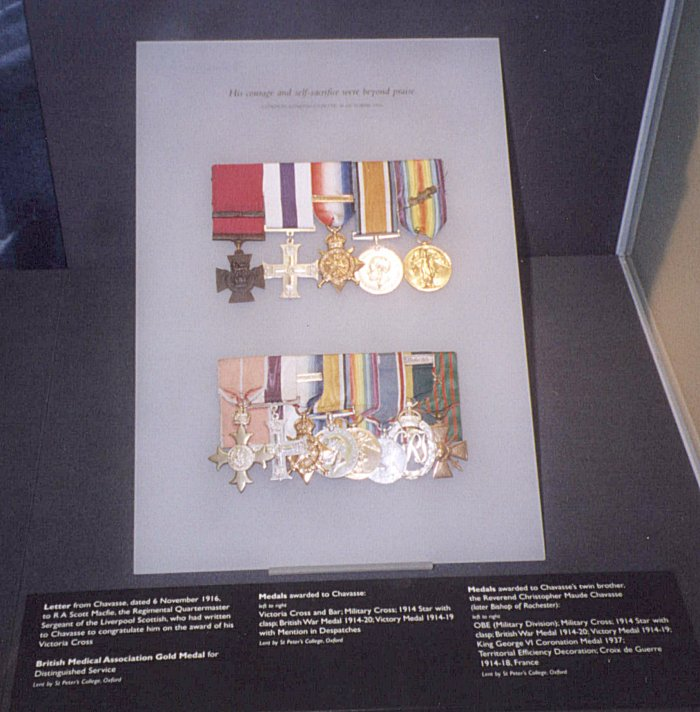
Medals of Noel and Christopher Chavasse. Noel's medals are top row. Christopher's medals are bottom row.

Chavasse was first awarded the VC for his actions on 9 August 1916, at Guillemont, France, when he attended to the wounded all day under heavy fire. The full citation was published on 24 October 1916 and read:

Captain Noel Godfrey Chavasse, M.C., M.B., Royal Army Medical Corps.

For most conspicuous bravery and devotion to duty.

During an attack, he tended the wounded in the open all day, under heavy fire, frequently in view of the enemy. During the ensuing night, he searched for wounded on the ground in front of the enemy's lines for four hours.

The next day, he took one stretcher-bearer to the advanced trenches and, under heavy shell fire, carried an urgent case for 500 yards into safety, being wounded in the side by a shell splinter during the journey. The same night, he took up a party of twenty volunteers, rescued three wounded men from a shell hole twenty-five yards from the enemy's trench, buried the bodies of two officers, and collected many identity discs, although fired on by bombs and machine guns.

Altogether, he saved the lives of some twenty badly wounded men, besides the ordinary cases that passed through his hands. His courage and self-sacrifice were beyond praise.

=== Bar to Victoria Cross ===
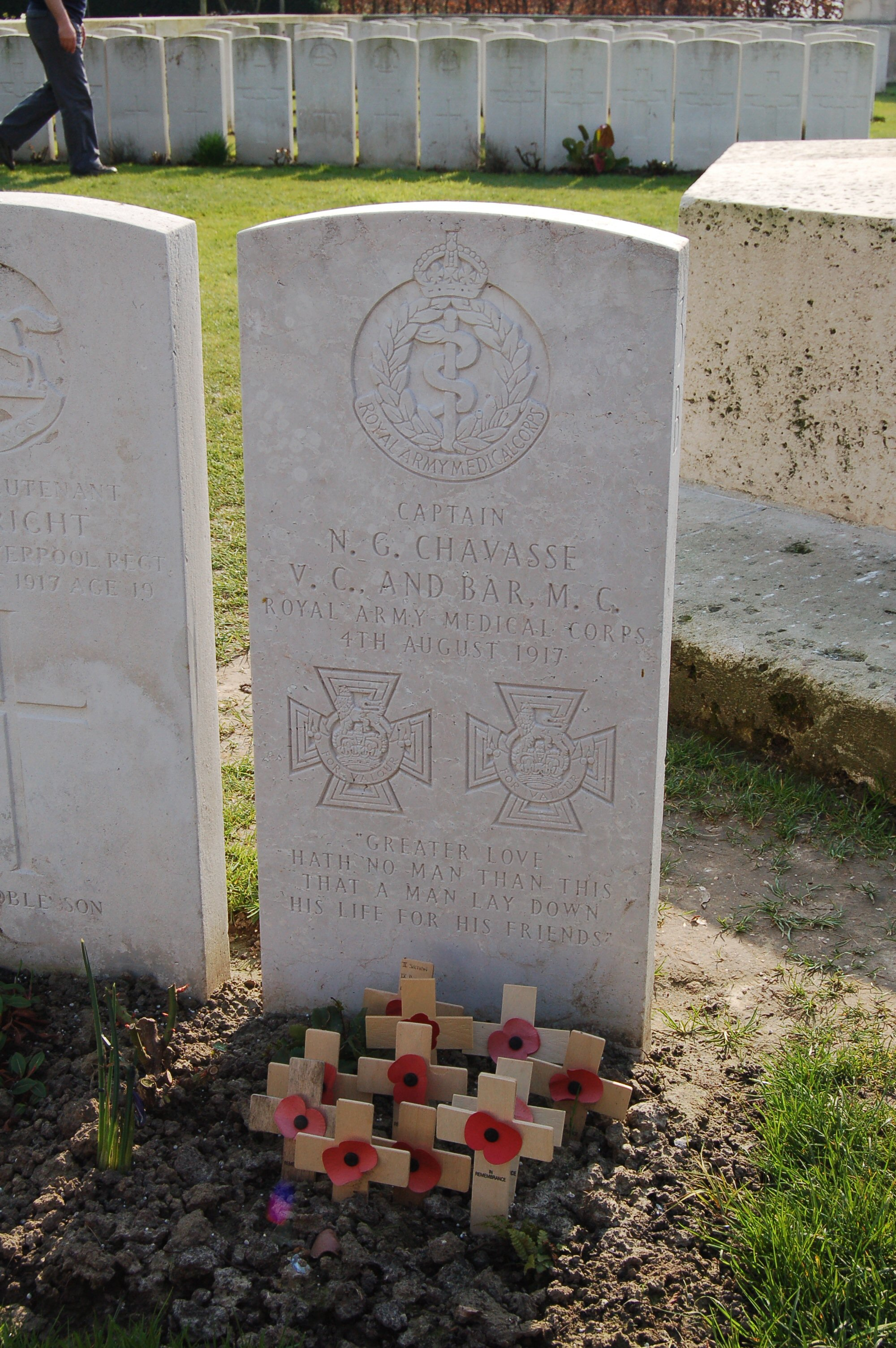
Chavasse's headstone in Brandhoek New Military Cemetery.

Chavasse's second award was made during the period 31 July to 2 August 1917, at Wieltje, Belgium; the full citation was published on 14 September 1917 and read:

War Office, September, 1917.

His Majesty the KING has been graciously pleased to approve of the award of a Bar to the Victoria Cross to Capt. Noel Godfrey Chavasse, V.C., M.C., late R.A.M.C., attd. L'pool R.

For most conspicuous bravery and devotion to duty when in action.

Though severely wounded early in the action while carrying a wounded soldier to the Dressing Station, Capt. Chavasse refused to leave his post and, for two days, not only continued to perform his duties but, in addition, went out repeatedly under heavy fire to search for and attend to the wounded who were lying out.

During these searches, although practically without food during this period, worn with fatigue and faint with his wound, he assisted in carrying in a number of badly wounded men over heavy and difficult ground.

Through his extraordinary energy and inspiring example, he was instrumental in rescuing many wounded who would have otherwise undoubtedly succumbed under the bad weather conditions.

This devoted and gallant officer subsequently died of his wounds.

Chavasse died of his wounds in Brandhoek and is buried at Brandhoek New Military Cemetery, Vlamertinge. His military headstone carries, uniquely, a representation of two Victoria Crosses.

Chavasse was the only man to be awarded both a Victoria Cross and Bar in the First World War and one of only three men ever to have achieved this distinction.

== Personal life ==
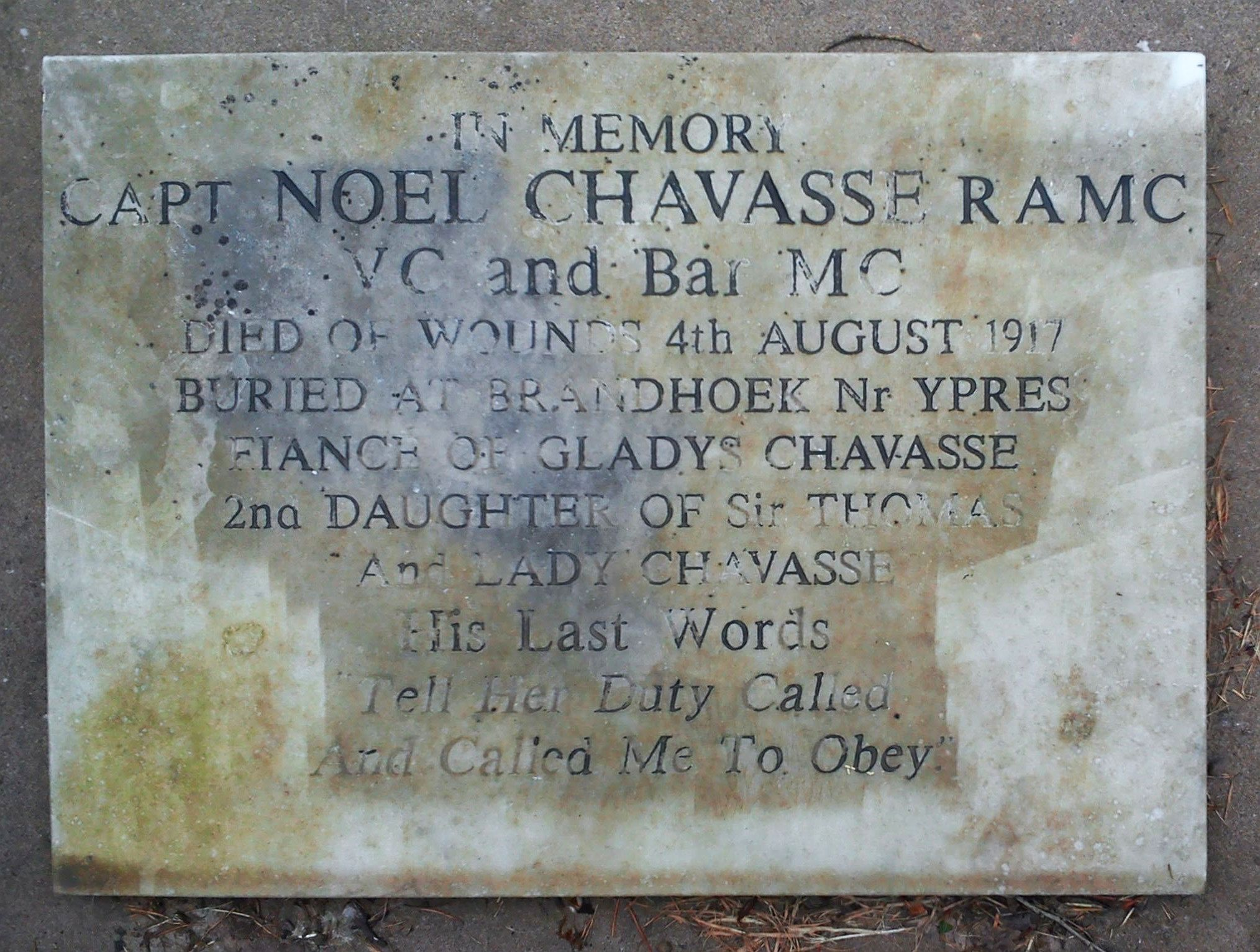
Noel's memorial at the Chavasse family grave at Bromsgrove

At the time of his death, Chavasse was engaged to one of his cousins, Frances Gladys Ryland Chavasse, daughter of his uncle Sir Thomas Frederick Chavasse of Bromsgrove, a surgeon. Noel's engagement is mentioned on a plaque at the Chavasse family grave at Bromsgrove. Gladys Chavasse was mentioned in despatches 1945 at Monte Cassino, Italy, and killed in 1962 in an accident in France while crossing the road.

Noel's nephew – Christopher Chavasse's son – was named in his honour and served as an aide to Bernard Montgomery, as well as being awarded the Military Cross in the Second World War.

== Commemorations ==
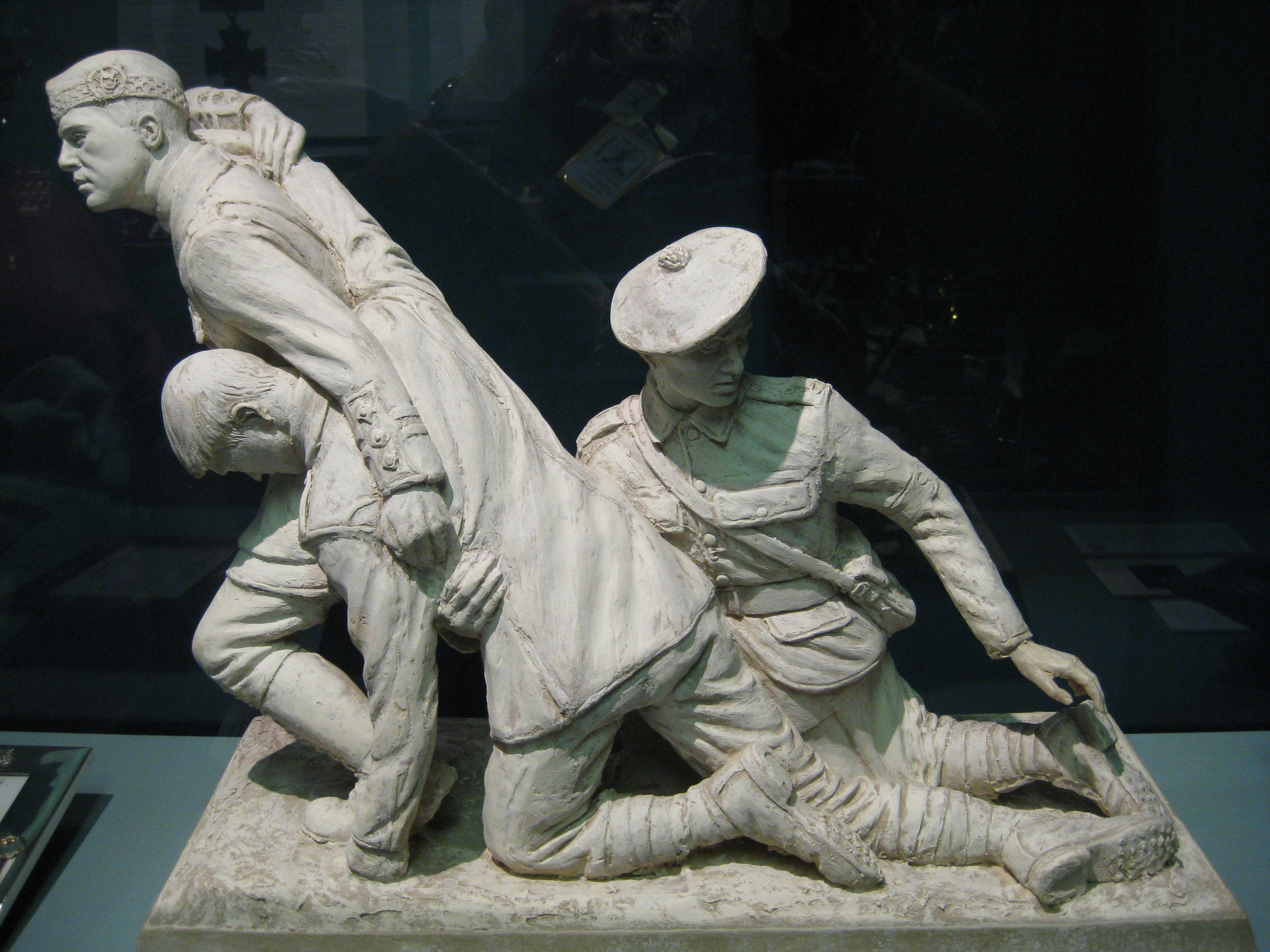
Noel Chavasse Memorial on display at the Army Medical Services Museum

Chavasse is believed to be commemorated by more war memorials in the UK than any other individual. Sixteen have currently been recorded by the UK National Inventory of War Memorials.

Chavasse's medals, which had been left by his family to St Peter's College, Oxford (which had been founded by his father; his brother Christopher was its first Master), were purchased in 2009 by Lord Ashcroft for around £1.5 million, a world record price. The medals, along with others, are displayed in the Lord Ashcroft Gallery at the Imperial War Museum.

Chavasse Park in Liverpool city centre was named in honour of the Chavasse family; Francis (2nd Bishop of Liverpool) and his twin sons Christopher Maude Chavasse (an Olympic athlete and later Bishop of Rochester), and Noel Godfrey Chavasse.

A hospital ward is named after him at the Walton Centre in Liverpool.

One of the houses at Magdalen College School is named in honour of him.

There are two World War One Victoria Cross paving stones (each depicting a pair of crosses) dedicated to Chavasse in Oxford: one outside St Peter's College and one near Magdalen College School.

A bronze memorial (the 'Liverpool Heroes Memorial') commemorating Chavasse and fifteen other Liverpool-born Victoria Cross recipients has been erected at Abercromby Square in Liverpool. It was sculpted by Tom Murphy.

In 2017, Noel Chavasse was featured on a £5 coin (issued in silver and gold) in a six-coin set commemorating the centenary of the First World War produced by the Royal Mint.

== See also ==
- List of Olympians killed in World War I
