= Towards the Conversion of England =

Towards the Conversion of England: a plan dedicated to the memory of Archbishop William Temple was a 1945 report produced by the Church of England Commission on Evangelism, chaired by the evangelical Bishop of Rochester, Christopher Chavasse. At the time it was widely circulated and influential, though controversial.

The commission had been appointed by the Archbishop of Canterbury William Temple and Archbishop of York Cyril Garbett following a resolution of the summer session of the 1943 General Assembly. The resulting report, forcefully evangelical in conclusion, was described by one leading Anglican as "one of the most remarkable statements ever authorized for publication by the Church of England."

Among the findings of the report were restatements of Reformation teachings such as a judgment day and annihilationism.

The report was the precursor to Evangelicals Affirm 1948, John Stott's Eclectic Society founded in 1955, the lay publication Church of England Newspaper 1959, and the Church of England Evangelical Council (CEEC).
