= Arthur Thomson (physician) =

Professor Sir Arthur Thomson MC FRCP

Personal details
- Born: Arthur Peregrine Thomson; 1890 British Guiana
- Died: 15 July 1977 (aged 86–87)

Sir Arthur Peregrine Thomson (1890 – 15 July 1977) was a British physician.

Born in British Guiana the son of Arthur Henry Thomson, a colonial civil servant, he was educated at Dulwich College and Birmingham University, where he graduated in 1915 with first class honours in medicine, surgery and midwifery. He was also awarded the gold medal in clinical medicine, the Russell Memorial Prize, and was both Queen's and Ingleby Scholar.

After graduation, he joined the Royal Army Medical Corps as a captain and served as a Regimental Medical Officer with the Guards Division in France during World War I, where he was awarded the Military Cross and the Croix de Guerre, and was Mentioned in Despatches twice by the British and once by the French.

After the war he was appointed Assistant Physician at Birmingham General Hospital, where he was elected MRCP in 1920 and obtained his MD in 1923. He worked as a physician all his life specialising in diabetes. At the Birmingham Children's Hospital he took special interest in Rheumatic Fever and the Baskerville School for children with rheumatic heart disease. Later in life he focussed his research activity on to ageing and chronic sickness, giving the Lumleian Lectures on the subject in 1949. He had been elected a Fellow of the Royal College of Physicians in 1930 and gave their Harveian Oration in 1961.

In 1947 Birmingham University appointed him part-time Professor of Therapeutics, after which he became Dean of the Medical Faculty and in 1952 vice-principal of the university. He was knighted in 1959.

He married Minnie Scott Hutchings (née Lindsley) in Birmingham in 1912; they had one adopted daughter.
