= Christopher Chavasse =

British athlete, soldier, and religious leader

The Right Reverend Christopher Maude Chavasse OBE MC TD
- Bishop of Rochester
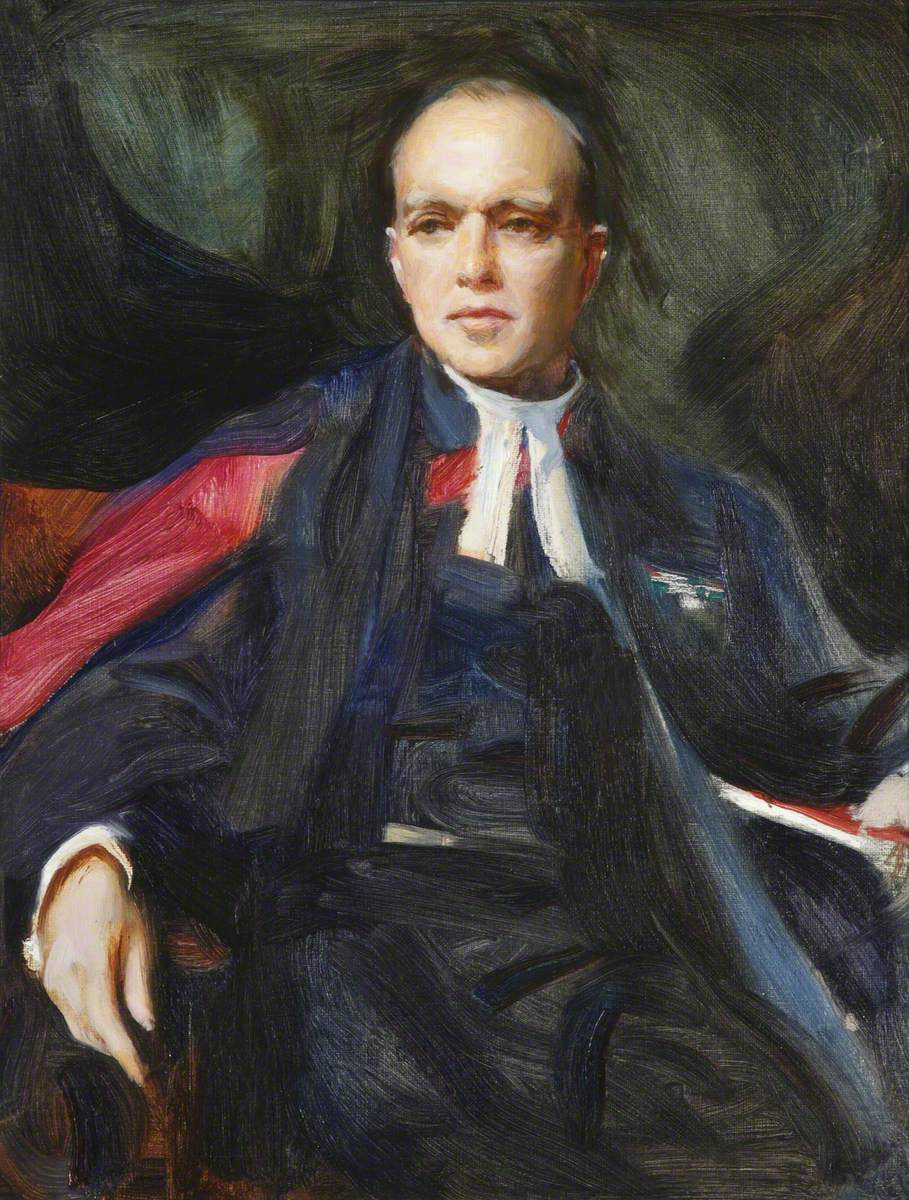
- Portrait, 1937
- Church: Church of England
- Diocese: Diocese of Rochester
- Elected: 19 March 1940
- Term ended: 30 September 1960
- Predecessor: Linton Smith
- Successor: David Say
- Other post: Master of St Peter's Hall, Oxford (1929–1940)

Orders
- Ordination: 1911 (priest) by Francis Chavasse
- Consecration: 25 April 1940

Personal details
- Born: 9 November 1884 Oxford
- Died: 10 March 1962 (aged 77)
- Denomination: Anglican
- Parents: Francis Chavasse and Edith Maude
- Spouse: Beatrice Willink
- Children: Three sons, two daughters
- Profession: Military chaplain; Olympic athlete
- Education: Trinity College, Oxford

Christopher Chavasse
Playing information
- Position: Wing
Club
Years	Team	Pld	T	G	FG	P
1910–1910	St Helens RLFC	6	3	0	0	9

Christopher Maude Chavasse, OBE, MC, TD, ChStJ (9 November 1884 – 10 March 1962) was a British athlete, soldier and religious leader from the Chavasse family. He competed at the 1908 Summer Olympics in London, served in the First World War, and was later the Bishop of Rochester.

== Early life ==
Chavasse was the son of Francis Chavasse, a Bishop of Liverpool and founder of St Peter's College, Oxford, and his wife Edith Maude. His twin brother, Noel Godfrey Chavasse, was awarded the Victoria Cross and bar. Christopher was the elder of the two by 20 minutes. The twins had two other brothers and three sisters.

Christopher and Noel Chavasse both attended Magdalen College School in Oxford (1896–1900) followed by Liverpool College (1900–1904) before progressing to Trinity College, Oxford, competing in rugby, lacrosse, and athletics. They competed on the British team at the 1908 Summer Olympics in London: Christopher came second in his preliminary heat of the 400 metres shortly after Noel came third in his heat of the same event. Neither advanced to the semi-finals. He was also an England lacrosse international.

== Clergy ==
Christopher was ordained a priest on Trinity Sunday 1911 (22 May), by his father the Bishop of Liverpool, at Liverpool Cathedral.

After being ordained, he was appointed to the St Helens Parish Church staff. The former Liverpool RU player played mostly in the 'A' Team as an amateur and made his debut for the St Helens RLFC first team in the 24 points to 2 home victory over Hunslet on the 2 Jan 1910. The "Flying Curate", as he became known, played on the wing and scored three tries in six matches for the Saints.

== Military service ==
During World War I, Chavasse served as a chaplain in the Royal Army Chaplains' Department of the British Army. On 15 August 1916, he was promoted from chaplain to the Forces 4th Class (equivalent to captain) to chaplain to the Forces 3rd Class (equivalent to major). On 30 September 1918, he was promoted to chaplain to the Forces 2nd Class (equivalent to lieutenant colonel).

== Career ==
After the First World War, Chavasse rose through the ranks of the Church of England. He served as rector of St Aldate's, Oxford from 1922 to 1928 and as rector of St Peter-le-Bailey, Oxford from 1927 to 1940. He became the first master of St Peter's Hall, Oxford upon its founding in 1929, continuing the work of his father, who had died in 1928. He was succeeded in 1940 by Julian Thornton-Duesbery.

He was nominated Bishop of Rochester on 19 March 1940, consecrated on 25 April the same year, and served in that position until his resignation on 30 September 1960.

In 1948, a sermon given by Chavasse about Belshazzar's Feast was featured as a religious short film produced by J. Arthur Rank.

In 1943, Chavasse was chairman of the Archbishops' Commission on Evangelism which published the controversial report Towards the Conversion of England. In accordance with his hope for mass evangelisation, in 1955, Chavasse supported the Crusade of Billy Graham at Harringay Arena.

Chavasse gave his views on homosexuality informally to the Wolfenden Committee, disagreeing with the eventual proposal of the committee to allow same-sex relationships to be legal in private and arguing that "homosexual practice is alarmingly catching".

In 1951, Chavasse founded Bennett Memorial Diocesan School in Tunbridge Wells with the school's main benefactress, Lady Elena Bennett. The school was founded on 17 October 1951 and opened to students on 8 January 1953, to 400 students and only 18 teachers. Bennett Memorial is a Church of England school based within the Diocese of Rochester, having been founded while Chavasse served as the Bishop of Rochester. He founded Rochester Theological College in 1959, which was intended for mature students.

Chavasse also served briefly as an original trustee of St Peter's College upon its incorporation in 1961.

== Personal life ==
Chavasse married Beatrice Willink in July 1919, shortly after the First World War. They had three sons: Noel, their eldest son named in honour of his uncle Noel Godfrey Chavasse, who served as an aide to Bernard Montgomery during the war; Michael and John; and two daughters, Anna and Susan.

In 1939, he lost a leg in a boating accident and was fitted with an artificial leg.

== Honours and decorations ==
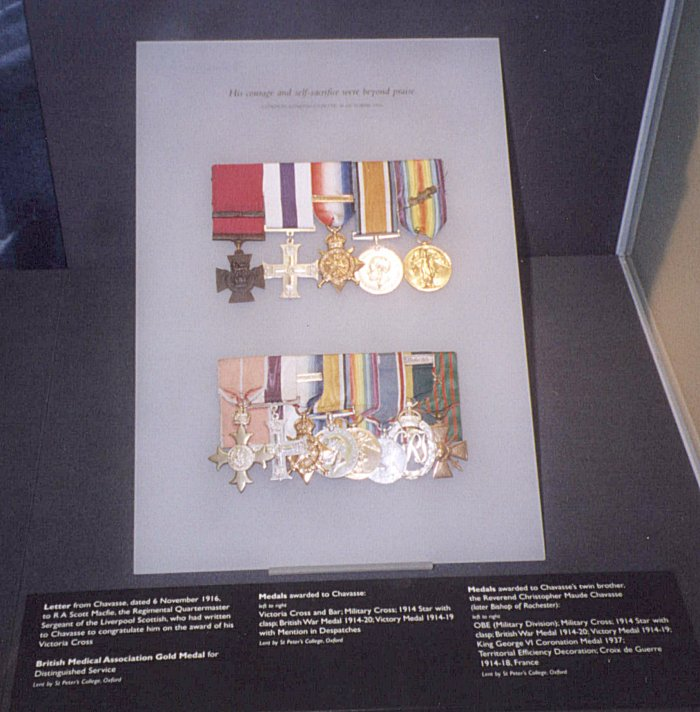
Medals of Noel and Christopher Chavasse. Noel's medals are top row. Christopher's medals are bottom row.

Chavasse was awarded the Military Cross (MC) during World War I. His citation, published in the London Gazette dating 25 August 1917, read:

For conspicuous gallantry and devotion to duty. His fearlessness and untiring efforts in attending to the wounded were magnificent. Although continually under fire, he volunteered on every possible occasion to search for and bring in the wounded. No danger appeared to be too great for him to face, and he inspired others to greater effort by his splendid example.

He was also awarded the Croix de Guerre (1914–1918) by the Republic of France "for distinguished services rendered during the course of the campaign". Chavasse's other World War I medals were the 1914 Star with clasp, the British War Medal, and the Victory Medal.

In the 1936 King's Birthday Honours, he was appointed Officer of the Order of the British Empire (OBE) in its Military Division. In 1937, he was awarded the King George VI Coronation Medal.

On 31 January 1941, he was awarded the Efficiency Decoration (TD) for long service in the Territorial Army. In June 1946, he was appointed chaplain of the Venerable Order of Saint John (CStJ). On 18 March 1959, he was commissioned as a deputy lieutenant (DL) by the Lord Lieutenant of Kent.

== Notes ==
Church of England titles
Preceded by Linton Smith	Bishop of Rochester; 1940–1960	Succeeded by David Say
