= Francis Chavasse =

Anglican bishop

The Right Reverend Francis Chavasse
- Bishop of Liverpool
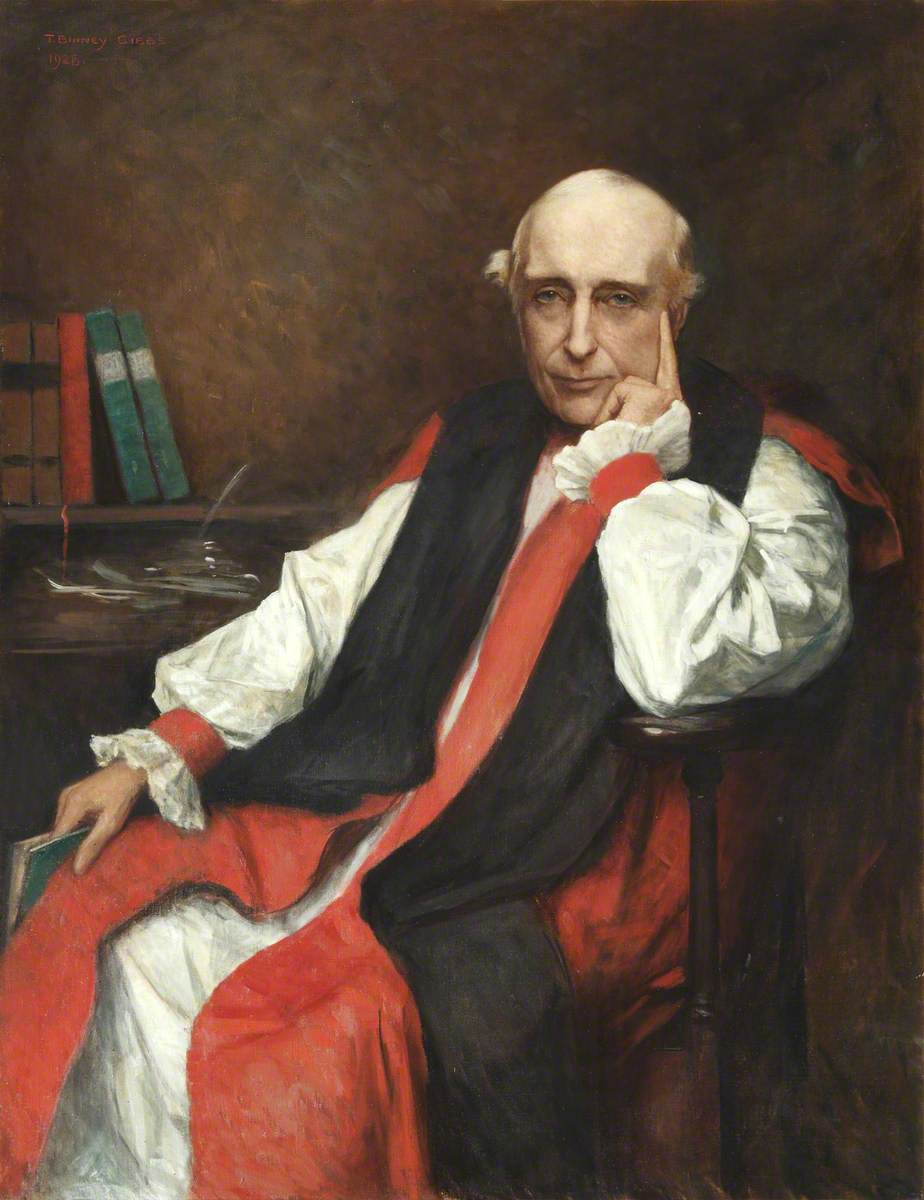
- Diocese: Liverpool
- In office: 1900–1923
- Predecessor: J. C. Ryle
- Successor: Albert David
- Other posts: Principal, Wycliffe Hall, Oxford (1889–1900)

Orders
- Ordination: 1870 (priest)
- Consecration: 1900 by William Maclagan

Personal details
- Born: 27 September 1846 Sutton Coldfield, England, UK
- Died: 11 March 1928 (aged 81) Oxford, England, UK
- Buried: Liverpool Cathedral
- Denomination: Anglican
- Spouse: Edith Maude
- Children: 4 sons, 3 daughters (incl. Christopher Chavasse, Noel Godfrey Chavasse)
- Education: Corpus Christi College, Oxford

Francis James Chavasse (27 September 1846 – 11 March 1928) was an Anglican priest and bishop and father of Captain Noel Chavasse. After serving in parishes in Preston, London, and Oxford, for eleven years from 1889 he was principal of the evangelical theological college Wycliffe Hall, Oxford. In 1900 he was appointed as the second Bishop of Liverpool and held the see from 1900 to 1923, during which time he played a large part in the commissioning and the early phases of construction of Liverpool Cathedral.

A lifelong member of the evangelical wing of the Church of England, Chavasse strove to unite all strands of Anglicanism and was widely accepted by members of the high-church tradition within his diocese.

After retiring as Bishop of Liverpool in 1923, Chavasse returned to Oxford, where he was the guiding spirit of the establishment of a new academic institution admitting undergraduates of modest means. This opened in 1929, a year after his death, as St Peter's Hall, and was later given full collegiate status as St Peter's College.

== Life and career ==
=== Early years ===
Chavasse was born at Sutton Coldfield, to a family of Huguenot origin. He was the eldest son of the surgeon Thomas Chavasse and his second wife, Miriam Sarah née Wyld. His parents intended him to be educated at Chesterfield Grammar School, but he was an unhealthy child; complications after an attack of measles led to curvature of the spine, and he narrowly survived an attack of pneumonia. He was left physically stunted, standing at only five foot three inches tall. Instead of attending the grammar school he was educated privately.

In 1865 Chavasse went up to Corpus Christi College, Oxford. Earlier in the century, there had been a strong evangelical influence at Oxford, but by Chavasse's days as an undergraduate, leading evangelical academics such as Benjamin Symons, John Macbride and Richard Cotton were old men, with few successors. One of the few was the rector of St Aldate's, Canon A M W Christopher (1820–1913), who was a strong influence on Chavasse, encouraging his evangelical views. Chavasse did not shun the friendships of Anglicans of higher church views than his own, but he drew the line at Roman Catholicism. He took a first class degree in the school of Law and Modern History in 1869.

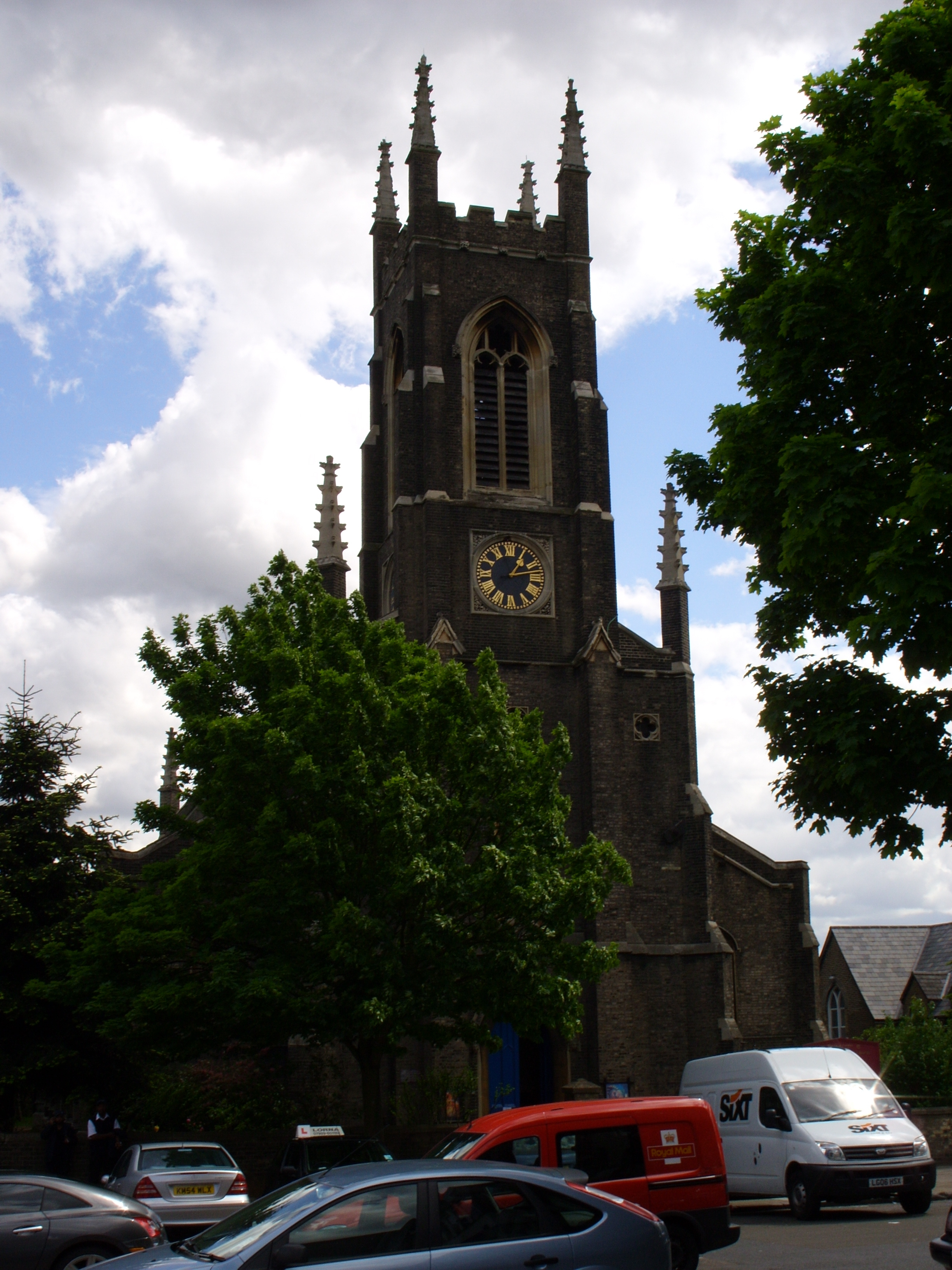
St John's, Holloway

In 1870 Chavasse was ordained priest by James Fraser, Bishop of Manchester, and appointed to the curacy of St Paul's, Preston. He became known there as "the Ministering Angel", for his constant visiting the sick during an epidemic. In 1873 he was appointed vicar of St John's Upper Holloway, then a prosperous suburb of London, where he served for five years.

=== Oxford ===
In 1878 Chavasse moved back to Oxford as rector of St Peter-le-Bailey. This church was one of two in Oxford recognised as centres of the evangelical wing of the church, in a city generally dominated by high-church Anglicanism. Chavasse was not invited for many years to preach before the university, but in the words of The Times, "He had a genius for pastoral work, and his parish became an important centre for those who preferred the simpler services and the more individual teaching of Evangelical Churchmanship."

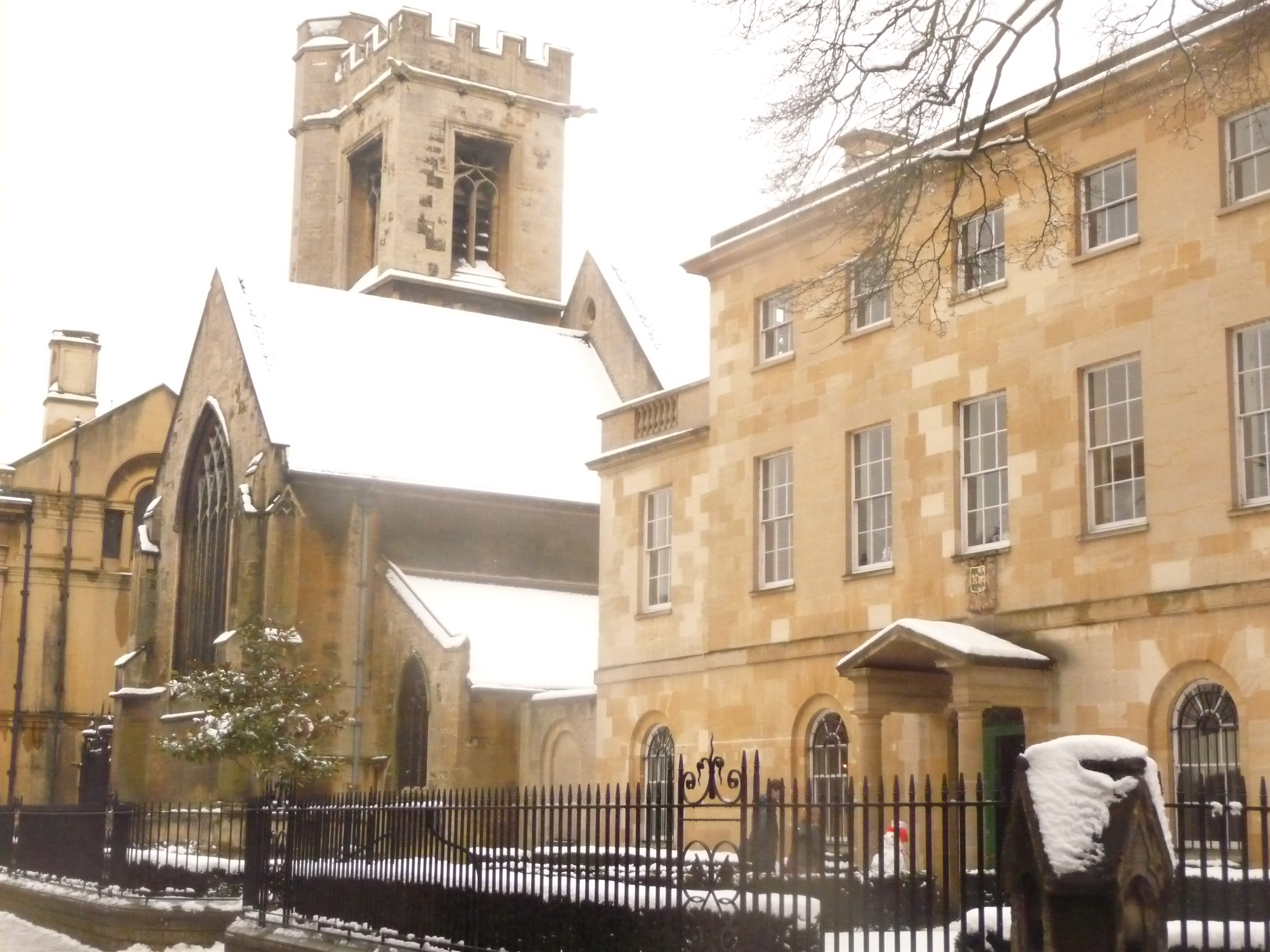
St Peter-le-Bailey

In 1881 Chavasse married Edith Maude, younger daughter of Canon Joseph Maude, vicar of Chirk, Denbighshire. They had seven children: four sons and three daughters.

Chavasse was considered a capable but not an outstanding scholar and theologian; he nevertheless achieved considerable success with his Sunday evening Greek Testament classes for undergraduates. When the principalship of the evangelically inclined theological college Wycliffe Hall, Oxford fell vacant in 1889, he was invited to take the post. The outgoing principal, Robert Baker Girdlestone, was known for his great scholarship, but under Chavasse the college suffered no diminution in its prestige. When Chavasse took over from Girdlestone the college was struggling to survive; it was primarily due to Chavasse's personal popularity and pastoral skills that Wycliffe Hall not only survived but flourished. Though himself a lifelong evangelical, he was sympathetic to churchmen of other views, to the extent that some of the trustees of the college found him more liberal than they were wholly comfortable with. Students at Wycliffe Hall under Chavasse "stood for bright and reverent services, for diligent visitation, and for keen interest in voluntary schools."

=== Liverpool ===
In late 1899, the octogenarian Bishop of Liverpool, J C Ryle, gave the Archbishop of York notice that he intended to retire on 1 March 1900. At that time, the appointment of Anglican bishops was decided by the British prime minister, who in 1899 was Lord Salisbury. He caused some surprise by offering the bishopric of Liverpool to Chavasse; the diocese was predominantly evangelical, but other eminent clerics from that wing of the church, such as Handley Moule, were better known. Chavasse, however, had gained the trust and affection of all wings of the church while in Oxford, and his appointment at Liverpool was widely welcomed. The Manchester Guardian commented "Whereas Dr. Ryle's Low Churchmanship, though mellowed by the years, was still combative, Dr. Chavasse was the least pugnacious of partisans. Liverpool welcomed him with acclamation and remained enthusiastically loyal to him."

One of the few people uncertain about the appointment was Chavasse himself. While pondering Salisbury's offer, he had written to a friend, "A man with my feeble body, average ability and temperament can hardly be intended by God for such a diocese. God is blessing Wycliffe, and ought I to leave it at present? Can I not do more good by training bishops than becoming one?" He finally accepted the post, was formally appointed on 24 March 1900, and was consecrated bishop at York Minster on 25 April 1900. He was enthroned as Bishop of Liverpool on 31 May 1900. As a bishop designate, he received the degree Doctor of Divinity (DD) from the University of Oxford in March 1900.

Giles Gilbert Scott's original design for Liverpool Cathedral

Liverpool lacked a cathedral. The diocese, founded in 1880, had a "pro-cathedral" in the form of the parish church of St Peter's, Church Street. It was unsatisfactory, being too small for major church events, and, in the words of the rector of Liverpool, "ugly & hideous". In 1885 there had been a proposal to construct a purpose-built cathedral worthy of the city, but the chosen site turned out to be unsuitable. Ryle, believing that the considerable expense could be better used elsewhere, supported the project only half-heartedly and it was shelved.

From the outset of his bishopric, Chavasse was determined to revive the project. There was some opposition among those rigorously evangelical members of his diocesan clergy who had earlier agreed with Ryle that there was no need for an expensive new cathedral. Chavasse did not regard evangelism as incompatible with the building of a great church as "a visible witness to God in the midst of a great city". He pressed ahead, and appointed a committee under Sir William Forwood to consider all possible sites. Within a year a site had been chosen, and a public meeting chaired by Lord Derby officially launched the scheme. Chavasse made a powerful and effective speech, encouraging the citizens of Liverpool, "We must build for posterity, we must take a leaf out of the book of our noble forefathers, who have handed down to us those great Cathedrals which are among the greatest heritages of the English nation". The proposal to build a cathedral was carried by acclamation. The young architect Giles Gilbert Scott was chosen to design the building. Work began in 1904, starting with the Lady Chapel, before building began on the huge main body of the cathedral.

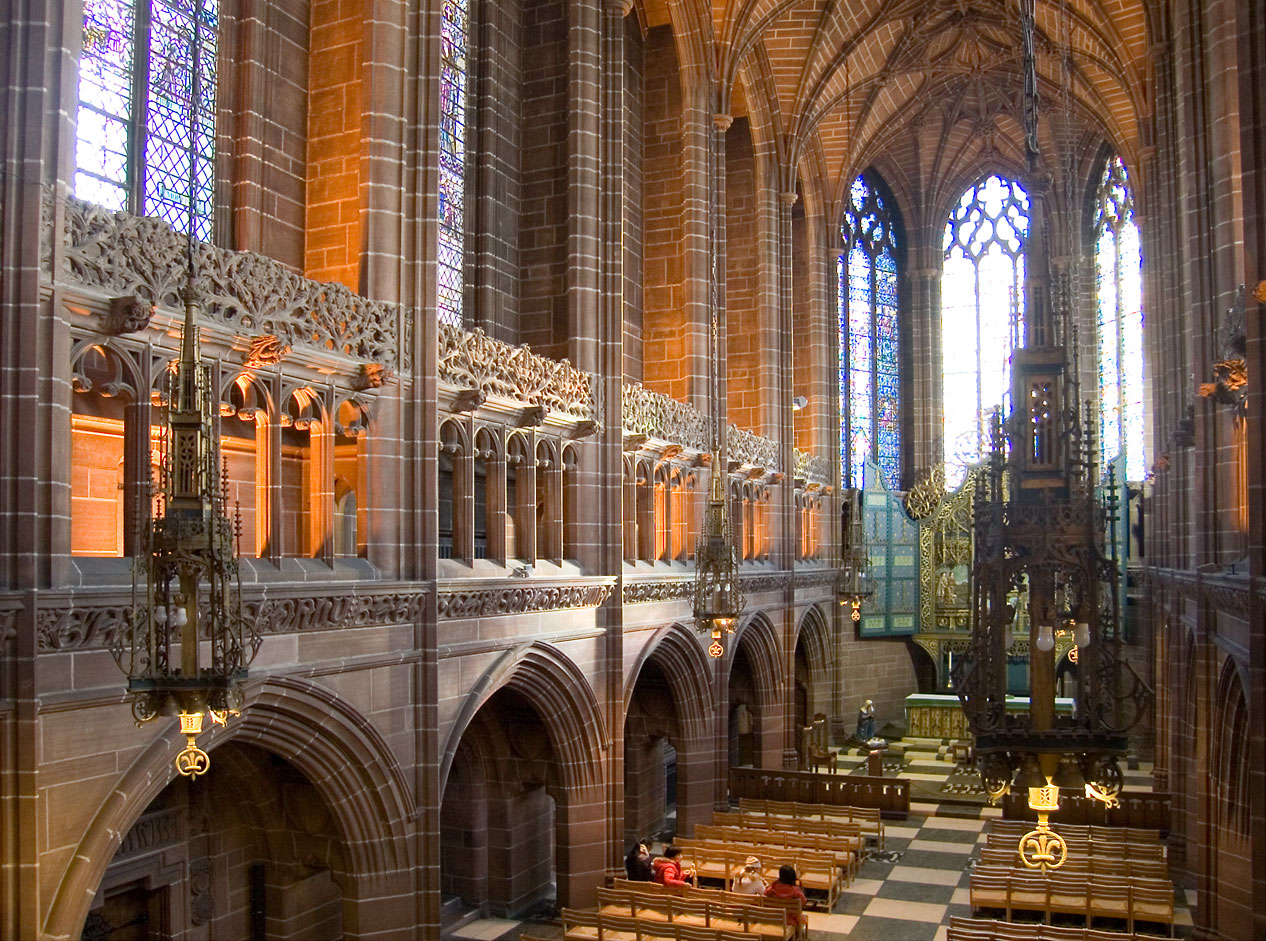
The Lady Chapel of Liverpool Cathedral

In 1910 the Lady Chapel of the new cathedral was opened for regular service. The outbreak of the First World War caused grave setbacks for Chavasse. Work on the building slowed down drastically with the diversion of men and materials for the war effort, and Chavasse and his wife lost two of their four sons, killed in action in 1917.

Chavasse had recognised from the outset that the cathedral would take several generations to build. When construction resumed after the war, with the choir and transepts nearing completion, he decided that the consecration of the main body of the cathedral should not be the crowning glory of his episcopate, but should be the early landmark of a younger successor. He resigned in 1923, retiring to Oxford.

=== Factionalism ===
Religious factionalism was rife in Liverpool when Chavasse succeeded Ryle. There was little contact or sympathy between Anglicans, Roman Catholics, and nonconformists, and even within the Church of England there were entrenched and opposing factions. Although the evangelicals were in a large majority in Liverpool, there was a small but determined high-church, Anglo-Catholic faction, with whom Chavasse had to deal. As far as possible he reached accommodation with them. The Manchester Guardian reported one leading Ritualist as saying, "You cannot quarrel with the Bishop: he loves too much". In those few cases where the more extreme Anglo-Catholics defied church rulings on such matters as the use of incense, Chavasse, said The Times, "manfully stood his ground, speaking his mind as freely about them as he did about the fanatical Orange orators at the other end of the scale." The paper also remarked on "his singular power of bringing together people of all creeds and conditions." However, he was not comfortable with spiritualism and ultimately had one of his clergy, George Vale Owen, who had become an enthusiastic convert, removed from his parish in Orford, Warrington.

=== St Peter's Hall ===
On his return to Oxford in 1923, Chavasse was elected an honorary fellow of Corpus Christi. and moved back into the vacant rectory of St Peter-le-Bailey. Wishing to benefit young men of modest means and evangelical outlook, he worked to use the buildings of St Peter-le Bailey to set up a new academic institution within the university. His efforts came to fruition after his death: in 1929 the university recognised St Peter's Hall (later St Peter's College) as a permanent private hall within the university. The first master of the hall was Chavasse's eldest son, Christopher.

Chavasse died in Oxford at the age of 81. He was buried in the precinct of Liverpool Cathedral, and a memorial to him was placed in the south choir aisle, behind the bishop's throne.

=== Family and the Great War ===
The commitment to the Great War of Chavasse's family reflects his own strong support for the War illustrated by his writings in the monthly Diocesan Gazette. He did not mince his words. He was among the most articulate of bishops, and was clear that the War would be "more terrible in its character, and more far-reaching in its results than any war in modern times." Nevertheless, he used his influence to call his diocese to action. "Our duty is clear. As citizens of a great Empire we are to seek to help our country by every means in our power. The young and the strong can be ready to shoulder the rifle or to draw the sword in defence of our Fatherland, and for the cause of liberty, and peace, and righteousness ...". He called on his clergy to organise meetings to explain the causes of the War. "We are fighting on the side of God for a cause which He has at heart." "The English clergy and laity must make supreme efforts not only to deepen the spirit of patriotism amongst our people and to encourage recruiting but to witness and work for Christ". Despite losing family, friends and colleagues during the War, Chavasse continued to preach and to be active in support of the War. He was proud of the sacrifice made not just by his family but also by his clergy who had become chaplains, had joined the Church Army and YMCA and were helping in schools, in agriculture and, in one case, chemical research.

All four of Chavasse's sons served with distinction in the First World War. The eldest, Christopher Chavasse, won the Military Cross and the Croix de Guerre. He later became rector of St Aldate's, Oxford and subsequently Bishop of Rochester. His twin brother, Noel, a surgeon, who won the Military Cross and the only double Victoria Cross awarded throughout the war, was killed in action in 1917. The third son, Francis Bernard, won the Military Cross and later became a leading ophthalmic surgeon. The youngest, Aidan, was killed in action in 1917. Chavasse's wife died in 1927. In 1986, the Chavasses' twin daughters May and Marjorie entered the British record books, celebrating their 100th birthdays. May Chavasse died before her 101st birthday but Marjorie lived to the age of 103.

== Sources ==
- Bailey, F A; Millington, R (1957). The Story of Liverpool. Liverpool: Corporation of the City of Liverpool. OCLC 19865965.
- Cotton, Vere E (1964). The Book of Liverpool Cathedral. Liverpool: Liverpool University Press. OCLC 2286856.
- Hesilrige, Arthur G. M. (1921). Debrett's Peerage and Titles of courtesy. 160A, Fleet street, London, UK: Dean & Son. p. 575.
- Kennerley, Peter (1991). The Building of Liverpool Cathedral. Preston, Lancashire: Carnegie Publishing. ISBN 0-948789-72-7.
- Smith, Mark; Taylor, Stephen (2004). Evangelicalism in the Church of England c.1790-c.1890. Woodbridge: Boydell. ISBN 1-84383-105-8.

Church of England titles
| Preceded by J. C. Ryle | Bishop of Liverpool; 1900–1923 | Succeeded by Albert David |
