= Film adaptations of The Tempest =

Screenings of the play by William Shakespeare

William Shakespeare's play The Tempest has been screened many times, starting in the silent era. Many of these productions have been adaptations of various kinds, rather than performances of Shakespeare's script.

The Tempest (1908)

== Silent Era ==
The Tempest first appeared on the screen in 1905. Charles Urban filmed the opening storm sequence of Herbert Beerbohm Tree's version at Her Majesty's Theatre for a 2 1/2-minute flicker, whose individual frames were hand-tinted, long before the invention of colour film. In 1908 Percy Stow directed The Tempest running a little over ten minutes, which is now a part of the British Film Institute's compilation Silent Shakespeare. It portrays a condensed version of Shakespeare's play in a series of short scenes linked by intertitles. At least two other silent versions, one from 1911 by Edwin Thanhouser, are known to have existed, but have been lost.

== Film Versions ==
The plot was adapted for the Western Yellow Sky, directed by William A. Wellman, in 1946.

The 1956 science fiction film Forbidden Planet set the story on a planet in space, Altair IV, instead of an island. Professor Morbius (Walter Pidgeon) and his daughter Altaira (Anne Francis) are the Prospero and Miranda figures, whose lives are disrupted by the arrival of a spaceship from Earth. Ariel is represented by the helpful Robby the Robot. Caliban is represented by the dangerous and invisible "monster from the id", a technologically-enhanced projection of Morbius' psyche.

Writing in 2000, Douglas Brode expressed the opinion that there had only been one screen "performance" of The Tempest since the silent era: he describes all other versions as "variations". That one performance is the Hallmark Hall of Fame version from 1960, directed by George Schaefer, and starring Maurice Evans as Prospero, Richard Burton as Caliban, Lee Remick as Miranda, and Roddy McDowall as Ariel. It cut the play to slightly less than ninety minutes. Critic Virginia Vaughan praised it as "light as a soufflé, but ... substantial enough for the main course".

A 1969 episode of the television series Star Trek, "Requiem for Methuselah", again set the story in space on the apparently deserted planet Holberg 917-G. The Prospero figure is Flint (James Daly), an immortal man who has isolated himself from humanity and controls advanced technology that borders on magic. Flint's young ward Rayna Kapec (Louise Sorel) fills the Miranda role, and Flint's versatile robotic servant M4 parallels Ariel.

In 1979, Derek Jarman produced the homoerotic film The Tempest that used Shakespeare's language, but was most notable for its deviations from Shakespeare. One scene shows a corpulent and naked Sycorax (Claire Davenport) breastfeeding her adult son Caliban (Jack Birkett). The film reaches its climax with Elisabeth Welch belting out "Stormy Weather". The central performances were Toyah Willcox's Miranda and Heathcote Williams's Prospero, a "dark brooding figure who takes pleasure in exploiting both his servants".

Several television versions of the play have been broadcast. Among them the 1980 BBC Shakespeare production starring Michael Hordern as Prospero and the 1983 "Shakespeare Collection" series, starring Efrem Zimbalist, Jr. as Prospero.

Paul Mazursky's 1982 modern-language adaptation Tempest, with Philip Dimitrius (Prospero) as a disillusioned New York architect who retreats to a lonely Greek island with his daughter Miranda after learning of his wife Antonia's infidelity with Alonzo, dealt frankly with the sexual tensions of the characters' isolated existence. The Caliban character, the goatherd Kalibanos, asks Philip which of them is going to have sex with Miranda. John Cassavetes played Philip, Raul Julia Kalibanos, Gena Rowlands Antonia and Molly Ringwald Miranda. Susan Sarandon plays the Ariel character, Philip's frequently bored girlfriend Aretha. The film has been criticised as "overlong and rambling", but also praised for its good humour, especially in a sequence in which Kalibanos' and his goats dance to Kander and Ebb's New York, New York.

John Gielgud wrote that playing Prospero in a film of The Tempest was his life's ambition. Over the years, he approached Alain Resnais, Ingmar Bergman, Akira Kurosawa, and Orson Welles to direct. Eventually, the project was taken on by Peter Greenaway, who directed Prospero's Books (1991) featuring "an 87-year-old John Gielgud and an impressive amount of nudity". Prospero is reimagined as the author of The Tempest, speaking the lines of the other characters, as well as his own. Although the film was acknowledged as innovative in its use of Quantel Paintbox to create visual tableaux, resulting in "unprecedented visual complexity", critical responses to the film were frequently negative: John Simon called it "contemptible and pretentious".

Closer to the spirit of Shakespeare's original, in the view of critics such as Brode, is Leon Garfield's abridgement of the play for S4C's 1992 Shakespeare: The Animated Tales series. The 29-minute production, directed by Stanislav Sokolov and featuring Timothy West as the voice of Prospero, used stop-motion puppets to capture the fairy-tale quality of the play.

Another "offbeat variation" (in Brode's words) was produced for NBC in 1998: Jack Bender's The Tempest featured Peter Fonda as Gideon Prosper, a Southern slave-owner forced off his plantation by his brother shortly before the Civil War. A magician who has learned his art from one of his slaves, Prosper uses his magic to protect his teenage daughter and to assist the Union Army.

== 21st Century ==
Director Julie Taymor's 2010 adaptation The Tempest starred Helen Mirren as Prospera, a female Prospero character: with the text adapted to establish a different backstory between Prospera and Antonio. The film was praised for its powerful visual imagery used in place of Shakespearean language.

In 2012, the year that the UK hosted a 'Tempest' themed Olympics opening ceremony, directors Rob Curry and Anthony Fletcher released a theatrical documentary following a South London youth club as they staged a production of the play at the Oval House Theatre in Kennington. The adaptation focused heavily on the post-colonial legacy of the play, featuring as it did a racially mixed cast of young Londoners.

Although comparisons have been made between The Tempest and the 2015 science fiction film Ex Machina, namely that Prospero was reinterpreted as Nathan, the genius tech developer; Miranda as Ava, the artificially-intelligent android and Ferdinand as Caleb, the manipulated visitor, writer-director Alex Garland denies the connection.

In 2020, a parody shock film based on The Tempest was released by Troma Entertainment titled "Shakespear's Shitstorm", starring director Lloyd Kaufman and guest starring Ron Jeremy. The film features ridiculous interpretations of many key parts of Shakespear's work. In this film Prospero is a mad scientist seeking revenge against pharmaceutical executives who ruined his career after he found the cure for opioid addiction. Prospero releases a large amount of whale laxative into the ocean during the executives' cruise to North Korea, resulting in whales leaping over the ship spraying feces all over the passengers, ultimately causing them to wash ashore at Tromaville where he begins to plot the murder of the executive that ruined him. As with all Troma films it contains generous amounts of nudity and pays no mind to censorship.

The 2022 Japanese anime television series Mobile Suit Gundam: The Witch from Mercury is heavily influenced by the play and functions as a modern adaptation of it in many respects, including but not limited to; a female interpretation of Prospero named Lady Prospera, her infant daughter Ericht whose spirit becomes infused in the titular gundam Aerial (an interpretation of Prospero's fairy Ariel), a "monstrous" mobile suit used by the protagonist Suletta Mercury named Gundam Calibarn (named after the slave Caliban and the holy sword Caliburn) and the story's prologue depicting an assassination attempt that leaves Prospera and her infant daughter as the only survivors, leading to their refuge on the remote planet of Mercury. The series also follows a similar narrative arc as the play does, incorporating several key plot points; most notably Lady Prospera arranging for her daughter's betrothal to the heiress of the Benerit Group, the Megacorporation responsible for her misfortune. The series also ends with Lady Prospera abandoning her plans for revenge, and the eventual marriage of her daughter to the Benerit heir.

== Citations ==
=== References ===
References to The Tempest are to the Arden Third Series Edition (i.e. Vaughan and Vaughan 1999). Under its numbering system 4.1.148 means act 4, scene 1, line 148; and 5.E.20 means the epilogue following act 5, line 20.

=== Bibliography ===
- Brode, Douglas (2001). Shakespeare in the Movies: From the Silent Era to Today. New York: Berkley Boulevard Books. ISBN 0-425-18176-6. OCLC 46822465.
- Forsyth, Neil. "Shakespeare the Illusionist: Filming the Supernatural". In Jackson (2000), pp. 274–294.
- Howard, Tony. "Shakespeare's Cinematic Offshoots". In Jackson (2000).
- Howard, Tony. "Shakespeare on Film and Video". In Wells & Orlin (2003), pp. 607–619.
- Jackson, Russell, ed. (2000). The Cambridge Companion to Shakespeare on Film. Cambridge: Cambridge University Press. ISBN 0-521-63975-1. OCLC 935575429 – via Internet Archive.
- Jordison, Sam (24 April 2014). "The Tempest Casts Strange Spells at the Cinema". The Guardian. Archived from the original on 23 March 2025.
- Morse, Ruth (2000). "Monsters, Magicians, Movies: The Tempest and the Final Frontier". Shakespeare Survey. 53, Shakespeare and Narrative. Cambridge University Press: 164–174. doi:10.1017/CCOL0521781140.014. ISBN 978-1-139-05274-0. ISSN 0080-9152 – via Cambridge Core.
- Pilkington, Ace G. (2015). "Forbidden Planet: Aliens, Monsters and Fictions of Nuclear Disaster". In Kapell, Matthew Wilhelm; Pilkington, Ace G. (eds.). The Fantastic Made Visible: Essays on the Adaptation of Science Fiction and Fantasy from Page to Screen. McFarland & Company. pp. 43–59. ISBN 978-0-7864-9619-8. OCLC 907942426.
- Rozakis, Laurie (1999). The Complete Idiot's Guide to Shakespeare. New York: Alpha Books. ISBN 0-02-862905-1. OCLC 41382482.
- Vaughan, Virginia Mason; Vaughan, Alden T. (1999). The Tempest. The Arden Shakespeare, Third Series. The Arden Shakespeare. ISBN 978-1-903436-08-0. OCLC 1424207290.
- Vaughan, Virginia Mason; Vaughan, Alden T. (2011). The Tempest: Revised Edition. The Arden Shakespeare, Third Series. The Arden Shakespeare. ISBN 978-1-4081-3347-7. OCLC 761369508.
- Wells, Stanley; Orlin, Lena Cowen, eds. (2003). Shakespeare: An Oxford Guide. Oxford: Oxford University Press. ISBN 0-19-924522-3. OCLC 50920674.
