= Willie and Tim in the Motor Car =

1905 short film by Percy Stow

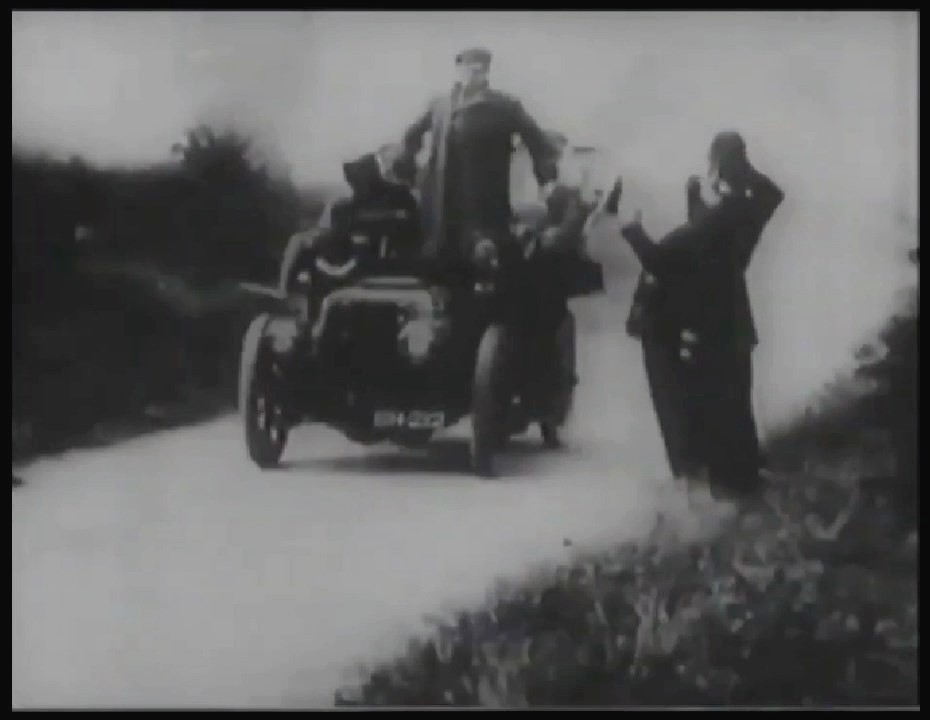
- Directed by: Percy Stow
- Release date: 1905
- Running time: 9 minutes
- Country: United Kingdom
- Languages: Silent film English inter-titles

Willie and Tim in the Motor Car, also known as Fine Feathers Make Fine Birds, is a 1905 British short silent comedy film directed by Percy Stow and produced by the Clarendon Film Company. The film seems to be the oldest one featuring a chase between a motorcycle and a motor car.

== Plot ==
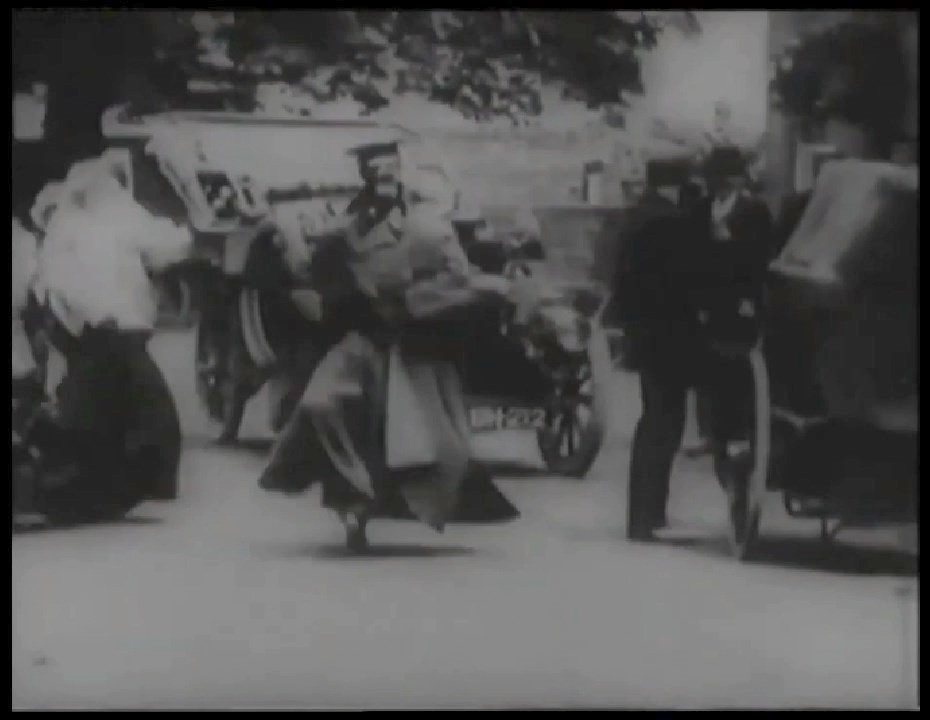
Screenshot

A large touring car of British manufacture arrives at the front gate of a country estate. The passengers remove their outer travelling garments, hand them to the chauffeur and enter the gate. Shortly afterwards, the maid calls the chauffeur away. Four itinerants come along, take command of the clothing and the car, and drive away. The chauffeur returns, finds the car gone, and chases them on a motorcycle. For the remainder of the film, the automobile is pursued by the chauffeur. The chase ends when the car goes into a small lake, and the occupants are apprehended by the police.

== Analysis ==
The film is composed of 7 shots, all of them filmed on location, without intertitles:

1. A country lane. A car enters from left and stops in front of a gate. The passengers alight and give their travel coats to the chauffeur who puts them in the car. A chambermaid comes out of the gate and the chauffeur follows her, leaving the car unattended. Two men and two women enter from the right. They put on the coats left in the car and drive away. The driver comes running out of the gate. He finds a motorbike and start chasing them.

2. A street. The car enters from left and stops in front of a pub. The driver places an order with a waiter. As the waiter comes back and gives the passengers their drinks, the chauffeur arrives on his motorbike. He starts fighting with the driver and the camera pans left as they cross the street fighting. The driver knocks out the chauffeur unconscious, rushes back to the car and drives away.

3. A country road with a policeman standing in the middle. He goes to hide on the side of the road and when the car arrives, several policemen come out of their hiding places and stop the car. The man sitting next to the driver stands up, takes a card from the pocket of the coat he's wearing and shows it to the policeman who salutes and let the car go through. Soon after, the chauffeur arrives on his motorbike. The policemen stop him and, after explanations, one of the policemen rides away on the motorbike.

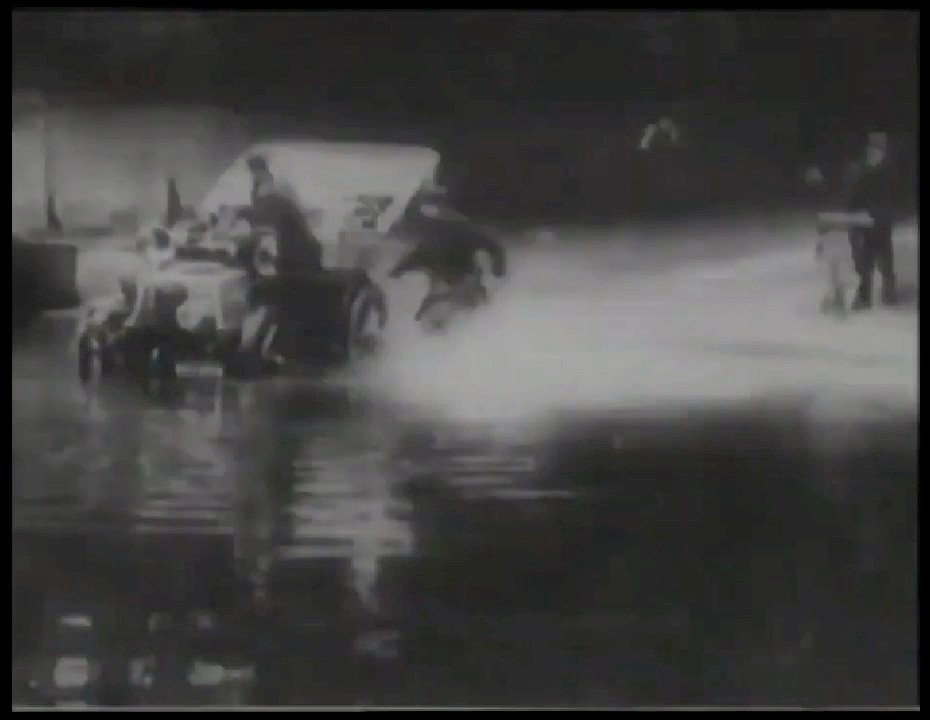
Screenshot

4. The car enters from the left and the camera pans to follow it until it stops on a village square where a man is playing a barrel organ. The passengers alight and they dance on the sound of the music before getting back in the car and driving away in a hurry. 5. Same shot as 5. The camera pans to follows the motorbike which drives on.

6. A country road. The car, now closely followed by the motorbike drives past the camera.

7. The car arrives at a ford and stops in the middle of it. The chauffeur chases one the thieves in the water and catches him while the others manage to get away.

== Distribution and preservation ==
The film was released in the United Kingdom in July 1905 and in the United States, under the title Fine Feathers Make Fine Birds, in August of the same year. It was distributed in the United Kingdom by Gaumont British Distributors and in the United States by the American Mutoscope & Biograph.

The film was preserved, for copyright purposes, as paper print in the collections of the Library of Congress.
