= Rescued in Mid-Air =

1906 short film by Percy Stow

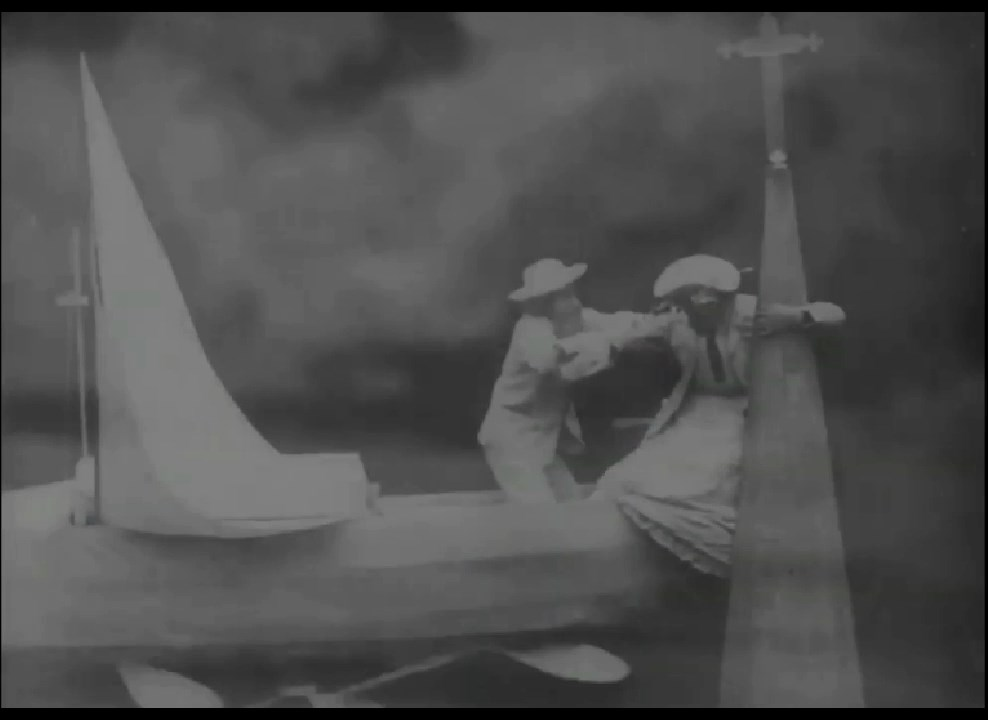
- Directed by: Percy Stow
- Release date: 1906
- Running time: 6 minutes
- Country: United Kingdom
- Language: Silent film

Rescued in Mid-Air is a 1906 British short silent drama film directed by Percy Stow and produced by the Clarendon Film Company. The film seems to be the oldest one featuring an airborne rescue operation.

== Plot ==
A young woman is hurled into the sky when her bicycle is hit by another cyclist. She floats for a moment suspended from her umbrella before clinging to a steeple, from which she is rescued by a crazy-looking scientist in his flying machine which eventually crashes.

== Production and distribution ==
The film was directed by Percy Stow for the Clarendon Film Company that he had co-founded in 1904 with Henry Vassal. It was mostly filmed on location in Croydon. The film was distributed in the United Kingdom by Gaumont British Distributors and was a public success.

== Analysis ==
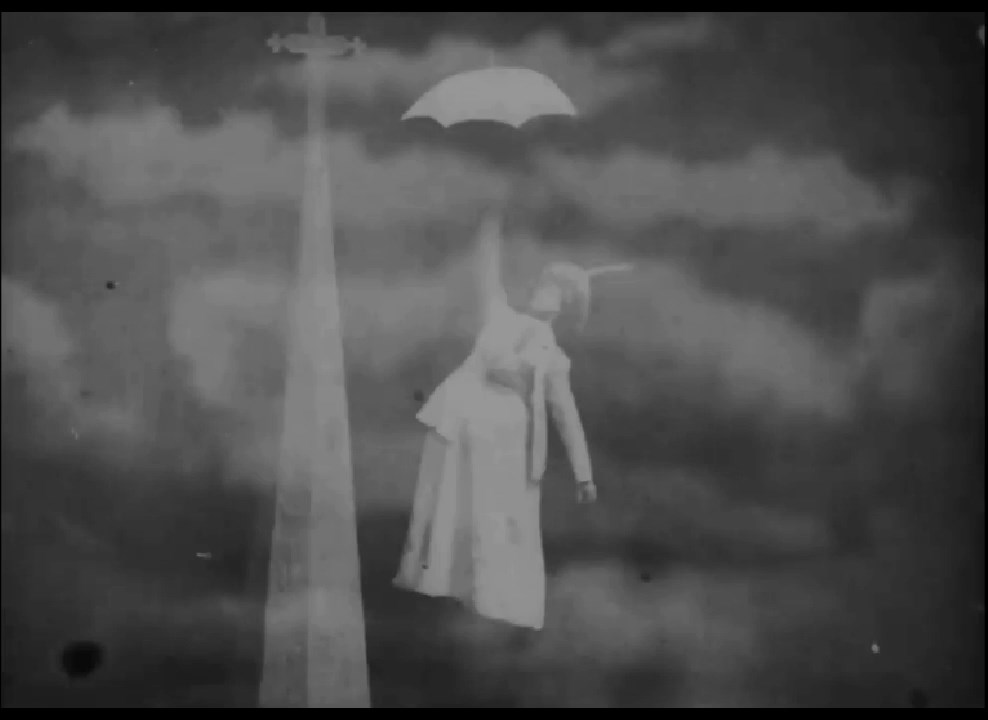
Shot 3

The film is composed of 25 shots, without intertitles:

1. A country road. A man helps a young woman climb into his bicycle's trailer, not noticing another bicycle arriving at great speed and hitting them. The view is obscured by dust.

2. A swirling view gradually slows down to reveal a view of the woman hanging from her umbrella floating in front of a background of moving clouds.

3. Similar shot with a steeple in the foreground.

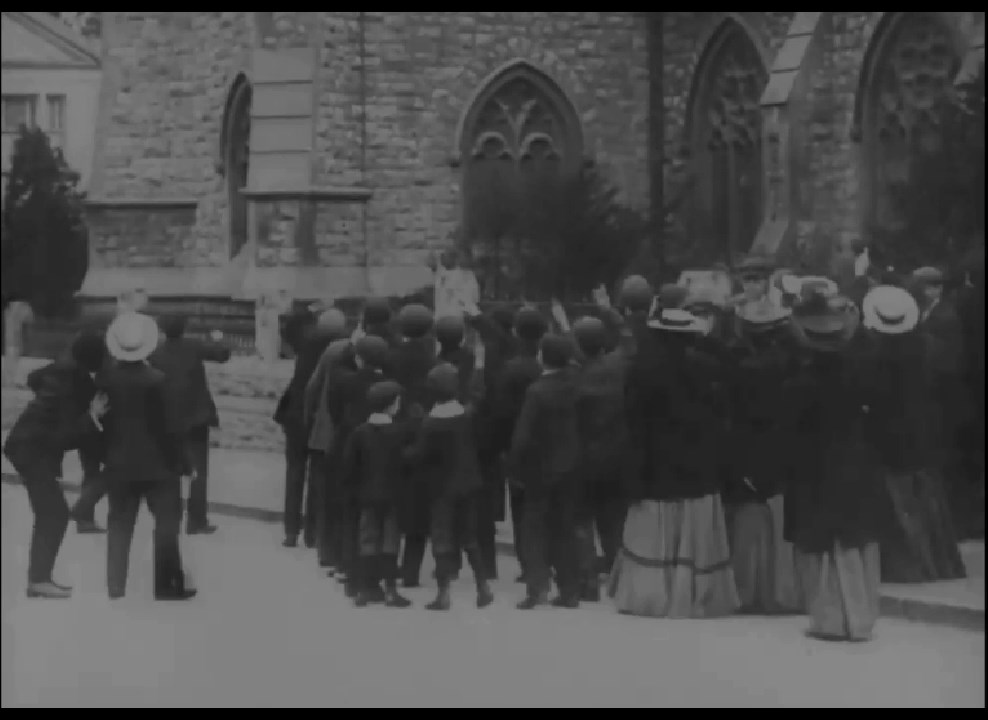
Shot 5

4. Same view of the steeple. The woman floats towards the steeple and grabs it.

5. A street in front of a church. A crowd comes running in, looking up and pointing at the sky.

6. Continuation of 4. The woman is looking down and waves.

7. Continuation of 5. A group of men leave to the right.

8. The facade of a large house. The men enter from left and go to the door. A bearded man dressed in white comes out and the men point towards the sky. He takes his hat and they all leave left.

9. A garage door. The bearded man enters right followed by other men. They open the door and take out a white machine which looks like a boat wrapped in a white sheet with propellers underneath and wings on the side.

10. A field. A man enters right and sets trestles on the grass. The other men settle the machine on them. The bearded man comes on board, cranks the engine on, holds a lever in one hand and the tiller in the other and the machine lifts off.

11. A meadow with trees in the background. A crowd is cheering and waving, looking upwards.

12. Double exposure. The bottom of the screen shows rooftops while the top shows the flying machine, its wing flapping, superimposed on a background of clouds, moving towards the viewer.

13. A street lined with houses. The crowd seen on 11 enters right running away from the camera, waving and looking upwards.

14. Similar to 12.

15. The top of a house against a backdrop of clouds. The flying machine is first coming towards the camera, then veers right towards the house.

16. A room under the roof. A hole breaks open in the roof and the bearded man climbs down a rope through the hole before climbing back up.

17. The steeple seen in 4. The woman is still clutching to the steeple as the flying machine moves towards it. The pilot veers right to allow the woman to come on board. They look downwards and the pilot waves his hat.

18. Continuation of 7.

19. Continuation of 17. The flying machine exits left.

20. A meadow with trees in the background. A crowd is cheering and waving, looking upwards.

21. The flying machine seen sideways against a background of clouds. The man and woman are looking downwards and waving.

22. Continuation of 20.

23. Continuation of 21.

24. A field. The flying machine has crashed on the ground and the two passengers climb out of the wreck unhurt. A crowd runs towards them, cheering. They all exit left.

25. A country road. The cyclist seen in 1 pushes his bicycle towards the camera in the company of another man. As they reach a crossing, the woman and the pilot come in from the right. The cyclist hugs the woman and shakes hand with the pilot.

The film has been quoted by several authors as one of the first examples of cross-cutting. Thomas Elssaer and Adam Barker have noted in particular that "the practice of cutting away for one shot from the enclosing scene was quite established by (then) but the idea of doing this repeatedly was not. (Here) the shots alternate repeatedly between aerial events and happenings on the ground."

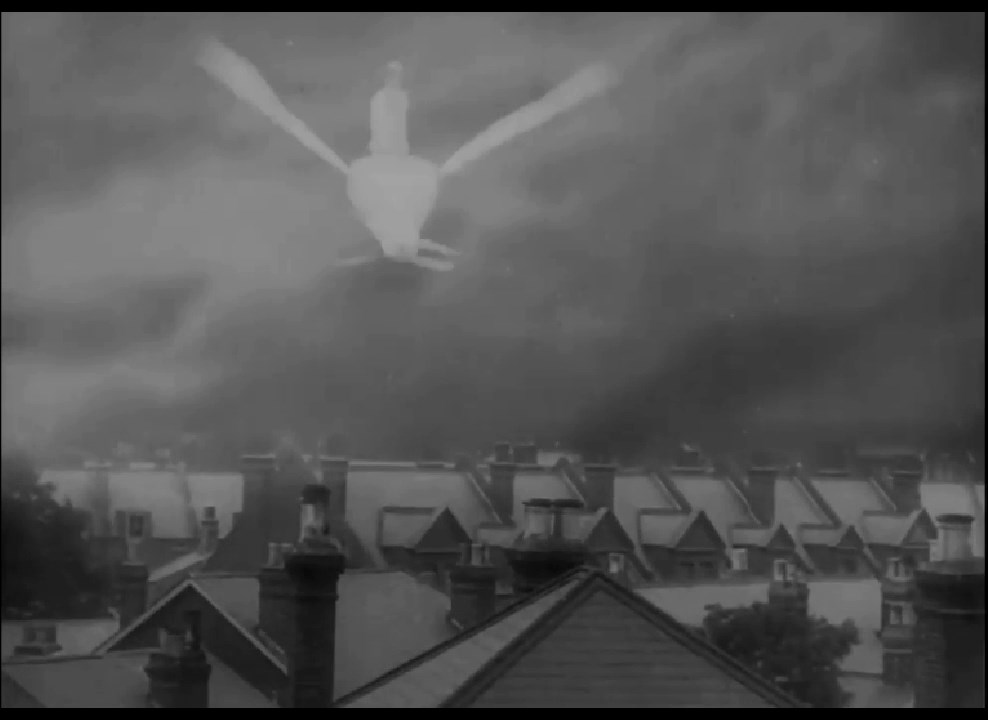
Shot 3

The film has also been quoted as an early example of British science fiction or as "the first realistic use of aviation in film. Leonardo Quaresima and Laura Vichi have however mentioned an earlier film about aviation, Drama in the Air, directed by Gaston Velle in 1904.

The illusion of the flying machine is obtained by combining double exposure, with the upper half masked off while the lower was exposed, and vice versa, and superimposition, with a white coloured flying machine and pilot used to minimize background print-through.
