= Lieutenant Rose films =

British Short Film Series

Lieutenant Rose was a British short film series directed by Percy Stow and produced by the Clarendon Film Company.

== Films ==
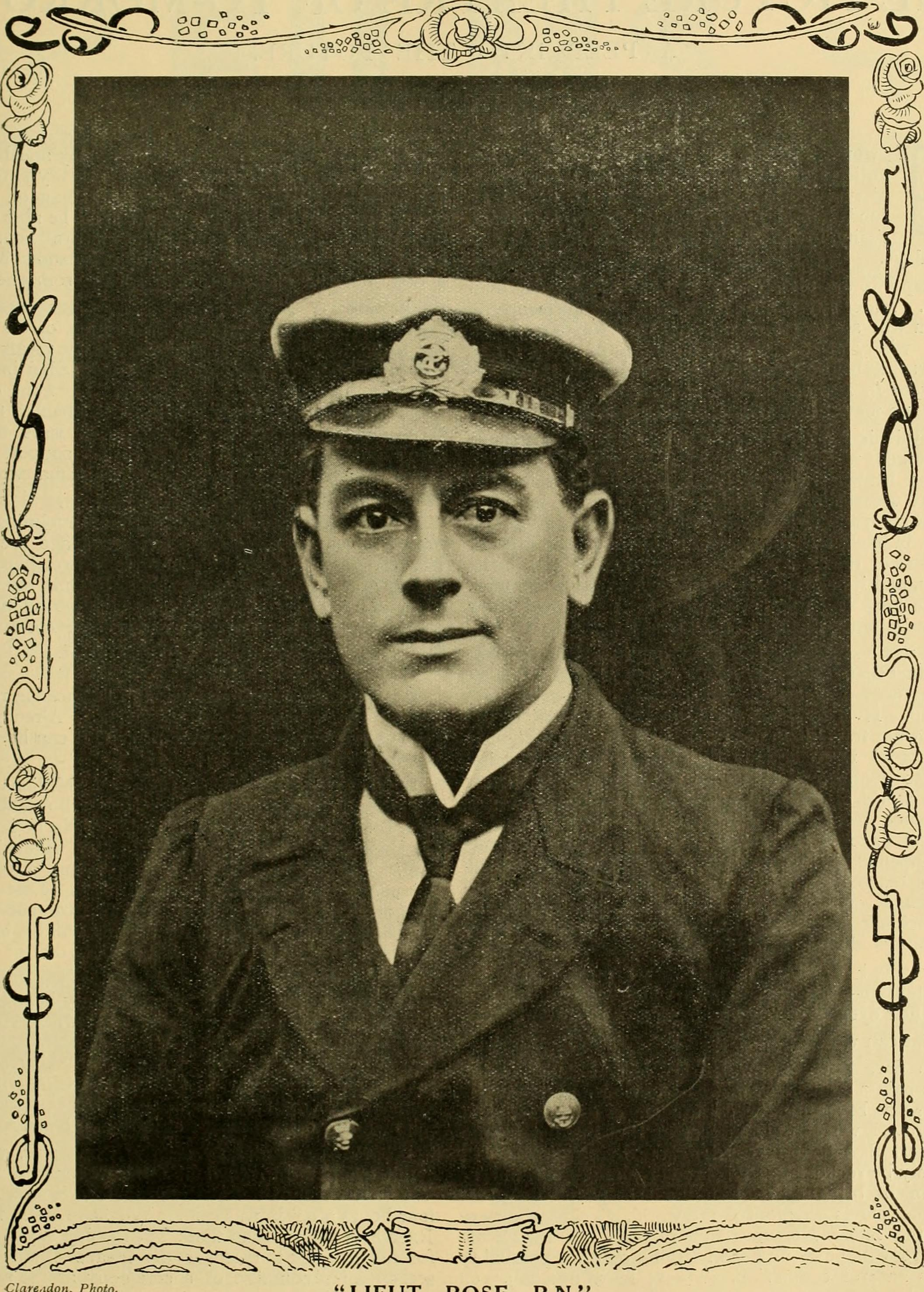
P. G. Norgate as Lieutenant Rose RN, 1912

- Lieutenant Rose and the Robbers of Fingall's Creek (1910)
- Lieutenant Rose and the Foreign Spy (1910)
- Lieutenant Rose and the Gunrunners (1910)
- Lieutenant Rose and the Stolen Submarine (1910)
- Lieutenant Rose and the Chinese Pirates (1910)
- Lieutenant Rose and the Stolen Code (1911)
- Lieutenant Rose and the Boxers (1911)
- Lieutenant Rose and the Royal Visit (1911)
- Lieutenant Rose and the Stolen Ship (1912)
- Lieutenant Rose and the Moorish Raiders (1912)
- Lieutenant Rose and the Hidden Treasure (1912)
- Lieutenant Rose and the Train Wreckers (1912)
- Lieutenant Rose and the Patent Aeroplane (1912)
- Lieutenant Rose in the China Seas (1913)
- Lieutenant Rose and the Stolen Bullion (1913)
- Lieutenant Rose and the Sealed Orders (1914)
- How Lieutenant Rose RN Spiked the Enemy's Guns (1915)
