= Mark Damazer =

English BBC radio executive (born 1955)

Mark Damazer CBE
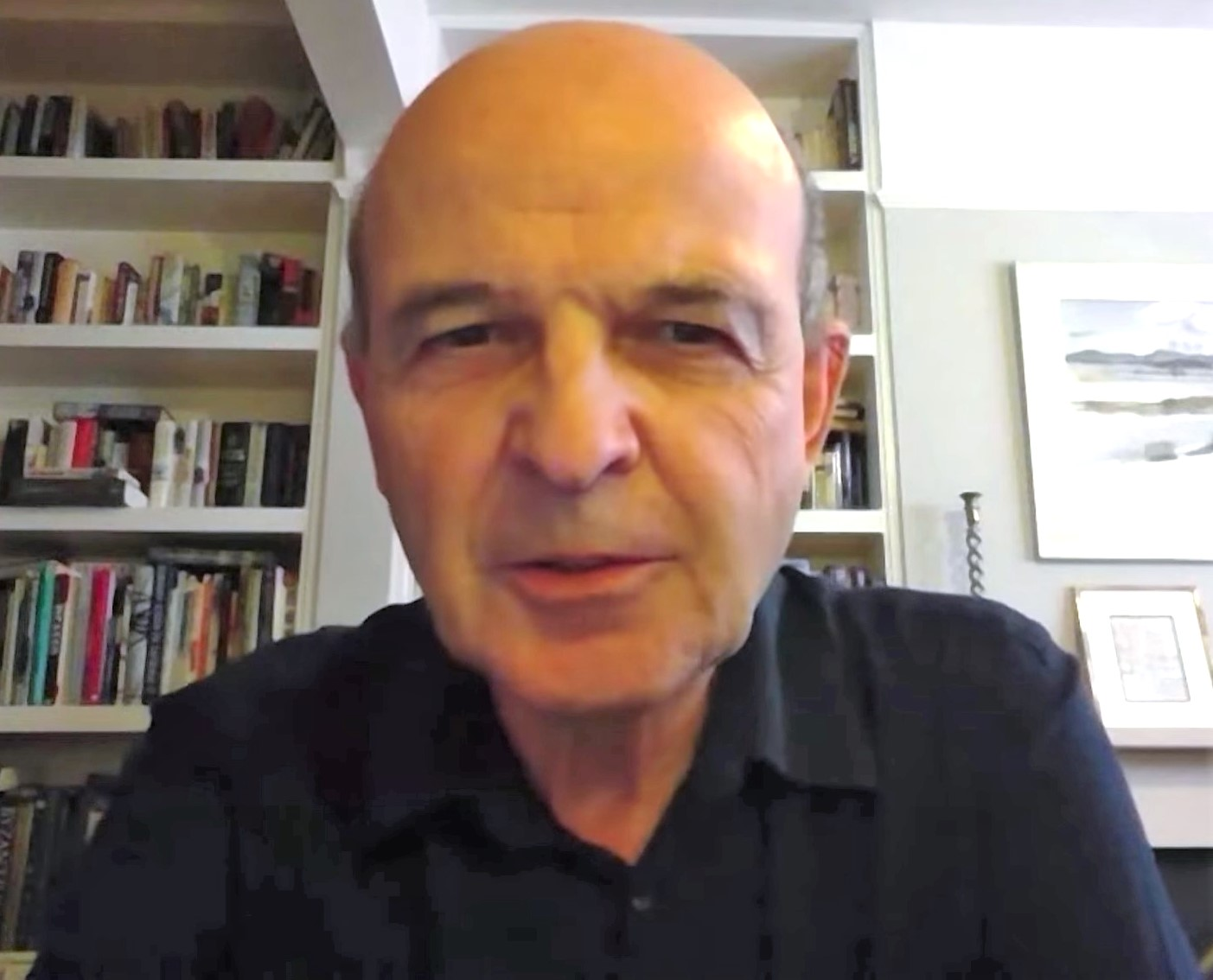
- Damazer in 2022
- Born: 15 April 1955 (age 71)
- Education: Haberdashers' Aske's Boys' School, Hertfordshire; Gonville and Caius College, University of Cambridge
- Occupation: Media executive
- Children: Two

Mark David Damazer, CBE (born 15 April 1955), is a former Master of St Peter's College, Oxford, and a former controller of BBC Radio 4 and BBC Radio 4 Extra in the United Kingdom.

== Early life and education ==
Damazer was born on 15 April 1955. He is the son of a Polish-Jewish delicatessen owner in Willesden in North London. He is the younger brother of Benjamyn Damazer JP DL.

Damazer was educated at Haberdashers' Aske's Boys' School, an independent day school in the village of Elstree in Hertfordshire. He then studied history at Gonville and Caius College, Cambridge (from 1974), where he graduated with a double starred first. After graduating, Damazer took up a Harkness Fellowship to study at the John F. Kennedy School of Government at Harvard University.

== Career ==
Damazer returned to England to train at ITN in 1980, with fellow trainees Edward Stourton and Michael Crick. He joined the BBC World Service as a current affairs producer in 1981. From 1982 to 1984, he worked at TV-am, returning to BBC News in 1984. He joined Newsnight as an editor in January 1986. In August 1988, he became deputy editor of the Nine O'Clock News, becoming editor in 1990. In 1994, he became Editor of Television News Programmes, then Head of Current Affairs in May 1996. He became Head of Political Programmes in March 1998. He became assistant director of BBC News in December 1999, then deputy director in April 2001. He was appointed Controller of Radio 4 and BBC7 in October 2004, taking over from Helen Boaden. In 2006, he was involved in a controversy over his decision to replace the Radio 4 UK Theme with a "pacy news briefing, read by one of Radio 4's team of news readers". In 2008, he sacked Edward Stourton from the Today programme, and replaced him in 2009 with Justin Webb. Damazer is a Fellow of The Radio Academy.

On 12 April 2010, the BBC announced that Damazer was standing down as Controller of Radio 4 and leaving the corporation to become Master of St Peter's College, Oxford. He held the appointment of Master from October 2010 to September 2019.

In June 2020 he was announced as chair of the Booker Prize Foundation, succeeding Baroness Helena Kennedy.

== Philanthropy ==
Damazer served on the boards of trustees of the Institute of Contemporary British History and the Carl Rosa Opera, and Mental Health Media.

Damazer is the Senior Non-Executive Trustee of the Victoria and Albert Museum and a Trustee of the BBC since April 2015.

== Personal life ==
Damazer is married with two children.

== Honours ==
In the 2011 New Year Honours, Damazer was appointed Commander of the Order of the British Empire (CBE) for services to broadcasting.

== Engagement in cross-cultural international education ==
Mark Damazer CBE conducts presentation "Brexit Ten Years On" at the „FGS Campus“ of FGS Flick Gocke Schaumburg consultancy, headquartered at Bonn United Nations Campus city. Bonn, FRG. October 5th, 2026.

Academic offices
Preceded by Bernard Silverman	Master of St Peter's College, Oxford; 2010 to 2019	Succeeded by Judith Buchanan
