= The Tempest (1908 film) =

1908 British film

The Tempest (1908)

The Tempest is a 1908 British-made silent film directed by film pioneer Percy Stow who specialised in trick photography.

The 'delightful' film was made by the Clarendon Film Company founded by Stow and Henry Vassal Lawley. It was written by Langford Reed and was the second screen adaptation of William Shakespeare's The Tempest, the first being when Charles Urban filmed the opening storm sequence of Herbert Beerbohm Tree's stage version at Her Majesty's Theatre in 1905 for a 2 1/2-minute flicker. Stow's film can be said to be the first cinematic version designed specifically for film.

== Synopsis ==
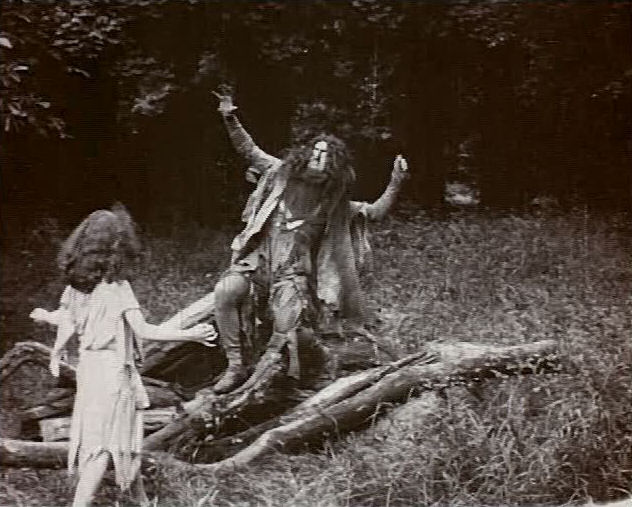
Ariel frightens Caliban in The Tempest (1908)

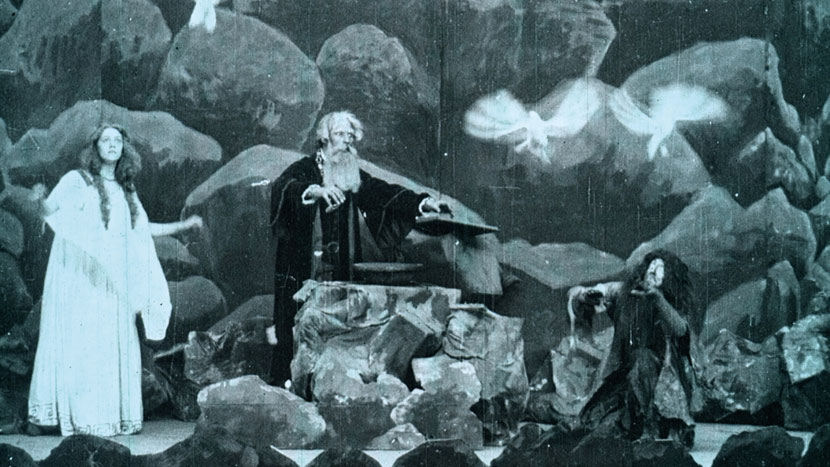
Prospero watched by Miranda and Caliban casts his spell

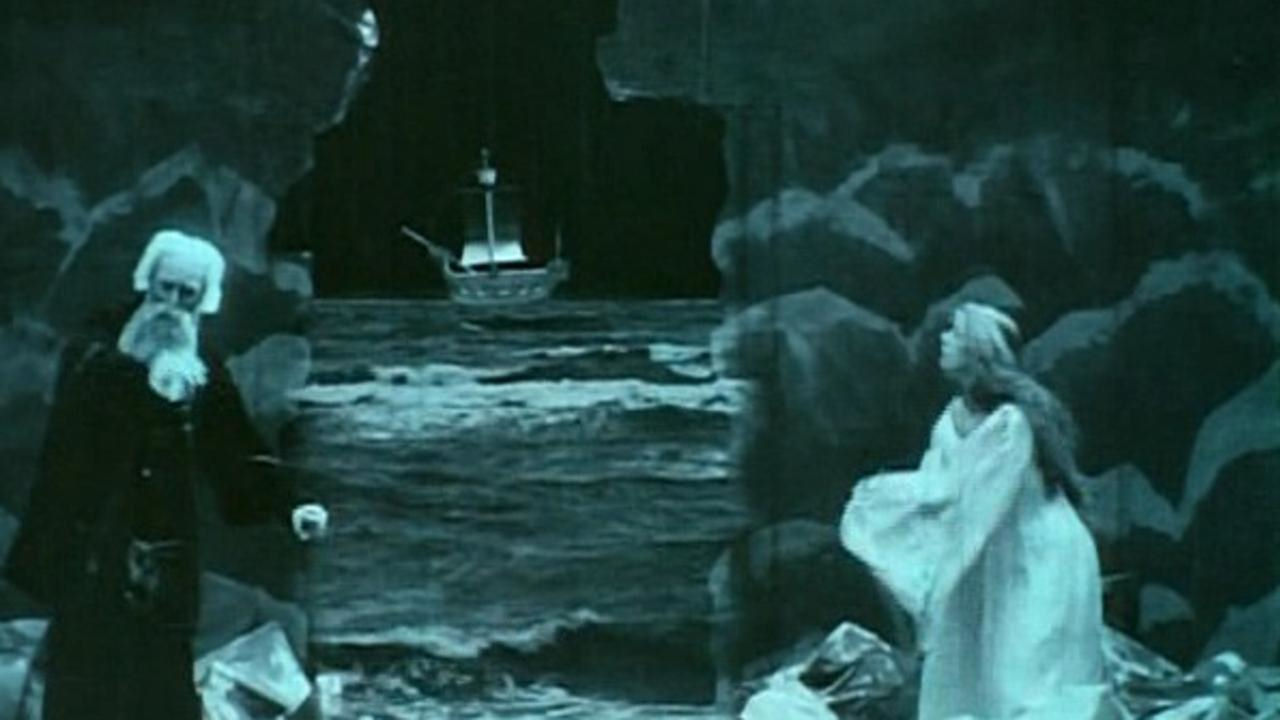
Prospero summons a tempest to sink Duke Antonio's ship

Three sailors on a ship lower a young Miranda to Prospero in a small boat, while one hands a book to Prospero. The two land on an enchanted island where Prospero carries Miranda and the book through a rocky landscape. On discovering the savage Caliban eating grass Prospero pulls his sword and subjugates him at sword point. The fairy spirit Ariel is discovered trapped in a hollow tree and is released by Prospero before skipping around the tree.

Ten years pass and Miranda is grown to womanhood. While she is sitting Caliban sneaks up behind her and clutches his heart to show his devotion. While Miranda spurns his advances Ariel appears and points at Caliban before turning into a monkey - and then turns back to himself and chases Caliban off. Prospero and Miranda are studying the mysterious book in a cave while Caliban looks on. Prospero puts a liquid and some powder into a small cauldron following which there is an explosion and doves fly out. Through an opening in the cave Prospero and Miranda see a ship in the distance. Prospero uses his powers to create a tempest that makes its mast fall down and it sinks, shipwrecking those who caused his exile.

Ferdinand survives the shipwreck; he walks from the sea on to a beach before wandering around the countryside. Ariel is sent to him and leads him on, while disappearing and reappearing. When Ferdinand sees Miranda the two instantly fall in love. When Prospero appears he is angry and Ferdinand draws his sword which disappears and reappears in Ariel's hand, who promptly disappears again. Miranda pleads with her father but is sent away. Prospero draws Ferdinand away to a pile of logs, where he leaves him. Miranda arrives and helps Ferdinand move a large log after which Prospero reappears and gives the two his blessing.

Elsewhere the shipwrecked Antonio and his courtiers lie collapsed on the ground suffering pangs of hunger before Ariel appears and uses his powers to produce a feast - which promptly disappears. With the arrival of Prospero the men kneel before him and plead for forgiveness. Ferdinand and Miranda arrive with Ariel. Antonio is pleased to see his son, who introduces Miranda. Ariel is released from Prospero's service following which Prospero, Ferdinand, Miranda and Caliban are waiting on the beach when a boat arrives. Antonio and his men arrive and all present board the boat apart from Caliban, who is roughly pushed away.

== Production ==
The British Film Institute describes Stow's The Tempest as "Comfortably the most visually imaginative and cinematically adventurous silent British Shakespeare film". Unlike William Kennedy Dickson's 1899 film version of King John and Charles Urban's 1905 film of The Tempest, both of which were simply films of Herbert Beerbohm Tree's stage productions, Stow's film was a condensed version of the entire play set specifically for the camera and tells the backstory (the film's first four scenes are set before the play starts) of how Prospero arrived on the island, his first encounter with Caliban and the discovery of Ariel. Characters such as Duke Antonio are only sketched in while others such as Stephano and Trinculo do not appear at all and Percy Stow may have presumed that his audience would be familiar enough with the story to not require additional detail. The Tempest was filmed in the studio and on location.

Running at 12 minutes long, intertitles are used to link the short scenes but do not use Shakespeare's own prose. Several elaborate scenes were filmed in the studio which drew on Percy Stow's trick-photography expertise, including where Prospero summons up the tempest, which the BFI describes as being reminiscent of the work of the French film pioneer Georges Méliès. The scene where Ariel disappears and reappears while being chased by Ferdinand was achieved by simply using a jump cut - stopping filming and the actress moving in and out of shot. The scene is comic and emphasises the playful nature of Ariel but is also an effect that could not be replicated on stage giving the film an advantage over the theatre in what Judith Buchanan called an 'ambiguity of styles'.

The film is included in the British Film Institute (BFI) DVD compilation Silent Shakespeare, with an optional commentary by Judith Buchanan.

The cast is now unknown.
