= Robert Wilmot Howard =

British priest and academic

The Reverend Canon Robert Wilmot Howard

Master of St Peter's Hall, Oxford
- In office 1945–1955
- Preceded by: Julian Thornton-Duesbery
- Succeeded by: Julian Thornton-Duesbery

Personal details
- Born: 16 September 1887
- Died: 23 November 1960 (aged 73)
- Citizenship: United Kingdom
- Education: Weymouth College
- Alma mater: Trinity College, Cambridge; Ridley Hall, Cambridge

Robert Wilmot Howard (16 September 1887 – 23 November 1960) was a British Church of England priest and academic, who was Canon Diocesan of Liverpool Cathedral (1943-1945) alongside being Principal of Liverpool College (1929-1945) and later Master of St Peter's Hall, Oxford (later known as St Peter's College) from 1945 to 1955.

== Biography ==
Howard was the son of the Revd Charles Howard, first Headmaster of Monkton Combe Junior School in Combe Down, near Bath, Somerset. He was educated at Monkton Combe School's Junior School before going on to Weymouth College, Trinity College, Cambridge and Ridley Hall, Cambridge. After ordination in 1912, he was from 1912 to 1915 Tutor to St Aidan's Theological College and became there a chaplain and then Vice-Principal. From 1916 to 1919 he was a chaplain in the British Expeditionary Force. He was from 1920 to 1923 Home Education Secretary of the Church Mission Society, from 1924 to 1928 Assistant Master at Eton College, from 1928 to 1945 Headmaster of Liverpool College, 1928-1945, and from 1945 to 1955 Master or St Peter's Hall, Oxford. When Howard worked at Liverpool College, he was also Canon Diocesan of Liverpool Cathedral from 1943 to 1945, becoming Canon Emeritus from 1945. From 1945 to 1955 he served as Rector of St Peter-le-Bailey, and Master of St Peter's Hall; in the latter office he was both preceded and succeeded by Julian Thornton-Duesbery.

Howard married and was the father of five children. He collected materials for a biography of Reverend Christopher Sargent but no drafts of a manuscript are available; the materials are at Cadbury Research Library, University of Birmingham. Liverpool University holds papers of Robert W. Howard, relating to St Aidan's College from 1919 to 1928.

== Selected publications ==
- as author and editor: Church Mission Society Handbook, Workers Together. 1924.
- A Merry Mountaineer: the story of Clifford Harris of Persia. 1931.
- Talks in Preparation for Confirmation. 1941.
- Howard, Robert Wilmot (1949). Should Women be Priests?; 3 sermons preached at the University of Oxford
