= How to Stop a Motor Car =

- Directed by: Percy Stow
- Starring: Cecil M. Hepworth; T.C. Hepworth; Claude Whitten
- Production company: Hepworth
- Release date: 1902
- Country: England

How to Stop a Motor Car is a 1902 British fantasy-comedy trick film directed by Percy Stow. Cecil M. Hepworth, T.C. Hepworth and Claude Whitten acted in the film. It was released in USA as Policeman and Automobile.
