= St Peter's College, Oxford =

College of the University of Oxford

St Peter's College
- University of Oxford
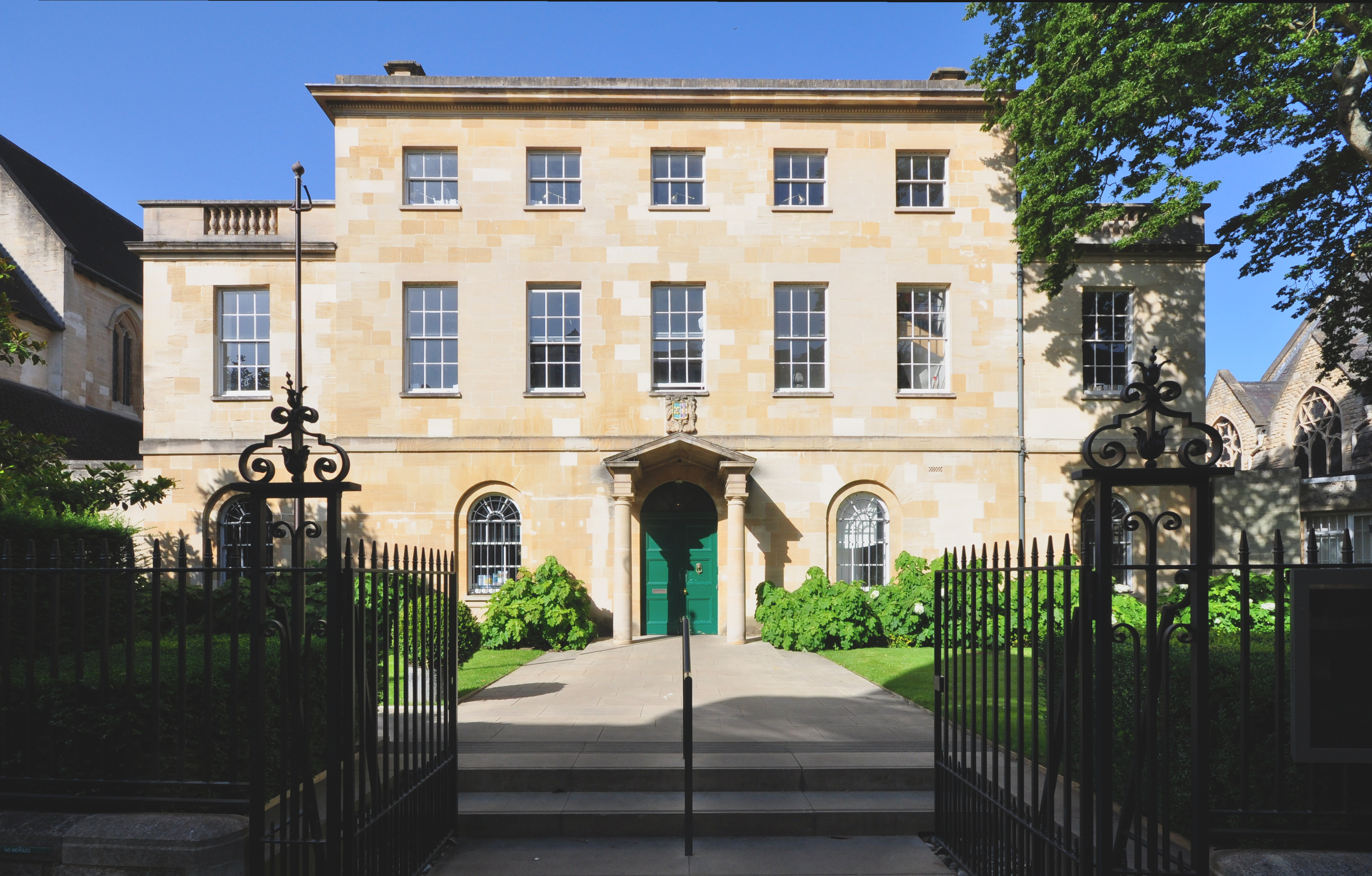
- St Peter's College from New Inn Hall Street

- Arms: Per pale vert and argent, to the dexter two keys in saltire or surmounted by a triple towered castle argent masoned sable and on the sinister a cross gules surmounted by a mitre or between four martlets sable, the whole within a bordure or.
- Location: New Inn Hall Street
- Coordinates: 51.752762°N 1.260721°W
- Full name: The Master, Fellows and Scholars of the College of St. Peter le Bailey in the University of Oxford
- Latin name: Collegium Sancti Petri, Collegium Sancti Petri Juxta Ballium
- Motto: Dum Spiro Spero (Latin)
- Motto in English: While I breathe, I hope
- Established: 1929 (attained full college status in 1961)
- Named for: Saint Peter; Church of St Peter-le-Bailey
- Former names: St Peter's Hall (1929–1961)
- Sister college: None
- Master: Judith Buchanan
- Undergraduates: 381
- Postgraduates: 217
- Endowment: £52.8 million (2023)
- Website: www.spc.ox.ac.uk//
- Boat club: Boatclub

Map
- Location within Oxford city centre

St Peter's College is a constituent college of the University of Oxford. Located on New Inn Hall Street, Oxford, United Kingdom, it occupies the site of two of the university's medieval halls dating back to at least the 14th century. The modern college was founded by Francis James Chavasse, former Bishop of Liverpool, opened as St Peter's Hall in 1929, and achieved full collegiate status as St Peter's College in 1961. Founded as a men's college, it has been coeducational since 1979.

As of 2023, the college had an estimated financial endowment of £52.8( million).

== History ==
=== Medieval halls ===
Although founded in its current form in the 20th century, St Peter's occupies a central Oxford location on the site of two of the university's medieval halls. The first Master of St Peter's called the acquisition of the site "a chance of ages".

The site was originally the location of Trilleck's Inn, later known as New Inn Hall, and Rose Hall. Trillecks' Inn was founded in the 14th century by Bishop Trilleck and, as New Inn Hall, merged into Balliol College in 1887. Rose Hall was given to New College by William of Wykeham. New College finally sold the site to the rector of St Peter-le-Bailey in 1859 and 1868 as a site for a new church, now the college chapel.

=== St Peter's Hall ===
The history of the college in its present form began in 1923 when Francis James Chavasse, former Bishop of Liverpool, returned to Oxford. He was concerned at the rising cost of education in the older universities in Britain, and projected St Peter's as a college where promising students, who might otherwise be deterred by the costs of college life, could obtain an Oxford education. After Francis James died in 1928, his son Christopher Chavasse launched a memorial appeal in his father's name to fund the project, raising £150,000 from donors including Ella Rowcroft to convert and build new buildings on the site. St Peter's was licensed by the university as a hostel that year and opened with 13 residents. The following year, 1929, it was recognised as a permanent private hall and grew to 40 students. A later significant benefactor was William Morris, 1st Viscount Nuffield, who would also found Nuffield College. The hall was sometimes nicknamed "Pot Hall".

During the Second World War, St Peter's Hall became home to evacuated students from Westfield College, a women's college of the University of London, and its students were boarded out to other colleges.

=== St Peter's College ===
In 1947, St Peter's was reclassified as a 'new foundation', and was finally recognised as a full college in 1961 with the granting of a royal charter. In 1979, St Peter's started admitting women and became co-educational.

== Buildings ==
St Peter's has a varied set of buildings, many of them much older than the college itself. The college has, in effect, adapted existing buildings to provide the collective facilities needed for college life, and built new ones to provide student accommodation.

=== Linton Quad ===
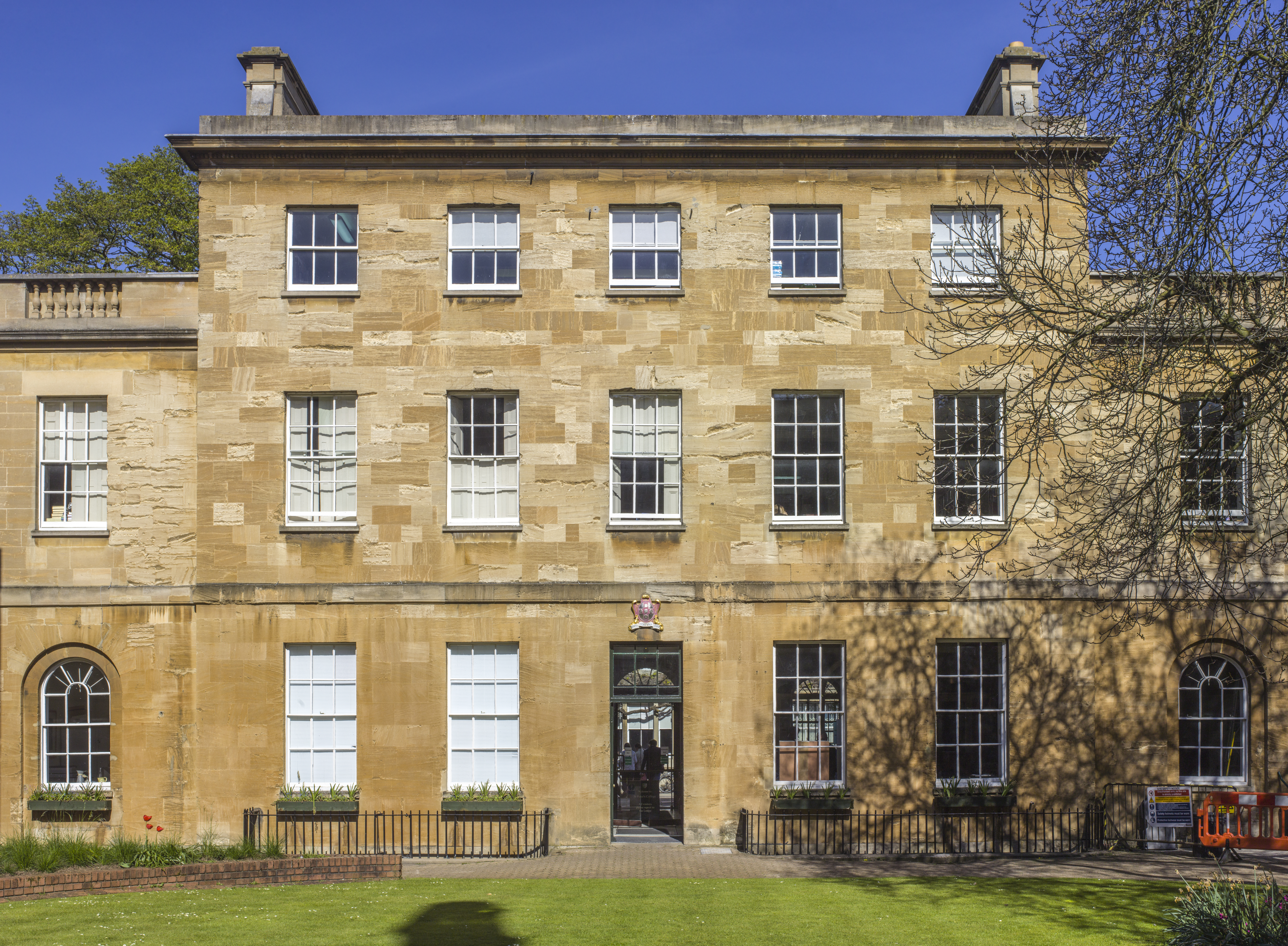
View of Linton House from Linton Quad.

Linton House, a Georgian rectory dating from 1797, stands on the east side of Linton Quad along New Inn Hall Street. It was originally built as the offices for the Oxford Canal Company and called Wyaston House. It was bought in 1878 by Canon Henry Linton who converted it to a rectory for the Church of St Peter-le-Bailey. Now known as Linton House, it serves as the porter's lodge (the entrance to the college) and is also home to the college library.

On the south side of the quad stands the college chapel, the Church of St Peter-le-Bailey. Built in 1874 and incorporating some of the stone of an earlier church, it is the third church of that name on or close to the site since the 12th century. Memorials to members of the Chavasse family in the chapel include Captain Noel Chavasse's original grave cross, a large bas-relief of Bishop Francis Chavasse at prayer and the Chavasse memorial window.

The quad also includes the Latner building.

=== Hannington Quad ===
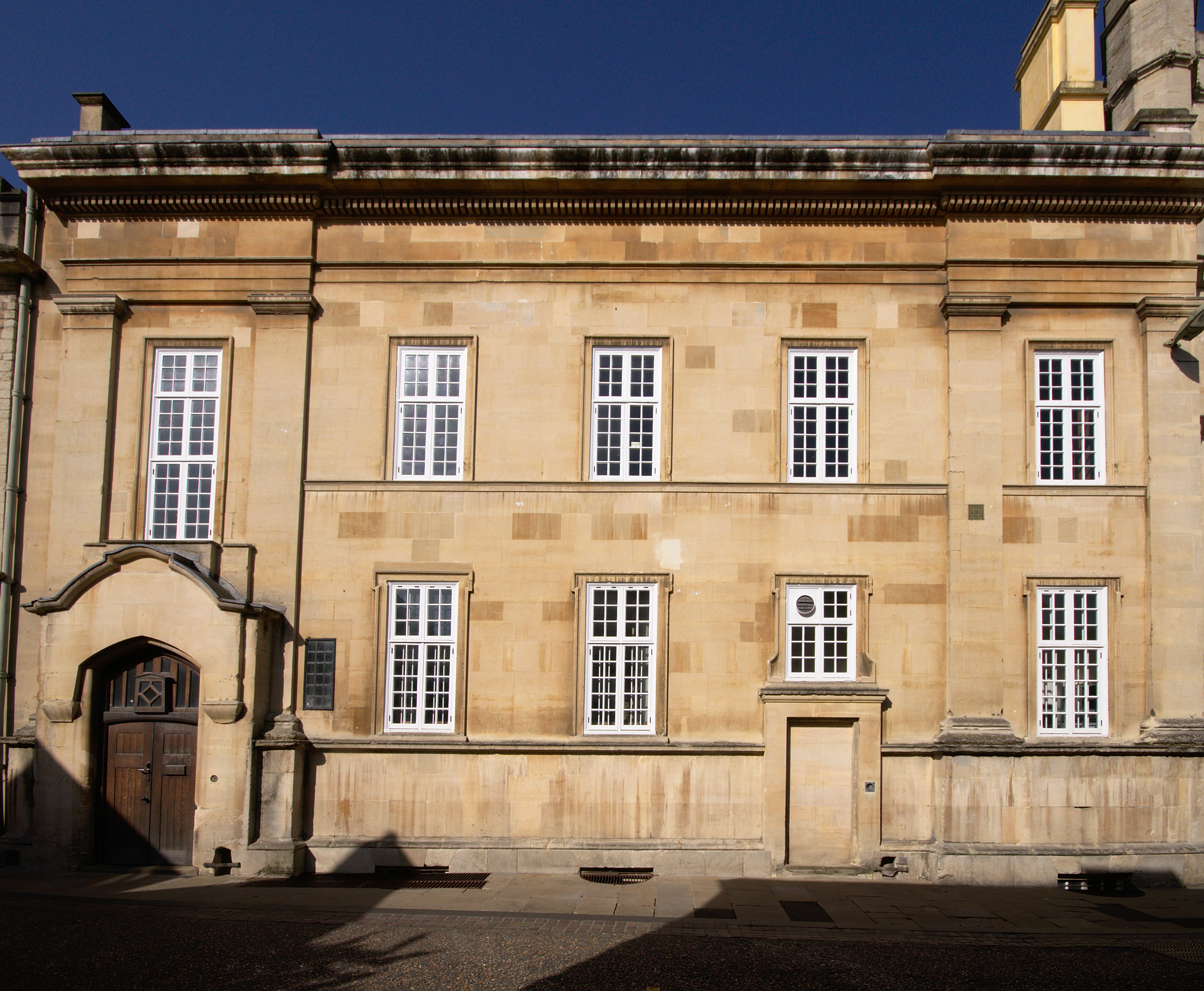
Hannington Hall, here viewed from New Inn Hall Street, is a surviving part of the New Inn Hall buildings.

In the Hannington Quad stands Hannington Hall. It dates from 1832 and is the only surviving part of New Inn Hall. The building was originally commissioned by John Cramer, principal of New Inn Hall, as student accommodation and was designed by architect Thomas Greenshields. When New Inn Hall was absorbed by Balliol in 1887 and most of New Inn Hall's buildings were demolished to make room for the Central Girls School building (now part of St Peter's Chavasse Quad), the Cramer building survived. It was bought by Reverend Talbot Rice, rector of St-Peter-le-Bailey, in 1897 and renamed after the Victorian missionary Bishop James Hannington. After the founding of St Peter's it was remodelled to function as the dining hall.

The quad was formed by the construction of an accommodation block designed by Sir Herbert Baker and Fielding Dodd behind the older buildings.

=== Chavasse Quad ===
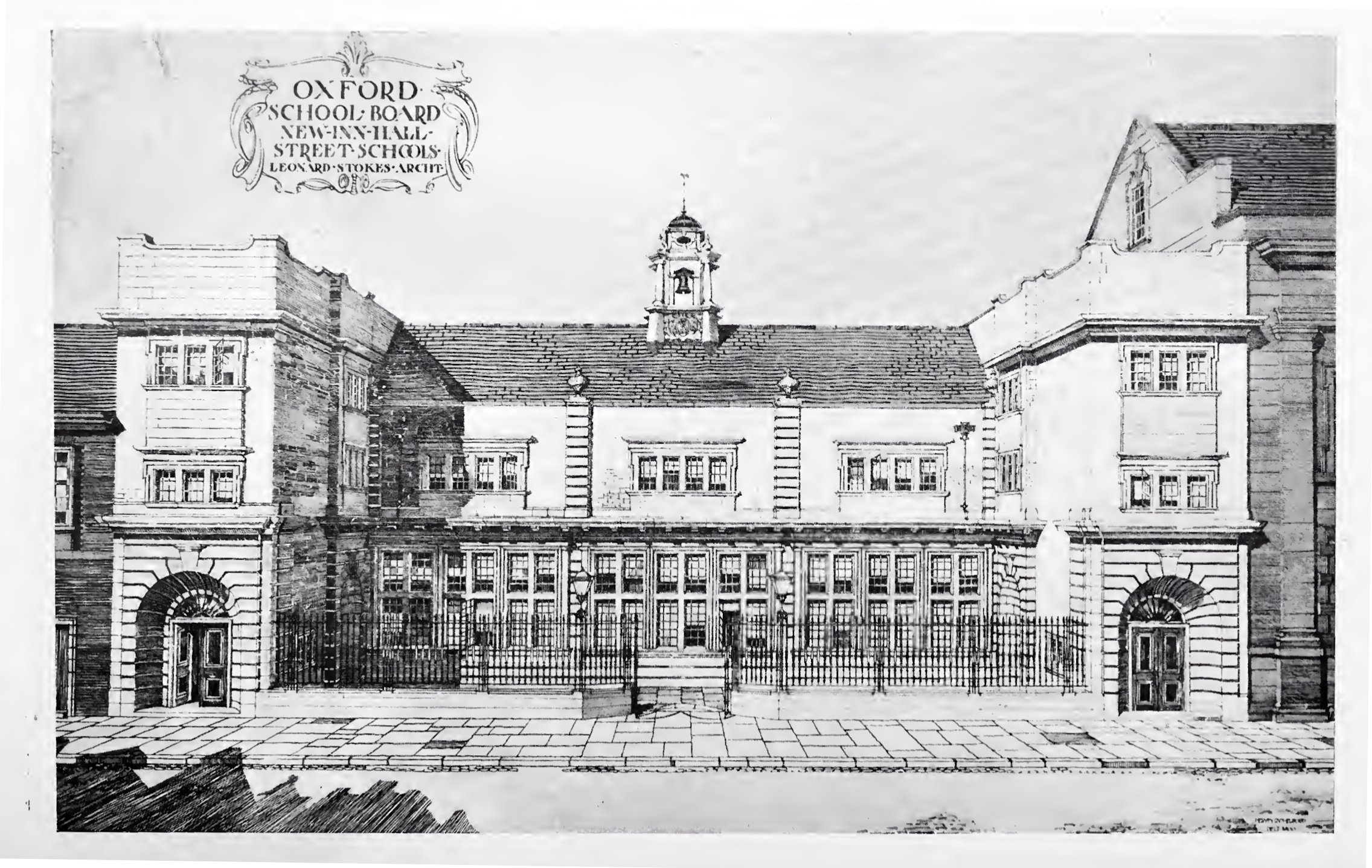
Architect's drawing of the New Inn Hall Street schools by Leonard Stoke. The schools are now the Chavasse Building.

The Central Girls' School to the South of the original site of the college was designed by Leonard Stokes and completed in 1901. It was converted into the college's Chavasse Building between 1984 and 1986 and provides living accommodation for students and seminar rooms. In 2018 the new Hubert Perrodo Building was completed offering further on-site accommodation and conference spaces. The Middle Common Room (MCR) for postgraduates, and a music room are also located in the Pastry School in the quad's southwest corner.

=== Mulberry Quad ===
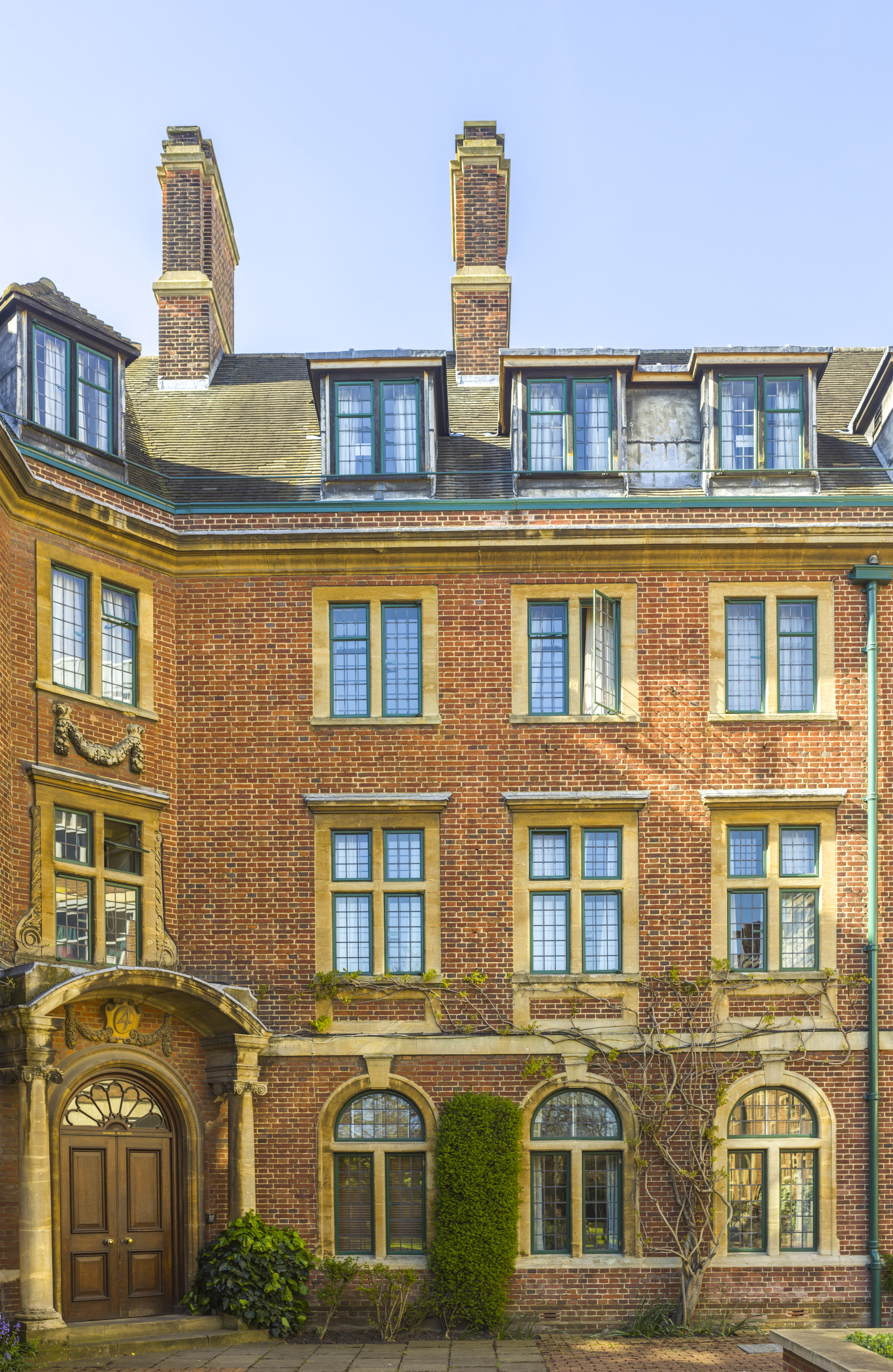
Morris building.

The Mulberry Quad lies to the northwest of the Linton and provides for the direct access to the JCR. The Morris Building, currently student accommodation, was given by Lord Nuffield in memory of his mother, Emily Morris. The Matthews block houses the JCR as well as the student-run bar. The Dorfman Centre lies in the northwest corner of the quad. Mulberry Quad also provides access to Bulwarks Lane.

=== Castle Bailey Quad ===
The Castle Bailey Quad is St Peter's latest build, housing 54 undergraduate students across Damazer House (named after former Master, Mark Damazer) and Westfield House (named in honour of the women of Westfield College, London, who relocated to St Peter's during World War II). Other support facilities, including Fellow’s Rooms and an estates workshop and office, can be found on the ground floor. Castle Bailey Quad was funded through almost 900 donors and alumni contributions of close to £14m. The quad was officially opened on 15 June 2024 by the then Chancellor, Chris Patten

=== Canal House ===
Canal House, the master's lodge, dates from the early 19th century.

=== Annexes ===
St Peter's also has a few off-site accommodation blocks for students, a few minutes away from the main college site. St Thomas' Street and St George's Gate house undergraduates, while Paradise Street (which was officially opened in June 2008) houses postgraduates and fourth-year undergraduates.

== Student life ==
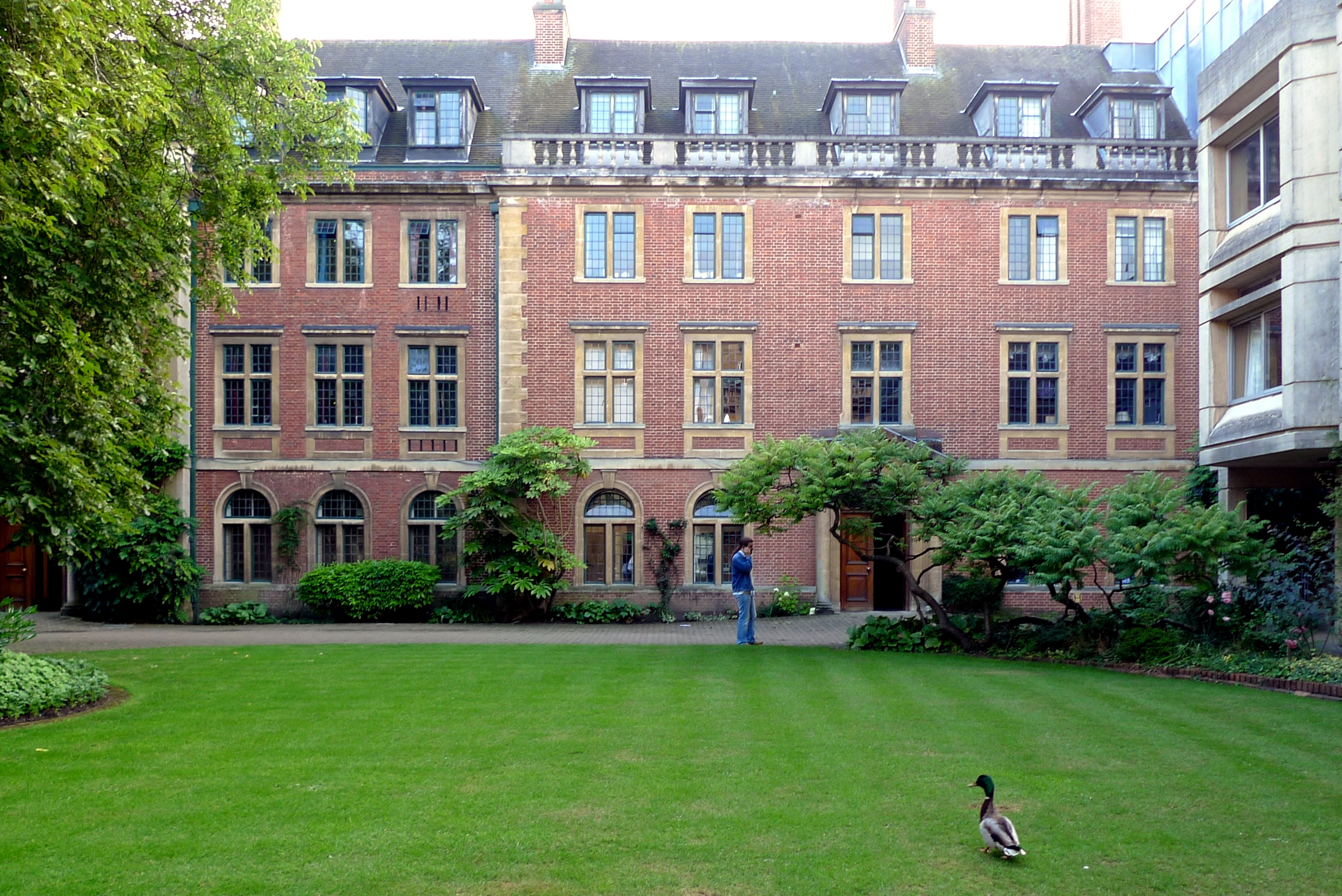
The on-site student accommodation includes these Neo-Georgian rooms, known as Besse Staircase after Antonin Besse.

The student-run Junior Common Room organises a wide variety of social events throughout the academic year, ranging from formal events to celebrate such things as Burns Night (complete with haggis and poetry) to creatively themed parties that run into the early hours of the morning. The college is one of the few to feature its own student-edited arts magazine, Misc, which is published termly. The college also has a student-run college bar, which serves the Cross Keys cocktail.

=== Sports ===
The college has sports teams competing in rowing, cricket, football, hockey, rugby, and pool. It shares with Exeter and Hertford Colleges a sports field which has two cricket pitches and pavilions, two rugby and football pitches, a hockey pitch, tennis courts and a squash court.

The college boat club, St Peter's College Boat Club, competes regularly. The club shares a boathouse with Somerville College Boat Club, University College Boat Club and Wolfson College Boat Club.

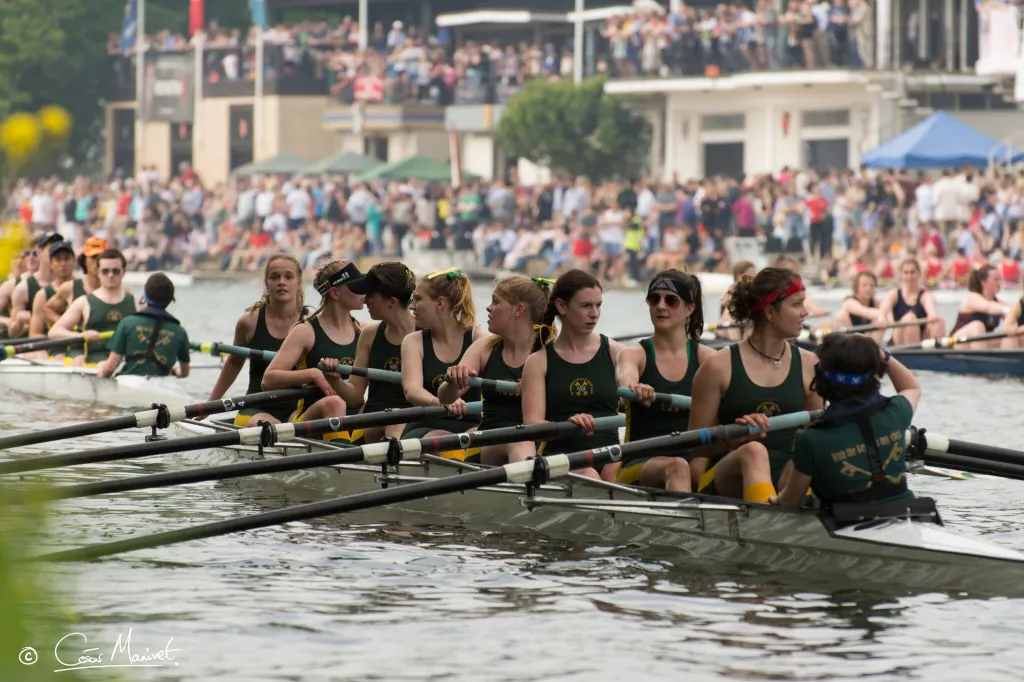
St Peter's College Boat Club competes in 2 main competitions annually: Torpids and Summer VIII's.

== Locomotive ==
Taking the original name of the college, GWR 6959 Class steam locomotive no. 7900 was built in 1949 for British Railways and named "Saint Peter's Hall" (no abbreviation). One of the brass nameplates from the now-scrapped locomotive survives in the college on the far wall of the college bar.

== People associated with the college ==
=== Masters ===
- Christopher Maude Chavasse (1929–1940)
- Julian Thornton-Duesbery (1940–1944; first term)
- Robert Wilmot Howard (1945–1955)
- Julian Thornton-Duesbery (1955–1968; second term)
- Alec Cairncross (1969–1978)
- Gerald Aylmer (1979–1991)
- John Barron (1991–2003)
- Bernard Silverman (2003–2009)
- Mark Damazer (2010–2019)
- Judith Buchanan (from October 2019)

=== Notable alumni ===
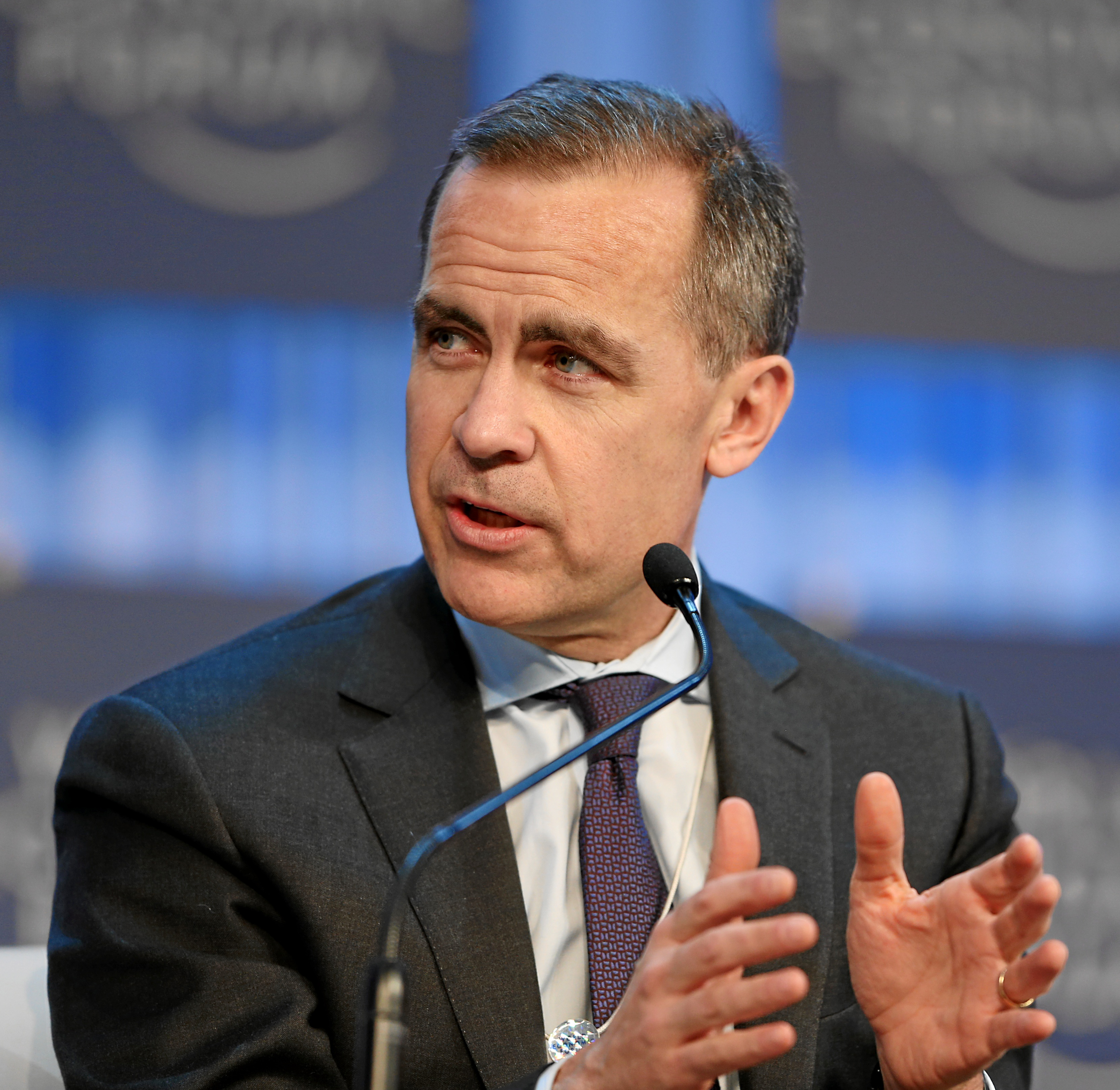
Mark Carney, Prime Minister of Canada, former Governor of the Bank of England

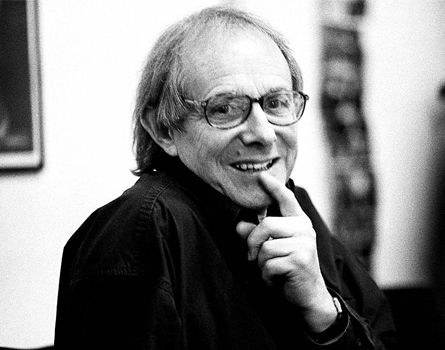
Ken Loach, English film and television director

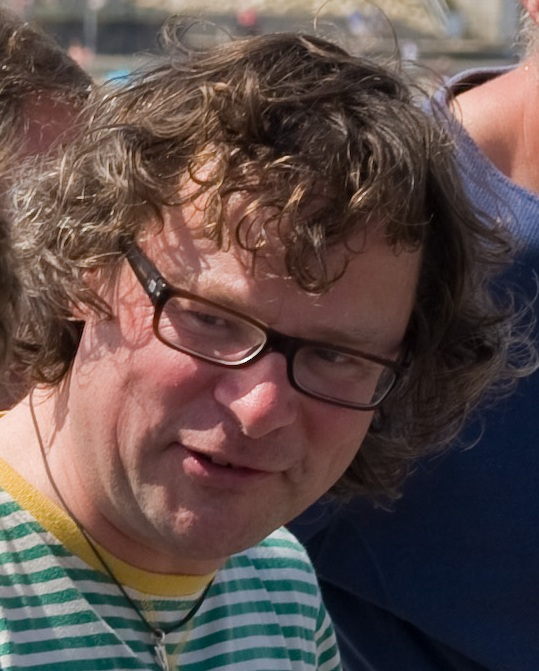
Hugh Fearnley-Whittingstall, celebrity chef and television personality

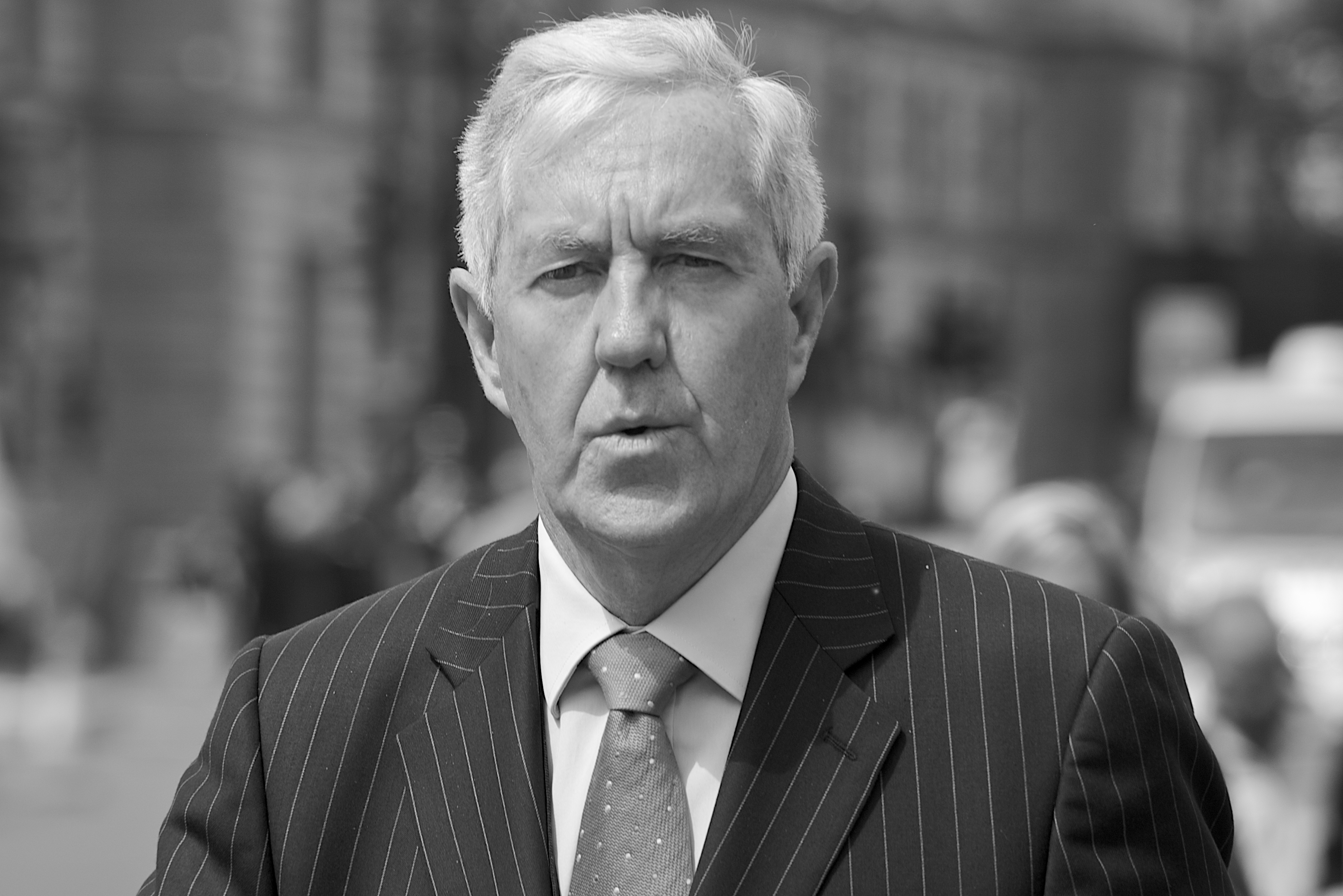
Lord Condon, former Commissioner of the Metropolitan Police

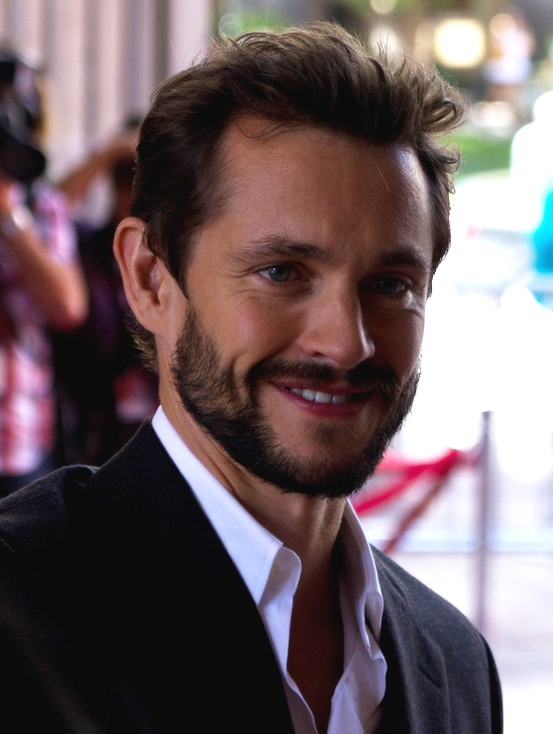
Hugh Dancy, actor and model

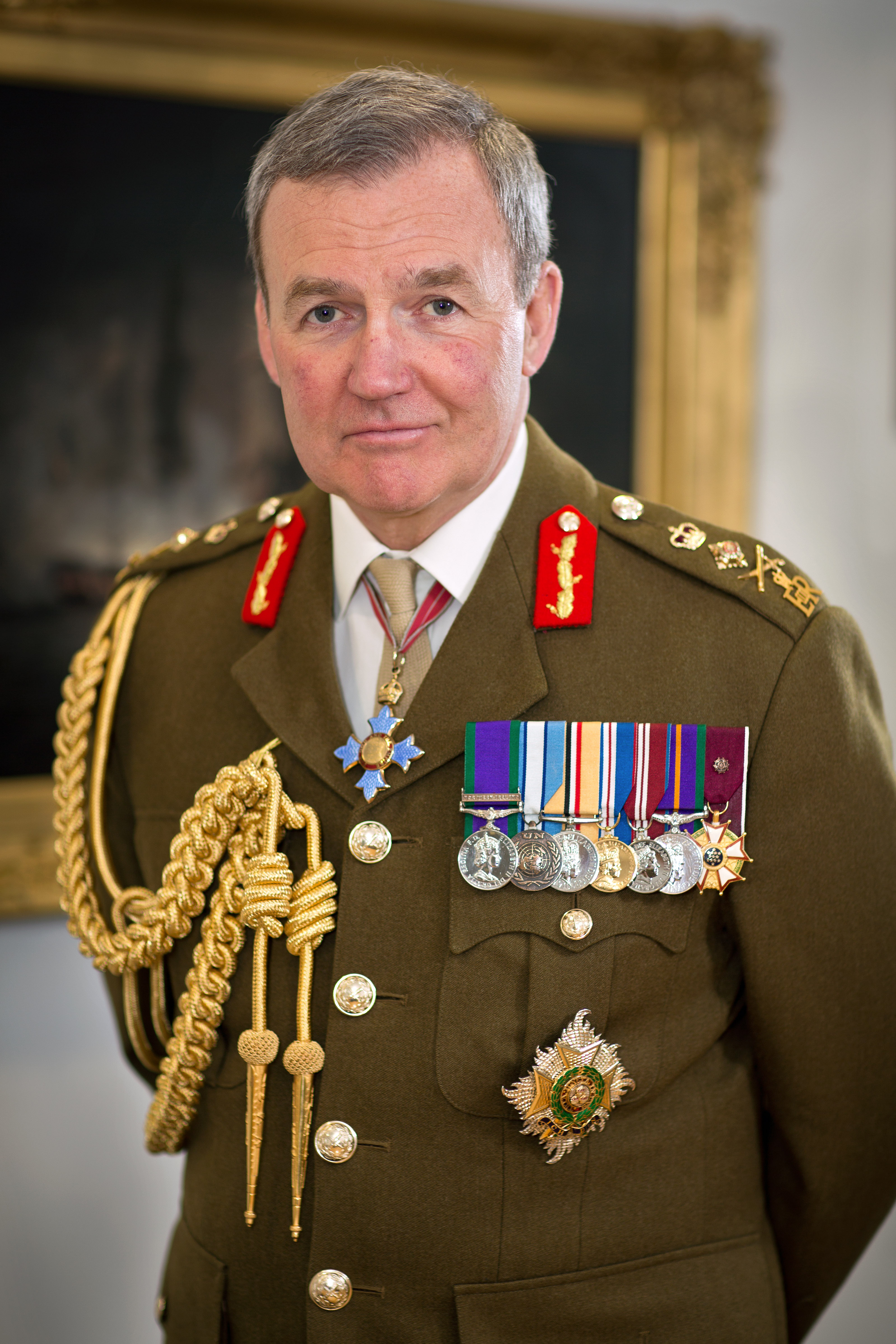
Lord Houghton, former Chief of Joint Operations, British Armed Forces

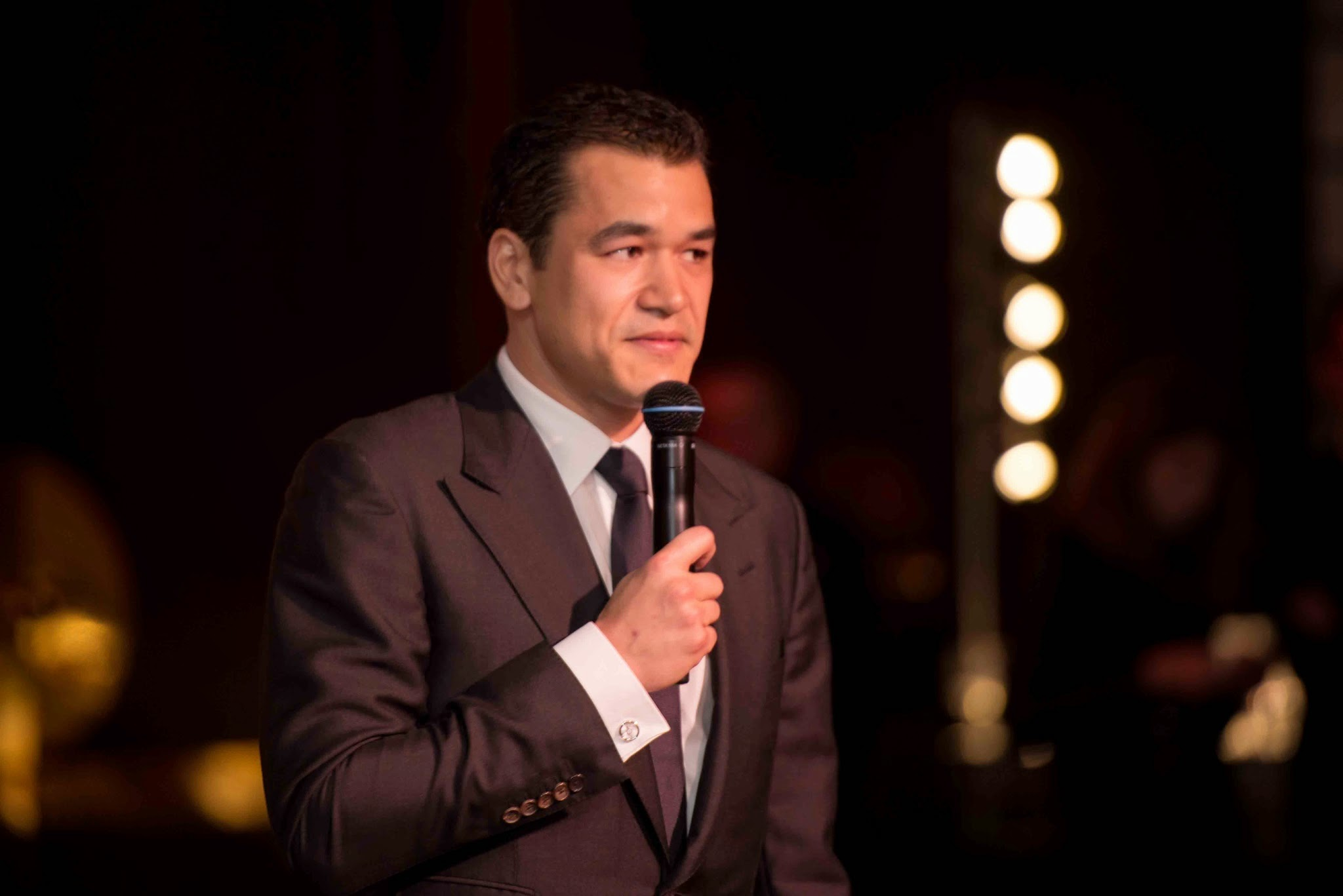
François Perrodo, entrepreneur and president of the energy company Perenco

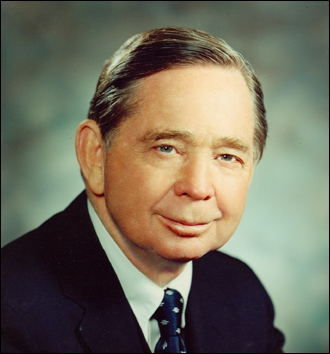
Carl Albert, former Speaker of the United States House of Representatives
- Chris Van Tulleken, Infection doctor, academic, BBC broadcaster
- Edward Akufo-Addo, 2nd President of Ghana
- Guy Arnold, explorer, traveller, political commentator, Africa expert and writer
- Wilbert Awdry, creator of Thomas the Tank Engine
- Simon Beaufoy, writer of the screenplay for the films The Full Monty and Slumdog Millionaire
- Graham Bell, Canadian academic, writer and evolutionary biologist
- Michael Blomquist, American rower and former world champion
- Kenneth Bloomfield, Head of the Northern Ireland Civil Service and member of the Independent Commission for the Location of Victims' Remains
- E. A. Boateng, Ghanaian academic, first vice chancellor of the University of Cape Coast
- Mike Carey, author
- Kenneth Chan Ka-lok, member of the Hong Kong Legislative Council
- Paul Condon, Baron Condon, Commissioner of the Metropolitan Police from 1993 to 2000
- Gordon Corera, BBC security correspondent
- Peter Dale, poet
- Jamie Dalrymple, Middlesex, Glamorgan and England cricketer
- David Davies, football administrator
- Jack Dormand, later Baron Dormand of Easington, Labour MP for Easington, 1970–87
- Modjaben Dowuona, first Registrar of the University of Ghana; Minister for Education (1966–1969)
- David Eastwood, Vice-Chancellor of the University of Birmingham
- Hugh Fearnley-Whittingstall, chef and TV presenter
- Paul S. Fiddes, former principal of Regent's Park College, Oxford
- Matt Frei, BBC Washington correspondent
- Robert Gavron, Baron Gavron, chairman of the Guardian Media Group and trustee of the Scott Trust
- Geordie Greig, editor of The Independent
- Robert Hanson, financier
- Afua Hirsch, author
- Andy Hornby, chief executive of Coral, former chief executive of HBOS
- Field Marshal Nicholas Houghton, Baron Houghton of Richmond, Chief of the Defence Staff
- Rex Masterman Hunt, Governor of the Falkland Islands
- Martin Ivens, editor of The Sunday Times
- Kurt Jackson, painter
- Libby Lane, Bishop of Derby, first woman consecrated a bishop in the Church of England, and current Visitor of the college
- Helen Lewis, New Statesman deputy editor
- Richard Lloyd Parry, Asia editor for The Times of London
- David Moxon, former archbishop of New Zealand
- John Pritchard, Bishop of Oxford (2007–2014)
- Paul Reeves, former archbishop of New Zealand and Governor-General of New Zealand
- Gareth Russell, author
- Dominic Shellard, vice-chancellor of De Montfort University
- Jake Wallis Simons, British journalist and novelist
- Greg Stafford, Member of Parliament for Farnham and Bordon 2024-
- Sir Mark Stanhope, First Sea Lord and Chief of Naval Staff
- Christopher Tambling (1964–2015), composer, organist and choirmaster
- Jigyel Ugyen Wangchuck, former heir to the throne of Bhutan
- George Whipple III, American lawyer and society reporter
- William Wickham (1831–1897), alumnus of New Inn Hall and MP for Petersfield
- Daniel Woolf, historian; principal and vice-chancellor (2009–2019) of Queen's University, Canada
- Ben Wright, BBC political correspondent
