= Julian Thornton-Duesbery =

British priest and academic (1902–1985)

The Reverend Canon Julian Thornton-Duesbery
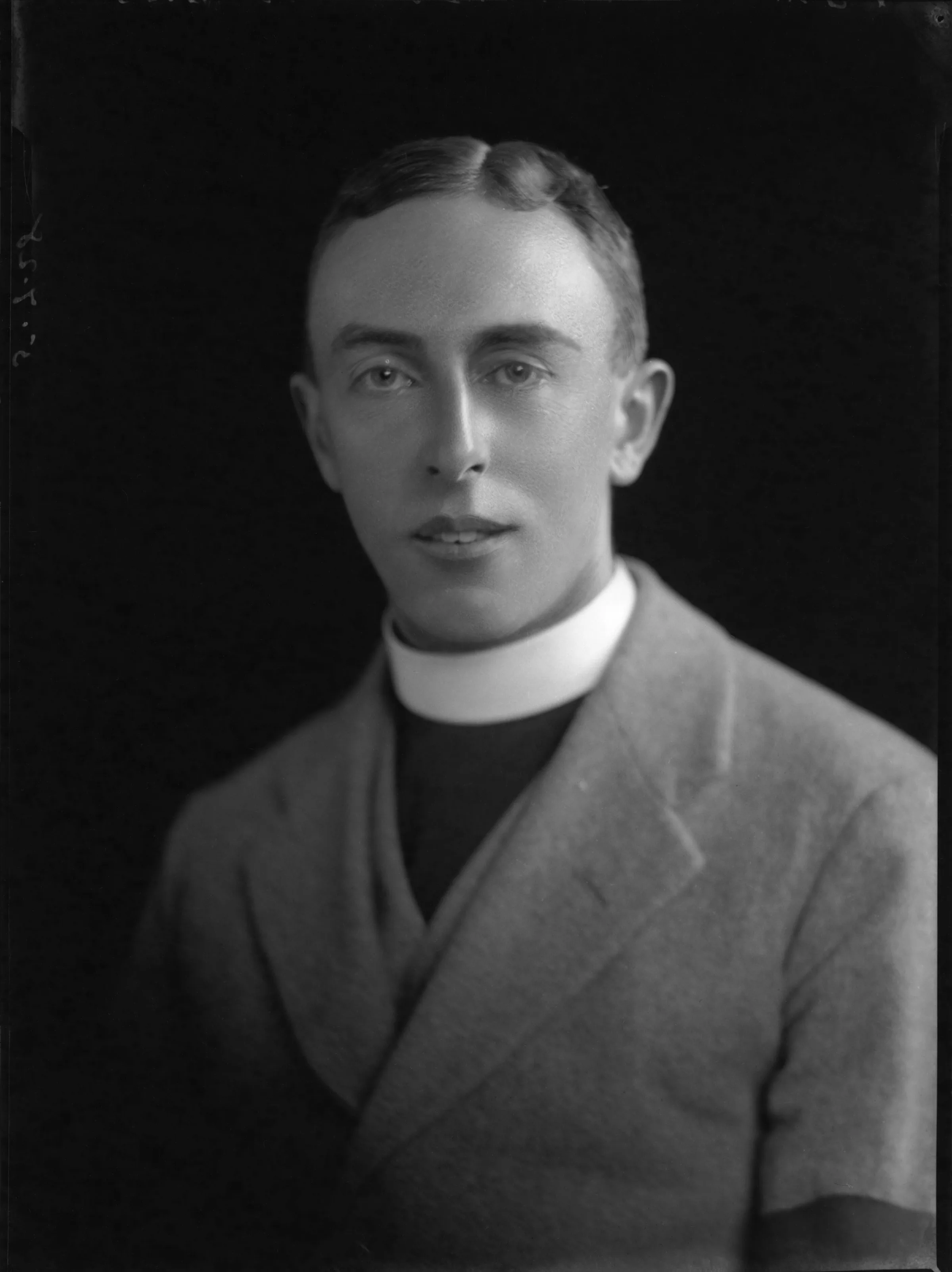
- Thornton-Duesbery in 1928

Master of St Peter's College, Oxford (known as St Peter's Hall, Oxford until 1961)
- In office 1955–1968
- Preceded by: Robert Wilmot Howard
- Succeeded by: Alexander Cairncross

Principal of Wycliffe Hall, Oxford
- In office 1944–1955
- Preceded by: John Taylor

Master of St Peter's Hall, Oxford
- In office 1940–1944
- Preceded by: Christopher Chavasse
- Succeeded by: Alexander Cairncross

Personal details
- Born: Julian Percy Thornton-Duesbery; 7 September 1902 Godmanchester
- Died: 1 April 1985 (aged 82)
- Citizenship: United Kingdom
- Education: Rossall School; Balliol College, Oxford; Wycliffe Hall, Oxford

Ecclesiastical career
- Religion: Christianity
- Church: Church of England
- Ordained: 1926 (deacon); 1927 (priest)
- Congregations served: Church of St Peter-le-Bailey, Oxford; Liverpool Cathedral

Julian Percy Thornton-Duesbery (7 September 1902 – 1 April 1985) was a British Church of England priest and academic. He was Master of St Peter's Hall, Oxford (later known as St Peter's College) from 1940 to 1944, and from 1955 to 1968. He also served as Principal of Wycliffe Hall, Oxford, an Anglican theological college, from 1944 to 1955.

== Early life ==
Thornton-Duesbery was born at Isle House, Godmanchester, on 7 September 1902, son of the Rev. Charles Thornton-Duesbury, later Bishop of Sodor and Man. He was educated at Rossall School, then an all-boys public school in Lancashire. He then matriculated at Balliol College, Oxford, where he studied classics. He obtained first class honours in Honour Moderations in 1923, and first class honours in Literae Humaniores in 1925. He then joined Wycliffe Hall, Oxford, where he studied theology. He obtained first class honours in 1926 and was awarded the Junior Greek Testament Prize.

== Career ==
=== Ordained ministry ===
Thornton-Duesbery was ordained in the Church of England as a deacon in 1926 and as a priest in 1927. He served at his alma mater, Wycliffe Hall, Oxford as chaplain from 1926 to 1927 and then as Vice-Principal from 1927 to 1933. In May 1928, he was additionally appointed Chaplain of Corpus Christi College, Oxford.

From 1940 to 1945, while also Master of St Peter's Hall for the first time, Thornton-Duesbery was Rector of Church of St Peter-le-Bailey, Oxford. He was also a Select Preacher to the University of Oxford between 1943 and 1945.

After retiring from the mastership in 1968, he moved to Liverpool where he was appointed Canon Theologian of the Liverpool Cathedral. He was appointed Canon Emeritus in 1977 on his retirement.

=== Academic career ===
From 1928 to 1933, Thornton-Duesbery was a fellow and the librarian of Corpus Christi College, Oxford; this was in addition to his chaplaincy to the college and leadership role at Wycliffe Hall. In July 1933, he left his university focused life to enter the world of schooling. He was invited by Francis Graham Brown, the Anglican Bishop in Jerusalem, to become the Headmaster of St. George's School, an Anglican boys school in Jerusalem.

In 1940, he was appointed Master of St Peter's Hall, Oxford in succession to Christopher Chavasse. In 1944, he left St Peter's and was appointed Principal of Wycliffe Hall, Oxford. He replaced John Taylor who had been appointed Bishop of Sodor and Man. In 1955, he was once more appointed Master of St Peter's Hall. During his leadership, the then permanent private hall achieved full collegiate status within the University of Oxford, becoming St Peter's College in 1961.
