= John Barron (classicist) =

British classical scholar (1934–2008)

John Barron FSA MAE

7th Master of St Peter's College, Oxford
- In office 1991–2003
- Preceded by: Gerald Aylmer
- Succeeded by: Bernard Silverman

Director of the Institute of Classical Studies
- In office 1984–1991
- Preceded by: Eric Handley
- Succeeded by: Richard Sorabji

Personal details
- Born: John Penrose Barron; 27 April 1934 Morley, Yorkshire, England
- Died: 16 August 2008 (aged 74) London, England
- Education: Clifton College
- Alma mater: Balliol College, Oxford

John Penrose Barron, FSA, MAE (27 April 1934 – 16 August 2008) was a British classical scholar. He was Director of the Institute of Classical Studies, University of London from 1984 to 1991, and Master of St Peter's College, Oxford, from 1991 to 2003.

== Early life and education ==
Barron was born on 27 April 1934 in Morley, Yorkshire, England. He was educated at Queen Elizabeth Grammar School, an all-boys private school in Wakefield, and at Clifton College, then also an all-boys independent school in Bristol. He matriculated into Balliol College, Oxford, in 1953; he had originally intended to study law but was convinced by a college tutor to switch to Lit. Hum. (Classics). Among his tutors were Kenneth Dover and Russell Meiggs. He graduated from the University of Oxford with a first class Bachelor of Arts (BA) degree in 1957. He remained at Oxford to study for a Doctor of Philosophy (DPhil) degree under the supervision of Antony Andrewes, which he completed in 1961. His doctoral thesis was on the early history of Samos, and was titled The history of Samos to 439 B. C..

== Academic career ==
Barron began his academic career in 1959, having been appointed an assistant lecturer in Latin at Bedford College, London: he was promoted to lecturer in 1961. In 1964, he joined University College, London as a lecturer in archaeology. He was appointed Reader in Archaeology and Numismatics in 1967.

In 1971, he was appointed Professor of Greek Language and Literature at King's College, London: he was therefore appointed to a chair at the unusually young age of 37. He was Head of the King's Department of Classics from 1972 to 1984, and Dean of its Faculty of Arts from 1976 to 1980. He then moved into leadership positions in the wider University of London, serving as Director of the Institute of Classical Studies from 1984 to 1991, and Dean of the Institute for Advanced Study from 1989 to 1991. He was "instrumental in setting up the University of London Institute for Advanced Study", a body which brought together the various research institutes of the university: it would go on to become the School of Advanced Study.

In 1991, Barron was elected the 7th Master of St Peter's College, Oxford. He would go on to serve two five-year terms and a two-year extension, before retiring in 2003. During his time as master, he increased the number of female students at his college from fewer than 30 percent to almost half. He also greatly expanded the physical footprint of the college, adding three new buildings. He also attempted to add the former Oxford Prison to the portfolio but this was vetoed by the college's governing body. He was also Chairman of the Conference of Colleges, the association of Oxford Colleges, from 1993 to 1995, and Chairman of the University of Oxford's Admissions Committee from 1997 to 2000. As the latter, he aimed to widen the university's intake, and encouraged an increase in the number of state educated students.

In retirement, he was an honorary fellow of St Peter's College, Oxford and a visiting professor at King's College, London.

== Personal life ==
In 1962, Barron married Caroline Mary Hogarth, a medieval historian. She is the granddaughter of David George Hogarth, a noted archaeologist and decorated naval intelligence officer. Together they had two daughters.

After a short time living with pancreatic cancer, Barron died on 16 August 2008 in London, England: he was aged 74.

== Selected works ==
- Barron, John P. (1965). Greek Sculpture. London: Studio Vista.
- Barron, J. P. (1966). Silver Coins of Samos. London: The Athlone Press. ISBN 978-0485110807.
- Barron, John (1981). An Introduction to Greek Sculpture. London: Athlone. ISBN 9780485111965.
- Barron, John Penrose (2017). From Samos to Soho: The Unorthodox Life of Joseph Georgirenes, a Greek Archbishop. Bern: Peter Lang. ISBN 9783034317887.
- Barron, John P. (2006). "Chapter 3: Archbishop Joseph Georgirenes and the Prehistory of the Greek College". In Doll, Peter M. (ed.). Anglicanism and Orthodoxy 300 Years after the 'Greek College' in Oxford. Oxford: Peter Lang. pp. 79–112. ISBN 9783039105809.

Academic offices
Preceded by Gerald Aylmer	Master of St Peter's College, Oxford; 1991 to 2003	Succeeded by Bernard Silverman
