= Percy Stow =

British director

- Born: Percival Edwin Stow; 1876; Islington, London, England
- Died: 10 July 1919 (aged 42-43); Torquay, Devon, England
- Occupation: Film director
- Known for: Co-founding Clarendon Film Company

The Tempest (1908)

Percy Stow (1876 – 10 July 1919) was a British director of short films. He was also the co-founder of Clarendon Film Company. He was born in Islington, London, England. He was previously associated with Cecil Hepworth from 1901 to 1903, where he specialized in trick films.

Percy Stow was an early partner of Cecil Hepworth, regarded as one of the founders of the British film industry. The Clarendon Film Company was founded in 1904 by H.V. Lawley and Percy. The company was formed at Limes Road and its distinctive logo carried the abbreviation CFC.

== Filmography ==
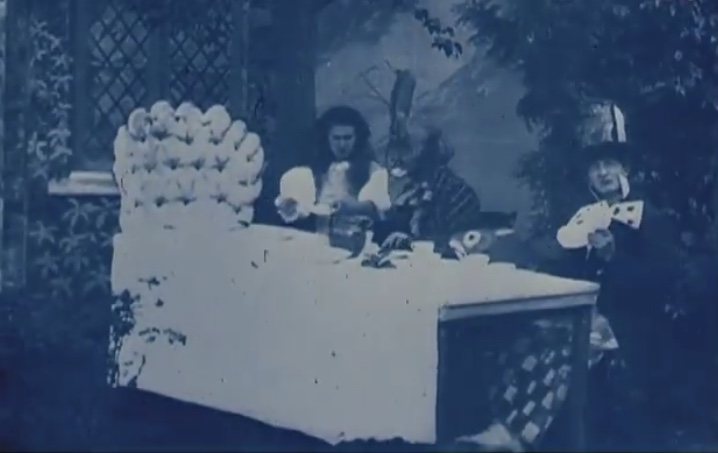
May Clark as Alice (left) and Norman Whitten (right) as the Mad Hatter in Alice in Wonderland (1903), the first film version of the story

Stow directed 293 short films including the first cinematic adaptation of Alice in Wonderland.

- 1902 How to Stop a Motor Car
- 1903 Alice in Wonderland
- 1903 The Unclean World
- 1904 The Mistletoe Bough
- 1905 Willie and Tim in the Motor Car
- 1906 Rescued in Mid-Air
- 1907 The Pied Piper of Hamelin
- 1908 A Wild Goose Chase
- 1908 The Tempest
- 1908 Robin Hood and His Merry Men
- 1909 A Glass of Goat's Milk
- 1909 The Invaders
- 1910 Lieutenant Rose and the Foreign Spy
- 1911 Lieutenant Rose and the Royal Visit
- 1911 Lieutenant Rose and the Stolen Code
- 1912 Lieutenant Rose and the Stolen Battleship
- 1913 Love and the Varsity
- 1913 Milling the Militants

== Death ==
Stow died 10 July 1919 at the age of 43 in Torquay, Devon, England.
