= Judith Buchanan =

British academic

- Buchanan in 2019
- Born: 1967 (age 58–59)
- Title: Master of St Peter's College, Oxford

Academic work
- Discipline: English Literature and film studies
- Sub-discipline: Early modern literature; Works of Shakespeare; Shakespeare on film
- Institutions: Worcester College, Oxford; University of York; St Peter's College, Oxford

Judith Ruth Buchanan (born 1967) is a British academic specialising in Shakespeare and film studies. Since October 2019, she has been Master of St Peter's College, Oxford. Since January 2023, she has been a Pro-Vice-Chancellor of the University of Oxford.

== Biography ==
In 1993-1994, during the course of her postgraduate studies in early modern literature specialising in Shakespeare in performance at the University of Oxford, Buchanan went as a Fulbright Scholar to study film in New York, United States. She was awarded her Oxford Doctor of Philosophy (DPhil) in 1997, and held the Wilkinson Research Fellowship at Worcester College Oxford until 2000. In 2000, she moved to the University of York as a lecturer in the Department of English. In 2011, she was made Professor of Film and Literature at York and Director of the Humanities Research Centre. In 2017, she was appointed Dean of the Faculty of Arts and Humanities.

In 2016, Buchanan wrote and presented the BBC Radio 4 documentary An Excellent Dumb Discourse: Shakespeare in Silence. For the 2018 British feature film release of Macbeth, she acted as co-adapter and Shakespeare advisor. She co-founded the York International Shakespeare Festival. Until 2019, she directed Silents Now.

In October 2019, Buchanan became Master of St Peter’s College Oxford. In January 2023, she was additionally made a Pro-Vice-Chancellor of the University of Oxford.

Between 2019 and 2022, she was a government appointment on the Marshall Aid Commemoration Commission. In 2022 she was made a Trustee of RADA (Royal Academy of Dramatic Art). She is a member of the Oxford English Faculty and an Honorary Fellow of Worcester College Oxford.

== Selected works ==
- Buchanan, Judith (2005). Shakespeare on film. London: Pearson Longman. ISBN 978-0582437166.
- Buchanan, Judith (2009). Shakespeare on silent film: an excellent dumb discourse. Cambridge University Press. ISBN 978-0-521-87199-0.
- Buchanan, Judith (ed) (2013), The Writer on Film: Screening Literary Authorship. Palgrave. ISBN 978-0230313842.
- Film Institute DVD Play On!, with voice-over commentaries by Judith Buchanan (2016)

Academic offices
Preceded by Mark Damazer	Master of St Peter's College, Oxford; 2019 to present	Incumbent
