= Clarendon Film Company =

British film studio

The Clarendon Film Company was a British film studio founded by Percy Stow and Henry Vassal Lawley.

The studio was founded in 1904 in Croydon, primarily as a movie camera equipment company, and began to make short films as a side-line. It was named after its original location off Clarendon Road, and later moved to Limes Road. Among the films made by the company was The Tempest (1908), adapted for the screen by Langford Reed.

In 1909 it took part in the Paris Film Congress, a failed attempt by leading European producers to form a cartel similar to that of the MPPC in the United States.
