= Mark Wroe =

British Anglican bishop (born 1969)

The Right Reverend Mark Wroe
- Bishop of Berwick
- Church: Church of England
- Diocese: Diocese of Newcastle
- In office: 2021 to present
- Predecessor: Mark Tanner
- Previous post: Archdeacon of Northumberland (2018–2020)

Orders
- Ordination: 1996 (deacon); 1997 (priest)
- Consecration: 5 January 2021 by Stephen Cottrell

Personal details
- Born: 1969 (age 56–57)
- Denomination: Anglicanism
- Education: St Mary's Roman Catholic College, Strawberry Hill; Ridley Hall, Cambridge

Mark Wroe (born 1969) is a British Anglican bishop. Since 2021, he has served as Bishop of Berwick. Previously, from 2018 to 2020, he was Archdeacon of Northumberland — both in the Church of England's Diocese of Newcastle.

== Biography ==
Wroe studied theology, religious studies and classics at St Mary's Roman Catholic College Strawberry Hill (SIMMS) from 1989 to 1992 (now St Mary's University, Twickenham): the degrees were awarded by Surrey University. He trained for ordained ministry at Ridley Hall, Cambridge.

He was ordained in the Church of England as a deacon in 1996 and as a priest in 1997. He served his title at All Saints, Chilvers Coton with St Mary the Virgin in Nuneaton in Warwickshire between 1996 and 2000. He was then appointed priest-in-charge and subsequently vicar at St Alban's Church, Windy Nook in Tyne and Wear. From 2007 until 2018, he was priest-in-charge of St Barnabas and St Jude, and vicar of Holy Trinity, Jesmond in Newcastle. In 2017, he also became Area Dean of the Central Newcastle Deanery. In 2018, he became acting Archdeacon of Northumberland, being appointed to the position in 2019.

On 20 October 2020, it was announced that Wroe is to be consecrated a bishop in "early 2021", to serve as Bishop of Berwick, the suffragan bishop of the Diocese of Newcastle. He was duly consecrated on 5 January 2021, by Stephen Cottrell, Archbishop of York, at York Minster. On Christine Hardman's retirement, 30 November 2021, Wroe became acting diocesan Bishop of Newcastle (as sole suffragan bishop of the diocese). He stepped down as acting diocesan bishop when Helen-Ann Hartley was installed as the next Bishop of Newcastle on 22 April 2023.

Church of England titles
Preceded by Geoff Miller	Archdeacon of Northumberland; 2018–2021	Succeeded by Rachel Wood
