= Edgar Jacob =

English churchman (1844-1920)

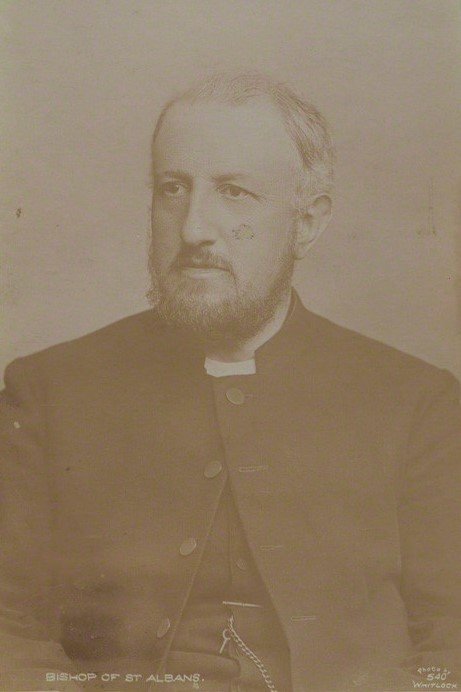
- Born: 16 November 1844; Crawley, Hampshire, England
- Died: 25 March 1920 (aged 75); Winchester, Hampshire, England
- Occupations: Bishop of Newcastle, Bishop of St Albans
- Years active: 1869-1919
- Relatives: Ven. Philip Jacob (father)

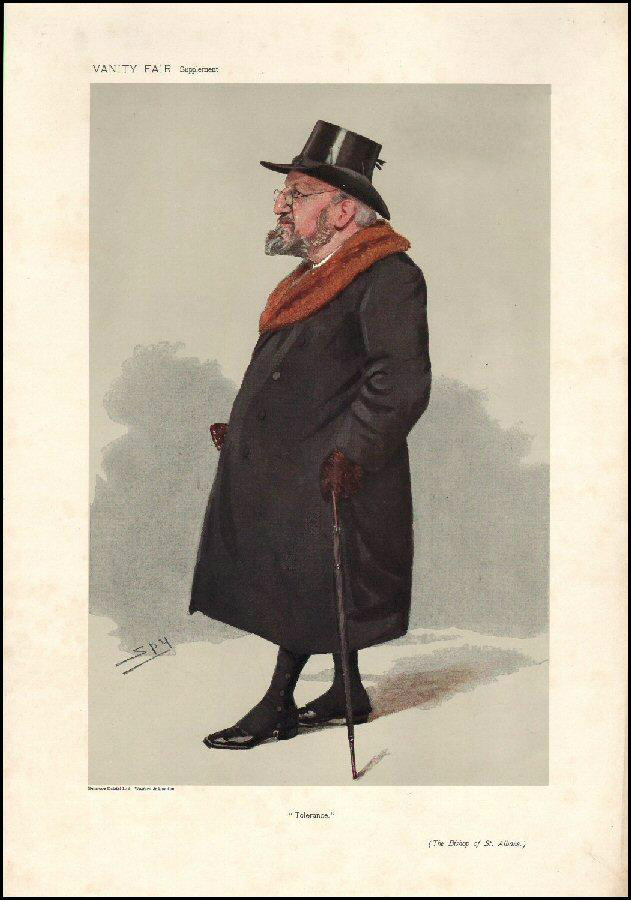
Vanity Fair caricature by Spy (Leslie Ward), 26 September 1906

Edgar Jacob (16 November 1844 – 25 March 1920) was an English churchman, who became Bishop of Newcastle and then Bishop of St Albans.

== Early life and education ==
He was born at the rectory in Crawley, Hampshire, on 16 November 1844. He was the fifth son of Philip Jacob, Rector of Crawley, Archdeacon of Winchester and Rural Dean, and Anna Sophia Noel, eldest daughter of Gerard Thomas Noel.

He was educated at Winchester College and at New College, Oxford, of which he was a scholar, matriculating in 1863. He obtained a first class in classical moderations in 1865 and a third class in literae humaniores in 1867, B.A. in 1868, M.A. in 1871, D.D. by diploma in 1895 and Hon. D.D. (Durham) in 1896.

== Clerical career ==
He was ordained priest in 1869 (Oxford) and went to be assistant curate of Witney from that year until 1871. His second curacy was at St James's Bermondsey from 1871 until he went to be domestic chaplain to Robert Milman, Bishop of Calcutta in 1872. In 1876, he ceased to be the bishop's chaplain and become Commissary of Calcutta until 1888.

Jacob returned to England in 1876, and became examining chaplain to the Bishop of Winchester (Harold Browne until 1891, Anthony Thorold 1891–1895 and finally Randall Davidson from 1896 onwards) for twenty years until 1896. He was Vicar of Portsea from 1878 until 1896, and additionally Honorary Canon of Winchester Cathedral starting in 1884. He was also Honorary Chaplain to Queen Victoria from 1887 until he became her Chaplain-in-Ordinary in 1890, and Rural Dean of Landport and Chaplain to HM Prison Kingston, Portsmouth from 1892. In 1895, he became rector of Hampshire and the Isle of Wight and select preacher at Oxford.

In 1896, all of these roles ended when he was nominated Bishop of Newcastle on 16 January and consecrated on 25 January 1896. In Newcastle he visited almost every parish, worked to endow the chapter of Newcastle Cathedral, and started a hostel for the preparation of candidates for holy orders, taking som part in their training himself. He was also active in the House of Lrds during the debates on the Education Act 1902. Bishop Edgar was nominated to become Bishop of St Albans in February 1902, transferred formally after election in May 1903, and consecrated the same month. He remained there until 1919. The latter diocese, which embraced a large part of the poorer outlying parts of London, was large for the effective control of one bishop, consisting as it did of 630 benefices and nearly 900 clergy, and Jacob worked hard to secure the formation of a new bishopric out of it. It was not, however, until 1913 that the bill providing for the erection of the bishopric of Chelmsford passed.

Jacob was a vocal supporter of British involvement in the Great War, and encouraged his clergy to be active in assisting the National War effort. Although he emphatically rejected the notion that clergy could serve as combatants, which many sought to do, his diocese provided many army and navy chaplains, and staff for other organisations.

In 1919, he summarised this commitment by his priests : 2 chaplains, (1 army and 1 RN) killed; 1 chaplain died of influenza; 48 other chaplains in Army and RN; 24 officiating clergy to troops in parish or nearby; 23 served with Church Army, YMCA, Red Cross, Royal Army Medical Corps.

He retired from his see in December 1919, and died at the Hospital of St Cross in Winchester, Hampshire, England.

Religious titles
Preceded by Ernest Wilberforce	Bishop of Newcastle; 1896–1903	Succeeded by Arthur Lloyd
Preceded by John Wogan Festing	Bishop of St Albans; 1903–1920	Succeeded by Michael Furse
