= Peter Forster (bishop) =

Former Church of England bishop (born 1950)

- Bishop of Chester
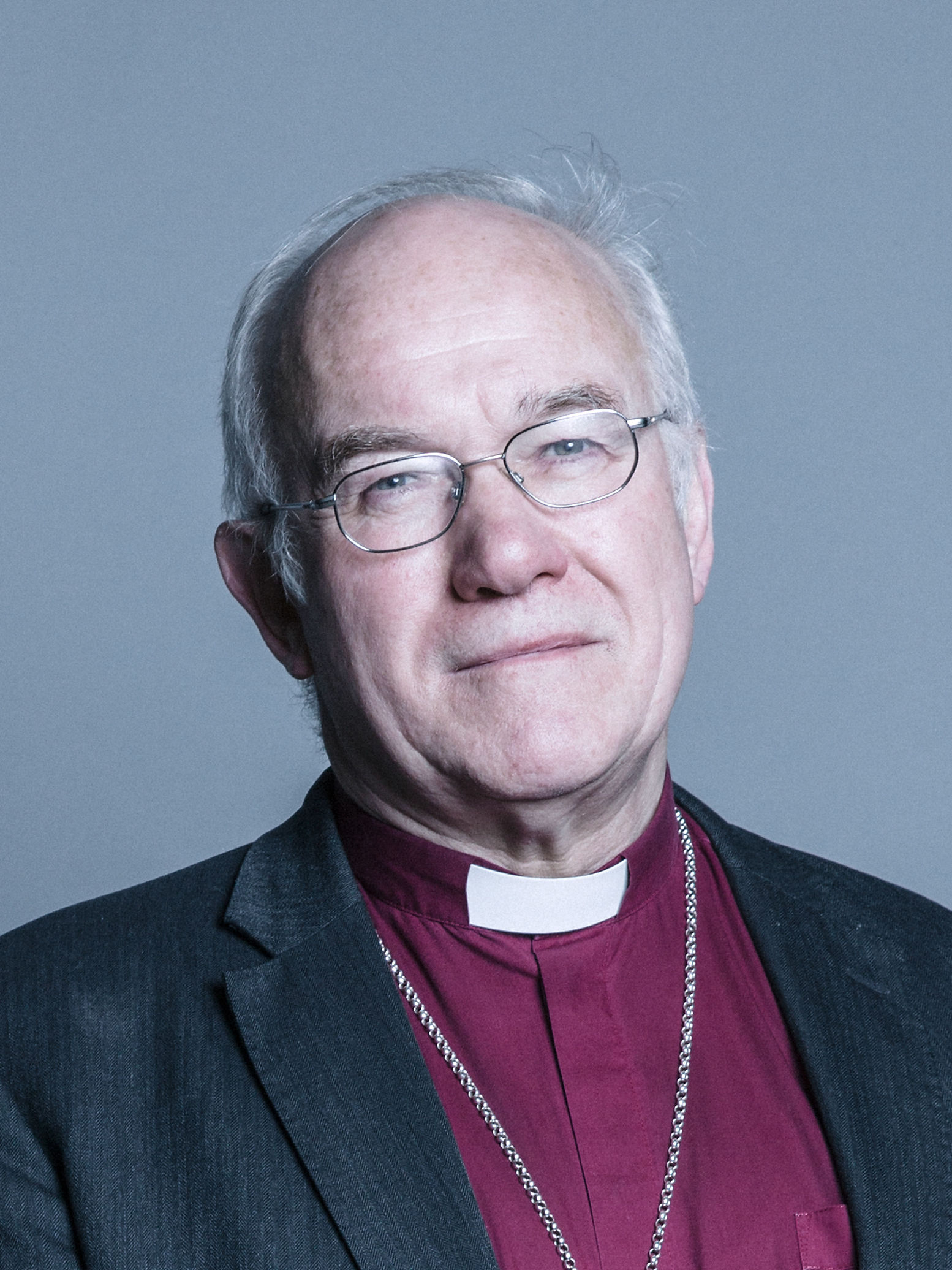
- Forster in 2018
- Church: Church of England
- Diocese: Chester
- In office: 1996–2019
- Predecessor: Michael Baughen
- Successor: Mark Tanner
- Other post: Vicar of Beverley Minster (1992–1996)

Orders
- Ordination: 1980 (Anglican deacon); 1981 (Anglican priest) by David Sheppard
- Consecration: 13 November 1996 (Anglican bishop) by David Hope
- Laicized: 2021

Personal details
- Born: 16 March 1950 (age 76) Solihull, Warwickshire, England
- Denomination: Roman Catholicism (from 2021); Anglicanism (until 2021)
- Parents: Thomas Forster; Edna Russell
- Spouse: Elisabeth Anne Stevenson (m. 1978)
- Children: 4
- Education: Merton College, Oxford; University of Edinburgh

Member of the House of Lords
- Lord Spiritual
- Bishop of Chester; 14 November 2001 – 30 September 2019

Peter Robert Forster (born 16 March 1950) is a British former Anglican bishop. He was Bishop of Chester in the Church of England from 1996 and a Lord Spiritual (member of the House of Lords) from 2001 until his retirement in 2019. He was received into the Roman Catholic Church in 2021.

== Early life and education ==
Born in Solihull, the son of Thomas Forster by his marriage to Edna Russell, Forster was educated at the town's Tudor Grange Grammar School. He stated in the House of Lords on 8 February 2016 that he had spent his gap year making Land Rover Defenders and was auto-enrolled into the TGWU. He studied at Merton College, Oxford, where he graduated with a Bachelor of Arts (BA) in chemistry, promoted to Master of Arts (MA Oxon) in 1973. At the University of Edinburgh, he graduated as a Bachelor of Divinity (BD) in theology in 1977 and as a Doctor of Philosophy in 1985.

== Ordained ministry ==
Forster was ordained a deacon at Petertide (29 June) in 1980 and a priest the next Petertide (12 July 1981), both times by David Sheppard, Bishop of Liverpool, at Liverpool Cathedral. From 1980 to 1982, he was assistant curate of the Mossley Hill Parish Church in Liverpool. He was senior tutor at St John's College, Durham, from 1983 to 1991 and became the vicar of Beverley Minster in 1992.

=== Episcopal ministry ===
In 1996, Forster was appointed the 40th bishop of Chester. He was consecrated a bishop (alongside John Packer, Bishop of Warrington and later Bishop of Ripon and Leeds) during a service at York Minster, by David Hope, Archbishop of York, on 13 November 1996. He was enthroned on 11 January 1997 and in 2001 took his seat as a Lord Spiritual in the House of Lords.

From 1997 to 2005, Forster was the chair of the board of governors of University College, Chester, which was recognised by the University of Liverpool for the awarding of degrees. In 2005 he oversaw the emergence of the University of Chester, with full power to award its own degrees. From 2005 to 2019 he was president of the council of the university. On retirement, the university awarded him the degree of Doctor of Divinity.

In 2000, Forster represented the Church of England at the world-wide synod of Roman Catholic bishops, held in Rome in the month of October.

From 2001 to 2010 he was a member of the English Anglican–Roman Catholic Committee.

In 2003, Forster raised controversy when answering a journalist's question by stating that homosexual people could "reorientate themselves" with the help of psychiatrists. The police were satisfied that no offence had been committed.

In 2004, Forster was appointed as president of the (now Royal) Cheshire Show, the first bishop to receive this honour.

He was one of nine bishops who signed a letter disagreeing with the decision of Rowan Williams, Archbishop of Canterbury, not to block the appointment of Jeffrey John as Bishop of Reading in 2003.

In 2012, amid controversy over the amount of expenses claimed by bishops for attending the House of Lords, it was revealed that Forster had claimed more than any other bishop in 2010/11. In that year he was a member of two select committees. He had claimed £34,909 for travel and accommodation, and had attended on 97 days.

In 2013, Forster led the Church of England delegation to the 10th Assembly of the World Council of Churches, held in Busan, South Korea.

During his years as a member of the House of Lords, from 2001 to 2019, Forster initiated major debates on marriage, children and family life, and on the impact of pornography on society, as well as speaking on a wide range of topics.

In March 2019, he called for Parliament to agree to Theresa May's Brexit deal during a debate in the House of Lords.

In March 2019, Forster faced controversy following a child sex abuse scandal in the diocese. A priest who had been accused of sex offences 35 years earlier, wrote confidentially about the allegations in a letter to the bishop in 2009. The allegations had been fully disclosed to the church authorities in 1974. The letter came to light during a police investigation in 2017 of a previous Bishop of Chester, Victor Whitsey, who has been named in abuse cases as a paedophile. There was a Church Disciplinary Measure (CDM) process against Forster, and while this was considered he agreed to delegate his safeguarding responsibilities to the suffragan Bishop of Birkenhead. The bishop stated that he acted reasonably, and in accordance with the policy guidance which applied in 2009, and vigorously contested the allegation. It was decided that he had no case to answer. An independent report into the church's handling of the Whitsey allegations was published in October 2020.

In April 2019, Forster announced that he would retire on 30 September 2019. In retirement he moved to the Scottish Borders, to a house which he and his son had built over the preceding dozen years. He had previously, in the 1980s, built a house in East Lothian with his father-in-law, Eric Stevenson, an Edinburgh architect.

== Roman Catholic Church ==
Forster was received into the Roman Catholic Church in 2021. Reports of his reception were widespread, but no mention was made of plans to ordain him to the Catholic priesthood or any prospective ministry for him in the Catholic Church.

== Personal life ==
Forster married Elisabeth Anne Stevenson in 1978, and they have four children. His brother-in-law, Kenneth Stevenson, was also an Anglican bishop.

== Styles ==
- The Reverend Peter Forster (1980–1985)
- The Reverend Dr Peter Forster (1985–1996)
- The Right Reverend Doctor Peter Forster (1996–2021)
- Dr Peter Forster (2021–present)

Church of England titles
Preceded by Michael Baughen	Bishop of Chester; 1996–2019	Mark Tanner
