= Mark Tanner =

British Anglican bishop and academic (born 1970)

The Right Reverend Mark Tanner
- Bishop of Chester
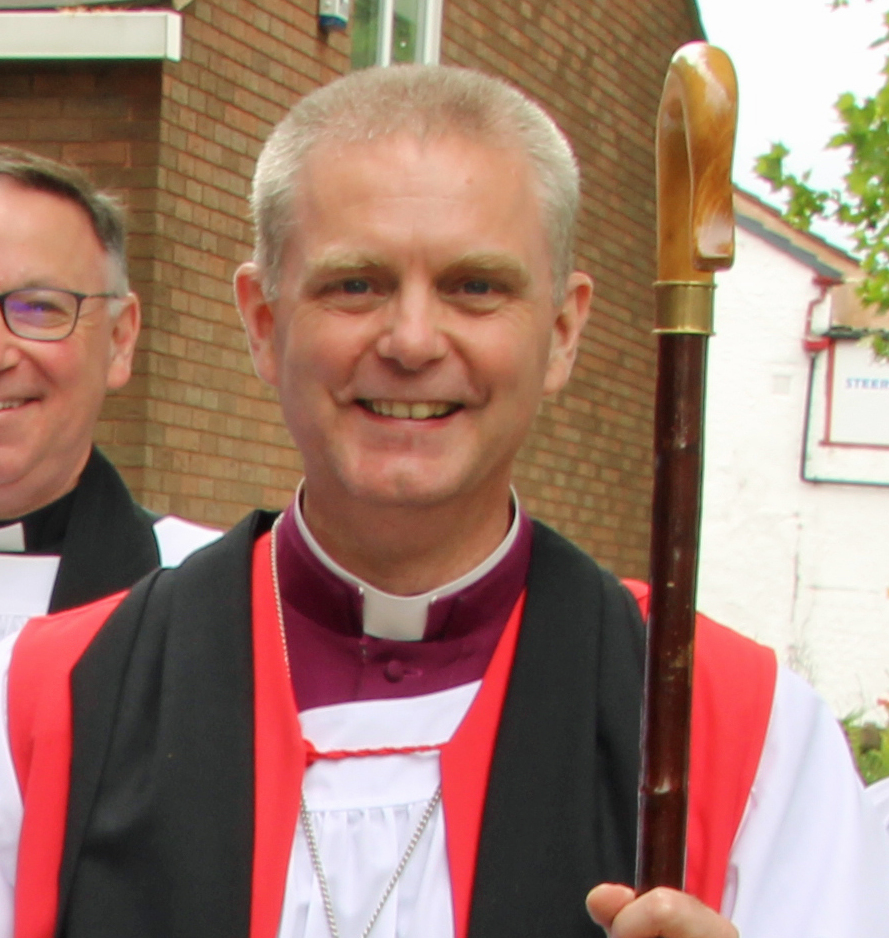
- Tanner in 2023
- Church: Church of England
- Diocese: Diocese of Chester
- In office: 2020–present
- Predecessor: Peter Forster
- Other posts: Warden of Cranmer Hall, Durham (2011–2016); Bishop of Berwick (2016–2020)

Orders
- Ordination: 1998 (deacon); 1999 (priest)
- Consecration: 18 October 2016 by John Sentamu

Personal details
- Born: Mark Simon Austin Tanner; November 1970 (age 55) Canada
- Denomination: Anglicanism
- Spouse: Lindsay (m. 1994)
- Children: Two
- Education: Loughborough Grammar School
- Alma mater: Christ Church, Oxford; Cranmer Hall, Durham; St John's College, Durham; University of Liverpool

Member of the House of Lords
- Lord Spiritual
- Bishop of Chester; 17 July 2025

Mark Simon Austin Tanner (born November 1970) is a British Anglican bishop and academic. Since 2020, he has been the Bishop of Chester; he previously served as Bishop of Berwick, a suffragan bishop in the Diocese of Newcastle since his 2016 consecration as bishop; and from August 2011 until his consecration, he was the Warden of Cranmer Hall, Durham, a Church of England theological college.

== Early life and education ==
Tanner was born in November 1970 in Canada to Professor Stuart Tanner and Joy Tanner. He was educated at Loughborough Grammar School, an all-boys private school in Loughborough, Leicestershire, England. He studied at Christ Church, Oxford, graduating with a Bachelor of Arts (BA) degree in 1992; as per tradition, his BA was promoted to an Oxford Master of Arts (MA Oxon) degree in 1997.

From 1992 to 1995, Tanner was a youth pastor at Holy Trinity Church, Coventry, West Midlands. In 1995, he matriculated into Cranmer Hall, Durham, an Anglican theological college, to train for ordained ministry. During this time, he also studied theology at St John's College, Durham, and graduated with a further BA degree in 1998. He later undertook postgraduate study at the University of Liverpool, and was awarded a Master of Theology (MTh) degree in 2005.

== Ordained ministry ==
Tanner was ordained in the Church of England as a deacon in 1998, and as a priest on 3 July 1999 by Michael Langrish, Bishop of Birkenhead. From 1998 to 2001, he served his curacy at St Mary's Church, Upton, Merseyside in the Diocese of Chester. He then moved to the Diocese of Sheffield, and served as the vicar of St Mary's Church, Doncaster from 2001 to 2007.

In 2007, Tanner moved to the Diocese of Ripon and Leeds. He was vicar of Holy Trinity Church, Ripon from 2007 to 2011. He also held a number of positions in addition to his parish ministry. He was area dean of Ripon from 2009 to 2011. Since 2009, he has been an officiating chaplain to the military (OCM), a type of part-time military chaplain who remains a civilian, and served as OCM to 21 Engineer Regiment from 2009 to 2011.

In August 2011, Tanner became warden of Cranmer Hall, Durham, a Church of England theological college in the Open Evangelical tradition. He also served as OCM to 101st (Northumbrian) Regiment Royal Artillery from 2011 to 2013. In 2015, he was made an honorary canon of Durham Cathedral. During his five years at Cranmer Hall, he doubled the number of ordinands training there and oversaw the establishment of a training track for ministers from the free church, including those training for Baptist ordination.

=== Episcopal ministry ===
On 1 September 2016, it was announced that Tanner would become the next Bishop of Berwick, the suffragan bishop of the Diocese of Newcastle. On 18 October 2016, he was consecrated a bishop by John Sentamu, Archbishop of York during a service at York Minster. He was welcomed into the Diocese of Newcastle at St Nicholas' Cathedral, Newcastle on 3 December and at St Aidan's Church, Bamburgh on 4 December.

On 12 May 2020, it was announced that Tanner would become the next Bishop of Chester, the Ordinary of the Diocese of Chester. The confirmation of his election as Bishop of Chester, by which he legally took office, took place on 15 July 2020: it was undertaken online due to the COVID-19 pandemic.

On 7 June 2024, he gave the sermon at the wedding of Hugh Grosvenor, 7th Duke of Westminster and Olivia Grace Henson.

On 19 June 2025, Tanner joined the House of Lords as one of the Lords Spiritual, following the retirement of Alan Smith, the Bishop of St Albans. He was introduced to the Lords on 17 July 2025.

=== Views ===
He abstained during a vote on introducing "standalone services for same-sex couples" on a trial basis during a meeting of the General Synod in November 2023; the motion passed.

== Personal life ==
Since 1994, Mark Tanner is married to Lindsay, who is licensed as a Reader in the Church of England. Together they have two children.

== Styles ==
- Mr Mark Tanner
- The Reverend Mark Tanner (1998–2015)
- The Reverend Canon Mark Tanner (2015–2016)
- The Right Reverend Mark Tanner (2016–present)

== Selected works ==
- Leach, John; Tanner, Mark; Witcombe, John (2002). Renewing the traditional church. Cambridge: Grove Books. ISBN 978-1851745135.
- Williams, Richard; Tanner, Mark (2004). Developing visionary leadership. Cambridge: Grove Books. ISBN 978-1851745678.
- Tanner, Mark (2007). How to write a good sermon: a working model. Cambridge: Grove Books. ISBN 978-1851746606.
- Tanner, Mark (2009). How to develop vision in the local church. Cambridge: Grove Books. ISBN 978-1851747191.
- Tanner, Mark (2009). How to preach a good sermon: a practical guide. Cambridge: Grove Books. ISBN 978-1851747382.
- Tanner, Mark (2015). The Introvert Charismatic: The Gift of Introversion in a Noisy Church. Oxford: Monarch Books. ISBN 978-0857215888.
- Tanner, Mark (2015). The PCC Member's Essential Guide. London: Church House Publishing. ISBN 978-0715110935.

Academic offices
| Preceded by Anne Dyer | Warden of Cranmer Hall, Durham; 2011–2016 | Succeeded by Philip Plyming |
Church of England titles
| Preceded by Frank White as Assistant Bishop of Newcastle | Bishop of Berwick; 2016–2020 | Succeeded by Mark Wroe (from 2021) |
| Preceded by Peter Forster | Bishop of Chester; 2020–present | Incumbent |
