= Ernest Wilberforce =

British Anglican clergyman and bishop

The Right Reverend Ernest Wilberforce
- Bishop of Chichester
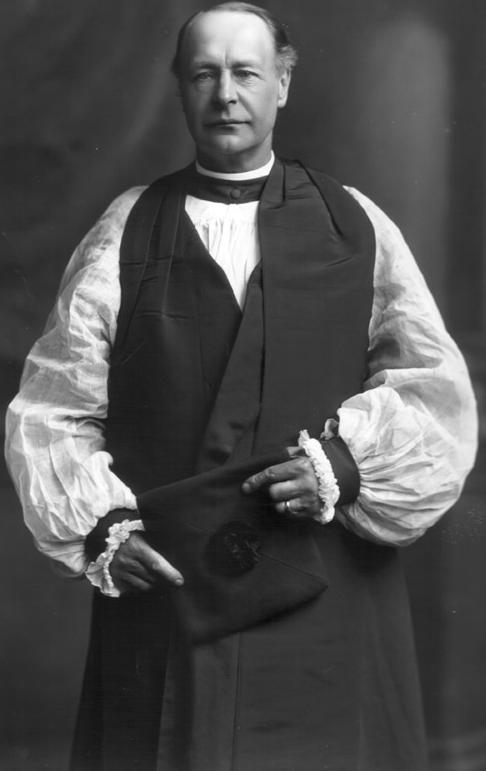
- Wilberforce in episcopal robes
- Church: Church of England
- Diocese: Chichester
- Installed: 1896
- Term ended: 1907
- Predecessor: Richard Durnford
- Successor: Charles Ridgeway
- Other post: Bishop of Newcastle (1882–1896)

Orders
- Ordination: 1864
- Consecration: 1882

Personal details
- Born: 22 January 1840 Brighstone, Isle of Wight, England
- Died: 9 September 1907 (aged 67) Bembridge, Isle of Wight, England
- Buried: West Hampnett, Chichester
- Denomination: Anglican
- Parents: Samuel Wilberforce & Emily Sargent
- Spouse: Frances Anderson (1863–70); Emily Connor (1874–1907)
- Children: 3 sons & 3 daughters (with Emily)
- Education: Exeter College, Oxford

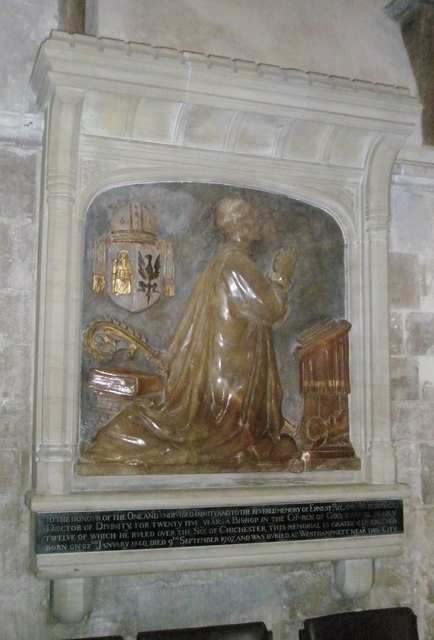
Monument in Chichester Cathedral, showing arms of the See of Chichester impaling Wilberforce (Argent, an eagle displayed sable beaked and membered proper)

Ernest Roland Wilberforce (22 January 1840 – 9 September 1907) was an Anglican clergyman and bishop. From 1882 to 1896 he was the first Anglican Bishop of Newcastle upon the diocese's creation, and from 1896 to 1907 he was Bishop of Chichester.

== Early life and career ==
The third son of another bishop, Samuel Wilberforce, and his wife, Emily Sargent (1807–1841) – as well as the grandson of William Wilberforce, leader of the movement to abolish the slave trade – Ernest, was born at his father's rectory, and grew up in Lavington and Cuddesdon, there gaining a love of country sports which lasted his whole life. Ernest's younger brother Basil became Archdeacon of Westminster. Ernest was educated at Harrow from 1854 to 1857, then for 2 years with a private tutor, then from May 1859 to 1862 at Exeter College, Oxford. He showed little academic merit at any of these and – better known as a good oarsman than a good scholar – graduated BA with fourth-class honours. During his time at Oxford he married Frances Mary, third daughter of Sir Charles Anderson, baronet (1804–1891) on 23 June 1863, and subsequently, his attitude to his work and life became more serious, proceeding MA in 1867 and going to train for the ministry at Cuddesdon College, then under Edward King.

His father ordained him deacon in December 1864 and priest in 1865 and, after short curacies at Cuddesdon itself and at Lea, was presented to living at Middleton Stoney, near Bicester, in 1868, though he had to resign from it two years later due to Frances' poor health (she died in October 1870 in San Remo of tuberculosis). In 1870 he became his father's domestic chaplain at Winchester, a year later sub-almoner to Queen Victoria, and in 1873 priest of Seaforth. This parish was traditionally evangelical and Ernest's moderate-high churchmanship could have led to friction with his parishioners, but his introduction of daily service and a weekly celebration of holy communion was tactful and such conflict was avoided, and it was in this parish that Ernest first became known for the power of his sermons and his voice. Also in Seaforth, he and his new wife (on 14 October 1874 Ernest had married a second time, to Emily, only daughter of George Henry Connor, later dean of Windsor – the couple had 3 sons and 3 daughters) became active supporters of the temperance movement, taking the pledge together in 1876.

== Bishop of Newcastle ==
In 1878 Wilberforce became a residentiary canon of Winchester and warden of the Wilberforce Mission (whose formation and endowment was a memorial to his father), with most of his activity for the latter occurring in Portsmouth and Aldershot (though in 1881 the mission was removed to the Diocese of Rochester via a legal ruling and Ernest left England for Quebec, on a brief missionary trip). On his return in 1882, he was awarded his BD and DD and William Ewart Gladstone offered Ernest the new see of Newcastle, which he accepted – he was nominated on 4 July – becoming the Church of England's youngest diocesan bishop on his consecration on 25 July that year.

It had taken four years between the act of Parliament that had formed the new diocese, and Ernest's appointment, to raise enough money to support a bishop, since the Church of England had only just taken interest in this industrial area and in its absence the dominant Christian force there had become the non-conformist churches (less than 4% of those in the 1881 census were recorded as attending Anglican services, a decline since 1851). Realising that this financial problem was his main impediment, Ernest raised nearly £250,000 in its first five years for his Bishop of Newcastle's, allowing 11 new churches and 7 new vicarages to be built and 28 new clergy to be employed in the city within 10 years. He also made long journeys across rural Northumberland for confirmations, confirming double the numbers in 1882–86 than had been confirmed 1878–1882 and making his presence felt right across the diocese. Even many nonconformists (after initial opposition) were won over by Ernest's tactful approach, and his Dictionary of National Biography entry compares his work there to W. F. Hook's work in Leeds in the previous generation.

== Bishop of Chichester ==
He was translated to Chichester on 16 January 1896, however, his health had been affected by his unflagging work in Newcastle, though there he found a number of ritualistic Anglican churches on the Sussex coast under fire from evangelicals from 1898 onwards. This culminated in a judgment from Lambeth against the use of incense and processional lights in 1899, with which Wilberforce persuaded five of the nine ritualist incumbents in Chichester diocese to comply. Attempting to protect the four others from prosecution and defending their work in the evidence he gave as a witness in front of the 1905 royal commission on ecclesiastical discipline (at which he also brought criticism to bear on what he saw as the evangelicals' prejudice and inaccurate claims), he tried to avoid the division and rancorousness he saw as results of the Public Worship Regulation Act 1874 and ensuing imprisonments and legal proceedings, despite having little personal investment in ritualism.

He was also still active in other areas, having his work for the temperance movement recognised in 1896 by becoming chairman of the Church of England Temperance Society and in 1904 (at the age of 64) joining the 'mission of help' to southern Africa (aimed at reconciliation after the South African War). Following a short illness Wilberforce died in 1907 on the Isle of Wight and was buried at Westhampnett, near Chichester, on 14 September. Emily survived him and died 17 July 1941.

Church of England titles
New diocese	Bishop of Newcastle; 1882–1896	Succeeded by Edgar Jacob
Preceded by Richard Durnford	Bishop of Chichester; 1896–1907	Succeeded by Charles Ridgeway
