= Bishop of Newcastle (England) =

Diocesan bishop in the Church of England

- Bishopric

anglican
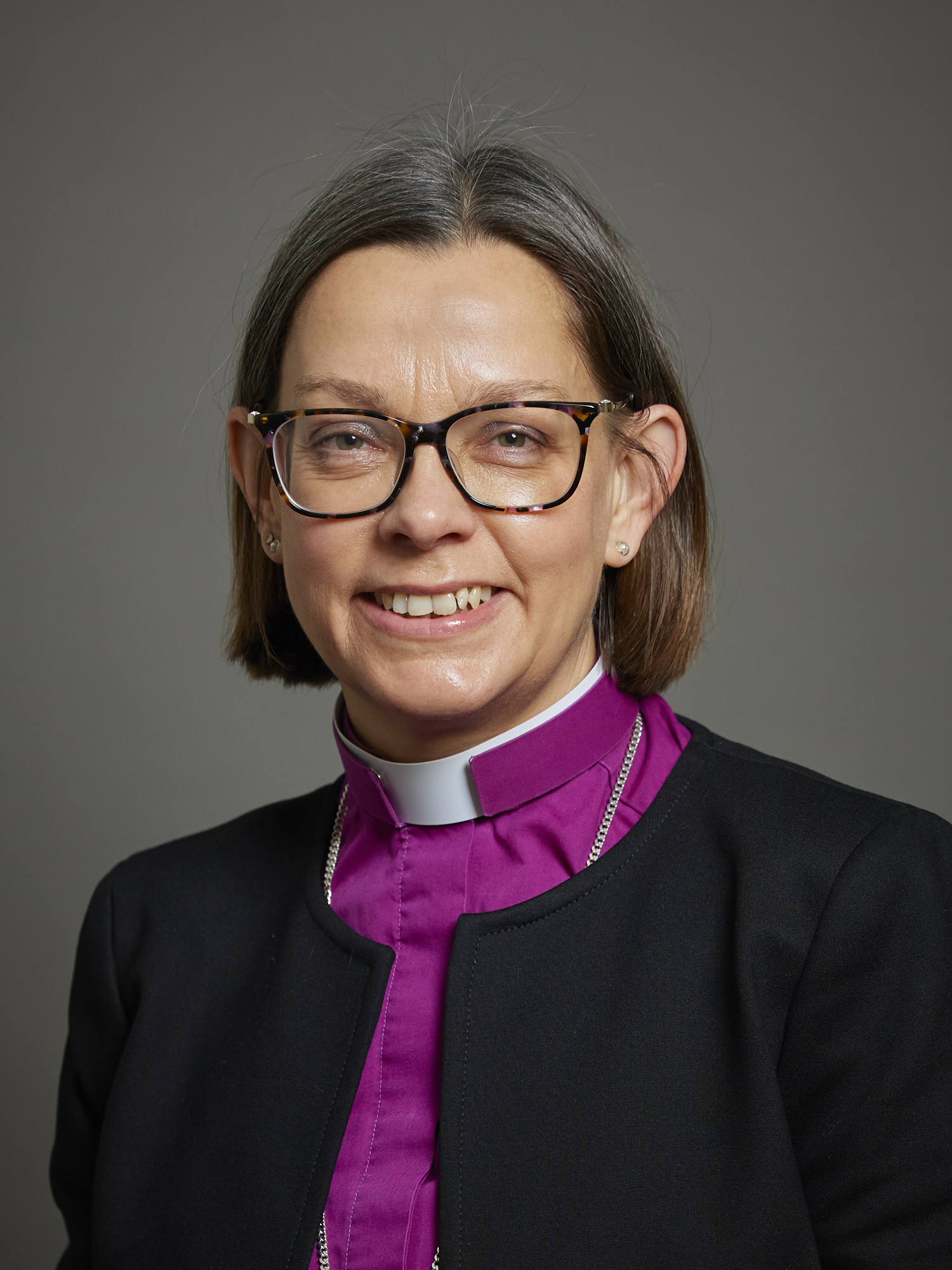
- Incumbent: Helen-Ann Hartley

Location
- Ecclesiastical province: York
- Residence: Bishop's House, Gosforth

Information
- First holder: Ernest Wilberforce
- Established: 1882
- Diocese: Newcastle
- Cathedral: Newcastle Cathedral

The Bishop of Newcastle is the ordinary of the Church of England's Diocese of Newcastle in the Province of York.

The diocese presently covers the County of Northumberland and the Alston Moor area of Cumbria. The see is in the city of Newcastle upon Tyne where the seat is located at the Cathedral Church of Saint Nicholas, a parish church elevated to cathedral status in 1882. The bishop's residence is Bishop's House, Gosforth — not far north of Newcastle city centre.

The office has existed since the founding of the diocese in 1882 under Queen Victoria by division of the diocese of Durham. Helen-Ann Hartley became diocesan Bishop of Newcastle on 3 February 2023, the confirmation of her election.

== List of bishops ==
Bishops of Newcastle
From	Until	Incumbent	Notes
1882	1896	Ernest Wilberforce	Translated to Chichester.
1896	1903	Edgar Jacob	Translated to St Albans.
1903	1907	Arthur Lloyd	Translated from Thetford.
1907	1915	Norman Straton	Translated from Sodor and Man.
1915	1927	Herbert Wild	
1927	1941	Harold Bilbrough	Translated from Dover.
1941	1957	Noel Hudson	Previously Bishop of Labuan and Sarawak then assistant bishop of St Albans; translated to Ely.
1957	1972	Hugh Ashdown	
1973	1980	Ronald Bowlby	Translated to Southwark.
1981	1997	Alec Graham	Translated from Bedford.
1997	2014	Martin Wharton	Translated from Kingston-upon-Thames.
2014	2015	Frank White	Acting bishop, as Assistant Bishop of Newcastle
2015	2021	Christine Hardman	Retired 30 November 2021.
2021	2023	Mark Wroe; Bishop of Berwick	Acting bishop, as Bishop of Berwick.
2023	present	Helen-Ann Hartley	Elected 28 November 2022; confirmed 3 February 2023.

== Assistant bishops ==
Among those others who have served the diocese as assistant bishops have been:

- 1924 – 1933 (res.): Cecil Wood, Vicar of Jesmond and former Bishop of Melanesia
- Anthony Hunter resigned as assistant bishop effective 1 September 1980.
