= Helen-Ann Hartley =

British Anglican bishop academic and Lord Spiritual (born 1973)

The Right Reverend Dr Helen-Ann Hartley
- Bishop of Newcastle
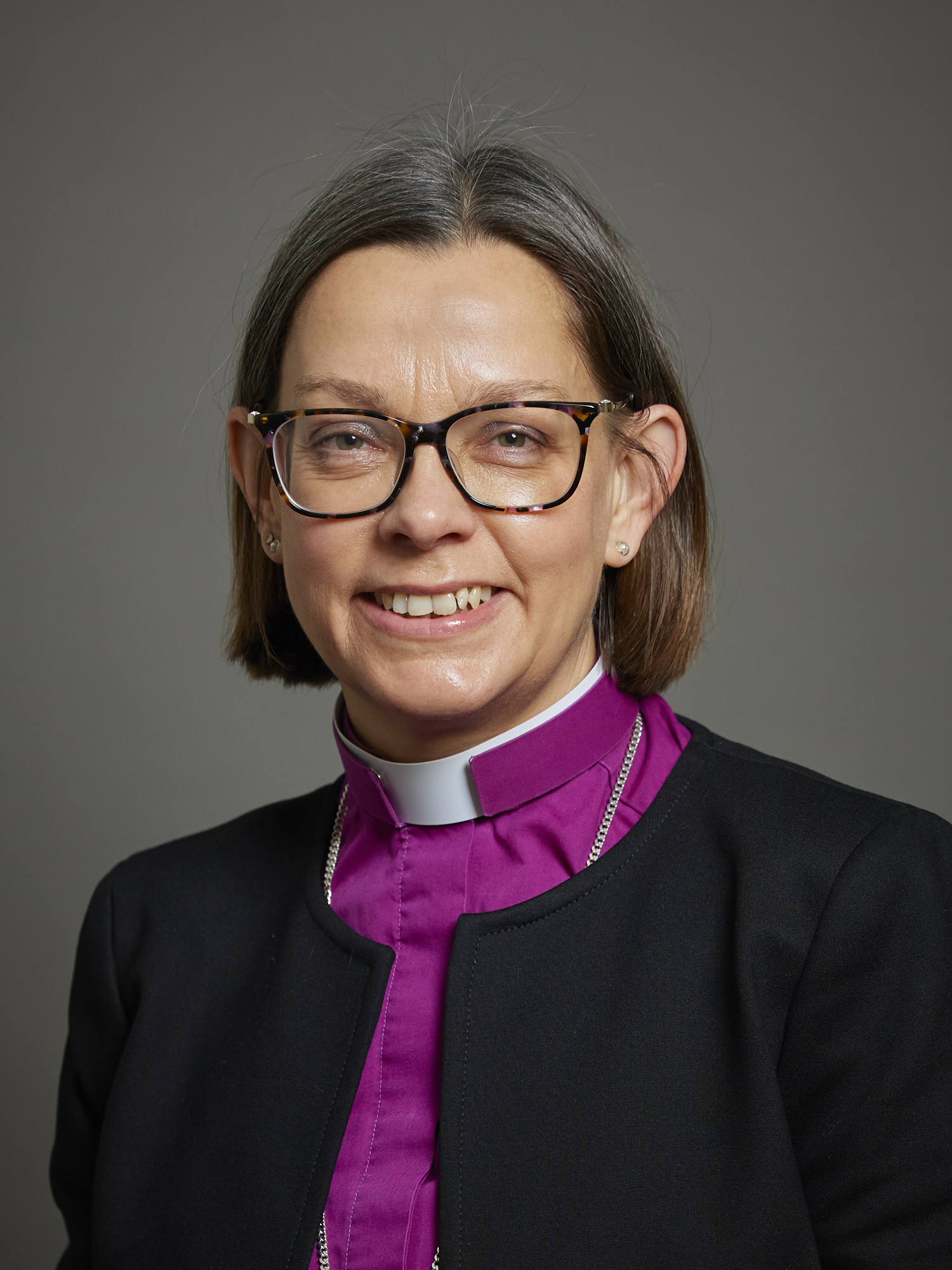
- Hartley in 2024
- Church: Church of England
- Diocese: Newcastle
- Installed: 3 February 2023
- Predecessor: Christine Hardman
- Previous posts: Bishop of Ripon (2018–2023); Bishop of Waikato (2014–2017)

Orders
- Ordination: 2005 (deacon); 2006 (priest)
- Consecration: 22 February 2014 by Philip Richardson

Personal details
- Born: Helen-Ann Macleod Francis; 28 May 1973 (age 53) Edinburgh, United Kingdom
- Denomination: Anglican
- Spouse: Myles Hartley
- Profession: Bishop and academic

Member of the House of Lords
- Lord Spiritual
- Bishop of Newcastle; 26 October 2023

Helen-Ann Macleod Hartley (née Francis; born 28 May 1973) is a British Anglican diocesan bishop, Lord Spiritual, and academic. Since 2023, she has served as the 13th Bishop of Newcastle in the Church of England. She previously served as Bishop of Waikato in New Zealand from 2014 to 2017, and area Bishop of Ripon in the Diocese of Leeds from 2018 to 2023. She was the first woman to have trained as a priest in the Church of England to join the episcopate, and the third woman to become a bishop of the Anglican Church in Aotearoa, New Zealand and Polynesia. At the times of her appointments to Leeds and Newcastle she was respectively the youngest bishop and youngest diocesan bishop in the Church of England. She has repeatedly criticised senior bishops on matters related to safeguarding and power dynamics.

== Early life and education ==
Hartley was born Helen-Ann Francis on 28 May 1973 in Edinburgh, Scotland. She was baptised Presbyterian in Coldingham Priory, Coldingham, Berwickshire, where her father was the minister. She spent her childhood in Sunderland, England. Her father was a Presbyterian Church of Scotland minister but the family moved to Anglicanism in the 1980s. In 1987, her father became a Church of England priest and served in the Diocese of Durham; he was later made an honorary canon of Durham Cathedral; and Helen-Ann's mother also later became a priest. Francis was educated in Sunderland at Benedict Biscop Primary School (a Church of England primary school) and St Anthony’s Secondary School (an all-girls Roman Catholic secondary school; now St Anthony's Girls' Catholic Academy) before attending university.

She has attended a number of universities where she studied theology. She graduated from the University of St Andrews with an undergraduate Master of Theology (MTheol) degree in 1995, and from Princeton Theological Seminary (PTS) with a Master of Theology (MTh) degree in 1996. PTS is a seminary associated with the Presbyterian Church (USA). Later, she studied at Worcester College, Oxford, and graduated from the University of Oxford with a Postgraduate Diploma (PGDip) in applied theology, a Master of Philosophy (MPhil) degree in 2000, and a Doctor of Philosophy (DPhil) degree in 2005. Her DPhil thesis concerned the portrayal of manual labour in Judaism and Early Christianity, and was titled "We worked night and day that we might not burden any of you (1 Thessalonians 2:9): aspects of the portrayal of work in the Letters of Paul, late Second Temple Judaism, the Græco-Roman world and early Christianity".

== Ordained ministry ==
Hartley is a fourth-generation cleric. She was an acolyte at Durham Cathedral during her youth. She attended the Oxford Ministry Course at Ripon College Cuddesdon to undergo ministerial formation.

Hartley was ordained in the Church of England: made a deacon at Michaelmas 2005 (24 September), by Richard Harries, Bishop of Oxford, at Christ Church Cathedral, Oxford, and ordained priest the Michaelmas following (24 September 2006), by Colin Fletcher, Bishop of Dorchester, at Dorchester Abbey. She then began her ministry as a curate in a group of parishes in Wheatley, Oxfordshire. In 2007, she became curate at St Mary and St Nicholas Church, Littlemore. In addition to serving as a curate, she worked as a lecturer in New Testament studies at Ripon College Cuddesdon. She later became the theological college's Director of Biblical Studies.

In November 2011, Hartley was selected to become Dean of Tikanga Pakeha, i.e. European heritage, students at St John's College, Auckland in New Zealand. The college is co-deputised by three deans who represent the three main peoples of New Zealand: Pakeha, Maori and Polynesians. She originally went to St John's College in 2010 to research for a book, Making Sense of the Bible, before moving to New Zealand to take up the appointment of Dean in early 2012.

== Consecrated ministry ==
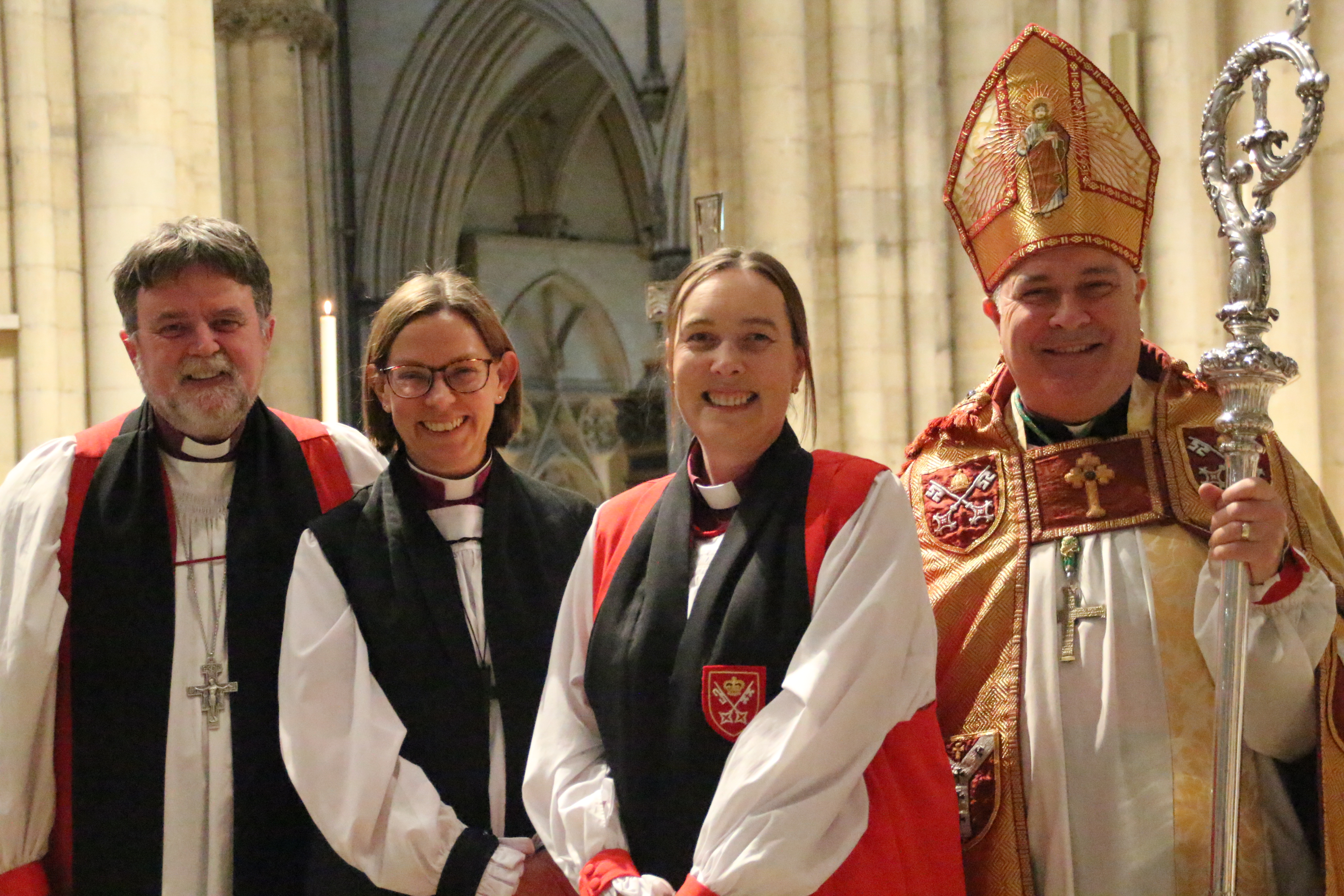
L to R: Philip Richardson, Archbishop of New Zealand; Helen-Ann Hartley; Eleanor Sanderson, Bishop of Hull; Stephen Cottrell, Archbishop of York

In September 2013, at the age of 40, Hartley was elected to become the seventh Bishop of Waikato in the Anglican Church in Aotearoa, New Zealand and Polynesia. She was consecrated on 22 February 2014, by Philip Richardson, Archbishop of New Zealand (with co-primates Brown Turei, Te Pīhopa o Aotearoa, and Winston Halapua, Bishop of Polynesia, and other bishops) at St Peter's Cathedral, Hamilton (i.e. Waikato's cathedral). She was the first woman who had trained and served as a priest in the Church of England to become a bishop: at the time of her election, women couldn't be consecrated to the episcopate of the Church of England. The Diocese of Waikato and Taranaki is unique within the Anglican Communion as it is led by co-diocesan bishops: Hartley and Philip Richardson, as Bishop of Taranaki, had joint oversight of the whole diocese.

On 9 November 2017, it was announced that Hartley was to become the Bishop of Ripon, an area bishop in the Church of England Diocese of Leeds. She was duly invested (i.e. legally took the See of Ripon) and installed at Ripon Cathedral on 4 February 2018. She was the youngest bishop in the Church of England.

In October 2022, it was announced that Hartley would take up the post of Bishop of Newcastle in early 2023, succeeding Christine Hardman, who retired in November 2021. On 28 November 2022, she was elected by the College of Canons of Newcastle Cathedral. The confirmation of her election — by which she legally took up the See of Newcastle — took place on 3 February 2023 at York Minster. On 22 April 2023, the service of inauguration was held at Newcastle Cathedral. She became the youngest Diocesan bishop in the Church of England.

On 21 September 2023, Hartley was admitted to the House of Lords as a Lord Spiritual. She was introduced to the House on 26 October 2023, and made her maiden speech on 14 November 2023 during a debate of the King's Speech.

In November 2023, Hartley became one of the co-lead bishops for the Living in Love and Faith (LLF) process involving the introduction of "Prayers of Love and Faith" along with Martyn Snow, Bishop of Leicester. Hartley stepped down from this role in February 2024 after what she called "serious concerns" over the appointment for six months of Reverend Dr Thomas Woolford as interim theological adviser to the House of Bishops; she said that Woolford's appointment was having "a critically negative impact on the work Bishop Martyn and [she] were seeking, in good faith, to do" and that being co-lead bishop for the LLF process was "now undermining [her] capacity to fulfil [her] primary calling, to lead and care for the people and places of the diocese of Newcastle". Woolford had in 2019 written an article for the conservative Church Society organisation in which he criticised the potential for the LLF process to lead to the blessing of same-sex unions, with said article beginning to be circulated on social media following his appointment as interim theological adviser. He had asked for the article to be taken down.

In May 2023, Hartley suspended honorary assistant bishop Lord Sentamu's permission to officiate in Newcastle Diocese because his statement about a review that found that he had failed to act on a disclosure of abuse when he had been Archbishop of York was "inconsistent with the tone and culture I expect around safeguarding in Newcastle".

In November 2024, Hartley alleged that she had "experienced as coercive language" text from Archbishops Justin Welby and Stephen Cottrell, in a letter requesting her to reinstate Lord Sentamu's permission to officiate. Hartley criticised the letter for reflecting a lack of awareness of power dynamics within the Church. The letter was sent on 31 October 2024, shortly before the Makin review was released, which highlighted ongoing issues in the Church’s approach to safeguarding. Hartley said publishing the letter was essential to expose these systemic problems.

Following publication of the Makin review, she was the only bishop to call publicly for Welby's resignation as Archbishop of Canterbury.

In the Church Times, Andrew Brown wrote that he had "never seen a more overt campaign for the job of Archbishop of Canterbury than that of the Bishop of Newcastle, Dr Helen-Ann Hartley", describing a long interview she had given to The Times promoting herself. He wrote: "[I]f Dr Hartley were a football manager, we'd say that she'd lost the robing room." Writing in The Independent, Peter Stanford also appeared to see her as a likely candidate for the post, saying: "If anyone can still save the Church of England and fill that void in leadership, it is surely her."

== Personal life ==
In 2003, Helen-Ann Francis married Myles Hartley, a musician and church organist.

After the felling of the Sycamore Gap tree, Hartley said she had spent a few days running around Hadrian's Wall shortly before becoming the Bishop of Newcastle in 2023. Hartley was appointed president of the Rural Coalition in 2025, replacing the first president, Alan Smith, Bishop of St Albans.

== Selected works ==
- Making Sense of the Bible: Atonement and Redemption. SPCK. 2011. ISBN 978-0-281-06405-2.
- Thinking About the Bible. National Book Network. 2015. ISBN 978-1-5064-0101-0.
- We worked night and day that we might not burden any of you (1 Thessalonians 2:9) (DPhil). Oxford University. 2005.

Anglican Communion titles
Preceded by David Moxon	Bishop of Waikato; 2014–2017	Succeeded by Philip Richardson as Bishop of Waikato and Taranaki
Church of England titles
Preceded by James Bell	Bishop of Ripon; 2018–2023	Succeeded by Anna Eltringham
Preceded by Christine Hardman	Bishop of Newcastle; 2023–present	Incumbent
