= St Mary's, High Church =

Coordinates: 55°09′35″N 1°41′32″W

St Mary's
- St Mary the Virgin
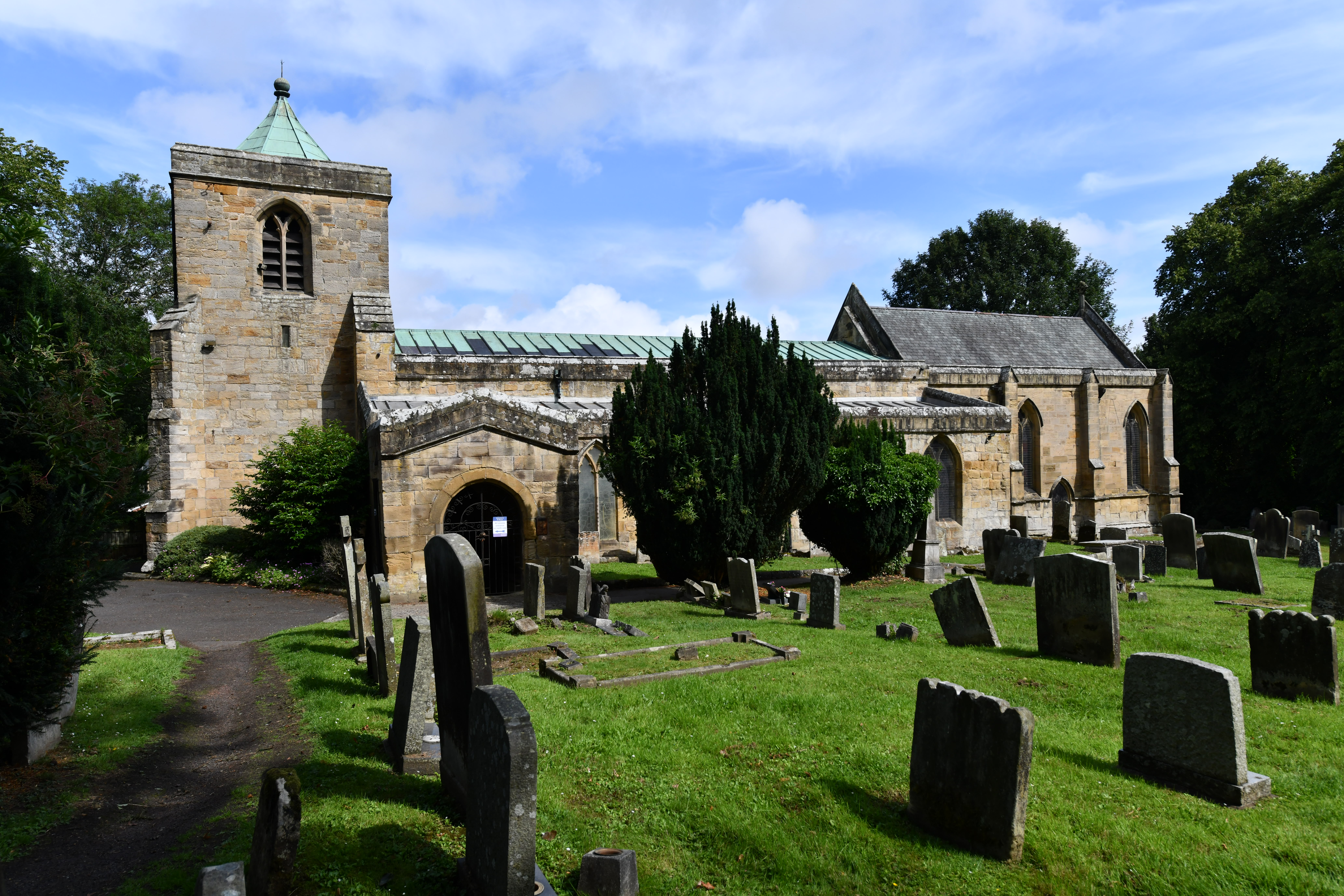
- St Mary's
- OS grid reference: NZ 19711 85088
- Location: Morpeth, Northumberland NE61 2QF
- Country: England
- Denomination: Church of England
- Website: www.parishofmorpeth.org.uk/stmary.htm

Architecture
- Functional status: Active
- Style: 14th century

Administration
- Diocese: Diocese of Newcastle
- Archdeaconry: Lindisfarne
- Parish: Morpeth

St Mary's, also known as St Mary the Virgin, is an ancient Church of England parish church located in Morpeth, Northumberland. It is situated to the south of the River Wansbeck in Morpeth, in an area of Morpeth known as High Church. The oldest surviving parts of the structure belong to the Transitional Early English style of the mid- to late 12th century, but most of the church dates from the 14th century. The church, which was the main Anglican place of worship in the area until the 1840s, has been restored several times after being attacked by the Scandinavians, Scots and Cromwellians in the 10th and later centuries. It is Grade I listed on the National Heritage List for England.

The grave of Emily Davison, a suffragette who died in 1913 after being struck by King George V's horse during the Epsom Derby, lies in St Mary's graveyard. Her gravestone bears the slogan of the Women's Social and Political Union: "Deeds not words".
