= Hugh Ashdown =

Hugh Edward Ashdown (5 July 1904 – 26 December 1977) was an eminent Anglican clergyman in the mid 20th Century.

Ashdown was educated at St. John's School, Leatherhead, and Keble College, Oxford, his first post after ordination was as a curate at St Mary’s Portsea, Portsmouth. He was then a chaplain and lecturer at Lincoln Theological College and then the perpetual curate of St Aidan’s, West Hartlepool and after that Rector of Houghton-le-Spring. From 1948 he was the provost of Southwark Cathedral. After his nomination on 15 March, he was consecrated to the episcopate on 1 May 1957 as the 8th bishop of Newcastle, a post he held for 16 years until his 2 October 1972 retirement. He died on Boxing Day 1977.
