= Bishop of Berwick =

Suffragan bishop in the Church of England

The Bishop of Berwick is an episcopal title used by the suffragan bishop of the Church of England Diocese of Newcastle in the Province of York, England.

The title was originally created in 1537 in the Diocese of Durham, and takes its name from the town of Berwick-upon-Tweed in Northumberland. After the death of the only bishop in 1572, the title went into abeyance.

From 1980 until 2016, the Assistant Bishop of Newcastle was an episcopal title used by the sole stipendiary assistant bishop (effectively suffragan bishop) of the Diocese of Newcastle. The title took its name as the bishop who assists the diocesan Bishop of Newcastle.

On 28 November 2015, Frank White, Assistant Bishop of Newcastle (at the end of a vacancy in the See of Newcastle), presented a proposal to the Diocesan Synod of the Diocese of Newcastle (within which diocese Berwick now lies) to revive the abeyant Suffragan See of Berwick. The Dioceses Commission approved the petition to revive the See, the post was advertised in April 2016, and the appointment of Mark Tanner, Warden of Cranmer Hall, Durham, (part of St John's College, Durham) was announced on 1 September 2016; Tanner was translated to Chester on 15 July 2020.

On 20 October 2020, it was announced that the nomination of Mark Wroe, Archdeacon of Northumberland, as the third Bishop of Berwick had been approved by the Queen. He was consecrated at York Minster on 5 January 2021, with the service livestreamed due to strict restrictions on attendance because of the COVID-19 pandemic .

== List of bishops ==
Bishops of Berwick
From	Until	Incumbent	Notes
1537	1572	Thomas Sparke	Consecrated on 9 December 1537; died in 1572.
1572	2016	in abeyance	
Assistant Bishops of Newcastle
From	Until	Incumbent	Notes
1980	1998	Ken Gill	Formerly Bishop of the Central Karnataka Diocese of the Church of South India. Appointed stipendiary Assistant Bishop of Newcastle in 1980.
1998	2010	Paul Richardson	Formerly Bishop of Wangaratta in the Anglican Church of Australia. Resigned and joined the Roman Catholic Church
2010	2016	Frank White	Formerly suffragan Bishop of Brixworth.
Bishops of Berwick
1572	2016	in abeyance	
2016	2020	Mark Tanner	Consecrated on 18 October 2016; translated to Chester 15 July 2020.
2021	Incumbent	Mark Wroe	Consecrated on 5 January 2021.
