= Queen Elizabeth's School for Girls =

Queen Elizabeth's Girls' School
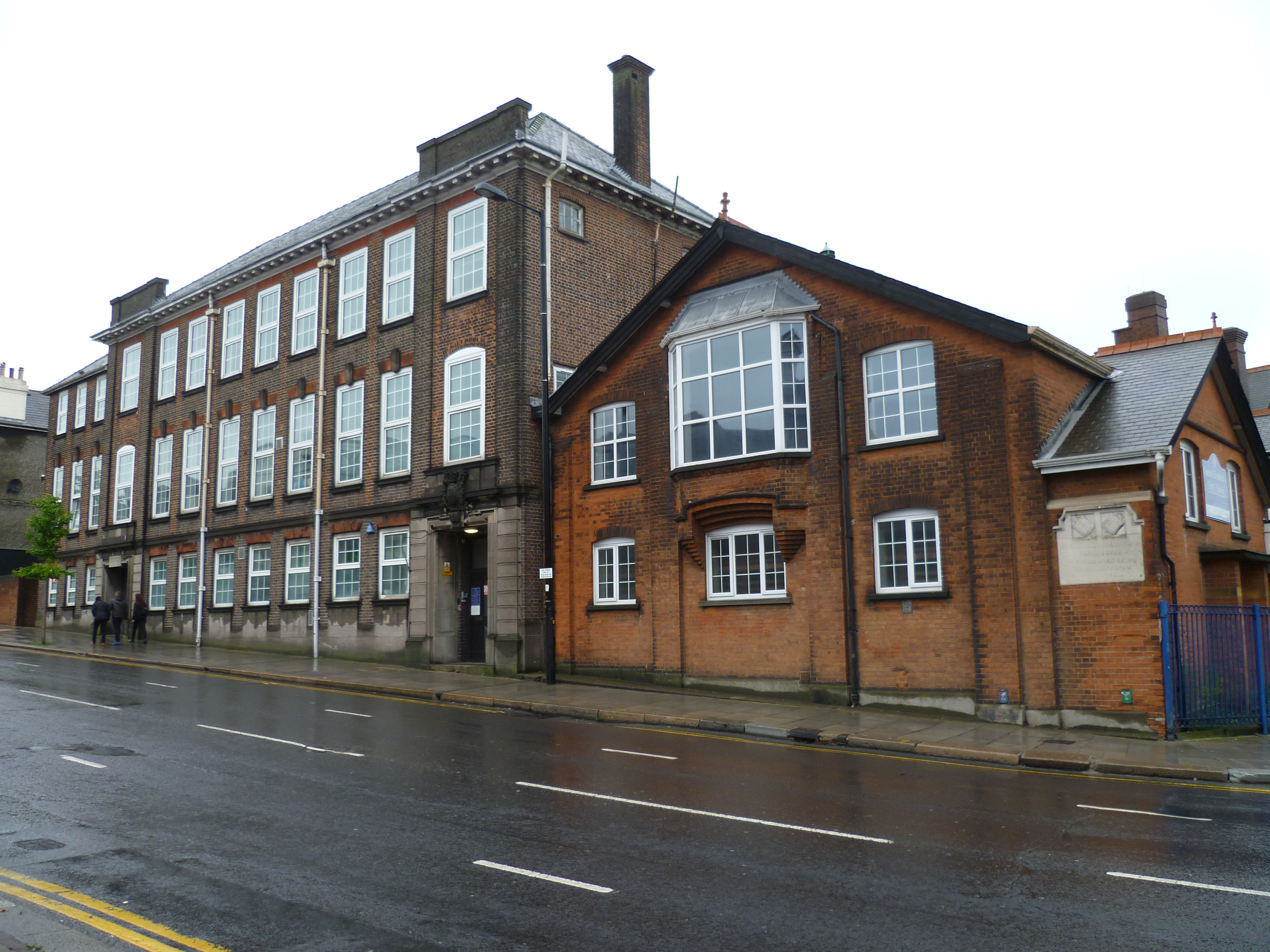

Location
- High Street; Barnet, Greater London, EN5 5RR; England
- 51.6518°N 0.1968°W

Information
- Type: Academy
- Motto: Educating women of the future
- Religious affiliation: non affiliated
- Established: 1888
- Department for Education URN: 137131 Tables
- Ofsted: Reports
- Chair of the Governors: Royden Gothelf
- Headteacher: Violet Walker
- Gender: Girls
- Age: 11 to 18
- Colours: Pale blue and navy blue
- Website: http://www.qegschool.org.uk/

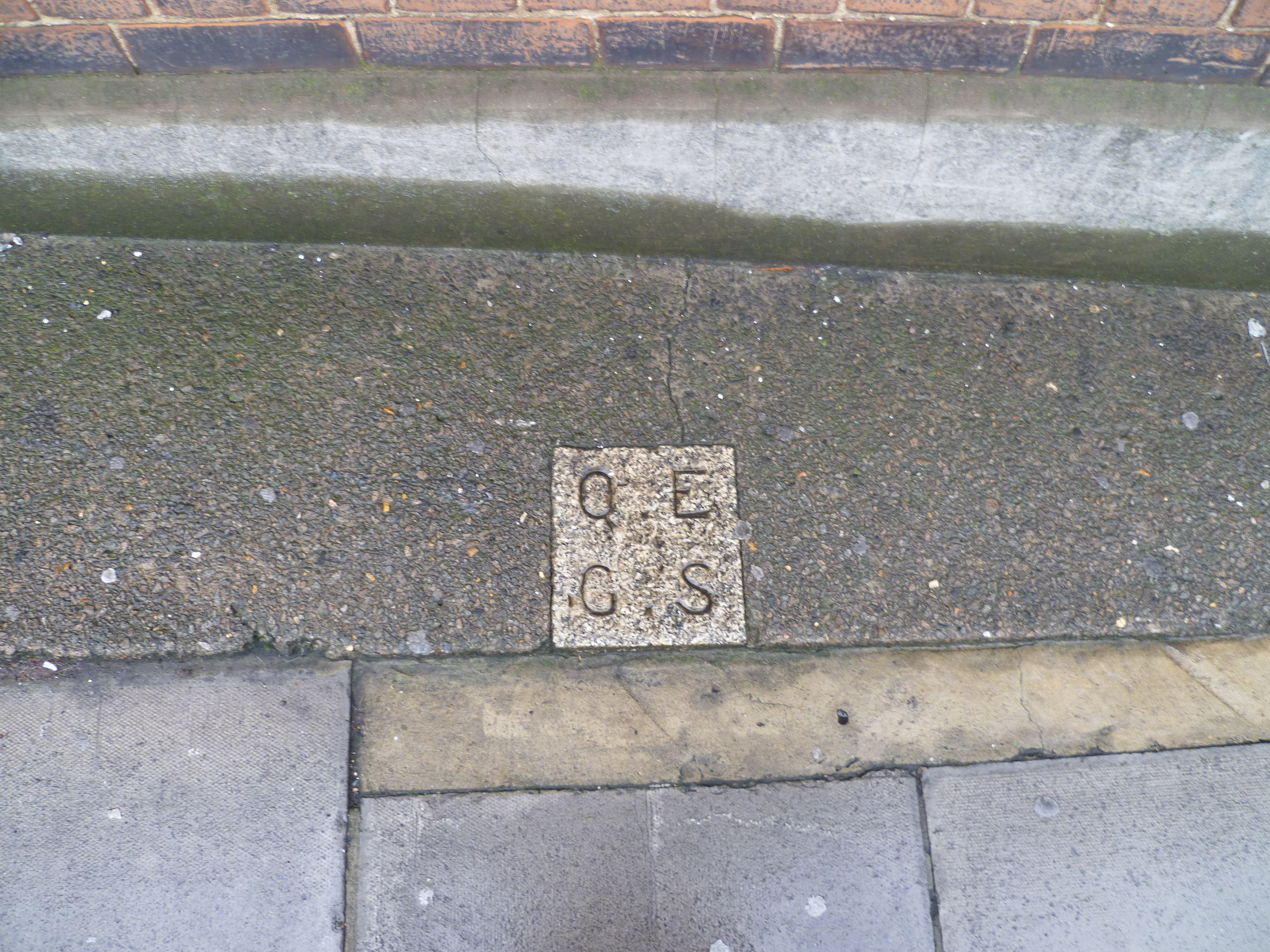
A school boundary marker on Barnet High Street.

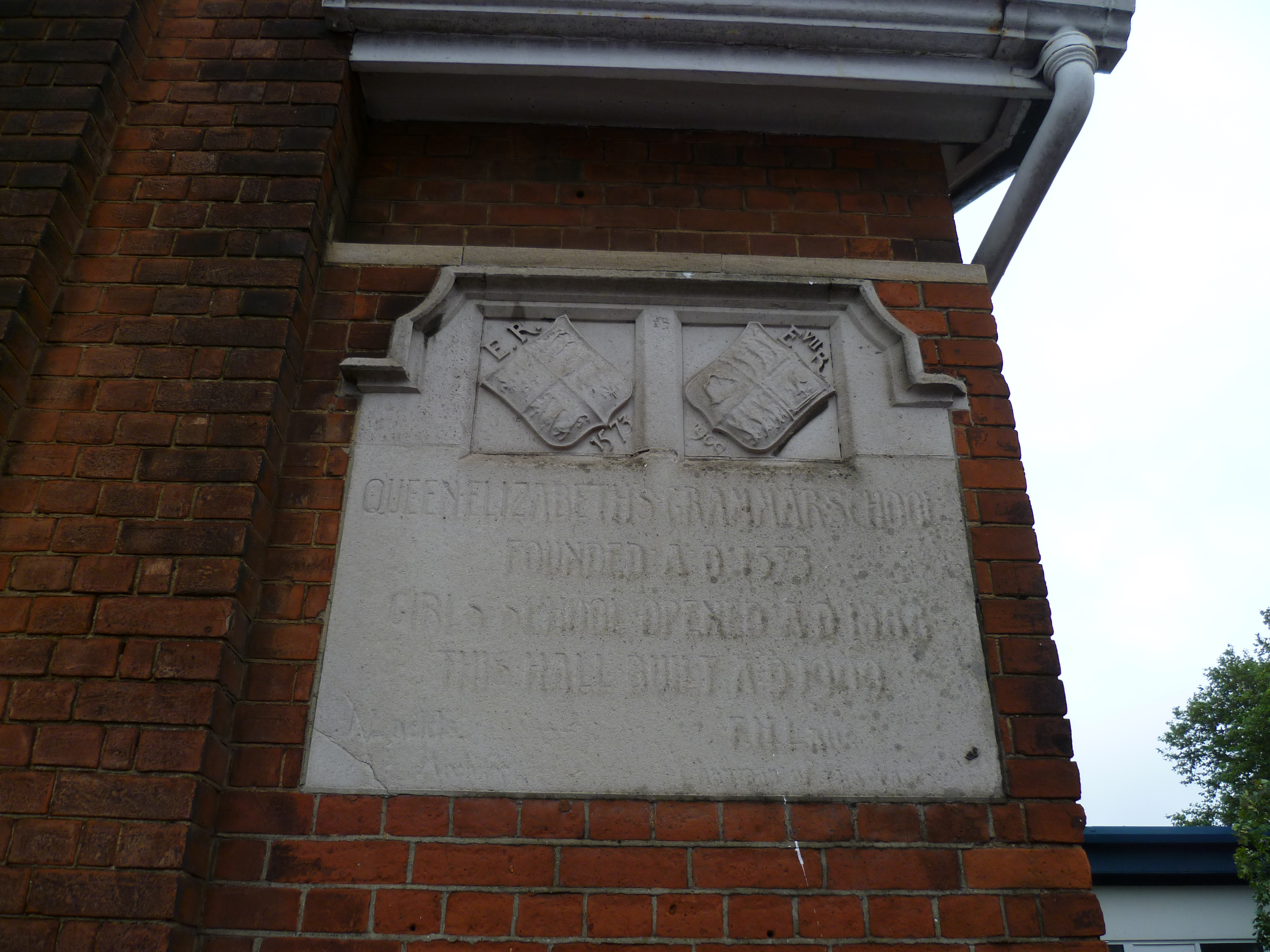
Memorial plaque.

Queen Elizabeth's Girls' School is a high performing non-selective girls' school with academy status for ages 11 to 18, in Barnet, London, England.

In the academic year 2016/17 it was ranked in the top 1.3 per cent of all secondary schools (including selective schools) in England by the Department for Education. It is the top performing non-selective all-girls comprehensive in the country and is placed 47th on the national league table. It is praised by the 2017 Good Schools Guide, as a "relaxed, safe and friendly place, with “a firm hand on the tiller and rocketing results.”

== History ==
Queen Elizabeth's Girls' School was founded in 1888. The school was the first girls' school to open in Hertfordshire, being administered by the South Herts Division of Hertfordshire County Council until 1965. Originally a grammar school for around 700 girls, the school has expanded significantly and there are now over 1100 girls on roll. On 17 May 2013 the school celebrated its 125th anniversary which was marked by a number of events including the painting of a mural in the main courtyard.

== Comprehensive ==
Barnet schools started to become comprehensive in 1971 under a scheme known as Plan C. QEGS became comprehensive year by year from 1977.

== Academy Status ==
On 1 August 2011 QEGS became a converter academy. There was no name change.

== Theatre ==
Students from the school stage theatrical productions several times a year in one of their three acting spaces, which include the hall, a traditional proscenium arch stage, and the "drama studio", a black box acting space.

In November 2022 students from years 7-11 staged the musical 'Matilda Jr' in four sold out performances.

== Sport ==
QE has nine (confirmed by the school literature and google aerial visuals) tennis courts, three fields, a gym (equipped with climbing apparatus), a fitness gym, a swimming pool a sports hall and twenty nine acres of grassland. The annual Sports Day was held at Barnet Copthall, it is now held in the grounds due to high demand for Barnet Copthall from other Barnet schools. Sports day is usually in June/July. There are frequent student v. student, teacher v. teacher and student v. teacher matches; however, student v. teacher football matches are not permitted. Every other year QE holds a sponsored jog in which all girls are encouraged to participate. The school also participates in sports outreach work with local feeder primary schools.

== Notable former pupils ==
- Stephanie Beacham, actress
- Margaret Biggs, children's author
- Isobel Black, actress
- Prof Patricia Broadfoot CBE, Vice-Chancellor, 2006-2010, of the University of Gloucestershire, and Professor of Education from 1991-2006 at the University of Bristol
- The Right Reverend Christine Hardman, The Lord Bishop of Newcastle
- Marguerite Patten CBE, (née Brown) home economist, food writer and broadcaster
- Ann Thwaite, writer
- Phildel, musician

== See also ==
- Queen Elizabeth's School, Barnet
