= Christine Hardman =

British Anglican bishop (born 1951)

The Right Reverend Christine Hardman
- Bishop of Newcastle
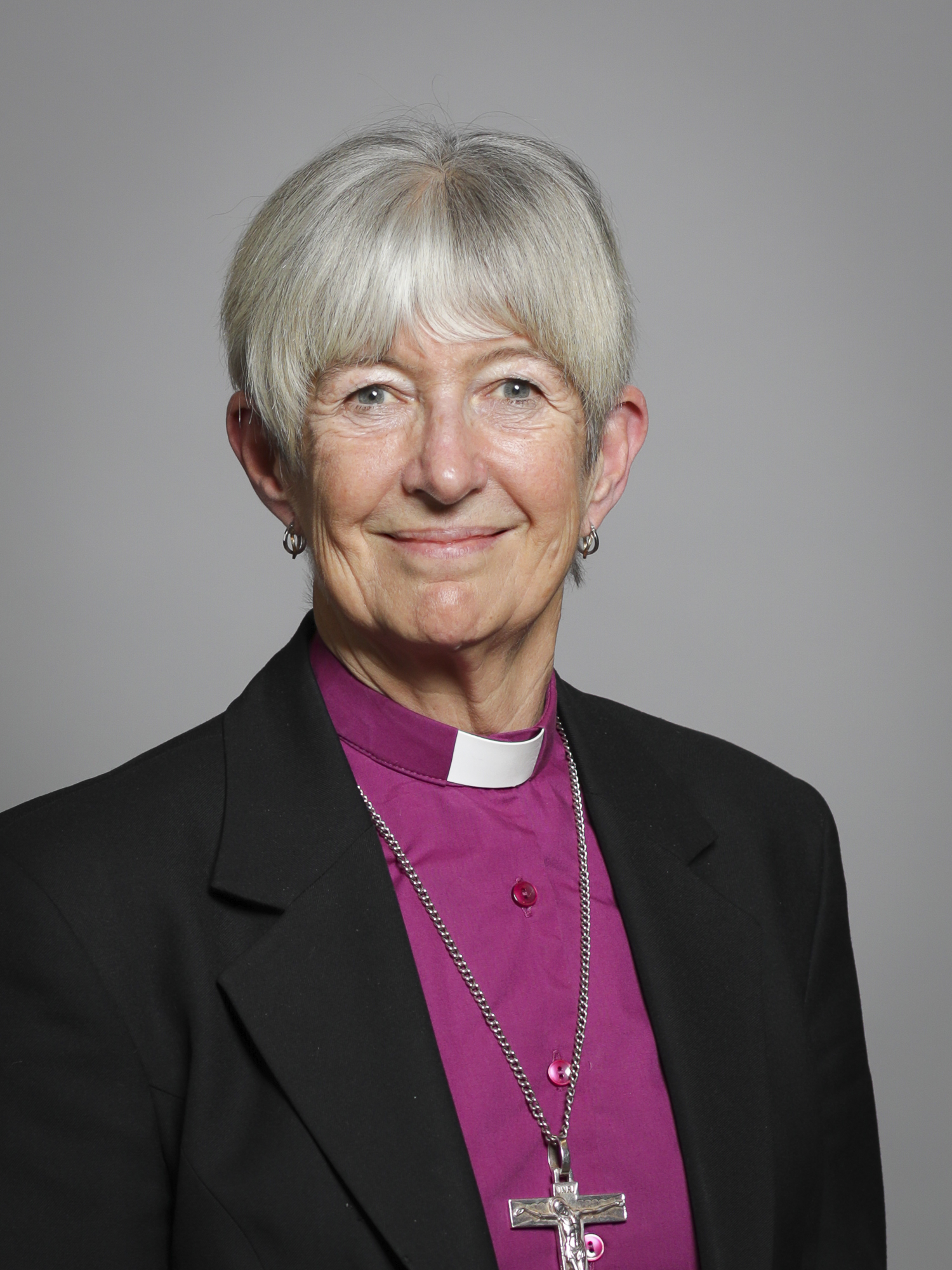
- Official portrait, 2019
- Church: Church of England
- Diocese: Diocese of Newcastle
- In office: 22 September 2015 – 30 November 2021
- Predecessor: Martin Wharton
- Successor: Helen-Ann Hartley
- Other posts: Archdeacon of Lewisham/of Lewisham & Greenwich (2001–2012; title changed 2008); Lord Spiritual (2016–2021)

Orders
- Ordination: 1987 (deacon); 1994 (priest)
- Consecration: 30 November 2015 by John Sentamu

Personal details
- Born: Christine Elizabeth Atkins; 27 August 1951 (age 74)
- Denomination: Anglicanism
- Residence: Bishop's House, Gosforth
- Spouse: Roger (m. 1971)
- Children: 2
- Education: Queen Elizabeth's School for Girls
- Alma mater: University of London; Westminster College, Oxford

Member of the House of Lords
- Lord Spiritual
- Bishop of Newcastle; 26 January 2016 – 30 November 2021

Christine Elizabeth Hardman (née Atkins; born 27 August 1951) is a retired British Anglican bishop and former Lord Spiritual. She served as Archdeacon of Lewisham, 2001–2008; Archdeacon of Lewisham & Greenwich, 2008–2012; and Bishop of Newcastle, 2015–2021.

== Early life and education ==
Hardman was educated at Queen Elizabeth's School for Girls, then an all-girls' grammar school in Barnet, London. She studied economics at Woolwich Polytechnic (now the University of Greenwich), and graduated from the University of London with a Bachelor of Science (BSc) degree in 1973. After this, she worked as an articled clerk and with an estate agency. She later studied Applied Theology at Westminster College, Oxford, and graduated with a Master of Theology (MTh) degree in 1994.

Hardman trained for ordained ministry on a part-time basis with the St Albans Ministry Course (this later merged to become the present day Eastern Region Ministry Course). She is the first Church of England diocesan bishop to have been trained on a part-time course rather than at a residential theological college.

== Ordained ministry ==
Hardman was licensed as a deaconess at Michaelmas 1984 (30 September) by John Taylor, Bishop of St Albans, at St Albans Cathedral, and served at St John the Baptist, Markyate Street in the Diocese of St Albans from 1984 to 1987. She was made a deacon on 9 May 1987, by John Taylor, Bishop of St Albans, at St John's, Chipping Barnet. She then served as Parish Deacon of St John's for a year. From 1988 to 1991, she was a tutor on the St Albans Ministerial Training Scheme. She served as Course Director of the St Albans and Oxford Ministry Course from 1991 to 1996. She was ordained as a priest in 1994; the first year that the Church of England ordained women to the priesthood. She returned to St John the Baptist, Markyate Street to serve her curacy between 1994 and 1996.

Hardman was then Vicar of Holy Trinity and Christ the King, Stevenage from 1996 to 2001, as well as Rural Dean of Stevenage from 1999 to 2001. She was then Archdeacon of Lewisham (the title of the post changed to Archdeacon of Lewisham & Greenwich in 2008) until her retirement from the post on 30 November 2012. She then became an assistant priest at Southwark Cathedral and held the title of archdeacon-emeritus.

She has been a Member of the General Synod of the Church of England since 1998, with a brief break, and was the Prolocutor of the Lower House of the Convocation of Canterbury in the last synod 2010–2015; as a diocesan bishop she automatically became a member of the synod once again in the House of Bishops. On the synod, she has served on the following committees: Eucharistic Prayers Revision Committee, the Dioceses and Pastoral Measures Review Group, and the Ethical Investment Advisory Group. She was involved in the legislation which allowed women to become bishops in the Church of England.

=== Episcopal ministry ===
On 2 September 2015, it was announced that Hardman was to become the twelfth Bishop of Newcastle — the second woman to be a diocesan bishop in the Church of England and the first in the Province of York. She became the Bishop of Newcastle when her canonical election was confirmed on 22 September 2015 at York Minster. On 30 November 2015, she was consecrated a bishop by John Sentamu, Archbishop of York, during a service at York Minster. On 12 December, a service of inauguration was held at Newcastle Cathedral during which she was enthroned as Bishop of Newcastle.

Upon the retirement on 30 September 2015 of Jonathan Gledhill, Bishop of Lichfield, a seat in the House of Lords became vacant. With the passing of the Lords Spiritual (Women) Act 2015, the vacancy had to be filled by a woman if one were eligible. As Hardman's confirmation of election had taken place eight days earlier, she became eligible. On 18 November 2015, she officially joined the House of Lords as a Lord Spiritual but tradition dictates that she would only take her place once she had participated in an introduction ceremony. She was introduced to the House of Lords on 26 January 2016, and made her maiden speech on 25 May 2016.

On 14 August 2021, Hardman announced her retirement, effective 30 November 2021.

== Personal life ==
In 1971, at the age of 19, she married Roger Hardman at St Peter's Church, Arkley, Hertfordshire; they now have two adult daughters and four grandchildren. Her hobbies including running and cycling; she has completed the London Marathon three times and the Great North Run once.

== Styles ==
- The Reverend Christine Hardman (1987–2001)
- The Venerable Christine Hardman (2001 – 22 September 2015)
- The Reverend Christine Hardman (22 September – 30 November 2015)
- The Right Reverend Christine Hardman (30 November 2015 – present)

Church of England titles
Preceded by David Atkinson	Archdeacon of Lewisham; 2001–2012	Succeeded by Alastair Cutting
Preceded by Martin Wharton	Bishop of Newcastle; 2015–2021	Succeeded by Helen-Ann Hartley
