= Bingfield =

Village in Northumberland, England

Coordinates: 55.047°N 2.041°W

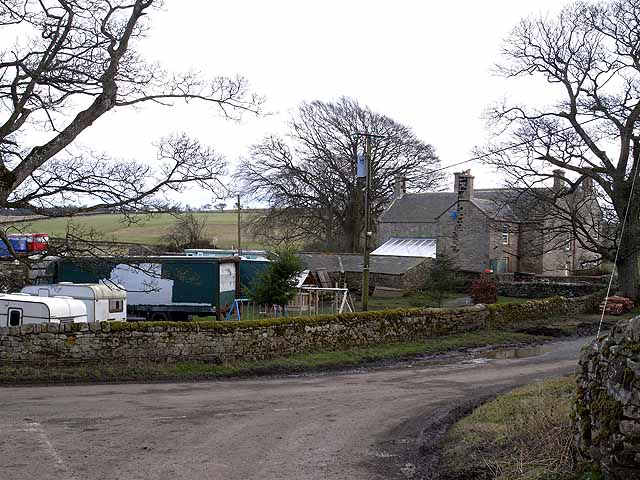
- Bingfield

- Location within Northumberland
- OS grid reference: NY975725
- Civil parish: Whittington
- Unitary authority: Northumberland
- Ceremonial county: Northumberland
- Region: North East
- Country: England
- Sovereign state: United Kingdom
- Post town: NEWCASTLE UPON TYNE (parts) and HEXHAM (parts)
- Postcode district: NE19 and NE46
- Dialling code: 01434
- Police: Northumbria
- Fire: Northumberland
- Ambulance: North East
- UK Parliament: Hexham

Bingfield is a village and former civil parish, now in the parish of Whittington, in Northumberland, in England. It is situated to the north of Corbridge, off the A68 road and includes some properties situated on the A68 (Dere Street). In 1951 the parish had a population of 76.

== Governance ==
Bingfield is in the parliamentary constituency of Hexham. Bingfield was formerly a township in St. John-Lee parish, from 1866 Bingfield was a civil parish in its own right until it was abolished on 1 April 1955 and merged with Whittington.

== History ==
Bingfield was an ancient settlement. There are the remains of an ancient medieval village in the field in front of the church, uncovered during an oil excavation.

Most of the buildings in Bingfield date to the early 19th century. There were probably four farms, a school, and a church which dates to the late 18th/early 19th century. The church and school were also used by residents of neighbouring Hallington, which had neither of its own.

Bingfield remained largely unchanged from the mid 19th century until after the Second World War, when mechanisation brought significant change to the farming industry. Since the 1970s there was a period of farmers selling off redundant farm buildings to be converted into houses.

== Bingfield Hall ==
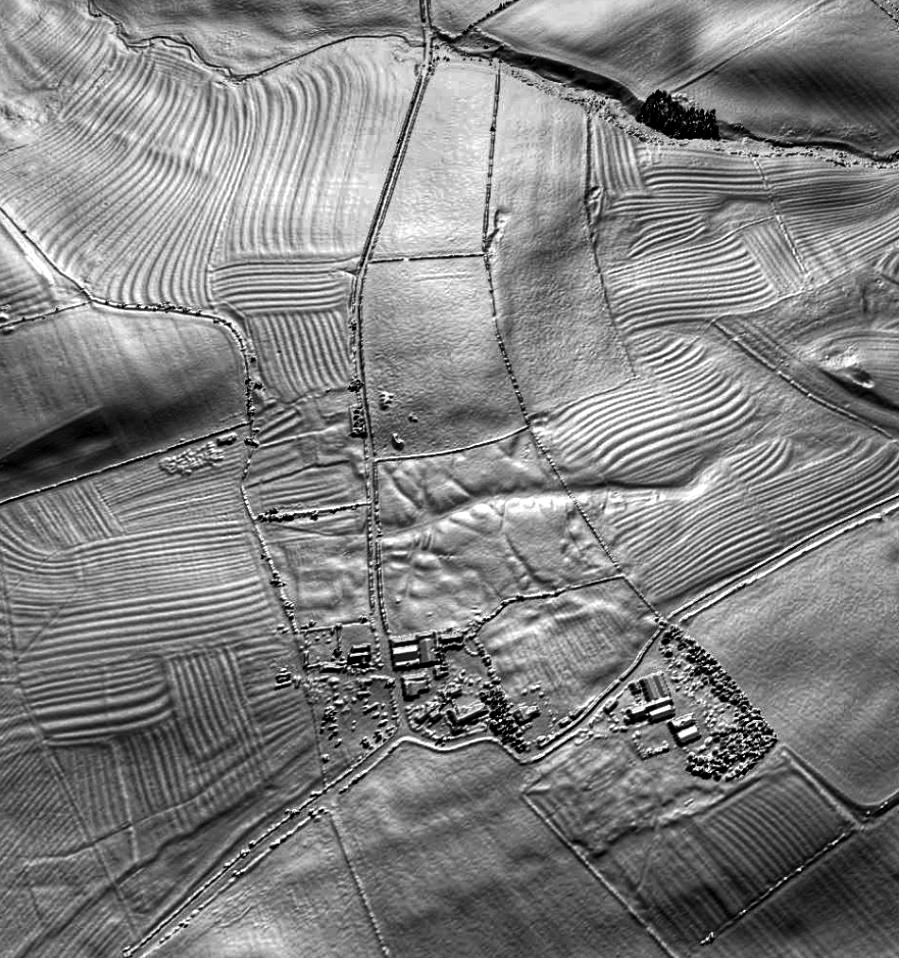
A lidar view of the site of Bingfield shrunken Medieval village

Bingfield Hall was in the hands of the Story family for many years. John Story of Bingfield Hall (1648-1725) emigrated to Ireland and settled as a major landowner at Corick House, near Clogher, County Tyrone. In 1745, his descendant Joseph Story, Archdeacon of Kilmore Cathedral, built a house there called Bingfield.

Genealogical records of the Northumberland Storys survive from the 17th and 18th centuries, but Bingfield Hall is long demolished and replaced by a farmhouse, now also in ruins. No trace of the Hall or memory of the family remained by 1895.

== Bingfield Combe Cottage ==
Bingfield Combe Cottage was built in around 1830 to store carts and farm machinery such as ploughs for Bingfield farm, about one mile away at the bottom of the hill, which is now two separately-owned farms. The stone was probably sourced from the quarry along the ridge, although some have claimed that actual stones were removed from Hadrian's Wall, less than three miles (5 km) to the south from Bingfield. As well as the cottage, there were two other buildings used to support the farm. The next-door house, then a barn, was for stabling horses and cattle, and the house behind the cottage was the gin gang, a large room for grinding corn. A horse was hooked up to a gear system which operated grinding stones powered by a horse walking round the room. It is supposed that these buildings were built uphill away from the farm to save the farmer transporting equipment up and down the hill in the days before mechanization (tractors).

== See also ==
- Chollerton
- Matfen
