= Diocese of Newcastle =

Diocese of the Church of England

Coordinates: 54°58′12″N 1°36′40″W

Diocese of Newcastle Dioecesis Novicastrensis
- Coat of arms

- Flag

Location
- Ecclesiastical province: York
- Archdeaconries: Lindisfarne, Northumberland

Statistics
- Parishes: 177
- Churches: 242

Information
- Cathedral: Newcastle Cathedral
- Language: English

Current leadership
- Bishop: Helen-Ann Hartley, Bishop of Newcastle
- Suffragan: Mark Wroe, Bishop of Berwick
- Archdeacons: Catherine Sourbut Groves, Archdeacon of Lindisfarne; Rachel Wood, Archdeacon of Northumberland

Website
- www.newcastle.anglican.org

The Diocese of Newcastle is a Church of England diocese based in Newcastle upon Tyne, covering the historic county of Northumberland (and therefore including the part of Tyne and Wear north of the River Tyne), as well as the area of Alston Moor in Cumbria (historic Cumberland).

The diocese came into being on 23 May 1882, and was one of four created by the Bishoprics Act 1878 (41 & 42 Vict. c. 68) for industrial areas with rapidly expanding populations. The area of the diocese was taken from the part of the Diocese of Durham which was north of the River Tyne, and was defined in the legislation as comprising:

"....the county of Northumberland, and the counties of the towns of Newcastle-upon-Tyne and Berwick-upon-Tweed, and to include such detached parts of any other county as are under any Act of Parliament deemed to form part of the county of Northumberland, or have been or can be transferred to the county of Northumberland by the justices in general or quarter sessions assembled, and to include also the ancient common law parish of Alston with its chapelries in the county of Cumberland...."

The cathedral is Newcastle Cathedral (until 1882 the Parish Church of St Nicholas) and the diocesan bishop is Helen-Ann Hartley, Bishop of Newcastle.

In 1966 the diocese appointed Northumberland Archives as its diocesan record office. The Woodhorn office of Northumberland Archives preserves and makes accessible the archival records of the diocese and its parishes.

== Bishops ==
The diocesan Bishop of Newcastle is the ordinary of the diocese and is assisted by the Bishop of Berwick. Alternative episcopal oversight (for parishes in the diocese who reject the ministry of priests who are women) is provided by the provincial episcopal visitor (PEV) the Bishop suffragan of Beverley, Stephen Race. He is licensed as an honorary assistant bishop of the diocese in order to facilitate his work there.

On 28 November 2015, Frank White, then the full-time assistant bishop, presented a proposal to the Diocesan Synod (within which diocese Berwick now lies) to revive the abeyant Suffragan See of Berwick. The Dioceses Commission approved the petition to revive the See and Mark Tanner was consecrated Bishop of Berwick on 18 October 2016; he later vacated the post upon his translation to Chester. Mark Wroe, formerly Archdeacon of Northumberland, was consecrated as Bishop of Berwick on 5 January 2021.

Besides Race, there are four retired honorary assistant bishops licensed in the diocese:

- 2003–present: A retired Bishop suffragan of Bedford, John Richardson, lives in Bewcastle, Cumbria and is also licensed in Carlisle diocese.
- 2014–present: Stephen Platten, Rector of St Michael Cornhill (Diocese of London) and retired Bishop of Wakefield (also in London and Southwark dioceses.)
- 2014–present: John Packer, Bishop of Ripon and Leeds and former Bishop suffragan of Warrington, retired in 2014 to Cullercoats.
- 2021–present: John Sentamu, former Archbishop of York

== Archdeaconries and deaneries ==
=== Archdeacons ===
On 8 November 2020, it was announced that the Archdeacon of Northumberland, Mark Wroe, was to become the Bishop of Berwick. Following his consecration 5 January 2021, Rachel Wood, vicar of St Mary's, Monkseaton, will also be the acting Archdeacon of Northumberland.

Catherine Sourbut Groves was collated as Archdeacon of Lindisfarne on 14 November 2020. Due to restrictions as a result of the COVID-19 pandemic, the service was conducted online.

Archdeaconries	Rural Deaneries	Paid clergy	Churches	Population	People/clergy	People/church	Churches/clergy
Archdeaconry of Northumberland	Deanery of Bedlington	12	21	134,406	11,201	6,400	1.75
Archdeaconry of Northumberland	Deanery of Newcastle Central*	21	22	104,897	4,995	4,768	1.05
Archdeaconry of Northumberland	Deanery of Newcastle East	10	10	85,485	8,549	8,549	1
Archdeaconry of Northumberland	Deanery of Newcastle West	12	19	126,835	10,570	6,676	1.58
Archdeaconry of Northumberland	Deanery of Tynemouth	12	20	150,722	12,560	7,536	1.67
Archdeaconry of Lindisfarne	Deanery of Alnwick	8	28	36,474	4,559	1,303	3.5
Archdeaconry of Lindisfarne	Deanery of Bamburgh and Glendale	3	16	9,386	3,129	587	5.33
Archdeaconry of Lindisfarne	Deanery of Bellingham	2	19	7,108	3,554	374	9.5
Archdeaconry of Lindisfarne	Deanery of Corbridge	7	22	29,762	4,252	1,353	3.14
Archdeaconry of Lindisfarne	Deanery of Hexham	5	22	28,816	5,763	1,310	4.4
Archdeaconry of Lindisfarne	Deanery of Morpeth	11	27	67,085	6,099	2,485	2.45
Archdeaconry of Lindisfarne	Deanery of Norham	4	13	18,155	4,539	1,397	3.25
Total/average		107	239	799,131	7,469	3,344	2.23

*includes Cathedral

== List of churches ==
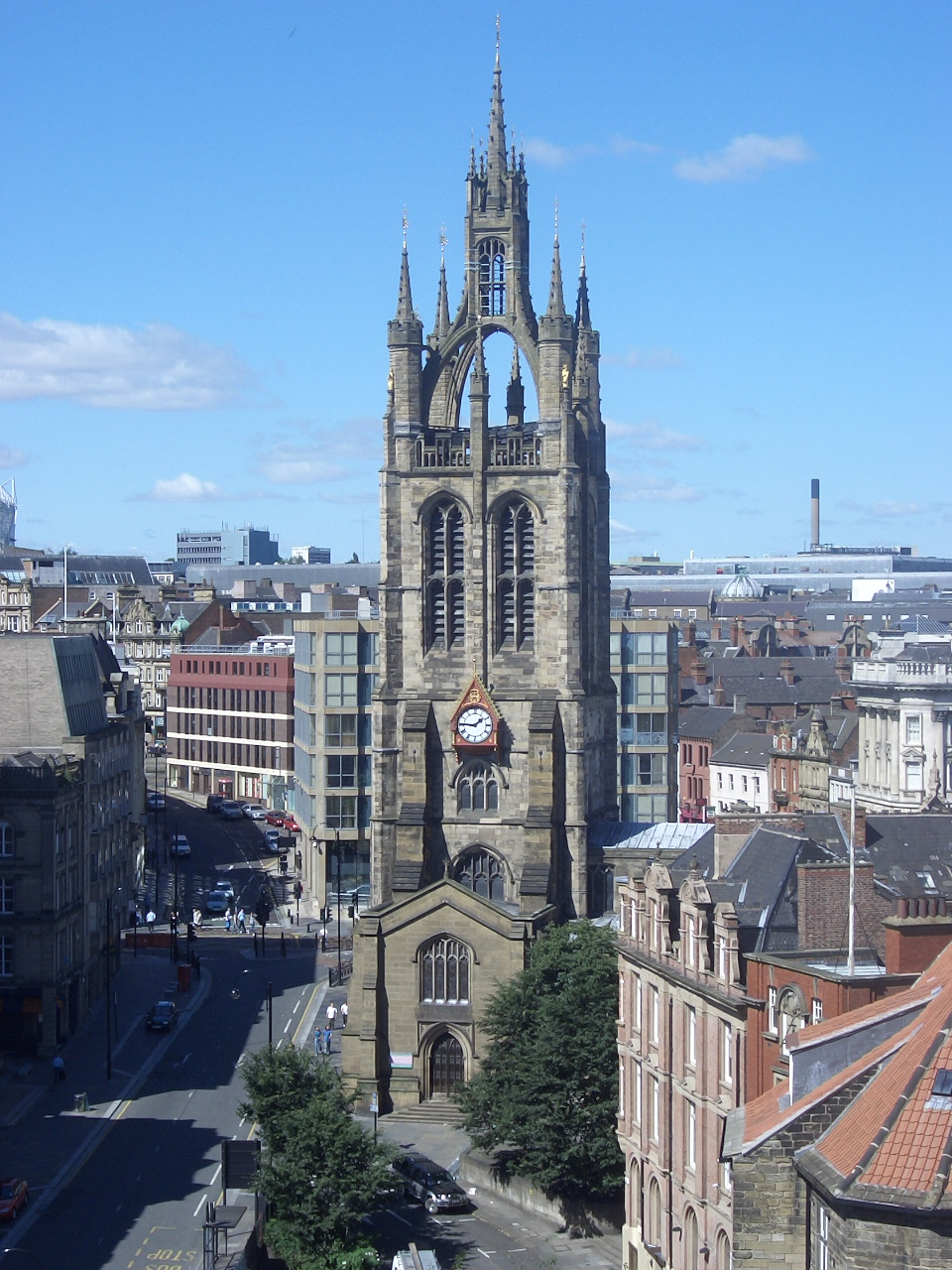
Cathedral of St Nicholas, Newcastle

=== Outside a deanery ===
Benefice	Church	Link	Founded (building)	Stip. clergy	Population served
Cathedra	Cathedral of St Nicholas, Newcastle		Medieval	G. Miller; C. MacLaren; P. Dobson; R. Saner-Haigh	540

=== Deanery of Bedlington ===
Benefice	Church	Link	Founded (building)	Stip. clergy	Population served
Bedlington, Cambois and Sleekburn	St Cuthbert, Bedlington			I. Hennebry	18,650
Bedlington, Cambois and Sleekburn	St Andrew, Cambois		1898	I. Hennebry	18,650
Bedlington, Cambois and Sleekburn	St John the Evangelist, Sleekburn			I. Hennebry	18,650
Blyth (St Cuthbert)	St Cuthbert, Blyth		1751 (1892)	A. Tooby	12,029
Blyth (St Mary)	St Mary, Blyth		1864	-	15,063
Cowpen	St Benedict, Cowpen		early C20th (1961)	-	15,063
Choppington	St Paul the Apostle, Choppington			T. Moat	9,583
Choppington	Holy Family, Stakeford			T. Moat	9,583
Cramlington	St Nicholas, Cramlington			W. Docherty; D. Gray; E. Hudson	28,779
Cramlington	St Andrew, Cramlington			W. Docherty; D. Gray; E. Hudson	28,779
Cramlington	St Peter, Cramlington			W. Docherty; D. Gray; E. Hudson	28,779
Delaval	Our Lady, Delaval		Medieval	D. Bowler	5,003
Delaval	St Michael & All Angels, New Hartley		1900	D. Bowler	5,003
Delaval	St Paul, Seaton Sluice		1886 (1961)	D. Bowler	5,003
Killingworth	St John the Evangelist, Killingworth		1869	S. Moon	15,323
Newsham and Horton	St Mary the Virgin, Horton		Medieval (1827)	I. Flintoft	10,845
Newsham and Horton	St Bede, Newsham		1892 (1957)	I. Flintoft	10,845
Seghill	Holy Trinity, Seghill		1849	P. Hughes; D. Bell	10,438
Seghill	St Mary, Holywell		1885	P. Hughes; D. Bell	10,438
Weetslade	St Paul, Dudley		1886	A. Maughan	8,693
Weetslade	Good Shepherd, Burradon		1979	A. Maughan	8,693

=== Deanery of Newcastle Central ===
Benefice	Church	Link	Founded (building)	Stip. clergy	Population served
Christ the King in the Diocese of Newcastle	St Cuthbert, Brunswick		1905	3	17,272
Christ the King in the Diocese of Newcastle	St Aidan, Brunton Park		1944 (1956)	3	17,272
Christ the King in the Diocese of Newcastle	St Matthew, Dinnington		1835 (1886)	3	17,272
Christ the King in the Diocese of Newcastle	St Columba, North Gosforth		??? (1983)	3	17,272
Christ the King in the Diocese of Newcastle	Church in the Park		2014	3	17,272
Fawdon	St Mary the Virgin, Fawdon		1959	1	4,850
Gosforth (All Saints)	All Saints, Gosforth		1887	1	14,733
Gosforth (St Hugh)	St Hugh, Gosforth			1	14,733
Gosforth (St Nicholas)	St Nicholas, Gosforth		Ancient (Medieval)	1	9,355
Jesmond (Clayton Memorial Church)	Jesmond Parish Church		1861	2	4,749
Jesmond (Holy Trinity)	Holy Trinity, Jesmond		1905 (1922)	1	5,857
Kenton	Ascension, Kenton			1	12,490
Kingston Park	St John, Kingston Park^{1}		1975 (1991)	1	6,959
Newcastle Upon Tyne (Christ Church) (St Ann)	Christ Church, Shieldfield		1861	1	6,757
Newcastle Upon Tyne (Christ Church) (St Ann)	St Ann, Battlefield		1768	1	6,757
Newcastle Upon Tyne (St Andrew)	St Andrew, Newcastle		Medieval	1	3,657
Newcastle Upon Tyne (St Thomas) Proprietary Chapel	Church of St Thomas the Martyr, Newcastle		Medieval	1	N/A
Newcastle Upon Tyne (St George) (St Hilda)	St George, Jesmond		1888	2	13,818
Newcastle Upon Tyne (St George) (St Hilda)	St Hilda, Jesmond		1905	2	13,818
Newcastle Upon Tyne (St John the Baptist)	St John the Baptist, Newcastle		Medieval	0	1,952
Newcastle Upon Tyne (St Luke)	St Luke, Newcastle		1886	1	1,908

^{1}Local ecumenical partnership (CoE/Baptist/Methodist/URC)

=== Deanery of Newcastle East ===
Benefice	Church	Link	Founded (building)	Stip. clergy	Population served
Byker (St Anthony)	St Anthony of Egypt, Byker			2	10,484
Byker (St Martin) Newcastle Upon Tyne	St Martin, Byker		1933	2	10,484
Byker (St Michael with St Lawrence)	St Michael, Byker		1862	1	14,699
Walker	Christ Church, Walker		1848	1	14,699
Byker (St Silas)	St Silas, Byker		1886	1	6,263
Byker St Mark and Walkergate (St Oswald)	St Oswald, Walkergate			1	7,219
Long Benton (St Bartholomew)	St Bartholomew, Long Benton		Medieval	1	14,106
Long Benton (St Mary Magdalene)	St Mary Magdalene, Long Benton			1	7,095
Newcastle Upon Tyne (St Francis) High Heaton	St Francis, High Heaton			2	9,384
Newcastle Upon Tyne (St Gabriel) Heaton	St Gabriel, Heaton		1899	1	16,235

=== Deanery of Newcastle West ===
Benefice	Church	Link	Founded (building)	Stip. clergy	Population served
Benwell and The Scotswood Team	St James, Benwell		1833	3	20,088
Benwell and The Scotswood Team	Venerable Bede, Benwell		1937	3	20,088
Benwell and The Scotswood Team	St John the Baptist, Benwell Village		1820s (1950s)	3	20,088
Benwell and The Scotswood Team	St Margaret, Scotswood		1915	3	20,088
Chapel House	Holy Nativity, Chapel House			0	5,018
Cowgate	St Peter, Cowgate			2	17,507
Newbiggin Hall	St Wilfrid, Newbiggin Hall		1967	2	17,507
Denton	Holy Spirit, Denton			0	11,716
Elswick	Elswick Parish Church		1840s	1	5,372
Fenham	SS James & Basil, Fenham		1931	1	9,584
Newburn	St Michael & All Angels, Newburn		Ancient (Medieval)	1	9,743
Newburn	St Mary the Virgin, Throckley		1887	1	9,743
Newcastle Upon Tyne (Holy Cross)	Holy Cross, Fenham		1936	0	7,650
Newcastle Upon Tyne (St Philip) and St Augustine and (St Matthew with St Mary)	SS Philip & Augustine, Newcastle			1	9,954
Newcastle Upon Tyne (St Philip) and St Augustine and (St Matthew with St Mary)	St Matthew, Newcastle		1877	1	9,954
Ponteland	St Mary the Virgin, Ponteland		Ancient (Medieval)	1	11,077
Ponteland	Holy Saviour, Milbourne		1871	1	11,077
Sugley	Holy Saviour, Sugley		1837	1	7,612
Whorlton	St John the Evangelist, Whorlton		1866	1	11,514

=== Deanery of Tynemouth ===
Benefice	Church	Link	Founded (building)	Stip. clergy	Population served
Balkwell	St Peter, Balkwell			L. Cleminson	17,210
Tynemouth (St John Percy)	St John Percy, Tynemouth		1862	L. Cleminson	17,210
Billy Mill	St Aidan, Billy Mill			-	14,241
Marden with Preston Grange	St Hilda, Marden with Preston Grange		1966	-	14,241
Cullercoats	St George, Cullercoats		1884	A. Hughes	6,528
Earsdon and Backworth	St Alban, Earsdon		Medieval (1837)	T. Mayfield	5,630
Earsdon and Backworth	St John the Baptist, Backworth		1886	T. Mayfield	5,630
Monkseaton (St Mary)	St Mary, Monkseaton			R. Wood; B. Jarvis	8,467
Monkseaton (St Peter)	St Peter, Monkseaton		1886 (1938)	-	14,811
North Shields	St Augustin, North Shields		1884	G. Evans	14,781
North Shields	Christ Church, North Shields		C16th (1793)	G. Evans	14,781
Shiremoor	St Mark, Shiremoor			-	9,618
Tynemouth Cullercoats (St Paul)	St Paul, Whitley Bay		1864	J. Vilaseca-Bruch	9,407
Tynemouth Priory (Holy Saviour)	Holy Saviour, Tynemouth Priory		1841	S. Dixon	5,914
Wallsend (St John the Evangelist)	St John the Evangelist, Wallsend			E. Duff	11,159
Wallsend (St Peter) (St Luke)	St Peter, Wallsend		1809	E. Kormos	9,256
Wallsend (St Peter) (St Luke)	St Luke, Wallsend		1887	E. Kormos	9,256
The Willington Team	St Mary the Virgin, Willington			S. McCormack; J. Mooney	23,700
The Willington Team	Good Shepherd, Battle Hill (LEP)			S. McCormack; J. Mooney	23,700
The Willington Team	St Paul, Willington Quay		1859 (1876)	S. McCormack; J. Mooney	23,700

=== Deanery of Alnwick ===
Benefice	Church	Link	Founded (building)	Stip. clergy	Population served
Alnwick	SS Michael & Paul, Alnwick		Medieval	P. Scott; G. Rundell	8,349
Alnwick	Denwick Chapel		1876	P. Scott; G. Rundell	8,349
Amble	St Cuthbert, Amble		1870	J. McDermott	6,321
Chevington	St John the Divine, Chevington			-	4,200
Upper Coquetdale	St Michael & All Angels, Alnham		Medieval	J. Sinclair	3,961
Upper Coquetdale	St Michael & All Angels, Alwinton		Medieval	J. Sinclair	3,961
Upper Coquetdale	Christ Church, Hepple		1897	J. Sinclair	3,961
Upper Coquetdale	St Mary the Virgin, Holystone		Medieval (1848)	J. Sinclair	3,961
Upper Coquetdale	All Saints, Rothbury		Medieval	J. Sinclair	3,961
Upper Coquetdale	St Andrew, Thropton		1902	J. Sinclair	3,961
Embleton with Rennington and Rock	Holy Trinity, Embleton		Medieval	A. Hardy	1,487
Embleton with Rennington and Rock	Craster Mission Church			A. Hardy	1,487
Embleton with Rennington and Rock	Newton Mission Church			A. Hardy	1,487
Embleton with Rennington and Rock	All Saints, Rennington			A. Hardy	1,487
Embleton with Rennington and Rock	SS Philip & James, Rock			A. Hardy	1,487
Felton	St Michael & All Angels, Felton		Medieval	T. Harvey	3,298
Longframlington with Brinkburn	St Mary the Virgin, Longframlington		Medieval	T. Harvey	3,298
Longframlington with Brinkburn	SS Peter & Paul, Brinkburn			T. Harvey	3,298
Lesbury with Alnmouth	St Mary, Lesbury		Medieval	I. Mackarill	3,378
Lesbury with Alnmouth	St John the Baptist, Alnmouth		Medieval (1876)	I. Mackarill	3,378
Longhoughton (Including Boulmer) with Howick	SS Peter & Paul, Longhoughton		Medieval	I. Mackarill	3,378
Longhoughton (Including Boulmer) with Howick	St Michael & All Angels, Howick		Medieval (1764)	I. Mackarill	3,378
Warkworth, Acklington and Shilbottle	St Lawrence, Warkworth		Ancient (Medieval)	H. O'Sullivan	4,245
Warkworth, Acklington and Shilbottle	St John the Divine, Acklington			H. O'Sullivan	4,245
Warkworth, Acklington and Shilbottle	St James, Shilbottle		Medieval (1885)	H. O'Sullivan	4,245
Whittingham and Edlingham with Bolton Chapel	St Bartholomew, Whittingham		Medieval	-	1,235
Whittingham and Edlingham with Bolton Chapel	St John the Baptist, Edlingham		Medieval	-	1,235
Whittingham and Edlingham with Bolton Chapel	Bolton Chapel, Edlingham		Medieval	-	1,235

=== Deanery of Bamburgh and Glendale ===
Benefice	Church	Link	Founded (building)	Stip. clergy	Population served
Bamburgh, Belford and Lucker	St Aidan, Bamburgh		Ancient (Medieval)	L. Taylor-Kenyon	2,251
Bamburgh, Belford and Lucker	St Mary, Belford		Medieval (1615)	L. Taylor-Kenyon	2,251
Bamburgh, Belford and Lucker	St Hilda, Lucker		late C18th (1874)	L. Taylor-Kenyon	2,251
Beadnell, Ellingham and North Sunderland	St Ebba, Beadnell		C18th (1860)	A. Macpherson	2,808
Beadnell, Ellingham and North Sunderland	St Maurice, Ellingham		pre-C17th (1862)	A. Macpherson	2,808
Beadnell, Ellingham and North Sunderland	St Paul, North Sunderland		1834	A. Macpherson	2,808
Chatton with Chillingham, Eglingham and South Charlton and Ingram	Holy Cross, Chatton		Medieval (1770)	-	1,264
Chatton with Chillingham, Eglingham and South Charlton and Ingram	St Peter, Chillingham		Medieval	-	1,264
Chatton with Chillingham, Eglingham and South Charlton and Ingram	Holy Trinity, Old Bewick		Medieval	-	1,264
Chatton with Chillingham, Eglingham and South Charlton and Ingram	St Maurice, Eglingham		Medieval	-	1,264
Chatton with Chillingham, Eglingham and South Charlton and Ingram	St Michael, Ingram		Medieval	-	1,264
Chatton with Chillingham, Eglingham and South Charlton and Ingram	St James, South Charlton		1862	-	1,264
Doddington, Ilderton, Kirknewton and Wooler	SS Mary & Michael, Doddington		Medieval	S. Cooke	3,063
Doddington, Ilderton, Kirknewton and Wooler	St Michael & All Angels, Ilderton		Medieval	S. Cooke	3,063
Doddington, Ilderton, Kirknewton and Wooler	St Gregory the Great, Kirknewton		Medieval	S. Cooke	3,063
Doddington, Ilderton, Kirknewton and Wooler	St Mary, Wooler		Medieval (1764)	S. Cooke	3,063

=== Deanery of Bellingham ===
Benefice	Church	Link	Founded (building)	Stip. clergy	Population served
Chollerton with Birtley and Thockrington	St Giles, Birtley		Medieval	S. Lunn	1,723
Chollerton with Birtley and Thockrington	St Giles, Chollerton		Medieval	S. Lunn	1,723
Chollerton with Birtley and Thockrington	St Christopher, Gunnerton		1901	S. Lunn	1,723
Chollerton with Birtley and Thockrington	St Aidan, Thockrington		Medieval	S. Lunn	1,723
St Oswald in Lee with Bingfield	St Oswald, Lee		pre-C19th (1817)	S. Lunn	1,723
St Oswald in Lee with Bingfield	St Mary, Bingfield		Medieval	S. Lunn	1,723
St Oswald in Lee with Bingfield	St George, Wall		1896	S. Lunn	1,723
Humshaugh with Simonburn and Wark	St Peter, Humshaugh		1818	-	1,528
Humshaugh with Simonburn and Wark	St Mungo, Simonburn		Medieval	-	1,528
Humshaugh with Simonburn and Wark	St Michael, Wark		1818	-	1,528
North Tyne and Redesdale Team	St Cuthbert, Bellingham		Medieval (1609)	S. Ramsaran	3,857
North Tyne and Redesdale Team	All Saints, West Woodburn		1907	S. Ramsaran	3,857
North Tyne and Redesdale Team	St Cuthbert, Corsenside		Medieval	S. Ramsaran	3,857
North Tyne and Redesdale Team	St Cuthbert, Elsdon		Medieval	S. Ramsaran	3,857
North Tyne and Redesdale Team	St Peter, Falstone		Medieval (1824)	S. Ramsaran	3,857
North Tyne and Redesdale Team	St Aidan, Thorneyburn		1818	S. Ramsaran	3,857
North Tyne and Redesdale Team	St Francis, Byrness		1793	S. Ramsaran	3,857
North Tyne and Redesdale Team	Holy Trinity, Horsley		1844	S. Ramsaran	3,857
North Tyne and Redesdale Team	St John the Evangelist, Otterburn		1858	S. Ramsaran	3,857

=== Deanery of Corbridge ===
Benefice	Church	Link	Founded (building)	Stip. clergy	Population served
Blanchland with Hunstanworth and Edmundbyers and Muggleswick	St Mary the Virgin, Blanchland		Medieval	H. Savage	1,697
Blanchland with Hunstanworth and Edmundbyers and Muggleswick	St James, Hunstanworth		Medieval (1863)	H. Savage	1,697
Blanchland with Hunstanworth and Edmundbyers and Muggleswick	St Edmund, Edmundbyers		Medieval	H. Savage	1,697
Blanchland with Hunstanworth and Edmundbyers and Muggleswick	All Saints, Muggleswick		Medieval (1728)	H. Savage	1,697
Blanchland with Hunstanworth and Edmundbyers and Muggleswick	St Matthew, Waskerley		1896	H. Savage	1,697
Slaley, Healey and Whittonstall	St Mary the Virgin, Slaley		Medieval (1832)	H. Savage	1,697
Slaley, Healey and Whittonstall	St John, Healey		1860	H. Savage	1,697
Slaley, Healey and Whittonstall	SS Philip & James, Whittonstall			H. Savage	1,697
Bywell and Mickley	St Peter, Bywell		Ancient (Medieval)	P. Moran	4,126
Bywell and Mickley	St John, Stocksfield		1927	P. Moran	4,126
Bywell and Mickley	St George, Mickley		1823	P. Moran	4,126
Corbridge with Halton and Newton Hall	St Andrew, Corbridge		Ancient (Medieval)	D. Kennedy; L. Caudwell	4,041
Corbridge with Halton and Newton Hall	SS Oswald, Cuthbert & Alfwald, Halton			D. Kennedy; L. Caudwell	4,041
Heddon-On-The-Wall	St Andrew, Heddon-on-the-Wall		Ancient (Medieval)	-	1,708
Ovingham and Wylam	St Mary the Virgin, Ovingham		Ancient (Medieval)	T. Birch	4,256
Ovingham and Wylam	St Oswin, Wylam		1886	T. Birch	4,256
Prudhoe	St Mary Magdalene, Prudhoe			D. Freyhan	10,845
Riding Mill	St James, Riding Mill		1858	-	975
Shotley	St John, Shotley		1837	-	373
Stamfordham with Matfen	Holy Trinity, Matfen		1842	R. Squires	1,741
Stamfordham with Matfen	All Saints, Ryal		Medieval	R. Squires	1,741
Stamfordham with Matfen	St Mary the Virgin, Stamfordham		Medieval	R. Squires	1,741

=== Deanery of Hexham ===
Benefice	Church	Link	Founded (building)	Stip. clergy	Population served
Allendale with Whitfield	St Cuthbert, Allendale		Medieval (1874)	-	2,473
Allendale with Whitfield	St Mark, Ninebanks		1871	-	2,473
Allendale with Whitfield	Holy Trinity, Whitfield		1860	-	2,473
Allendale with Whitfield	St John, Whitfield		Medieval (1785)	-	2,473
Alston Moor	St Augustine of Canterbury, Alston		Medieval (1870)	M. Nash-Williams	2,714
Alston Moor	St John the Evangelist, Garrigill		Medieval (1790)	M. Nash-Williams	2,714
Alston Moor	Holy Paraclete, Kirkhaugh		Medieval (1869)	M. Nash-Williams	2,714
Alston Moor	St Jude, Knaresdale		Medieval (1833)	M. Nash-Williams	2,714
Alston Moor	SS Mary & Patrick, Lambley		1885	M. Nash-Williams	2,714
Alston Moor	St John the Evangelist, Nenthead		1845	M. Nash-Williams	2,714
Haltwhistle and Greenhead	Holy Cross, Haltwhistle		Medieval	-	4,800
Haltwhistle and Greenhead	St Cuthbert, Greenhead		1827	-	4,800
Haydon Bridge and Beltingham with Henshaw	St Cuthbert, Haydon Bridge		1796	B. Carter	3,310
Haydon Bridge and Beltingham with Henshaw	St Cuthbert, Beltingham		Medieval	B. Carter	3,310
Haydon Bridge and Beltingham with Henshaw	All Hallows, Henshaw		1889	B. Carter	3,310
Hexham	St Andrew, Hexham		Ancient (Medieval)	D. Glover	11,895
St John Lee	St John of Beverley, St John Lee		Medieval (1843)	J. Thompson	2,983
St John Lee	St Aidan, Stagshaw Chapel		1885	J. Thompson	2,983
Warden with Newbrough	St Michael & All Angels, Warden		Ancient (1764)	J. Thompson	2,983
Warden with Newbrough	St Aidan, Fourstones		1892	J. Thompson	2,983
Warden with Newbrough	St Peter, Newbrough		Medieval (1866)	J. Thompson	2,983
Whitley	St Helen, Whitley Chapel		Medieval (1742)	A. Patterson	641

=== Deanery of Morpeth ===
Benefice	Church	Link	Founded (building)	Stip. clergy	Population served
Ashington	Holy Sepulchre, Ashington		1887	C. Groocock	9,592
Bolam with Whalton and Hartburn with Meldon	St Andrew, Bolam		Ancient	J. Mason; F. Sample	2,490
Bolam with Whalton and Hartburn with Meldon	St Andrew, Hartburn		Ancient	J. Mason; F. Sample	2,490
Bolam with Whalton and Hartburn with Meldon	St John the Baptist, Meldon		Medieval	J. Mason; F. Sample	2,490
Bolam with Whalton and Hartburn with Meldon	St Mary Magdalene, Whalton		Medieval	J. Mason; F. Sample	2,490
Kirkwhelpington with Kirkharle and Kirkheaton, and Cambo	Holy Trinity, Cambo		Medieval (1842)	J. Mason; F. Sample	2,490
Kirkwhelpington with Kirkharle and Kirkheaton, and Cambo	St Wilfrid, Kirkharle		Medieval	J. Mason; F. Sample	2,490
Kirkwhelpington with Kirkharle and Kirkheaton, and Cambo	St Bartholomew, Kirkheaton		Medieval (1755)	J. Mason; F. Sample	2,490
Kirkwhelpington with Kirkharle and Kirkheaton, and Cambo	St Bartholomew, Kirkwhelpington		Medieval	J. Mason; F. Sample	2,490
Nether Witton	St Giles, Netherwitton		Medieval	J. Mason; F. Sample	2,490
Bothal and Pegswood with Longhirst	St Andrew, Bothal		Ancient (Medieval)	J. Park	3,711
Bothal and Pegswood with Longhirst	St Margaret, Pegswood			J. Park	3,711
Bothal and Pegswood with Longhirst	St John the Evangelist, Longhirst		1876	J. Park	3,711
Cresswell and Lynemouth	St Bartholomew, Cresswell		1836	A. Munns	4,354
Cresswell and Lynemouth	St Aidan, Lynemouth		1925 (no building)	A. Munns	4,354
Longhorsley	St Helen, Longhorsley		Medieval (1848)	-	1,073
Mitford and Hebron	St Cuthbert, Hebron		Medieval	A. Lamb	1,239
Mitford and Hebron	St Mary Magdalene, Mitford		Medieval	A. Lamb	1,239
Morpeth	St Aidan, Morpeth		1957	S. White	15,145
Morpeth	St Mary the Virgin, Morpeth		Medieval	S. White	15,145
Morpeth	St James the Great, Morpeth		1846	S. White	15,145
Seaton Hirst	St Andrew, Seaton Hirst		1905	D. Twomey	18,578
Seaton Hirst	St John, Seaton Hirst			D. Twomey	18,578
Stannington	St Mary the Virgin, Stannington		Medieval (1871)	C. Pickford	1,287
Ulgham	St John the Baptist, Ulgham		Medieval (1863)	J. Dobson	3,298
Widdrington	Holy Trinity, Widdrington		Medieval	J. Dobson	3,298
Woodhorn with Newbiggin	St Bartholomew, Newbiggin-by-the-Sea		Medieval (1845)	A. O'Grady	6,318

=== Deanery of Norham ===
Benefice	Church	Link	Founded (building)	Stip. clergy	Population served
Berwick	Holy Trinity, Berwick		Medieval (1652)	D. Handley; T. Usher	4,462
Branxton	St Paul, Branxton		Medieval (1849)	G. Kelsey	2,136
Cornhill with Carham	St Helen, Cornhill-on-Tweed		Medieval (1752)	G. Kelsey	2,136
Cornhill with Carham	St Cuthbert, Carham		Medieval (1790)	G. Kelsey	2,136
Norham and Duddo	St Cuthbert, Norham		Medieval	G. Kelsey	2,136
Ford and Etal	St Michael & All Angels, Ford		Medieval	C. Osborn	1,921
Ford and Etal	St Mary the Virgin, Etal		1858	C. Osborn	1,921
Lowick and Kyloe with Ancroft	St Anne, Ancroft		Medieval	C. Osborn	1,921
Lowick and Kyloe with Ancroft	St John the Baptist, Lowick		Medieval (1796)	C. Osborn	1,921
Holy Island	St Mary the Virgin, Holy Island		Medieval	S. Hills	180
Scremerston, Spittal and Tweedmouth	St Peter, Scremerston		1842	-	9,456
Scremerston, Spittal and Tweedmouth	St John the Evangelist, Spittal		1867	-	9,456
Scremerston, Spittal and Tweedmouth	St Bartholomew, Tweedmouth		Ancient (Medieval)	-	9,456

== Dedications ==
This table is drawn from the above lists.

Saint(s)	No.
St Aidan	9
St Alban	1
All Hallows	1
All Saints	6
St Andrew	11
St Anne	2
St Anthony of Egypt	1
Ascension	1
St Augustine	1
St Augustine of Canterbury	1
St Bartholomew	7
St Bede	2
St Benedict	1
Christ Church	4
St Christopher	1
St Columba	1
Holy Cross	3
St Cuthbert	14
St Ebba	1
St Edmund	1
Holy Family	1
St Francis	2
St Gabriel	1
St George	4
St Giles	3
Good Shepherd	2
St Gregory	1
St Helen	3
St Hilda	3
St Hugh	1
St James	6
SS James & Basil	1
St John the Baptist	8
St John the Evangelist	12
St John of Beverley	1
St John (unspecified)	6
St Jude	1
St Lawrence	1
St Luke	2
St Margaret	2
St Mark	2
St Martin	1
St Mary Magdalene	4
St Mary the Virgin inc. Our Lady	23
SS Mary & Michael	1
SS Mary & Patrick	1
St Matthew	3
St Maurice	2
St Michael (& All Angels)	12
SS Michael & Paul	1
St Mungo	1
Holy Nativity	1
St Nicholas	3
St Oswald	2
SS Oswald, Cuthbert & Alfwald	1
St Oswin	1
Holy Paraclete	1
St Paul	7
St Peter	11
SS Peter & Paul	2
SS Philip & Augustine	1
SS Philip & James	2
Holy Saviour	3
Holy Sepulchre	1
St Silas	1
Holy Spirit	1
St Thomas Becket	1
Holy Trinity	10
St Wilfrid	2
No dedication	7
