= Philip Jacob (priest) =

Philip Jacob (28 October 1803 – 20 December 1884) was Archdeacon of Winchester from 1860.

Jacob was the son of John Jacob of Roath Court, Glamorgan. He was educated at Corpus Christi College, Oxford, matriculating in 1821 and graduating B.A. in 1825, M.A. in 1828. He was made deacon in 1827 and ordained priest in 1828, both times by the Bishop of Llandaff. In 1831 he became Rector of Crawley, Hampshire; and in 1834 a Canon of Winchester.

== Notes ==
Church of England titles
Preceded by Joseph Wigram	Archdeacon of Winchester; 1860–1884	Succeeded by George Sumner
