= Lords Spiritual =

Bishops who sit in the House of Lords

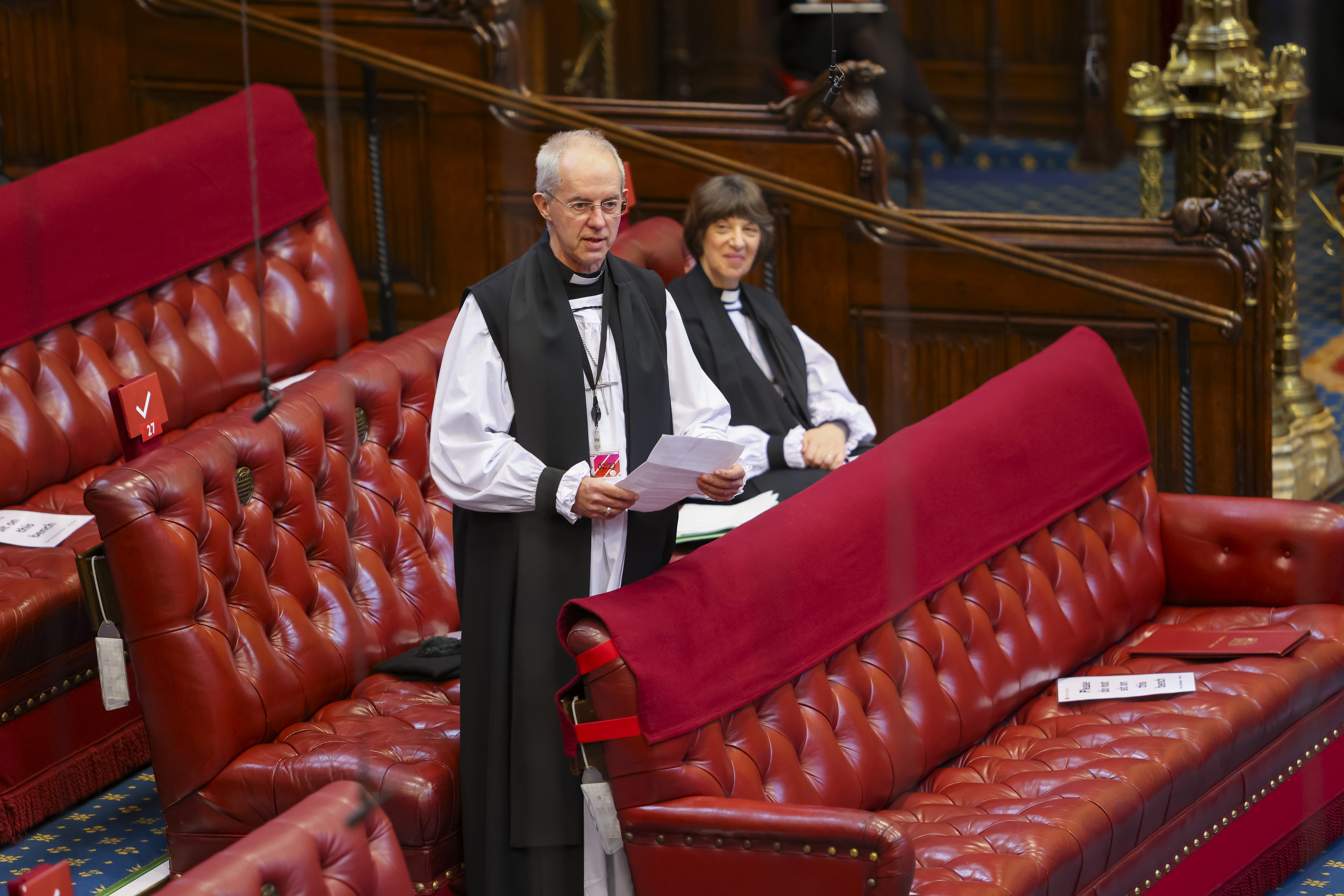
Justin Welby (then-Archbishop of Canterbury) and Rachel Treweek (Bishop of Gloucester) in the House of Lords in 2021

The Lords Spiritual are the bishops of the Church of England who sit in the House of Lords, the upper house of the Parliament of the United Kingdom. As of 1 October 2026, there are 24 current Lords Spiritual, of a maximum of 26.

The incumbent archbishop of Canterbury, archbishop of York, bishop of London, bishop of Durham, and bishop of Winchester are always Lords Spiritual. The remaining 21 Lords Spiritual are typically appointed based on length of service as a diocesan bishop. However, the Lords Spiritual (Women) Act 2015 gives female bishops priority in appointments until May 2030. When a vacancy arises, if a woman is eligible to become a Lord Spiritual then she must be appointed, and if more than one woman is eligible then the appointment is decided on length of service.

The Lords Spiritual are distinct from the Lords Temporal, their secular counterparts who make up the majority of the House of Lords. When a Lord Spiritual retires as a bishop, they may be given a life peerage, which allows them to continue to sit in the Lords as a Lord Temporal. Because only the Church of England is an established church in any country of the United Kingdom, representatives of other churches cannot be appointed Lords Spiritual; this includes the Church in Wales, the Church of Ireland and the Church of Scotland.

== Ranks and titles ==
There are 42 dioceses in the Church of England, each led by a diocesan bishop. The archbishop of Canterbury and the archbishop of York, as Primate of All England and Primate of England, respectively, have oversight over their corresponding ecclesiastical provinces. The occupants of the five "great sees" – Canterbury, York, London, Durham and Winchester – are always Lords Spiritual.

Of the remaining 37 bishops, the 21 most senior usually sit in the House of Lords. Following the first ordinations of female bishops in the Church of England, the normal operation of this rule was suspended by the Lords Spiritual (Women) Act 2015, which provides that until 2030 every woman appointed as a diocesan bishop will automatically become a Lord Spiritual when a vacancy next arises, regardless of seniority, so as to increase the representation of female bishops in the House. Otherwise, seniority is determined by total length of service as an English diocesan bishop (that is to say, it is not lost by translation to another see). The bishop of Sodor and Man and the bishop of Gibraltar in Europe do not sit in the House of Lords regardless of seniority, as their dioceses lie outside both England and the United Kingdom.

Theoretically, the power to elect archbishops and bishops is vested in the diocesan cathedral's college of canons. Practically, however, the choice of the archbishop or bishop is made prior to the election. The prime minister chooses from among a set of nominees proposed by the Crown Nominations Commission, and the sovereign then instructs the college of canons to elect the nominated individual as a bishop or archbishop.

One of the Lords Spiritual is appointed by the archbishop of Canterbury to be the convenor of the bench; he or she coordinates the work of the bishops in the House. David Walker, Bishop of Manchester, was appointed the current convenor effective 1 June 2025.

== Status as peers ==
Even during the early years of the peerage, the position of bishops was unclear. During the reign of King Richard II, the Archbishop of Canterbury declared, "of right and by the custom of the realm of England it belongeth to the Archbishop of Canterbury for the time being as well as others his suffragans, brethren and fellow Bishops, Abbots and Priors and other prelates whatsoever,—to be present in person in all the King's Parliaments whatsoever as Peers of the Realm". The claim was neither agreed nor disagreed to, however, by Parliament.

The Lords Spiritual at first declared themselves entirely outside the jurisdiction of secular authorities; the question of trial in the House of Lords did not arise. When papal authority was great, the king could do little but admit a lack of jurisdiction over the prelates. Later, however, when the power of the pope in England was reduced, the Lords Spiritual came under the authority of the secular courts. The jurisdiction of the common courts was clearly established by the time of Henry VIII, who declared himself head of the Church of England in place of the pope, ending the constitutional power of the Roman Catholic Church in England.

Despite their failure to be tried as temporal peers in the House of Lords, it remained unclear whether the Lords Spiritual were indeed peers. In 1688, the issue arose during the trial of the Seven Bishops—William Sancroft, archbishop of Canterbury; Sir Jonathan Trelawny, 3rd Baronet, bishop of Winchester; Thomas Ken, bishop of Bath and Wells; John Lake, bishop of Chester; William Lloyd, bishop of Worcester; Francis Turner, bishop of Ely; and Thomas White, bishop of Peterborough—by a common jury. The charge was that a petition sent by the bishops constituted seditious libel; the Bishops argued that they had the right to petition the sovereign at any time, while the prosecution charged that such a right was only permissible when Parliament was in session (which, at the time of the delivery of the petition, it was not). If the bishops were only Lords of Parliament, and not peers, their right to petition would be vitiated while Parliament was dissolved. Peers, however, were and still are counsellors of the sovereign whether Parliament is in session or not; therefore, if the bishops were indeed peers, they would be free to send petitions. Since there was no doubt that the petition was actually sent, while the court still ruled the bishops not guilty, it appears that it was taken for granted that the bishops were counsellors of the Crown.

Nevertheless, the Standing Orders of the House of Lords provide, "Bishops to whom a writ of summons has been issued are not Peers but are Lords of Parliament."

== Number ==
In the early history of the Parliament of England, the Lords Spiritual—including the abbots—outnumbered the Lords Temporal. Between 1536 and 1540, however, King Henry VIII dissolved the monasteries, thereby removing the seats of the abbots. For the first time, and from then on, the Lords Spiritual formed a minority in the House of Lords.

In addition to the 21 older dioceses (including four in Wales), Henry VIII created six new ones, of which five survived (see Historical development of Church of England dioceses); the Bishops of the Church of England were excluded in 1642 but regained their seats following the Stuart Restoration; from then until the early 19th century no new sees were created, and the number of Lords Spiritual remained at 26.

Bishops, abbots, and priors of the Church of Scotland historically sat in the Parliament of Scotland. Laymen acquired the monasteries in 1560, following the Scottish Reformation, and therefore those sitting as "abbots" and "priors" were all laymen after that time. Bishops of the Church of Scotland continued to sit, regardless of their religious conformity. Roman Catholic clergy were excluded in 1567, but Episcopal bishops continued to sit until they too were excluded in 1638. The bishops regained their seats following the Restoration, but were again excluded in 1689, following the final abolition of diocesan bishops and the permanent establishment of the Church of Scotland as Presbyterian. There are no longer bishops in the Church of Scotland, and that church has never sent any clergy to sit in the House of Lords at Westminster.

Bishops and archbishops of the Catholic Church sat in the Irish House of Lords as Lords Spiritual from the 13th to 16th centuries; they typically numbered 22, four archbishops and eighteen bishops. After the Reformation (1530s–40s) their place was taken by Church of Ireland clerics. They obtained representation in the Westminster House of Lords after the union of Ireland and Great Britain in 1801. Of the Church of Ireland's ecclesiastics, four (one archbishop and three bishops) were to sit at any one time, with the members rotating at the end of every parliamentary session (which normally lasted about one year). The Church of Ireland, however, was disestablished in 1871, and thereafter ceased to be represented by Lords Spiritual.

The Bishop of Sodor and Man, although a Bishop of the Church of England, has never been included among the Lords Spiritual, as the Isle of Man has never been part of the Kingdom of England or of the United Kingdom. The bishop is the holder of the oldest office in Tynwald (the oldest continuous parliament in the world) and remains an ex officio member of Tynwald Court and of the island's Legislative Council, although this has recently (2020s) been the subject of some controversy.

In the early 19th century, as the population of industrial cities grew, the Church of England proposed two new bishoprics for Leeds and Manchester, but the government refused to increase the number of Lords Spiritual. The Church was reluctant to have two classes of diocesan bishops, and decided to combine other dioceses to allow for the new dioceses. In 1836, the first new bishopric was founded, that of Ripon; but it was balanced out by the merger of the bishoprics of Bristol and Gloucester. (They were later separated again.) The creation of the bishopric of Manchester was also planned but delayed until the dioceses of St Asaph and Bangor could be merged. They never were, but the Bishopric of Manchester Act 1847 went ahead anyway with an alternative way to maintain the 26-bishop limit in the House of Lords: the seniority-based proviso which has been maintained to this day. However, the Lords Spiritual (Women) Act 2015 gives any woman appointed a diocesan bishop in England during the next decade priority in succeeding those among the current 21 who retire during that period. Rachel Treweek became bishop of Gloucester and the first female Lord Spiritual under the Act in 2015; Christine Hardman became the second later that year.

In 1920, with the independence of the Church in Wales from the Church of England and its disestablishment, the Welsh bishops stopped being eligible for inclusion.

The 26 seats for the Lords Spiritual make up 3.3 per cent of the total membership of the House of Lords (797 seats, as of 1 October 2026).

== Politics ==
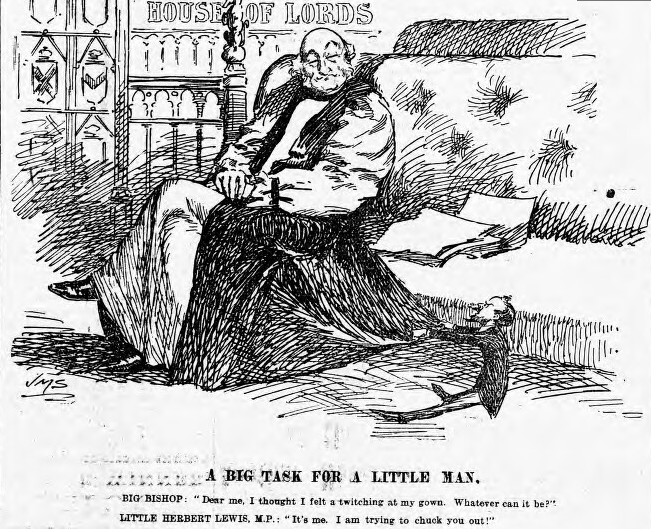
An 1899 cartoon satirising Herbert Lewis's unsuccessful attempts to remove religious peers from the House of Lords

Although the Lords Spiritual have no party affiliation, they do not sit on the crossbenches; their seats are on the Government side of the Lords chamber, also known as the "spiritual side", on the right-hand side of and nearest to the throne. Though in a full sitting the Bishops occupy almost three rows, their front bench is subtly distinguished by being the only one in the House with a single armrest at either end; it is on the front row, close to the throne end of the chamber, indicating their unique status.

By custom, at least one of the bishops reads prayers in each legislative day (a role taken by the Chaplain to the Speaker in the Commons). They often speak in debates; in 2004 Rowan Williams, then archbishop of Canterbury, opened a debate into sentencing legislation. Measures (proposed laws of the Church of England) must be put before the Lords, and the Lords Spiritual have a role in ensuring that this takes place.

== Retired bishops as Lords Temporal ==
Since 1928, most retiring archbishops of Canterbury have been created peers, enabling them to continue to sit in the House as Lords Temporal after their term as Lords Spiritual ended. Archbishops Davidson (1928) and Lang (1942) were created hereditary peers (though both were without male heirs and their titles became extinct on their deaths). Archbishops Fisher (1961), Ramsey (1974), Coggan (1980), Runcie (1991), Carey (2002) and Williams (2013) were created life peers.

Archbishops Lang, Ramsey and Coggan each served as archbishop of York before translation to Canterbury. Successive retiring archbishops of York after them have been created life peers: Archbishops Blanch (1983), Habgood (1995), Hope (2005) and Sentamu (2021).

Robin Eames, the Church of Ireland archbishop of Armagh, was created a life peer in 1995 in recognition of his work for reconciliation and in the Northern Ireland peace process.

Less commonly, other retired diocesans have been created life peers: David Sheppard of Liverpool (1997), Richard Harries of Oxford (2006) and Richard Chartres of London (2017).

== Other religious figures as Lords Temporal ==
Other Christian clergy have been appointed to the House of Lords:

- Anglican priests Lord Beaumont of Whitley (1967), Lord Pilkington of Oxenford (1995), Lord Rook (2025), and Lord Biggar (2025).
- Church of Scotland minister and Moderator of the General Assembly Lord MacLeod of Fuinary (1967)
- Methodist ministers Lord Soper (1965), Baroness Richardson of Calow (1998), and Lord Griffiths of Burry Port (2004), each of whom served as President of the Methodist Conference.
- Free Presbyterian Church of Ulster ministers Lord Bannside (2010) and Lord McCrea of Magherafelt and Cookstown (2018).

There have been no Roman Catholic clergy appointed since the Reformation. However, it was rumoured that Basil Cardinal Hume, the archbishop of Westminster, and his successor, Cormac Cardinal Murphy-O'Connor, were offered peerages by James Callaghan and Margaret Thatcher, and Tony Blair, respectively, but declined. Cardinal Hume later accepted the Order of Merit, a personal appointment of the Queen, shortly before his death. Cardinal Murphy-O'Connor said he had his maiden speech ready, but under Canon 285 of the 1983 Code of Canon Law, ordained Catholic clergy of the Latin Church (by far the largest Catholic denomination in Britain) are discouraged from holding public office of any state other than the Holy See, and secular priests and bishops are completely prohibited from "public offices which entail a participation in the exercise of civil power", which would include a seat in a legislative chamber like the House of Lords.

Jewish rabbis have also been appointed to the House of Lords:

- Chief Rabbis of the United Hebrew Congregations Lord Jakobovits (1988) and Lord Sacks (2009)
- Reform rabbi Baroness Neuberger (2004)

== Reforms ==
=== 2011 proposed House of Lords reform ===
Under the House of Lords Reform Bill 2012, proposed by the Coalition Government, the Lords would be either 80% elected and 20% appointed, or 100% elected. In the former case, there would be 12 Church of England bishops in the reformed upper house. The total of 12 bishops would include the five "named Lords Spiritual" (the archbishops of Canterbury and York and the bishops of Durham, London and Winchester, entitled as they are to sit ex officio) plus seven other "ordinary Lords Spiritual" (diocesan bishops chosen by the church itself through whatever device it deems appropriate). The reduction from 26 to 12 bishops would be achieved in a stepped fashion: up to 21 bishops would remain for the 2015–2020 period and up to 16 for the 2020–2025 period. The ordinary Lords Spirituals' terms would coincide with each "electoral period" (i.e., the period from one election to the next), with the church able to name up to seven to serve during each electoral period. These reforms were later dropped.

=== 2015 change temporarily giving preference to women ===
Under the Lords Spiritual (Women) Act 2015, as extended in 2025, whenever a vacancy arises among the Lords Spiritual during the fifteen years following the Act coming into force (18 May 2015 – 18 May 2030), the vacancy has to be filled by a woman, if one is eligible. The Act does not apply to the sees of Canterbury, York, London, Durham and Winchester, the holders of which automatically have a seat in the House of Lords. Six women have subsequently become Lords Spiritual as a result (one of whom has since retired), as of September 2023. Additionally, Sarah Mullally entered the Lords ex officio when appointed bishop of London in 2018.

== Criticism ==
The presence of the Lords Spiritual in the House of Lords has been criticised, with some media commentators and organisations arguing that the system is outdated and undemocratic. Humanists UK has described it as "unacceptable" that "the UK is the only Western democracy to give religious representatives the automatic right to sit in the legislature". There has also been criticism of the "anomaly of having religious representation from one of the four nations of the United Kingdom but not from the other three"; while the appointment procedures have been described as "secretive and flawed".

Richard Chartres, then Bishop of London, defended the bishops in 2007, saying they are "in touch with a great range of opinions and institutions", and suggesting the inclusion of "leading members in Britain's [other] faith communities".

When the bill to remove the right of hereditary peers to sit in the House of Lords was introduced in parliament, numerous members of the House of Lords said that other elements of Lords reform should be prioritised, such as the removal of the Lords Spiritual, pointing out that the only other sovereign nation where clerics are automatically granted a legislative seat is Iran. Baroness Harman subsequently introduced an amendment to the bill that would mandate the government to introduce proposals to remove the right of bishops who sit as Lords Spiritual, in line with Labour's election manifesto commitment to consult on wider reforms of the upper house; she withdrew her amendment before debate. Lord Birt also introduced an amendment to require proposals to remove the Lords Spiritual, but he withdrew his amendment before debate. Viscount Hailsham introduced an amendment to remove the Lords Spiritual by phasing them out through retirement; Lord Hailsham did not move his amendment at the committee stage debate.

== See also ==
- Anti-clericalism
- Disestablishmentarianism
- Irreligion in the United Kingdom
- List of current members of the House of Lords#Lords Spiritual
- Lord Bishop
- Bishop of Sodor and Man
- Nobles of the Church (Kingdom of Hungary)
- Reform of the House of Lords
- Religion in politics
- Religion in the United Kingdom
- Sacerdotal state
- Secular state
- Secularism in the UK
- Separation of church and state
- State religion
