= Gilpin (surname) =

Gilpin is an English surname and may refer to:

- Betty Gilpin (born 1986), American actress
- Bernard Gilpin (1517–1583), English theologian influential in the emerging Church of England
- Charles Gilpin, multiple people
- Diane Gilpin, developing shipping that uses sustainable energy sources
- George Gilpin (1514–1602), English diplomat and one of Queen Elizabeth I's most trusted agents
- Harry Gilpin (1876–1950), British politician and businessman
- Henry D. Gilpin (1801–1860), American lawyer and Attorney General of the United States, son of Joshua Gilpin
- Jack Gilpin (born 1951), American actor
- John Gilpin, 18th century person who was the basis for William Cowper's ballad The Diverting History of John Gilpin
- John Gilpin (dancer) (1930–1983), English ballet dancer and actor
- John Bernard Gilpin (1810-1892), American-born Canadian physician and naturalist
- Joshua Gilpin (1765–1840) American paper manufacturer
- Kenneth Newcomer Gilpin (1890-1947), American military aviator, horse breeder and politician
- Laura Gilpin (1891–1979), American photographer
- Marc Gilpin (1966–2023), American actor
- Peri Gilpin (born 1961), American actress best known for her work on the television show Frasier
- Sir Richard Gilpin, 1st Baronet (1801–1882), MP for the Bedfordshire Constituency
- Richard Gilpin (1625–1700), English nonconformist minister and physician
- Robert Gilpin (1930–2018), American economist, political scientist and professor
- Sally Gilpin (1938–2008), English ballet dancer and choreographer
- Sawrey Gilpin (1733–1807), English animal painter, illustrator and etcher
- Steve Gilpin (1950–1992), New Zealand singer
- William Gilpin (bishop) (1902–1988), Anglican Bishop of Kingston upon Thames
- William Gilpin (governor) (1813–1894), American explorer, politician, land speculator, soldier and writer, son of Joshua Gilpin
- William Gilpin (priest) (1724–1804, English artist, Anglican cleric, schoolmaster and author, best known as one of the originators of the idea of the picturesque
- William Sawrey Gilpin (1762–1843), English artist, drawing master and landscape designer
