= William Gilpin =

William Gilpin may refer to:

- William Gilpin (priest) (1724–1804), English watercolour artist, writer, and clergyman
- William Sawrey Gilpin (1762–1843), English artist
- William Gilpin (governor) (1813–1894), first governor of the Colorado Territory
- William Gilpin (bishop) (1902–1988), English Anglican bishop of Kingston

== See also ==
- Gilpin (disambiguation)
