= Richard Cheetham =

The Right Reverend Richard Cheetham
- Bishop of Kingston
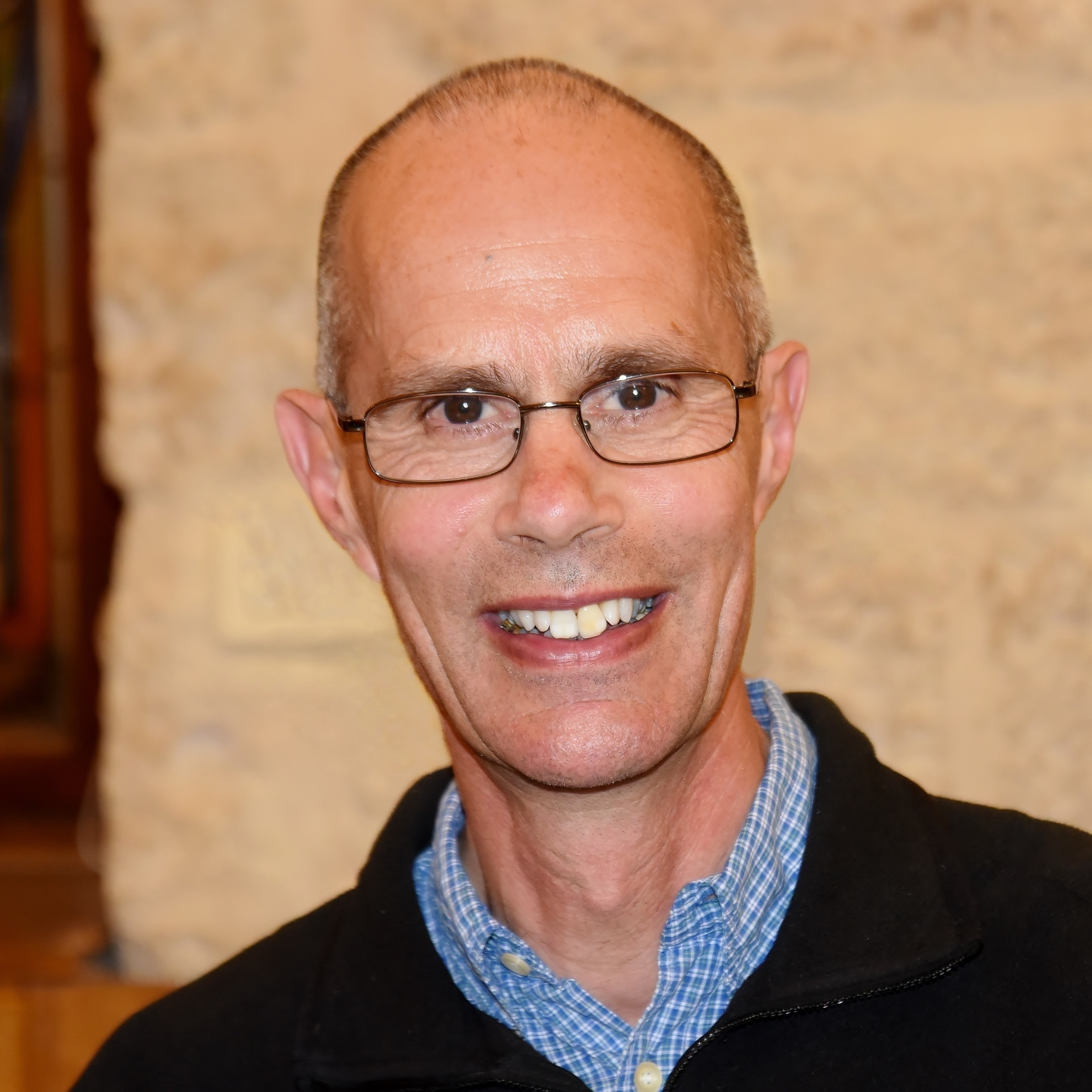
- Bishop Cheetham in Jerusalem, 2019
- Church: Church of England
- Diocese: Diocese of Southwark
- In office: 2002–2022
- Predecessor: Peter Price
- Other post: Archdeacon of St Albans (1999–2002)

Orders
- Ordination: 1987 (deacon); 1988 (priest) by Alec Graham
- Consecration: 17 October 2002 by George Carey

Personal details
- Born: 18 August 1955 (age 71)
- Denomination: Anglican
- Spouse: Felicity (m. 1977)
- Children: two
- Profession: formerly investment analyst; teacher
- Education: Corpus Christi College, Oxford

Richard Ian Cheetham (born 18 August 1955) is a retired Church of England bishop and former teacher. He served as the area Bishop of Kingston in the Diocese of Southwark, 2002–2022.

== Early life ==
He was educated at Kingston Grammar School. He studied physics and philosophy at Corpus Christi College, Oxford, graduating with a Bachelor of Arts (BA) degree. He remained at the University of Oxford to study for a Postgraduate Certificate in Education (PGCE).

Having qualified, he taught science at a comprehensive school in Richmond, North Yorkshire, from 1978 to 1980. He then moved to Eton College, Windsor, where he was Assistant Physics Master from 1980 to 1983. After five years teaching, he left the profession to become an investment analyst.

== Church career ==
Cheetham left his career and in 1985 began preparation for ordination at Ripon College Cuddesdon. Having completed a Certificate in Theology, he was made a deacon in the Church of England at Petertide (5 July) 1987. The following year, at Petertide (3 July 1988), he was ordained a priest; both times by Alec Graham, Bishop of Newcastle.

He began his career as curate at Holy Cross, Fenham, Newcastle upon Tyne and from 1990 until 1999 he was vicar of St Augustine of Canterbury's Church, Luton and additionally (from 1995) Rural Dean of the area. From 1999 to 2002 he was Archdeacon of St Albans. On 17 October 2002, at Southwark Cathedral, he was one (with David Hamid and David Hawkins) of the last three people to be ordained and consecrated a bishop by George Carey before his retirement as Archbishop of Canterbury; Cheetham was then enthroned as area Bishop of Kingston in Southwark Cathedral on 27 October 2002. As the senior suffragan bishop in post at the time of Tom Butler's retirement on 5 March 2010, Cheetham served as Acting Bishop of Southwark from then until his fellow suffragan Christopher Chessun became Bishop of Southwark on 17 January 2011.

In 1999, Cheetham completed his Doctor of Philosophy degree (PhD) as an external student of King's College London. His thesis was entitled, 'The nature and status of religious belief in contemporary Britain (with particular reference to the concept of 'truth') as reflected by acts of collective worship in a sample of Luton schools since the 1988 Education Reform Act'. A book, Collective Worship: issues and opportunities, followed in 2004. He became an Honorary Research Fellow of King's College London in 2011. Cheetham is also a keen sportsman.

Cheetham is Chair of the Southwark Diocesan Board of Education, Anglican President of the Christian Muslim Forum, Patron of the Fircroft Trust, the Curriculum for Cohesion and Kingston Bereavement Service. Until 2012 he was a member of the Roehampton University Council. He is President of the YMCA London South West who have a large multi-function building in Surbiton and became Chair of the British Regional Committee of St. George's College, Jerusalem, in May 2013.

He announced on 8 February 2022 that he would resign his See and retire effective 17 October 2022, the twentieth anniversary of his consecration.

As of 8h March 2023, it has been announced that he will take a position as Assistant Bishop in the Diocese of Guildford.

== Styles ==
- The Reverend Richard Cheetham (1987 – February 1999)
- The Venerable Richard Cheetham (February – October 1999)
- The Venerable Doctor Richard Cheetham (October 1999 – 2002)
- The Right Reverend Doctor Richard Cheetham (2002–present)

== Sources ==
- Debrett's People of Today 2008. London: Debrett's. 2007. ISBN 978-1-870520-95-9. OCLC 764415351.

Church of England titles
Preceded by Peter Price	Bishop of Kingston; 2002–2022	Martin Gainsborough
