= John Herbert, 8th Earl of Powis =

British peer (born 1952)

The Right Honourable The Earl of Powis

Member of the House of Lords
- Lord Temporal
- In office 13 August 1993 – 11 November 1999 as a hereditary peer
- Preceded by: The 7th Earl of Powis
- Succeeded by: Seat abolished (Note: Pursuant to the House of Lords Act 1999.)

Personal details
- Born: John George Herbert; 19 May 1952 (age 73)
- Party: Crossbench

John George Herbert, 8th Earl of Powis (born 19 May 1952), styled Viscount Clive between 1988 and 1993, is a British peer. He sat in the House of Lords between 1993 and 1999.

== Early life ==
Herbert is the son of George Herbert, 7th Earl of Powis, and the Hon. Katharine Odeyne de Grey. Among his siblings are Michael Clive Herbert, Peter James Herbert, Edward David Herbert, Lorraine Elizabeth Herbert, and Nicola Wendy Herbert.

His paternal grandparents were the Right Rev. Percy Herbert, Bishop of Norwich, and the former Hon. Elaine Orde-Powlett (a daughter of William Orde-Powlett, 5th Baron Bolton). His maternal grandparents were Lt. Col. George de Grey, 8th Baron Walsingham, and the former Hyacinth Lambart Bouwens.

He was expelled from his school, Wellington College, at the age of 14 or 15, and says that he became anti-imperialist at that time. He later graduated from McMaster University, in Ontario, Canada, with a Master of Arts and, in 1994, with a Doctor of Philosophy.

== Career ==
Herbert was an assistant professor at Redeemer College in Hamilton, Ontario, between 1990 and 1992.

Upon the death of his father on 13 August 1993, he succeeded as the 8th Earl of Powis in addition to a number of other subsidiary titles.

In 2021, during the second episode of Empire State of Mind, Lord Powis told journalist Sathnam Sanghera that he wished a statue of his ancestor, Clive of India, was not in the centre of Shrewsbury.

== Personal life ==
Herbert married Marijke Sofia Guther, daughter of Maarten Nanne Guther and Woutertje Bouw, in 1977. They have four children:

- Jonathan Nicholas William Herbert, Viscount Clive (born 1979)
- Lady Stephanie Moira Christina Herbert (born 1982)
- Lady Samantha Julie Esther Herbert (born 1988)
- Hon. Alexander Sebastian George Herbert (born 1994)

"The Herbert family still maintain part of Powis Castle, under arrangement with the National Trust." The Castle contains "an array of Mughal artifacts picked up by Clive [of India] and his family".

== Notes ==
Peerage of the United Kingdom
Preceded by George Herbert	Earl of Powis; 1993–present Member of the House of Lords (1993–1999)	Incumbent; Heir apparent: Jonathan Herbert, Viscount Clive
Preceded by George Herbert	Baron Herbert of Chirbury; 1993–present	Incumbent; Heir apparent: Jonathan Herbert, Viscount Clive
Peerage of Great Britain
Preceded by George Herbert	Baron Clive of Walcot; 1993–present	Incumbent; Heir apparent: Jonathan Herbert, Viscount Clive
Peerage of Ireland
Preceded by George Herbert	Baron Clive of Plassey; 1993–present	Incumbent; Heir apparent: Jonathan Herbert, Viscount Clive
