= George Herbert, 7th Earl of Powis =

British peer (1925–1993)

The Right Honourable The Earl of Powis

Member of the House of Lords
- Lord Temporal
- In office 7 October 1988 – 13 August 1993
- Preceded by: The 6th Earl of Powis
- Succeeded by: The 8th Earl of Powis

Personal details
- Born: George William Herbert; 4 June 1925
- Died: 13 August 1993 (aged 68)

George William Herbert, 7th Earl of Powis (4 June 1925 – 13 August 1993), was a British peer who sat in the House of Lords between 1988 and 1993.

== Family and background ==
Herbert was born on 4 June 1925. He was the eldest son of the Hon. Elaine Letitia Algitha Orde-Powlett and Rt. Rev. Percy Mark Herbert, Bishop of Kingston, Bishop of Blackburn and Bishop of Norwich, who served as Clerk of the Closet. Among his younger siblings (who were granted the rank of earl's children in 1991) were Hon. David Mark Herbert (chief executive of Studio Vista), Lady Elizabeth Barbarina Herbert (wife of Maj. Hubert Robert Holden of Sibdon Castle, the High Sheriff of Shropshire), and the Hon. Andrew Clive Herbert.

His paternal grandparents were Sybella Augusta Herbert (née Milbank) and Major General the Hon. William Henry Herbert, Mayor of Shrewsbury (and younger son of Edward Herbert, 2nd Earl of Powis, and Lucy Herbert, Countess of Powis). His maternal grandparents were William Orde-Powlett, 5th Baron Bolton, and Elizabeth née Gibson, a daughter of the 1st Baron Ashbourne.

He was educated at Eton College before attending Trinity College, Cambridge, from where he graduated with a Bachelor of Arts in 1949.

== Career ==
Between school and university, Herbert served in the Rifle Brigade from 1943, during the Second World War, until demobilised in 1947. Herbert was appointed a Fellow of the Land Agents' Society and of the Royal Institute of Chartered Surveyors and worked as a land agent on estates in Bedfordshire, Norfolk and Suffolk before returning to Shropshire in 1970 to farm his estate in Chirbury, described as "straddling the Welsh border" and "let his cottages in Chirbury at low rents, safeguarding the village school, and led an appeal to restore the parish church."

Upon the death of his bachelor second cousin, Christian Herbert (both great-grandchildren of the 2nd Earl), on 7 October 1988, he succeeded as the 7th Earl of Powis, in addition to a number of subsidiary titles including the Baron Clive of Plassey, Baron Clive of Walcot, Baron Herbert of Chirbury, Viscount Clive of Ludlow and the Baron Powis of Powis Castle.

== Personal life ==
On 26 July 1949, Herbert was married to the Hon. Katharine Odeyne de Grey, daughter of Lt.-Col. George de Grey, 8th Baron Walsingham and the former Hyacinth Lambart Bouwens. Together, they lived at Marrington Hall in Chirbury, Shropshire, and were the parents of:

- John George Herbert, 8th Earl of Powis (b. 1952), who married Marijke Sofia Guther, daughter of Maarten Nanne Guther, in 1977. They have four children.
- Hon. Michael Clive Herbert (b. 1954), who married Susan Mary Baker, daughter of Guy Baker, in 1978. They had three children.
- Hon. Peter James Herbert (b. 1955), who married Terri McBride, daughter of Sean McBride, in 1978. They had two daughters and a son, he then remarried and had another two children.
- Hon. Edward David Herbert (1958–2008), who married Diana Christine Shore, daughter of Cedric Shore, in 1985. They have two children.
- Lady Lorraine Elizabeth Herbert (b. 1961), who married Roger Samuel Jones in 1981. They have two children.
- Lady Nicola Wendy Herbert (b. 1962), who married Robert Thomas Buxton in 1985. They have one daughter, Kim.

After being ill with cancer for eleven months, Lord Powis died at the Royal Shrewsbury Hospital in Shropshire on 13 August 1993 at age 68.

Peerage of the United Kingdom
Preceded by Christian Herbert	Earl of Powis; 1988–1993; Member of the House of Lords (1988–1993)	Succeeded by John Herbert
Preceded by Christian Herbert	Baron Herbert of Chirbury; 1988–1993	Succeeded by John Herbert
Peerage of Great Britain
Preceded by Christian Herbert	Baron Clive of Walcot; 1988–1993	Succeeded by John Herbert
Peerage of Ireland
Preceded by Christian Herbert	Baron Clive of Plassey; 1988–1993	Succeeded by John Herbert
