= Lord Price =

Lord Price may be:

- Peter Price (bishop) (born 1944), retired Anglican bishop
- Mark Price, Baron Price (born 1961), British businessman
