= Gilpin =

Gilpin may refer to:

== People ==
- Gilpin (surname), including a list of people with the surname

== Places ==
=== United States ===
- Gilpin, Kentucky, an unincorporated community in Casey County
- Gilpin, Nevada, an unincorporated community in Storey County
- Gilpin, Richmond, Virginia, a neighborhood
- Gilpin County, Colorado
- Gilpin Peak, a mountain in Colorado
- Gilpin Township, Armstrong County, Pennsylvania

=== Other places ===
- River Gilpin, Cumbria, England
- Gilpin, British Columbia, a community in Boundary Country, British Columbia

== Other uses ==
- Gilpin Airlines, a small airline serving California, Arizona, and the Mexican states of Sonora and Baja California in the 1930s
- Gilpin Baronets, a title in the Baronetage of the United Kingdom
- Gilpin Homestead, Chadds Ford, Delaware County, Pennsylvania, on the US National Register of Historic Places
- Gilpin Railroad, Colorado, United States (1887–1917)

== See also ==
- John Gilpin, an 1852 clipper ship
