= Samuel Taylor (bishop) =

Samuel Mumford Taylor (25 August 1859- 30 November 1929) was the second Bishop of Kingston.

Taylor was educated at University College London and ordained in 1885. After a curacy at St John the Evangelist's Leeds he became the first vicar of St Aidan's (Bishop Woodford Memorial) Leeds; He was then a canon residentiary and the precentor at Southwark Cathedral, then Archdeacon of Southwark. His penultimate post, until his resignation in 1921, was as a suffragan bishop. Finally he was appointed to lead the worship for St George's Chapel at Windsor Castle.

Church of England titles
Preceded by Cecil Hook	Bishop of Kingston; 1915– 1921	Succeeded by Percy Mark Herbert
