= Hundred of Kingston =

Historical division of Surrey, England

Coordinates: 51.412°N 0.300°W

Kingston
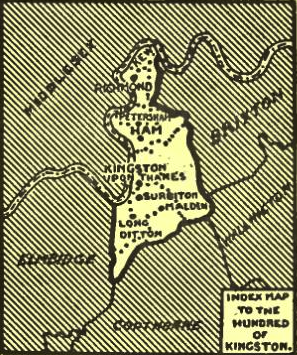
- Area
  - 1871: 10,273 acres (41.57 km^{2})
- Population
  - 1851: 18,194
  - 1861: 22,997
- Status: Hundred

The Hundred of Kingston or Kingston Hundred was an ancient hundred in the north east of the county of Surrey, England. Its area has been mostly absorbed by the growth of London and its name currently refers to both the suburban town of Kingston upon Thames and the larger Royal Borough of Kingston upon Thames. Its former area now corresponds to that borough and part of the London Borough of Richmond upon Thames in Greater London and part of the borough of Elmbridge in Surrey. It bordered the Hundred of Brixton to the east, the Hundred of Elmbridge to the south, and to the west and north by the River Thames.

It contained the following parishes:

- Chessington (until 1610)
- Esher (part)
- Ham with Hatch (created in 1866 from part of Kingston upon Thames)
- Hook (created in 1866 from part of Kingston upon Thames)
- Kew
- Kingston upon Thames
- Long Ditton
- Malden
- Petersham
- Richmond
- Thames Ditton (part, from 1769)

In Domesday Book it is recorded as containing Kingston, Petersham, Long Ditton, Thames Ditton, and Malden. In 1871 the hundred is described as containing six parishes and part of another. It was cut into two divisions; the first was 6,655 acres (26.93 km^{2}) and the second was 3,618. The population in 1851 was 15,773 in the first division and 2,421 in the second. Ten years later the population was 22,997; an increase of over 2,000.
