= Percy Herbert (bishop) =

British Anglican bishop (1885–1968)

The Right Reverend Percy Herbert KCVO DD
- Bishop of Norwich
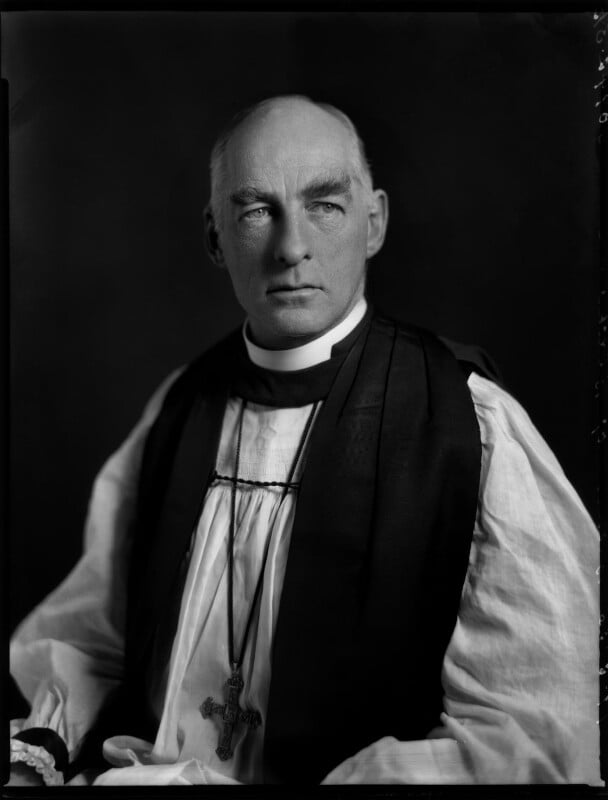
- Herbert in 1936
- Church: Church of England
- Diocese: Diocese of Norwich
- In office: 1942–59
- Predecessor: Bertram Pollock
- Successor: William Fleming
- Other post: Clerk of the Closet
- Previous posts: Bishop of Kingston (1922–26); Bishop of Blackburn (1927–42)

Personal details
- Born: Percy Mark Herbert; 25 April 1885 Shrewsbury, Shropshire
- Died: 22 January 1968 (aged 82) London
- Denomination: Anglicanism
- Parents: Sybella Augusta Milbank; Hon. William Henry Herbert
- Spouse: Hon. Elaine Orde-Powlett (after 1922)
- Children: 4
- Education: Rugby School; Trinity College, Cambridge

Percy Mark Herbert KCVO (24 April 1885 – 22 January 1968) was the first Bishop of Blackburn from 1927 then Bishop of Norwich from 1942 to 1959. He was the Clerk of the Closet from 1942 to 1963.

== Early life ==
Percy was born in Shrewsbury, Shropshire, at Prestfelde, the second son of Sybella Augusta (née Milbank) Herbert and Maj.-Gen. Hon. William Henry Herbert, the Mayor of Shrewsbury who later lived at Winsley Hall, near Shrewsbury. His elder brother, Henry James Herbert, died unmarried in 1911.

His paternal grandparents were Edward Herbert, 2nd Earl of Powis and the former Lady Lucy Graham (a daughter of James Graham, 3rd Duke of Montrose). His maternal grandparents were Mark William Vane Milbank (grandson of William Vane, 1st Duke of Cleveland) and Barbarina Sophia Farquhar (a daughter of Sir Thomas Farquhar, 2nd Baronet).

Herbert was educated at Rugby School and Trinity College, Cambridge, graduating in 1907. He later earned a Doctor of Divinity from Trinity College in 1922.

== Career ==
Ordained priest in 1909, he served for a period as parish curate at Rugby, Warwickshire until 1915 before he was appointed Vicar of St George's, Camberwell, and Warden of the Trinity Cambridge Mission until 1922, additionally serving as Rural Dean of the area from 1918. In 1921 he was appointed Bishop of Kingston and served as Chaplain to King George V between 1921 and 1922. He was Archdeacon of Southwark and Bishop Suffragan of Kingston upon Thames between 1922 and 1926. He held the office of Bishop of Norwich between 1942 and 1959, where he presided over a number of prominent weddings, including Lady Anne Coke and Colin Tennant in 1956.

As a bishop he was an outspoken opponent of legislation permitting gambling and remarriage of divorced persons in church. An active Freemason, he was Provincial Grand Master for Norfolk.

After retiring from his post as Bishop of Norwich, Herbert became Rector of St Mary Magdalene Church, Sandringham. It was at that church in 1961 where he baptised the Honourable Diana Spencer (later Princess of Wales). He was Clerk of the Closet to King George VI from 1942 to 1952 and then to Queen Elizabeth II from 1952 to 1963.

He served as Chaplain and Sub-Prelate of the Order of St John of Jerusalem from 1939, and appointed Knight Commander, Royal Victorian Order in 1954.

== Personal life ==
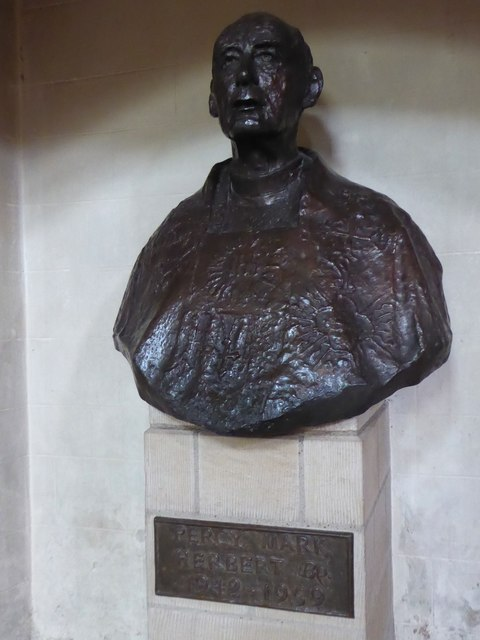
Bust of Herbert in Norwich Cathedral

On 19 September 1922, he married the Hon. Elaine Letitia Algitha Orde-Powlett, daughter of William Orde-Powlett, 5th Baron Bolton and the former Hon. Elizabeth Gibson (a daughter of Edward Gibson, 1st Baron Ashbourne). Together, they had four children (who were granted the rank of earl's children in 1991):

- George William Herbert, 7th Earl of Powis (1925–1993), who married Hon. Katharine Odeyne de Grey, daughter of Lt.-Col. George de Grey, 8th Baron Walsingham and Hyacinth Lambart Bouwens, in 1949.
- Hon. David Mark Herbert (1927–1996), chief executive of Studio Vista who married Monica Brenda Swann, daughter of Laurence Edmund Swann, in 1955.
- Lady Elizabeth Barbarina Herbert (b. 1928), who married Maj. Hubert Robert Holden, the High Sheriff of Shropshire and son of Robert Millington Holden, in 1948.
- Hon. Andrew Clive Herbert (1933–2000), who married Carol Mae Charlton, daughter of John Charlton, in 1963. They divorced in 1971 and he married Edith Ann Dominguez, daughter of Alexander Dominguez, in 1983.

Above all "a pastoral bishop", Herbert, who ultimately lived in retirement at Ascot, Berkshire, died at the Royal Masonic Hospital in London, aged 82. Through his eldest son, he is a grandfather of John Herbert, 8th Earl of Powis.

Church of England titles
Preceded by Samuel Mumford Taylor	Bishop of Kingston; 1922–1926	Succeeded by Frederick Ochterloney Taylor Hawkes
Preceded by New creation	Bishop of Blackburn; 1927–1942	Succeeded by Wilfred Marcus Askwith
Preceded by Cyril Garbett	Clerk of the Closet; 1942–1963	Succeeded by Roger Plumpton Wilson
Preceded by Bertram Pollock	Bishop of Norwich; 1942–1959	Succeeded by William Fleming
