= Alec Graham =

English Anglican bishop (1929–2021)

- Bishop of Newcastle
- Church: Church of England
- Diocese: Diocese of Newcastle
- In office: 1981–1997
- Predecessor: Ronald Bowlby
- Successor: Martin Wharton
- Other posts: honorary assistant bishop in Carlisle (1997–2021); Bishop of Bedford; 1977–1981

Orders
- Ordination: 1956
- Consecration: 1977

Personal details
- Born: 7 August 1929
- Died: 9 May 2021 (aged 91) Butterwick, Cumbria, England
- Denomination: Anglican
- Education: St John's College, Oxford

Andrew Alexander Kenny Graham (7 August 1929 – 9 May 2021) was an English Anglican bishop.

Graham was educated at Yardley Court, Tonbridge School and St John's College, Oxford. After studies at Ely Theological College he was ordained in 1956. He was ordained in the Church of England: made a deacon on Trinity Sunday 1955 (5 June) and ordained a priest the Trinity following (27 May 1956), both times by George Bell, Bishop of Chichester, at Chichester Cathedral. His first post was as a curate at Hove from where he moved to be a lecturer at Worcester College, Oxford. After time as warden of Lincoln Theological College he was appointed the Bishop of Bedford in 1977. He was consecrated a bishop on 31 March 1977, by Donald Coggan, Archbishop of Canterbury at Westminster Abbey.

With his nomination on 21 May and confirmation on 29 June 1981, he was translated to Bishop of Newcastle where he stayed for sixteen years. In retirement he was an honorary assistant bishop in the Diocese of Carlisle.

Graham died at his home in Butterwick, on 9 May 2021, at the age of 91.
