= Kingston upon Thames =

Town in south-west London, England

Coordinates: 51°24′37″N 0°17′58″W

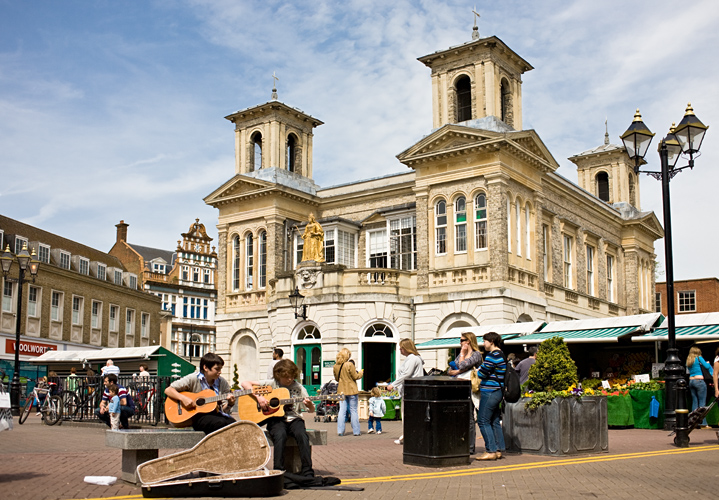
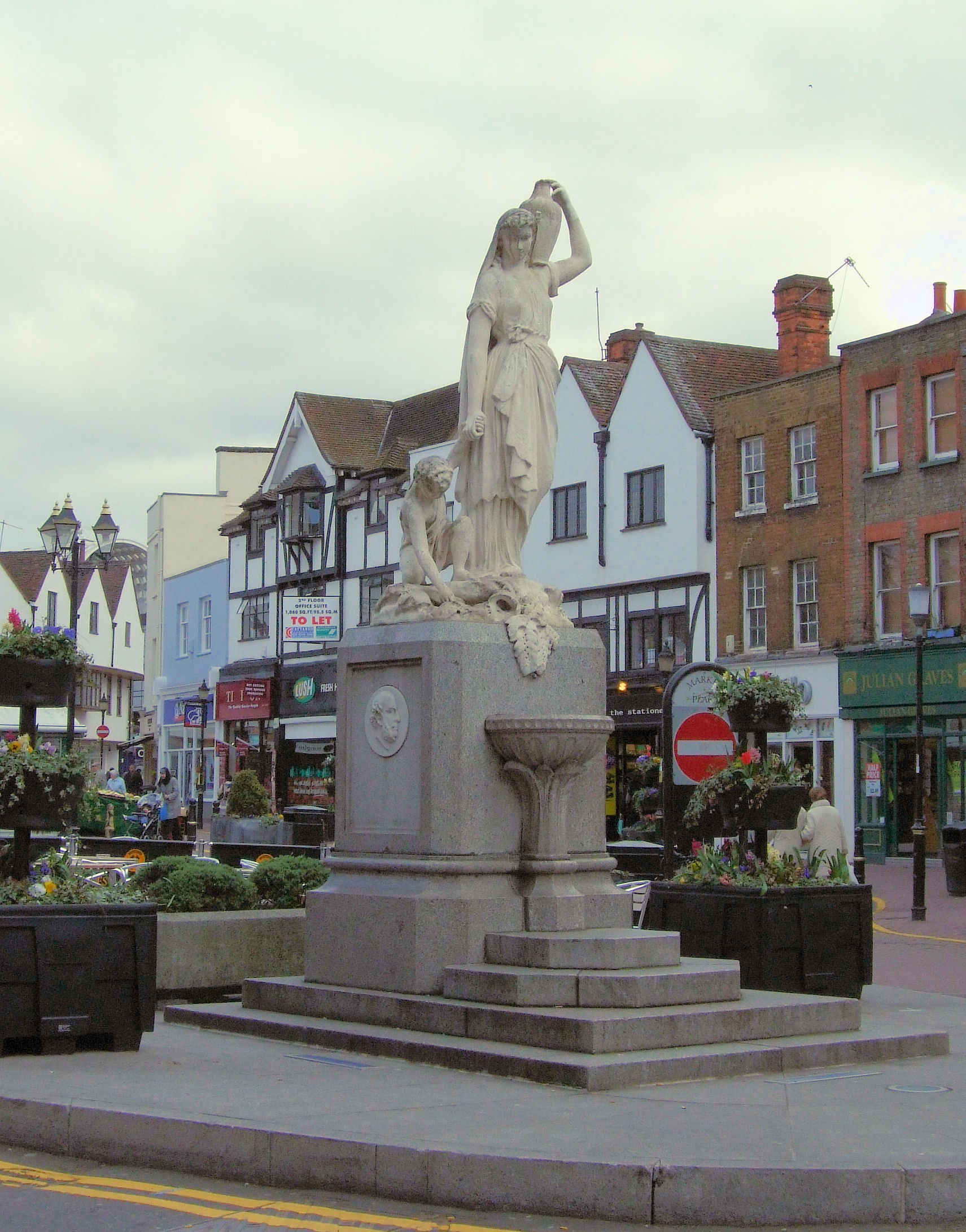
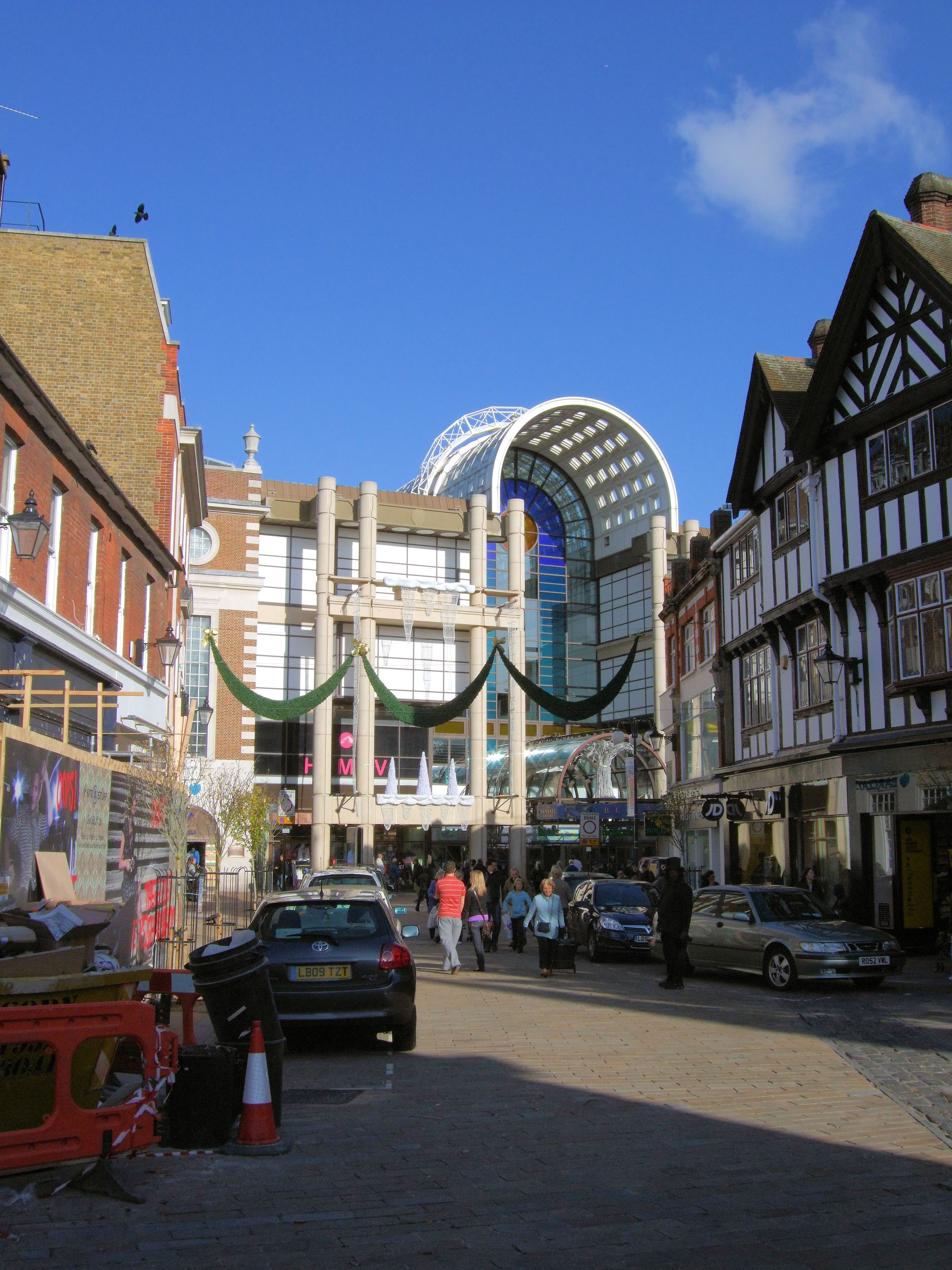
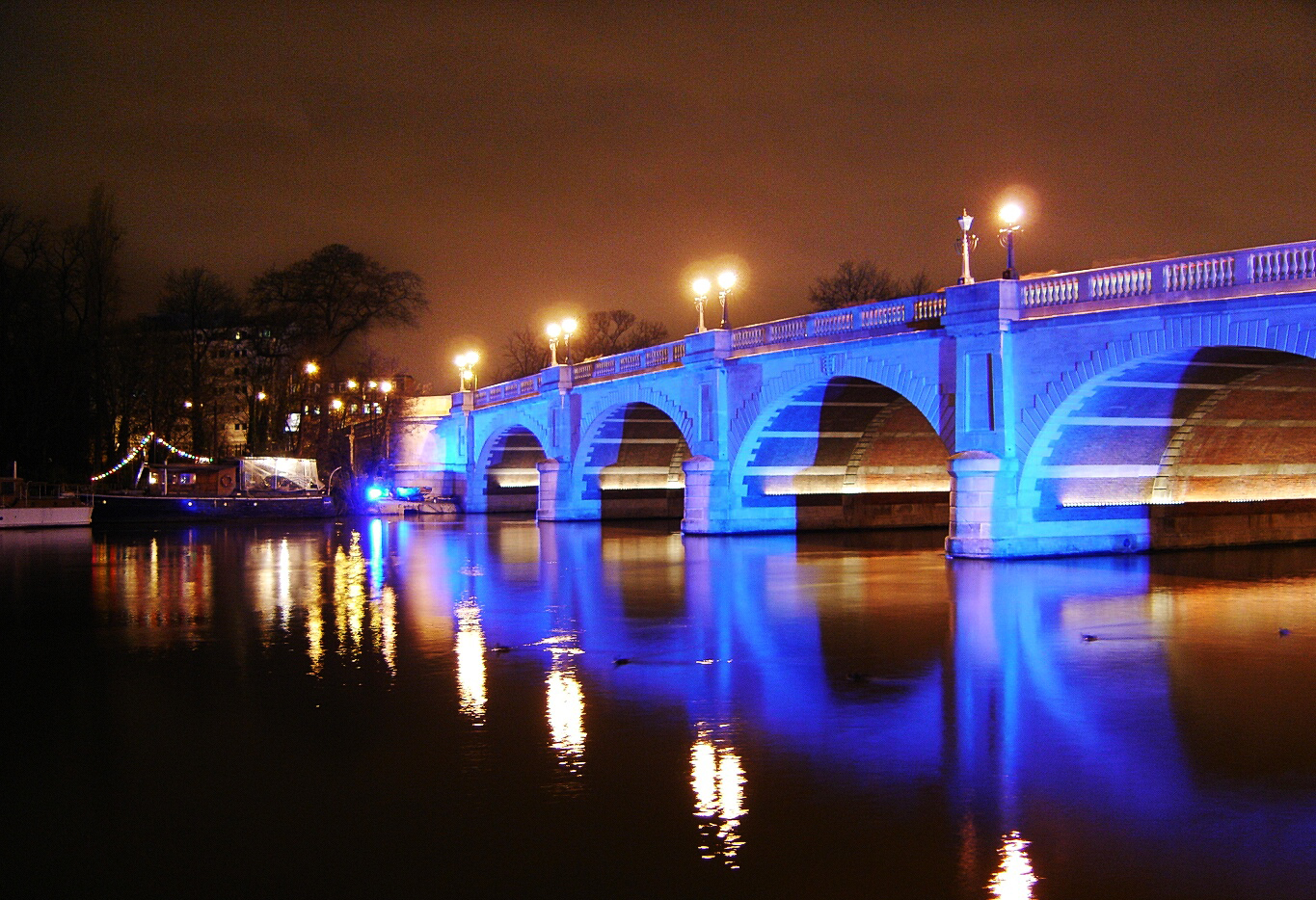
- Clockwise from top: Kingston Market Square; Church Street; Kingston Bridge at night; Shrubsole Memorial water fountain

- Location within Greater London
- Population: 54,925 (Post town); 168,063 (Borough)
- OS grid reference: TQ182693
  - Charing Cross: 10.0 mi (16.1 km) NE
- London borough: Kingston
- Ceremonial county: Greater London
- Region: London
- Country: England
- Sovereign state: United Kingdom
- Post town: KINGSTON UPON THAMES
- Postcode district: KT1, KT2
- Dialling code: 020
- Police: Metropolitan
- Fire: London
- Ambulance: London
- UK Parliament: Kingston and Surbiton; Richmond Park
- London Assembly: South West

Kingston upon Thames, colloquially known as Kingston, is a town in the Royal Borough of Kingston upon Thames, south-west London, England. It is situated on the River Thames, 10 miles (16 km) south-west of Charing Cross. It is an ancient market town, notable as the place where some Saxon kings were crowned.

Historically in the county of Surrey, the ancient parish of Kingston covered both the town itself and a large surrounding area. The town was an ancient borough, having been formally incorporated in 1441, with a long history prior to that as a royal manor. From 1836 until 1965 the town formed the Municipal Borough of Kingston-upon-Thames. From 1893 to 2020 Kingston was the seat of Surrey County Council. The town became part of Greater London in 1965, when the modern borough was also created as one of the 32 London boroughs.

Kingston is identified as a metropolitan centre in the London Plan and is one of the biggest retail centres in the UK, receiving 18 million visitors a year. It is also home to Kingston University.

The Kingston upon Thames post town corresponds to the KT1 and KT2 postcodes. The wider borough also includes the post towns of New Malden, Surbiton, Chessington, parts of Worcester Park and peripheral parts of several other post towns based outside the borough. The Kingston upon Thames post town roughly corresponds to the six wards of Canbury Gardens, Coombe Hill, Kingston Gate, Kingston Town, Norbiton and Tudor, which had a combined population of 54,925 at the 2021 census, while the borough overall counted 168,063.

== Toponymy ==
Kingston was called Cyninges tun in 838 AD, Chingestune in 1086, Kingeston in 1164, Kyngeston super Tamisiam in 1321 and Kingestowne upon Thames in 1589. The name means 'the king's manor or estate' from the Old English words cyning and tun. It belonged to the king in Saxon times and was the earliest royal borough.

There was historically some variation between authorities as to whether Kingston was 'on' or 'upon' Thames, and whether the name should be hyphenated or not. The Post Office initially adopted 'Kingston-on-Thames', the Ordnance Survey used 'Kingston upon Thames', and the old borough council preferred the hyphenated 'Kingston-upon-Thames'. As late as 1959 the borough council was petitioning the other bodies to standardise the name as 'Kingston-upon-Thames'. The London Borough created in 1965 used the form 'Kingston upon Thames' without hyphens, since when that form has been used by the council, Ordnance Survey, and as the post town.

== History ==
=== Early history ===
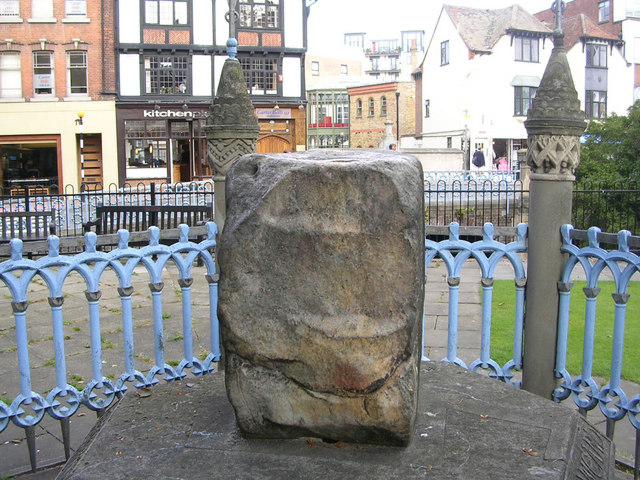
The Coronation Stone in the grounds of the Guildhall

The first surviving record of Kingston is from AD 838 as the site of a meeting between King Egbert of Wessex and Ceolnoth, Archbishop of Canterbury. Kingston lay on the boundary between the ancient kingdoms of Wessex and Mercia, until in the early tenth century when King Æthelstan united both to create the kingdom of England. According to the Anglo-Saxon Chronicle, two tenth-century kings were consecrated in Kingston: Æthelstan (925), and Æthelred the Unready (978). There are certain other kings who are said to have been crowned there, but for whom the evidence (including the writings of Florence of Worcester and Ralph de Diceto) is less substantial: Edward the Elder (902), Edmund I (939), Eadred (946), Eadwig (956), Edgar the Peaceful (c. 960) and Edward the Martyr (975). It was later thought that the coronations were conducted in the Chapel of St Mary, which collapsed in 1730. Tradition dating to the 18th century holds that a large stone recovered from the ruins played a part in the coronations. It was initially used as a mounting block, but in 1850 it was moved to a more dignified place in the market before finally being moved to its current location in the grounds of the Guildhall.

From Medieval times Shrovetide Football was played annually at Kingston upon Thames and in surrounding towns including Richmond and Twickenham. The windows of the houses and shops were boarded up and from 12 noon the inhabitants would kick several balls around the town before retiring to the public houses. The last game was played in 1866, by which time the urban development of the town meant it caused too much damage and the custom was outlawed.

=== Local government ===
Kingston upon Thames formed an ancient parish in the Kingston hundred of Surrey. The parish of Kingston upon Thames covered a large area including numerous chapelries and townships which subsequently became separate parishes, including Hook, Kew, New Malden, Petersham, Richmond, Surbiton, Thames Ditton and East Molesey.

Kingston was a royal manor. It was granted various charters allowing it the right to hold markets and fairs, with the oldest surviving charter being from King John in 1208. A subsequent charter in 1441 formally incorporated the town as a borough.

The borough covered a much smaller area than the ancient parish, although as new parishes were split off the borough and parish eventually became identical in 1894. The borough was reformed to become a municipal borough in 1836 under the Municipal Corporations Act 1835, becoming the Municipal Borough of Kingston-upon-Thames. It had been long been known as a royal borough through custom; its right to the title was formally confirmed by George V in 1927. Kingston upon Thames was the seat of Surrey County Council from 1893, when it moved from Newington to a new headquarters at County Hall. The county council remained based at County Hall until 2020, despite Kingston having been removed from its administrative area in 1965.

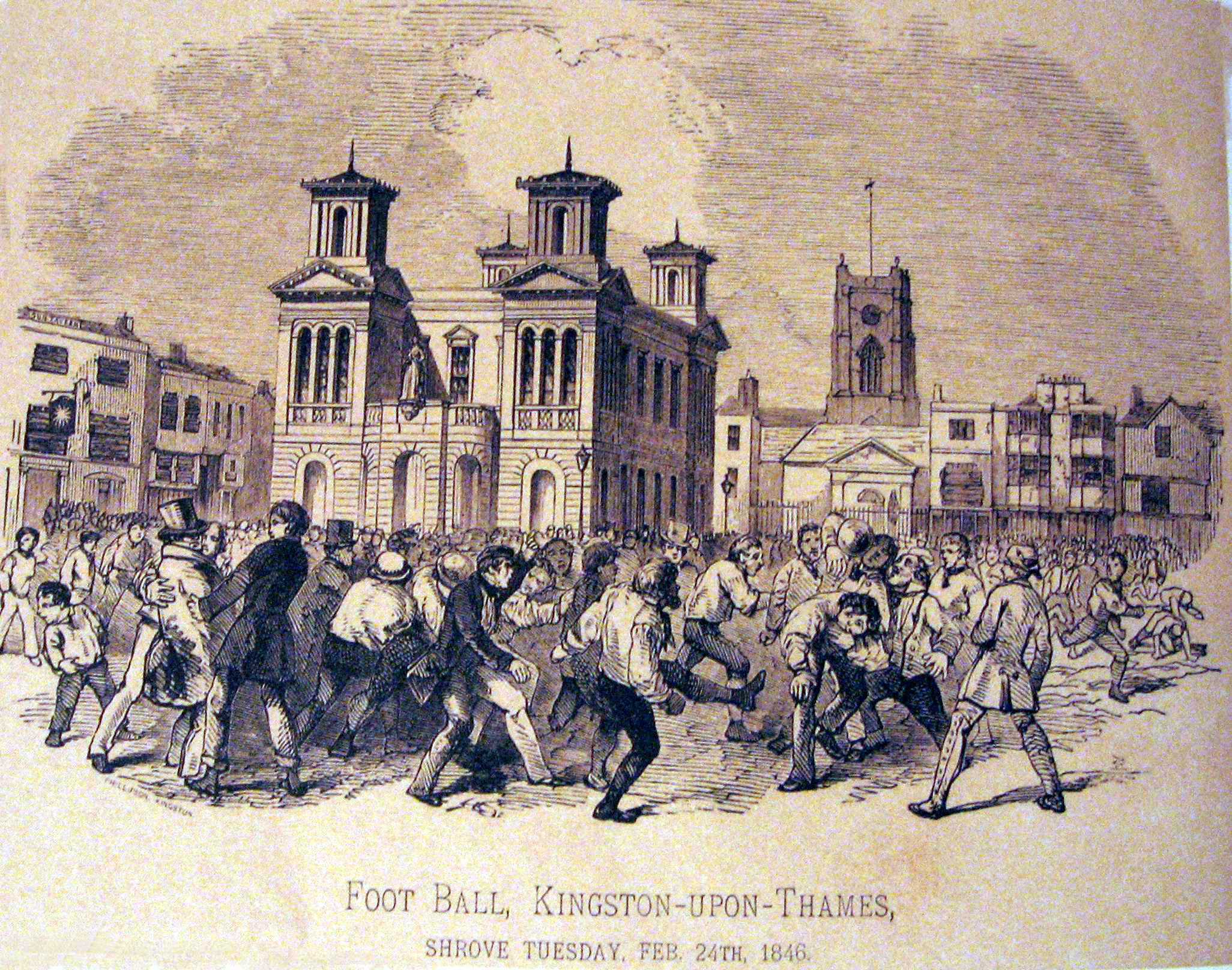
Shrovetide Football at Kingston in 1846

In 1965, Greater London was created and the old municipal borough was abolished. Its former area was merged with that of the Municipal Borough of Surbiton and the Municipal Borough of Malden and Coombe, to form the London Borough of Kingston upon Thames. At the request of Kingston upon Thames London Borough Council another royal charter was granted by Queen Elizabeth II entitling it to continue using the title "Royal Borough of Kingston upon Thames" for the new borough.

Kingston upon Thames
- History
  - Abolished: 1894
  - Succeeded by: Various (see text)
- Status: Civil parish before which Parish (meaning combined civil and ecclesiastic functions, and pre-1066-incepted, known today as ancient parish)

By 1839 it contained these chapelries, curacies or ecclesiastical parishes which eventually became civil parishes in their own right:

A map showing the wards of Kingston upon Thames Municipal Borough as they appeared in 1868.

Daughter parish	Creation of vestry	Notes as to its vestry/Borough	Notes as to creation	Local authority today
Claygate	1861	Board was Esher and the Dittons Urban District from 1895	From Thames Ditton	Elmbridge
East Molesey	1769	Local board from 1866		Elmbridge
Ham with Hatch*	1866	Local board from 1858		Richmond-upon-Thames
Hook*	1866	Local board from 1866	First church built 1838 made a Chapelry 1839.	Kingston upon Thames
Kew	1769	Absorbed by Borough of Richmond in 1892		Richmond-upon-Thames
Kingston upon Thames*	1484	Parish vestry powers mainly vested in identical-area Municipal Borough of Kingston-upon-Thames (abbrev. Kingston M.B.)		Kingston upon Thames
New Malden	1894	Local board from 1866		Kingston upon Thames
Petersham	1769	Absorbed by Borough of Richmond in 1892	Attached to Kew until 1891	Richmond-upon-Thames
Richmond (previously Sheen)	1849 remained with those marked * in 1769	Became Borough of Richmond in 1890		Richmond-upon-Thames
Surbiton	1894	Improvement commissioners from 1855		Kingston upon Thames
Thames Ditton	1769	School Board from 1881. Board: Esher and the Dittons Urban District from 1895		Elmbridge

It follows from the above list of chapelries and the hamlet of Hook, frequently listed in the medieval age that, well before the Conquest, the ancient parish was the Kingston hundred (of Surrey). There soon was a southern exception to this. By the 1086 snapshot of the Domesday Book, Long Ditton (which included exclave Tolworth east of Hook hamlet) had a fully-fledged church likely gaining its independence around that time as recorded throughout the high medieval age and onwards. Thus, in the grant of Kingston church and Long Ditton church to Merton Priory, soon after its foundation in 1117, Long Ditton does not appear as a chapelry of Kingston.

The residual Church of England ecclesiastical parish essentially divides sixfold:

- All Saints - whole riverside strip - 1 church
- St Peter, Norbiton - 2 churches
- St Luke - 1 church - between railway and the Kingston Academy/Wolsey park
- Kingston Hill, St Paul - 1 church
- Kingston upon Thames, St John the Evangelist - Penrhyn Road & The Grove southern area - 1 church
- Kingston Vale, St John the Baptist - 1 church

=== Urban development ===
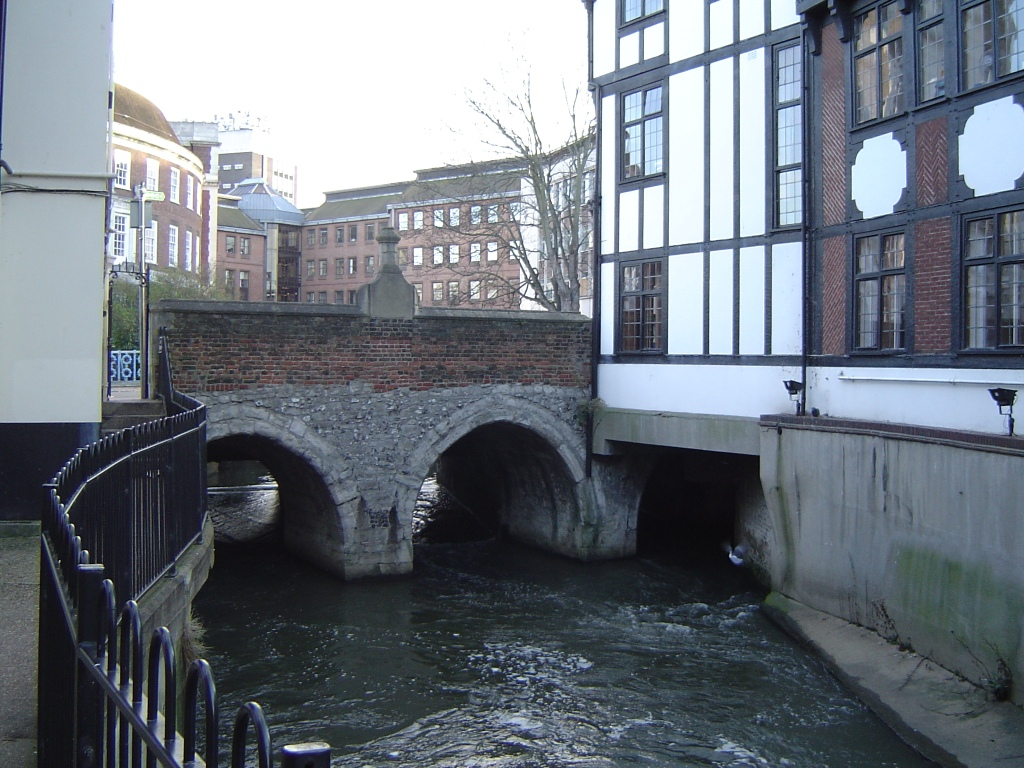
The Hogsmill flowing under Clattern Bridge in Kingston. The bridge is mentioned in 1293 as "Clateryngbrugge"

Kingston was built at the first crossing point of the Thames upstream from London Bridge and a bridge still exists at the same site. It was this 'great bridge' that gave it its early importance in the 13th century. Kingston was occupied by the Romans, and later it was either a royal residence or a royal demesne. There is a record of a council held there in 838, at which Egbert of Wessex, King of Wessex, and his son Ethelwulf of Wessex were present. In the Domesday Book it was held by William the Conqueror. Its domesday assets were: a church, five mills, four fisheries worth 10s, 27 ploughs, 40 acres (16 ha) of meadow, woodland worth six hogs. It rendered £31 10s (£31.50).

In 1730, the chapel containing the royal effigies collapsed, burying the sexton, who was digging a grave, the sexton's daughter and another person. The daughter survived this accident and was her father's successor as sexton. Kingston sent members to early Parliaments, until a petition by the inhabitants prayed to be relieved from the burden. Another chapel, the collegiate chapel of St Mary Magdalene, The Lovekyn Chapel, still exists. It was founded in 1309 by a former mayor of London, Edward Lovekyn. It is the only private chantry chapel to survive the Reformation.

With the coming of the railway in the 1830s, there was much building development to the south of the town. Much of this became the new town of Surbiton, but the Surbiton Park estate, built in the grounds of Surbiton Place in the 1850s, remained part of Kingston during the period of the Municipal Borough of Kingston-upon-Thames.

A permanent military presence was established in the borough with the completion of The Barracks in 1875.

=== Economic development ===
Kingston evolved as a market town from the Saxon period, with goods transported on the Thames and over land via the crossing point. Rights to hold markets were amongst the liberties granted by the royal charter of 1208 and the market formally established in 1242. A horse fair was held at a site on the downstream side of the river north of the bridge and a market extended from there to around the church by the 17th century and further south towards the course of the Hogsmill River. Goods traded included oats, wheat, rye, malt, apples and other fruit, flowers, wool, leather and cheese. Cattle, meat and fish were also traded. The regular Saturday market was supplemented by a Wednesday market in 1662. In addition to markets, regular fairs were held. Local industries included pottery, brick making, tanning, leather-working, fishing, milling, brewing and boat-building.

The presence of fabric and wood-working craft skills associated with boat-building was a factor in the choice of Kingston as the site chosen by Tommy Sopwith to expand production of early aircraft from Sopwith Aviation's origins at Brooklands. Well known aviation personalities Sydney Camm, Harry Hawker and Tommy Sopwith were responsible for much of Kingston's achievements in aviation. For much of the 20th century, Kingston was a major military aircraft manufacturing centre specialising in fighter aircraft – first with Sopwith Aviation, H G Hawker Engineering, later Hawker Aircraft, Hawker Siddeley and eventually British Aerospace. The renowned Sopwith Camel, Hawker Fury, Hurricane, Hunter and Harrier jump jet were all designed and built in the town and examples of all of these aircraft can be seen today at the nearby Brooklands Museum in Weybridge. British Aerospace finally closed its Lower Ham Road factory in 1992; part of the site was subsequently redeveloped for housing but the riverside part houses a community centre and sports complex.

During World War II Kingston-Upon-Thames did not escape damage from enemy bombs. During a raid on 9 September 1940 Luftwaffe aircraft damaged Kingsnympton Hall, formerly known as Hay Green House, which was subsequently demolished after the war.

=== Recent developments ===
Following the construction of the Kingston Relief Road (commonly known as the "Kingston one-way system") in 1989, major shopping streets in the town centre and the historic Market Place were pedestrianised. Two major commercial developments were also built in Kingston town centre - with John Lewis Kingston department store opening in 1990 and the Bentall Centre shopping centre opening in 1992. In the early 2000s, the Charter Quay development south of Kingston Bridge completed the riverside walk, as well as adding bars, restaurants and the Rose Theatre, which opened in 2008 with Sir Peter Hall as the director. In 2001, the old Kingston bus garage and bus station, closed the previous year, was demolished and the site redeveloped as the Rotunda complex, with an Odeon Cinema, restaurants and tenpin bowling.

== Governance ==
Kingston straddles two Parliamentary constituencies: the area north of the railway line is part of Richmond Park, which is represented by Sarah Olney of the Liberal Democrats, and the area south of the railway line (including the ancient town centre) is part of Kingston and Surbiton which is represented by Ed Davey of the Liberal Democrats.

Kingston is part of the Kingston Gate and Kingston Town wards for elections to Kingston upon Thames London Borough Council.

== Notable locations ==
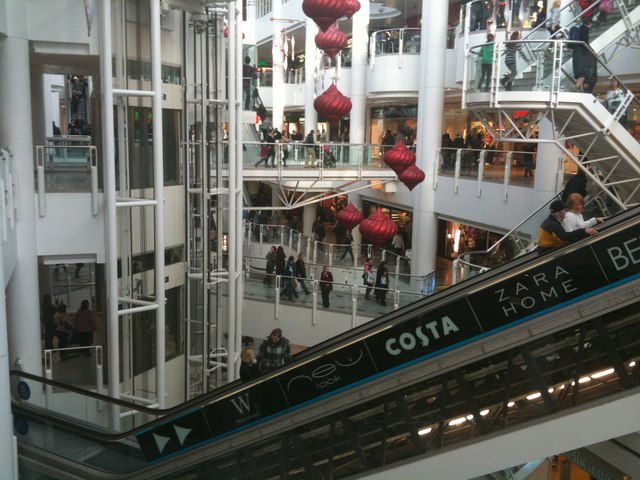
The Bentall Centre

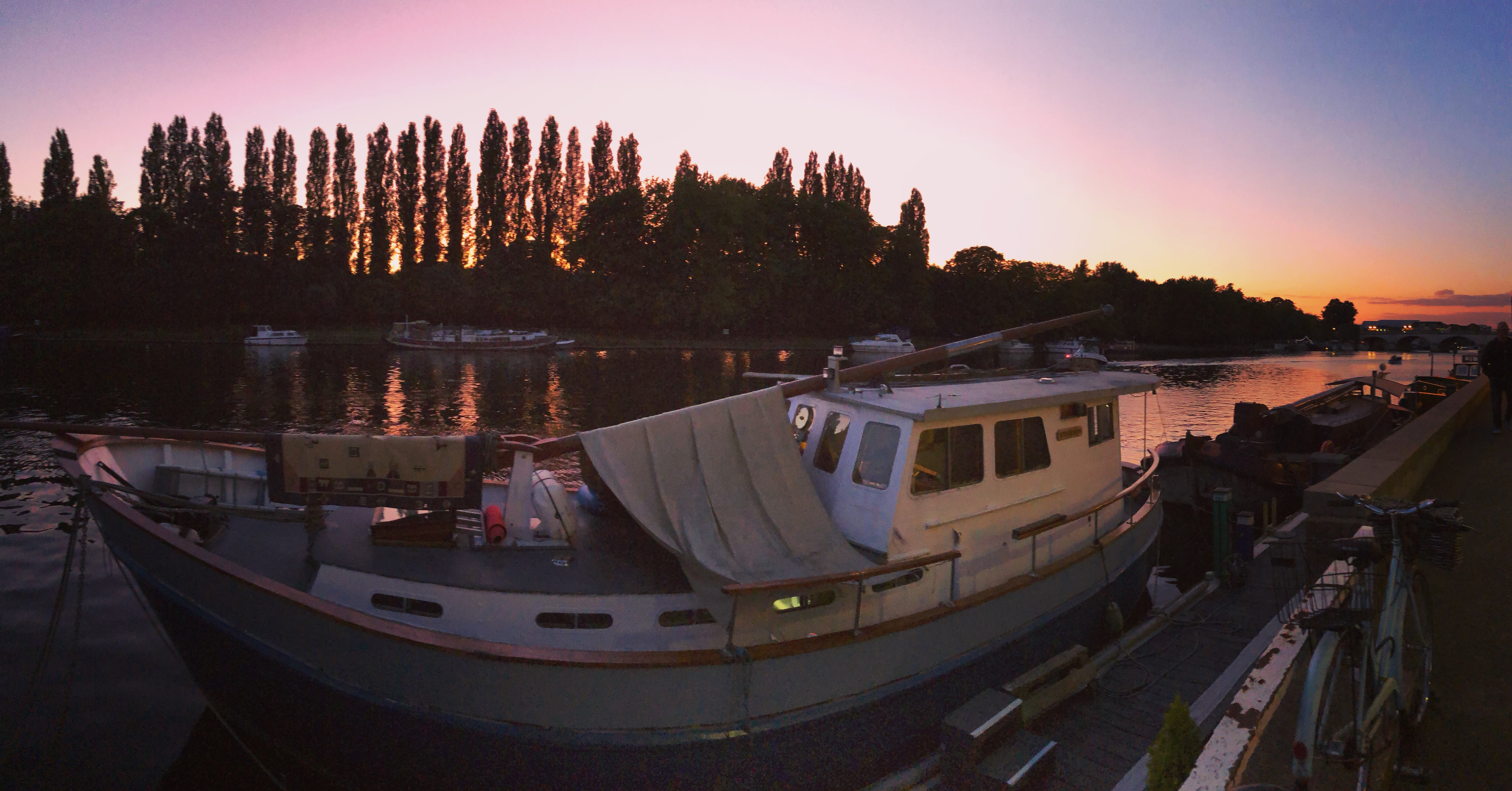
Sunset from Eagle Brewery Wharf

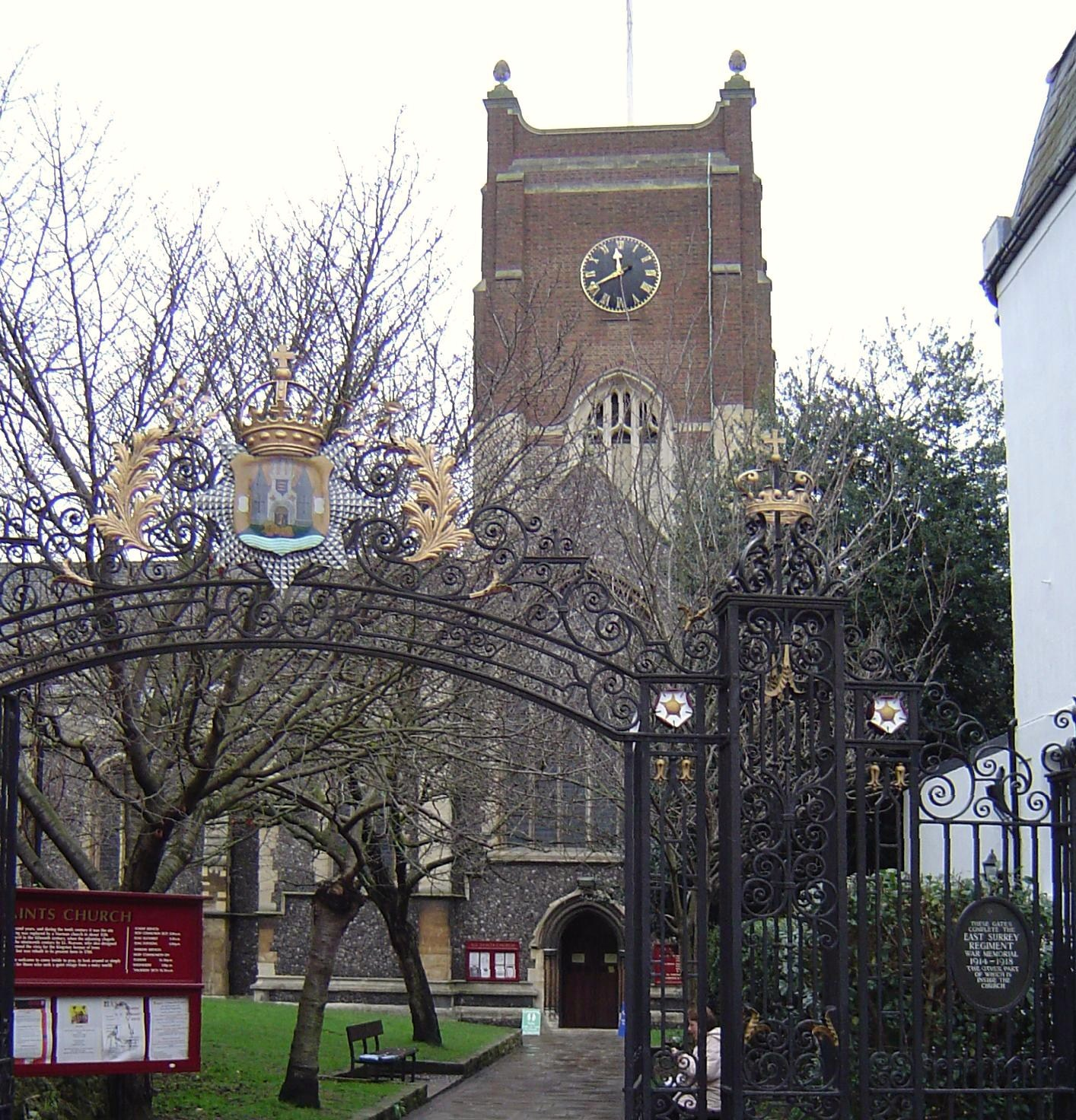
All Saint's Church, a Grade I listed building

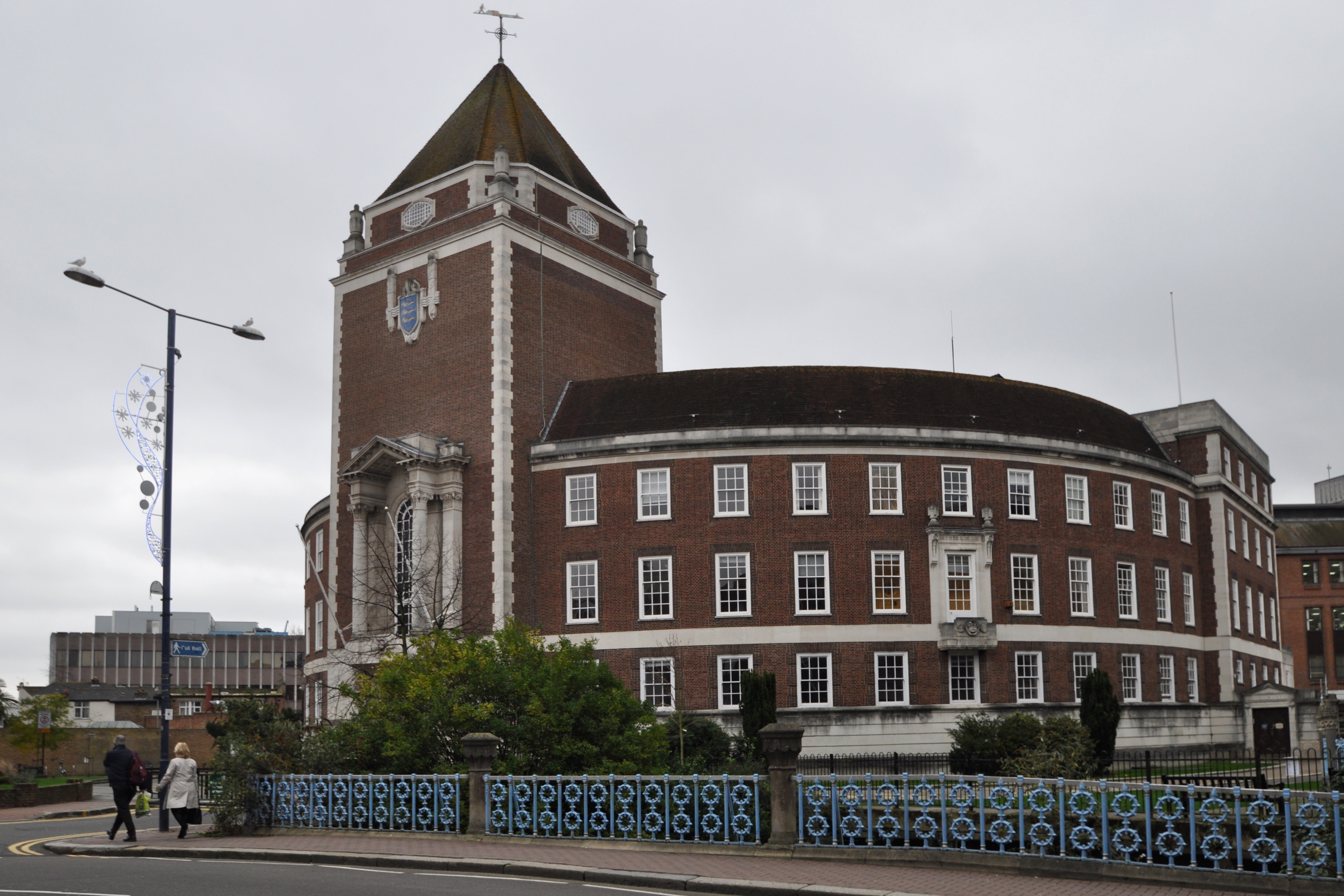
Kingston upon Thames Guildhall, completed in 1935

Central Kingston is a busy, largely pedestrian and predominantly retail centre, with a small number of commercial offices and civic buildings.

The shopping centre includes a shopping mall, "The Bentall Centre", containing the Bentalls department store and large branches of chain stores found in many British high streets. There is a large branch of the John Lewis department store group, with a Waitrose supermarket in the basement. A smaller 1960s shopping centre called Eden Walk exists nearby. The Rotunda, in a former Bentalls furniture depository building (a local landmark), includes a bowling alley, fitness centre, a 15-screen Odeon multiplex cinema and a few restaurants.

The ancient market is still held daily in the Market Place, including such produce as fish, jewellery, exotic foods, local foods and flowers.

Kingston's civic buildings include Kingston Museum, public library, modern Crown Court, smaller County Court and the Guildhall. The Guildhall is located by the part-culverted mouth of the Hogsmill River, and houses Kingston Council and magistrates' court. A short distance away is the County Hall Building which houses the main offices of Surrey County Council. From 1893 to 1965, before Kingston became one of the 32 London boroughs of Greater London, it was the county town of Surrey following the period of 1791–1893 when Newington had this role. Guildford has officially reclaimed this ancient, now ceremonial title as Kingston is no longer administered by Surrey.

Kingston's main open space is the River Thames, with its lively frontage of bars and restaurants. Downstream there is a walk through Canbury Gardens towards Teddington Lock. Upstream there is a promenade crossing the Hogsmill river and reaching almost to Surbiton. Eagle Brewery Wharf is a council-owned public space located on the riverside. Across Kingston Bridge is a tree lined river bank fronting the expanse of Hampton Court Park.

== Economy ==
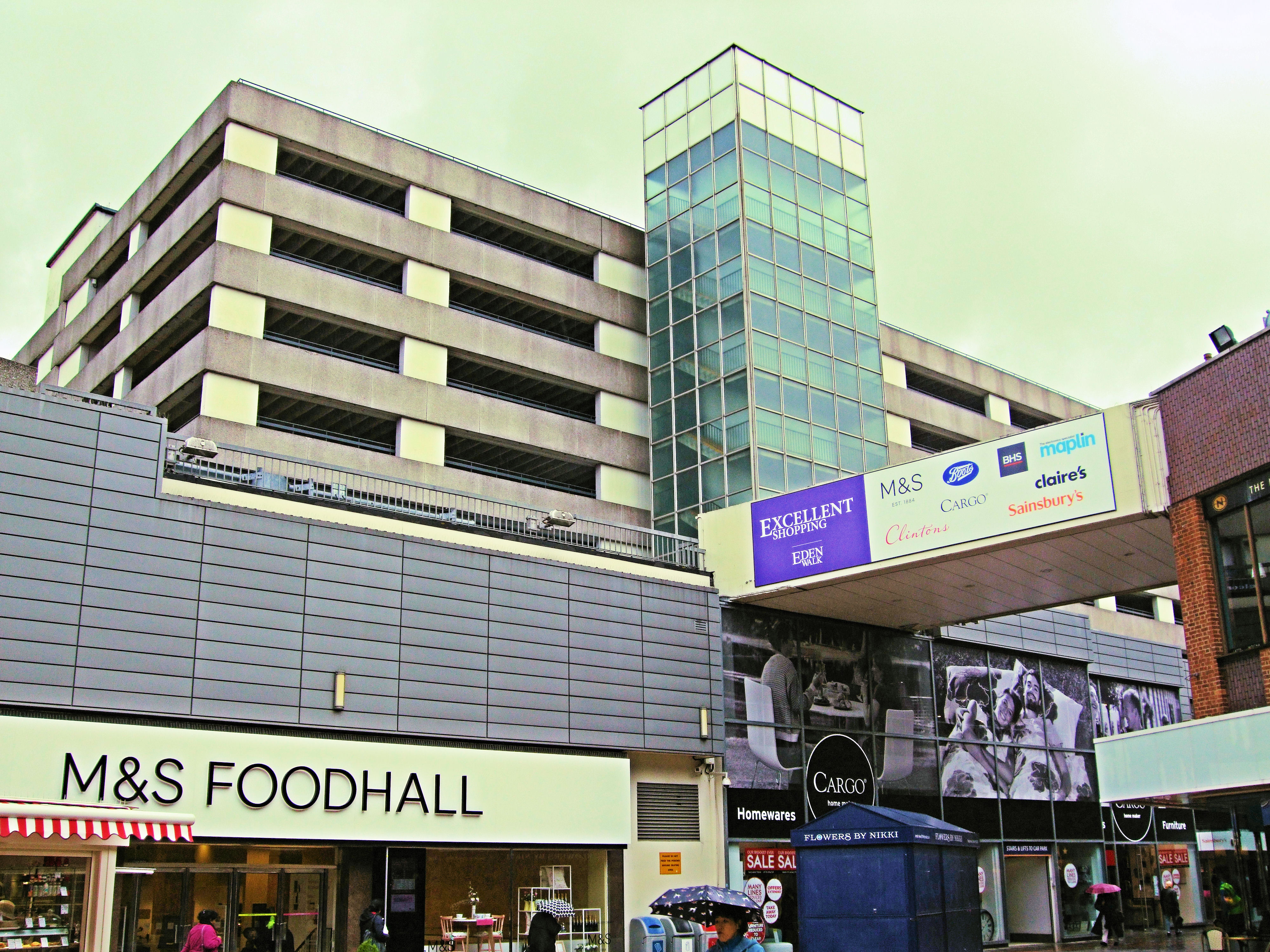
Eden Walk shopping centre

Kingston has many pubs and restaurants and several public houses in the centre have become restaurants or bars. The more traditional pubs tend to be in the northern part of the town (Canbury). The Druid's Head is notable as one of the first taverns to make syllabub, the famous dessert, in the 18th century. There are several Chinese, Indian, Thai and Italian restaurants.

The local newspapers are the weekly Surrey Comet, which celebrated its 150th year in 2004, and the Kingston Guardian.

In 2010 retail footprint research, Kingston ranked 25th in terms of retail expenditure in the UK at £810 million, equal to Covent Garden and just ahead of Southampton. This puts it as generating the fifth highest level of retail sales in Greater London, passing Croydon, with just four West End alternatives ahead. In 2005, Kingston was 24th with £864 million, and 3rd in London. In a 2015 study by CACI, Kingston was ranked 28th in the UK in the Hot 100 Retail Locations - and the second highest in Greater London after Croydon. In 2018, Kingston was ranked joint 5th in the UK by Knight Frank in the "High Street Investment Ranking", only bettered by Cambridge, Bath, Chichester and Reading.

In 2013 Kingston became the location for a local currency scheme, designed to boost and strengthen the local economy in Kingston, as part of the Transition towns initiative. The Kingston pound began as a digital currency, and from 2018 existed in paper format, with denominations of K£1;K£5;K£10;and K£20 designed by graphic design students from Kingston University. These were taken out of circulation in 2021, but have been sold to many collectors all over the world. The Kingston Pound is a 'tagged' sterling that can be exchanged either way on a 1 for 1 basis without any penalty.

As of 2011, Kingston upon Thames has the fourth highest retail turnover for comparison goods in Greater London, £432 million annually, only bettered by the West End, Shepherd's Bush and Stratford. As of 2012, Kingston has 276,438 square metres (2,975,550 sq ft) of total town centre floorspace, the 3rd highest in London.

== Culture ==
A notable dramatic arts venue is the Rose Theatre, opened on 16 January 2008 and seating about 900 people. The audience are arranged around the semi-circular stage. All Saints Church is host to classical choral and music concerts mostly on Saturdays and houses a Frobenius organ. There are a number of choral societies including the Kingston Orpheus Choir and the Kingston Choral Society, an amateur symphony orchestra the Kingston Philharmonia, and the Kingston and District Chamber Music Society. A number of annual festivals are organised by the Council and Kingston Arts Council including Kingston Readers' Festival, Think-in-Kingston and the Festival of the Voice. Kingston University runs the Stanley Picker Gallery and Kingston Museum has a changing gallery on the first floor. A regular singing group at the Rose Theatre caters to schools and families.

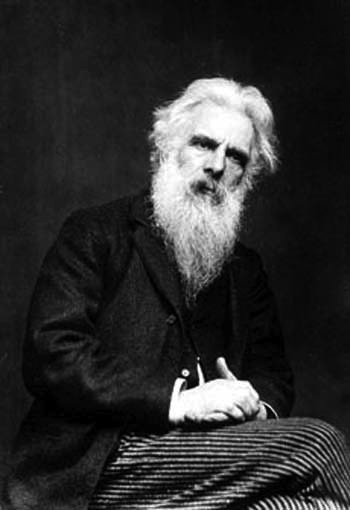
Eadweard Muybridge (photographer) was born in the town in 1830

John Galsworthy, the author, was born on Kingston Hill and Jacqueline Wilson grew up, and went to school in Kingston. Both are commemorated at Kingston University – Galsworthy in the newest building and Wilson in the main hall. Also commemorated at the university is photographer Eadweard Muybridge who was born at Kingston and changed the spelling of his first name in reference to the name of the Saxon king on the Coronation Stone. He was a pioneer in the photography of the moving image. R. C. Sherriff the playwright is also associated with Kingston, writing his first play to support Kingston Rowing Club. An earlier writer born in Kingston was John Cleland.

Kingston has been covered in literature, film and television. It is where the comic Victorian novel Three Men in a Boat by Jerome K. Jerome begins; cannons aimed against the Martians in H. G. Wells' The War of the Worlds are positioned on Kingston Hill; in The Rainbow by D. H. Lawrence the youngest Brangwen dreams of a job in Kingston upon Thames in a long, lyrical passage; Mr. Knightly in Emma by Jane Austen regularly visits Kingston, although the narrative never follows him there.

Fine art is also a prominent feature in the history of Kingston. Both John Hoyland and Jeremy Moon worked from permanent studios in Kingston and many artists and designers have studied at the university including Fiona Banner, John Bratby, David Nash and Jasper Morrison.

Early in his music career, the guitarist and singer-songwriter Eric Clapton spent time busking in Kingston upon Thames, having grown up and studied in the area. Rock band Cardiacs were formed in the town.

Recently, a scene from Mujhse Dosti Karoge, a Bollywood film starring Hrithik Roshan as the leading actor, was filmed by the toppled telephone boxes sculpture in Old London Road.

The 1974 Doctor Who story "Invasion of the Dinosaurs" used several locations in the town for filming. The 2008 series of Primeval, shown on ITV1 in January, featured almost an entire episode filmed inside the Bentall Centre and John Lewis department stores. Kingston featured in Primeval again in May 2009 with several scenes shot in and around the Market Place. Nipper, the famous "His Master's Voice" dog, is buried in the town under Lloyds Bank. His owners lived nearby in Fife Road.

Kingston Green Fair was held annually from 1987 to 2008 in Canbury Gardens, next to the river, on the Spring Bank Holiday. The word "Green" in the title refers to the ethos of the fair as promoting sustainable development. For instance no meat or other products derived from dead animals were allowed to be sold, and no electricity was permitted on the site unless generated by wind, sun, or bicycle power.

=== Public art ===
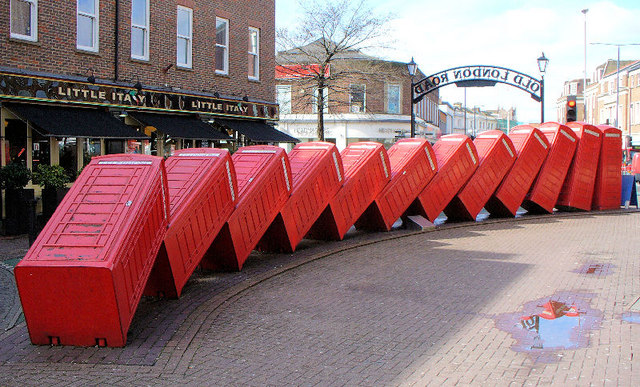
The sculpture "Out of Order"

One of the more unusual sights in Kingston is Out of Order by David Mach, a sculpture in the form of twelve disused red telephone boxes that have been tipped up to lean against one another in an arrangement resembling dominoes. The work was commissioned in 1988 as part of the landscaping for the new Relief Road, and was described by its creator as "anti-minimalist".

== Transport ==
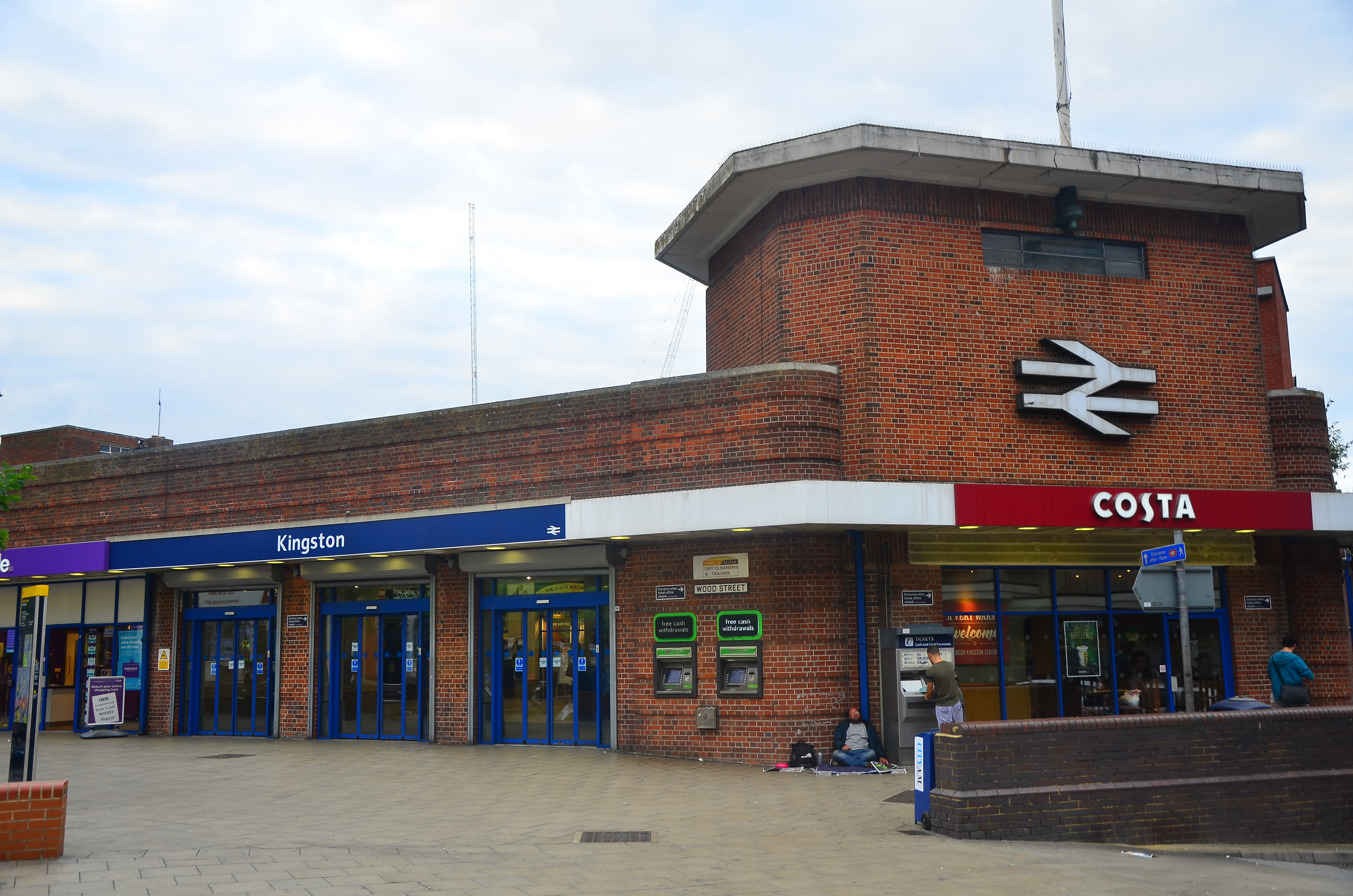
Kingston railway station

=== Rail ===
Kingston is principally served by Kingston railway station, which opened in 1863.

The station is in London fare zone 6 and is served by South Western Railway trains from London Waterloo. Trains to Waterloo link Kingston directly to destinations such as Wimbledon, Clapham Junction and Vauxhall. Eastbound trains travel to Shepperton via Teddington, Hampton and Sunbury. Eastbound trains also travel on the Kingston loop line towards Teddington, Strawberry Hill, Twickenham and Richmond, after which trains continue towards Waterloo. From Waterloo, trains to Kingston are advertised towards "Shepperton" and "Strawberry Hill".

A nearby station in Norbiton (in fare zone 5) is on the same lines.

Nearby Surbiton station – originally named Kingston when it opened in 1838 – is on the South West Main Line in London fare zone 6. Surbiton is also served by South Western Railway trains from Waterloo. Southbound services link Surbiton to destinations in Surrey and Hampshire, such as Hampton Court, Guildford, Woking and Basingstoke. The station building at Surbiton was built in 1937, designed in an Art Deco style by James Robb Scott. It has been Grade II listed since 1983.

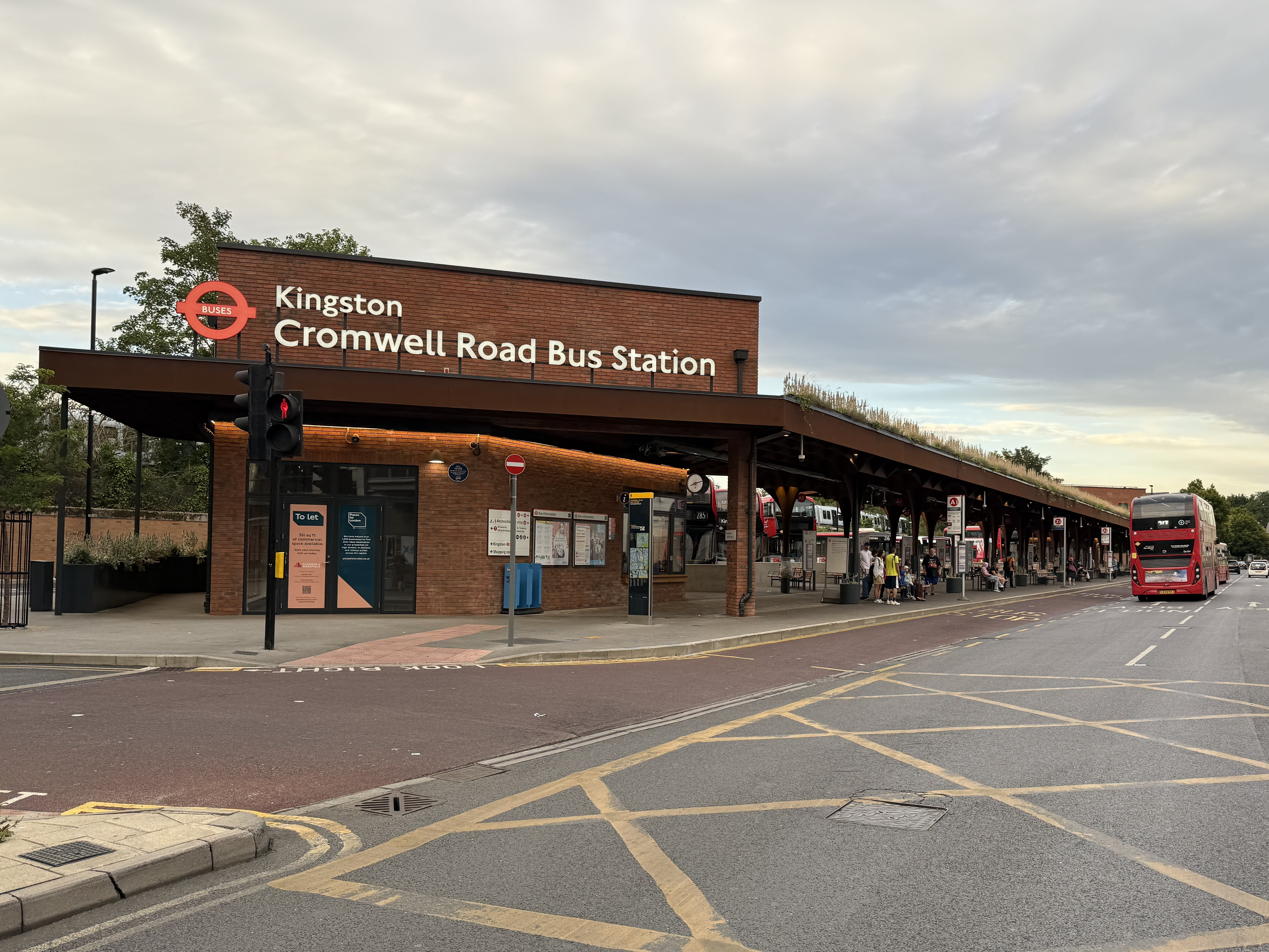
Cromwell Road bus station

=== Bus ===
Kingston is served by two bus stations, Cromwell Road and Fairfield, and a large number of bus stops, with destinations across Greater London and Surrey including links directly to Heathrow Airport.

=== Road ===
The Kingston Bypass passes to the south and east of Kingston. The bypass carries the A3, which links the area to Merton, Wandsworth, Clapham and the City of London to the north. To the south, the A3 runs to Portsmouth via Guildford and Petersfield.

A portion of the bypass carries the A309 to Thames Ditton, Hampton Court and the A308.

There are several radial routes including:

- A238 towards Raynes Park, Wimbledon, Colliers Wood and Tooting
- A240 towards Surbiton, Tolworth, Ewell, Epsom, Banstead and Reigate
- A2043 towards New Malden, Worcester Park, Cheam and Sutton
- A307 northbound towards Petersfield, Richmond and the M4, or southbound towards Thames Ditton, Esher and Cobham
- A308 eastbound towards the A3, Putney and Wandsworth and westbound towards Hampton Court, Sunbury-on-Thames (for M3) and Staines-upon-Thames
- A310 via A308 northbound towards Teddington, Twickenham and Hounslow

==== Kingston Relief Road ====
In the 1960s, planners proposed a partially elevated ring road encircling the town centre, to alleviate congestion on major shopping streets and traffic heading towards Kingston Bridge. After objections from local residents, an interim one-way system was implemented in July 1963. Following this, the Kingston Relief Road was constructed in Kingston town centre in the late 1980s. Commonly known as the "Kingston one-way system", the road encircles the town centre, allowing for major shopping streets such as Clarence Street to be pedestrianised. On the western side of the town centre, the road passes underneath John Lewis Kingston before crossing the River Thames via Kingston Bridge. As part of the project, two bus stations were constructed, cycle lanes installed and several artworks commissioned including Out of Order by David Mach and River Celebration by Carole Hodgson.

=== River ===
Kingston Town End and Kingston Turks piers are situated in Kingston. Turk Launches operates a Summer-only river tour between Hampton Court and Richmond St Helena.

=== Cycling ===
There is a network of cycle lanes throughout Kingston linking the area to destinations throughout south-west London and England.

Key routes include:

- National Cycle Route 4 - A route from Greenwich in south-east London to St Davids in west Wales. NCR4 follows the route of the River Thames near Kingston, crossing from the south side of the river to the north over Kingston Bridge. Northbound, the route runs towards Central London and Greenwich via Ham, Richmond Park and Barnes. Westbound, NCR4 runs towards Reading via Walton, Egham and Eton. The route is part of EuroVelo 2, a route from Moscow to Galway.
- Cycleway 28 - A two-way, segregated cycle track between Kingston and Seething Wells along Portsmouth Road.
- Cycleway 29 - A cycle route, much of which is two-way and segregated from other road traffic between Kingston and Fishponds Park. Much of the route follows Penrhyn Road and Ewell Road.
- Cycleway 30 - A segregated cycle track between C29 at Kingston to Putney Vale, following the route of A308 London Road.

== Education ==
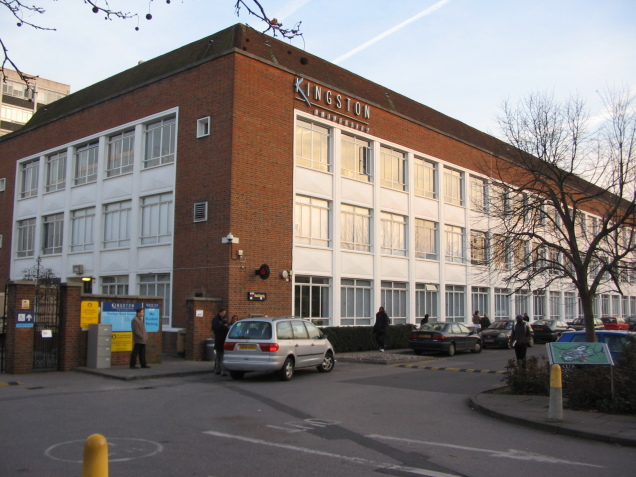
Kingston University main building, Penrhyn Road campus

Tiffin School

Kingston is the location of Kingston University and Kingston College. Primary schools in the town include Latchmere School, Fernhill School, St Luke's School, King Athelstan School and St Agatha's Catholic Primary School. Secondary schools in the town include The Kingston Academy, Tiffin School, Tiffin Girls' School and Kingston Grammar School, all of which have large catchment areas across Greater London and Surrey.

The growth and development of Kingston Polytechnic, and its transformation into Kingston University in 1992, has made Kingston a university town.

== Religious sites ==
The 12th-century All Saints Church serves the Church of England parish of Kingston which lies ecclesiastically in the Diocese of Southwark, although there has been a church in Kingston since at least 838. The suffragan or Area Bishop of Kingston is the Rt Rev Dr Martin Gainsborough. Other Anglican churches in Kingston, of more recent date, are St John the Evangelist and St Luke.

Kingston lies in the Roman Catholic Archdiocese of Southwark, and there is a Roman Catholic Church dedicated to Saint Agatha.

Kingston is also the home of the Kingston Surbiton & District Synagogue. It also has a Quaker meeting house, a Mosque and a Sikh Gurdwara.

Lady Booth Road, formerly Fairfield Road, is named to commemorate the former location of the Salvation Army citadel.

== Sport ==
Kingston is the home of four association football clubs, Chelsea F.C. Women who play at the Kingsmeadow Stadium, Corinthian-Casuals and Kingstonian who play in Tolworth, and Chessington & Hook United who play in Chessington. Chelsea F.C. Women play in the FA Women's Super League, whereas Kingstonian, Corinthian-Casuals and Chessington & Hook United are non-league clubs.

Kingston Athletic Club and Polytechnic Harriers are based at the neighbouring Kingsmeadow athletics stadium. This stadium has a 400m track which is floodlit, a gym and 5-a-side football facilities. Kingston Rugby Club is based on the outskirts of the town, and Kingston Rowing Club (founded in 1858) is based in Canbury Gardens on the River Thames. The Club holds two large timed race events (HEADs) in the Spring and Autumn. Kingston Regatta takes place on the river just above the bridge over a weekend in early July.

The town has a large leisure centre next to Fairfield named the Kingfisher Centre, which contains an indoor swimming pool and gymnasium. Sport in Kingston is promoted and encouraged by Sport Kingston, an organisation funded by the Royal Borough of Kingston.

Kingston Wildcats School of Basketball is a community basketball development club that practices and plays its home fixtures at Chessington School, competing in the Surrey League and Basketball England National League.

Old Kingstonaian Hockey Club, Old Cranleighan Hockey Club, Surbiton Hockey Club and Teddington Hockey Club are local field hockey clubs that compete in the Women's England Hockey League, the Men's England Hockey League and the London Hockey League.

=== London 2012 Summer Olympics ===
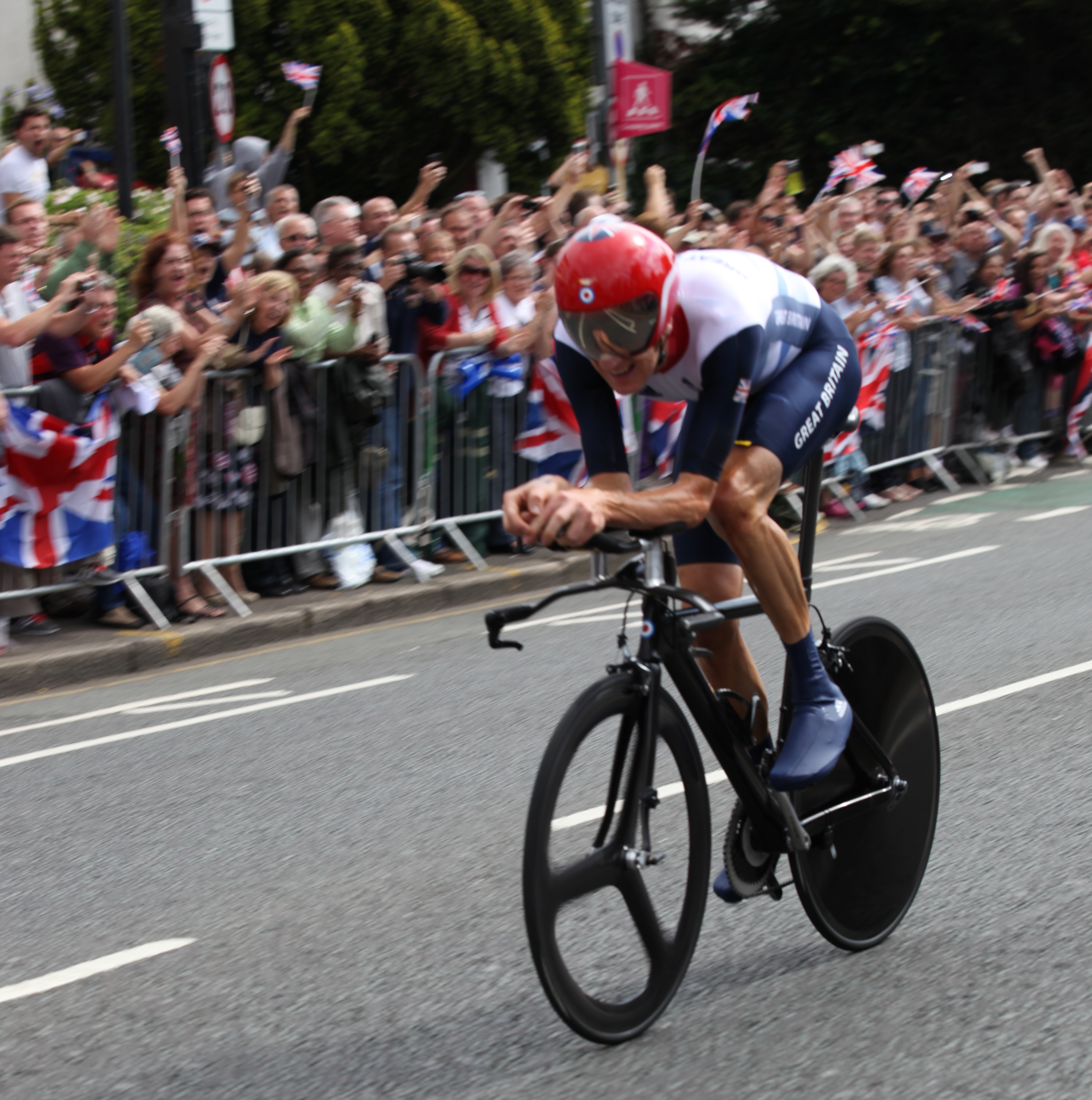
Bradley Wiggins riding towards central Kingston on 1 August 2012.

Prior to the opening of the games, Kingston hosted the 2012 Summer Olympics torch relay on two occasions with the flame travelling through the borough on 24 July 2012 and aboard the Gloriana in a cauldron on 27 July 2012 en route to the Olympic Stadium for the opening ceremony. The borough was the setting for four cycling events during the Olympics, the men's road race, women's road race, men's road time trial and women's road time trial.

Following the games, the London–Surrey Classic professional road bicycle race ran through the town from 2013 to 2018, using a similar course to the Olympic road race. Following the COVID-19 pandemic, the race will not return to Kingston, with the RideLondon festival using the roads of Essex instead.

== Geography ==
Kingston is 3 miles (5 km) south-east of Twickenham, 5 miles (8 km) north-east of Walton-on-Thames, and 6 miles (10 km) north-west of Sutton.

== Town twinning ==
Kingston upon Thames has been twinned with Oldenburg in Germany since 2010. It also has been historically twinned with Delft in the Netherlands. Since 2016, Kingston upon Thames has been twinned with Jaffna in Sri Lanka.

== Bibliography ==
- Dickens, Charles Jr (1994) [1887, 1879]. Dickens's Dictionary of the Thames, 1887 (facsimile ed.). Moretonhampstead: Old House Books. ISBN 978-1-8735-9012-6. – A guide to the Thames written by the novelist's son
- Lysons, Daniel (1792). "Kingston upon Thames". Environs of London. Vol. I: County of Surrey. London: Thomas Cadell.
- Malden, H. E., ed. (1967) [1905]. "Colleges: Collegiate chapel of St Mary Magdalen, Kingston". A History of the County of Surrey. Victoria County History. Vol. II. London: Institute of Historical Research. pp. 125–127. Archived from the original on 17 July 2012.
- Malden, H. E., ed. (1911). A History of the County of Surrey. Victoria County History. Vol. III. Westminster: Archibald Constable & Co. pp. 487–516. Archived from the original on 28 January 2021.
- Thorne, James (1876). "Kingston-upon-Thames". Handbook to the Environs of London. London: John Murray. hdl:2027/mdp.39015063815669.
- Walford, Edward (1883). "Kingston-on-Thames". Greater London. London: Cassell & Co. OCLC 3009761.
