= Eden Walk =

Shopping centre in London, England

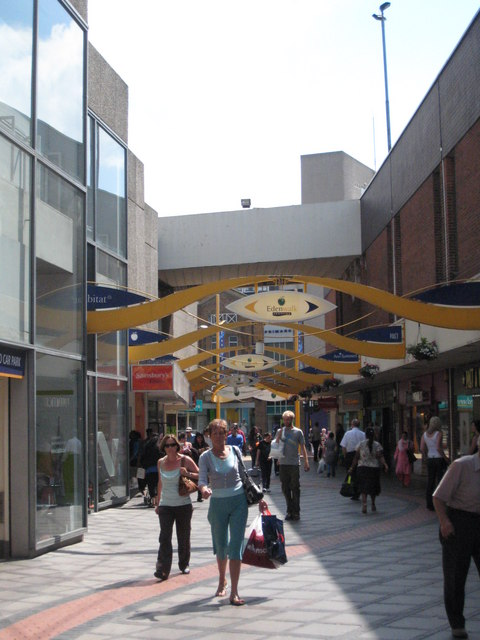
- Location: Kingston upon Thames, England
- Coordinates: 51.412°N 0.3046°W
- Opened: 1968
- Owner: Universities Superannuation Scheme and British Land (50% each)
- Num. of stores: 29
- Floor area: 276,000 sq ft (25,600 m^{2})
- Parking: 700 spaces
- Website: www.edenwalkshopping.co.uk

Eden Walk is an open precinct shopping centre in Kingston upon Thames, Greater London, England. It opened in 1968, predating The Bentall Centre by two decades.

== History ==
The construction of Eden Walk was the basis for today's major retail centre of Kingston upon Thames, which has since turned into a major shopping destination for south-west London and parts of Surrey. Construction started in 1964 and was completed by 1968, along with a multi-storey car park above; it was then extended from 1977 to 1979. The centre was refurbished in 2010.

In 2017, the owners Universities Superannuation Scheme (USS) and British Land were green-lit to regenerate the area and its vicinity for £400 million. The plans include a boutique cinema and 385 apartments.

== Stores ==
Eden Walk has over 20 retailers. As of 2024 it is anchored by Marks & Spencer which connects through and also fronts onto Clarence Street, and Primark which sits on Eden Street to the east of the shopping centre. Other stores include Boots, Heal's and Sainsbury's.

== Food and Drink ==
Additionally, Eden Walk has some food and drink outlets, including a Paul (bakery) and a Caffè Nero.
