= Jim Thompson (bishop) =

British Anglican bishop (1936–2003)

James Thompson
- Bishop of Bath and Wells
- Diocese: Diocese of Bath and Wells
- In office: 1991–2001
- Predecessor: George Carey
- Successor: Peter Price
- Other posts: Honorary assistant bishop in the Diocese of Exeter (2001–2003); Bishop of Stepney (1978–1991)

Orders
- Ordination: 1966 (deacon); 1967 (priest)
- Consecration: c. 1978

Personal details
- Born: 11 August 1936 Birmingham, Warwickshire, England, United Kingdom
- Died: 19 September 2003 (aged 67) Devon, England, United Kingdom
- Denomination: Anglican
- Spouse: Sally
- Children: Ben and Anna
- Profession: Broadcaster; Chartered Accountant
- Education: Dean Close School, Cheltenham; Emmanuel College, Cambridge

Member of the House of Lords
- Lord Spiritual
- Bishop of Bath and Wells; 24 June 1997 – 31 December 2001

James Lawton Thompson (11 August 1936 – 19 September 2003) was a British Anglican bishop. He was firstly the suffragan Bishop of Stepney (one of five Episcopal Areas of the Diocese of London in the Church of England since the 1979 creation of the London area scheme) from 1978 to 1991 and later the diocesan Bishop of Bath and Wells in succession to George Carey who had become Archbishop of Canterbury. He retired in 2001.

Thompson was probably best known to many as a regular contributor to the "Thought for the Day" segment on BBC Radio 4's Today programme. Following his death in 2003, obituaries in the national press praised his deep humanity and lively sense of humour. One obituary referred to his gift of "conveying the warmth of his physical presence in his voice and in his words", adding that "his reflection on the events of 11 September 2001 was nominated for a Sony Broadcast Award, uniquely for religious broadcasting." He used his seat in the House of Lords to express his concerns for equality and education. The Telegraph described him as "the Church of England's best known commentator on social and political matters as well as a prominent advocate of religious and racial tolerance." Thompson wrote that "a bishop who doesn't give offence to anyone is probably not a good bishop." Thompson was also an important figure in interfaith relations in Britain, chairing the British Council of Churches advisory committee and co-chairing the Interfaith Network for the United Kingdom. He believed that when Christians helped to create opportunities for all faiths to participate in public and in institutional life (such as in educational and health care chaplaincy) they were being good neighbours in a multi-faith world.

== Career ==
Thompson was born in Birmingham and was a theology graduate with a Master of Arts degree from Emmanuel College, Cambridge. He qualified as a Chartered Accountant in 1959 and National service saw him commissioned into the 3rd Royal Tank Regiment (1959–1961) with the rank of Second Lieutenant, stationed mainly in Germany, before returning to Emmanuel College, Cambridge and then going to Cuddesdon Theological College, Oxford. He was ordained deacon in 1966 and priest in 1967. He was a curate in East Ham from 1966 to 1968 and became chaplain to Cuddesdon Theological College under Robert Runcie (then Principal) in 1968. From 1971 he was Ecumenical Team Rector of Thamesmead. He became Bishop of Stepney in 1978, succeeding Trevor Huddleston and the first area bishop in 1979. In 1991, he was translated to the historic diocesan see of Bath and Wells. He retired in 2001 although continued to minister as an honorary assistant bishop in the Diocese of Exeter.

== Ideological clashes ==
Before beginning his ministry as a bishop in 1978, Thompson, for a public figure, attracted perhaps more than the usual share of criticism – particularly from supporters of the Thatcher Government in the 1980s. This was largely due to his championing of the causes of those he viewed as disadvantaged; these particularly included the urban poor of East London, where Thompson served as bishop.

Some of his public comments were perceived by some as unduly political. This was undoubtedly behind Prime Minister Margaret Thatcher's decision to overrule the Church of England's appointment procedure by not appointing him Bishop of Birmingham (the second name on the list submitted to her was appointed).

In later life, however, Thompson could not have been said to be party political, instead aiming – perhaps idealistically – to apply the values of the Kingdom of God to everyday life and issues, which lead him into the political arena, intentionally or not. Thompson's clergy – whether or not they agreed with him on particular issues – tended to regard him as a good man, a warm-hearted pastor and an engaging personality.

In 1995, Thompson chaired the Church of England's Board for Social Responsibility's sub-committee, who produced the report Something to Celebrate. The report stirred controversy by suggesting that partners who were faithful in relationships outside marriage should not be thought as of living in sin. From some of his colleagues, says Ruth McCurry, "he met with little support for his passionate concerns – for gay and women's rights, for Bangladeshis, for all who were marginalised".

== British Council of Churches and interfaith relations ==
In 1983, Thompson was chosen to succeed David Brown (Bishop of Guildford) as moderator of the Committee for Relations with People of Other Faiths (CROPOF) working closely with Kenneth Cracknell, executive secretary until 1987 and also with his successor, Clinton Bennett. As moderator Thompson also sat on the council's general committee. On taking up his appointment as Bishop of Bath and Wells in 1989 he stepped down from the committee and was succeeded as moderator by David Silk, Archdeacon of Leicester (later Bishop of Ballarat, Victoria, Australia). Thompson was also co-chair of the Inter-Faith Network for the United Kingdom from its formation in 1987 until 1992. He enjoyed an excellent relationship with leading members of the various faith communities, not least of all with his co-chair, Holocaust survivor and fellow Thought for the Day presenter, Rabbi Hugo Gryn and with Zaki Badawi, Chair of the Imam and Mosques Council. Interfaith relations were becoming increasingly important in Britain's multi religious and multi cultural society. The Salman Rushdie affair, the 1988 Education Act's clauses on school worship and religious education and the first Gulf War were among the many issues on the CROPOF agenda under Thompson's leadership.

== Other posts and honours ==
Thompson chaired the Children's Society from 1997 to 2002. From 1995, he was Joint President of the English Churches Housing Trust. He was awarded a Doctor of Letters (DLitt) degree from the East London Polytechnic (now the University of East London in 1989 and from the University of Bath (awarded 1 December 1998). In 1995 Exeter University gave him an honorary Doctor of Divinity (DD) and Queen Mary, University of London made him an honorary fellow in 1986. In 1987, he was presented with the Sigmund Sternberg Award for Christian-Jewish Relations. Emmanuel College, Cambridge elected him to an honorary fellowship in 1992.

== Writings ==
- Thompson, Jim (1989) Docklands Redevelopment, London: Docklands Forum ISBN 1-872453-01-5
- Thompson, Jim (1986) Half Way: reflections in middle life, London: Collins ISBN 0-00-626967-2
- Thompson, Jim (1990) The Lord's Song, London: Fount ISBN 0-00-627106-5
- Thompson, Jim (1991) Stepney Calling, London: Mowbray ISBN 0-264-67208-9
- Thompson, Jim (1997) Why God? London: Mowbray ISBN 0-264-67388-3
- Thompson, Jim (2003) Good Morning!: a decade of thoughts for the day, London: SPCK ISBN 0-281-05498-3
