= Freddy Hawkes =

British bishop

- Bishop of Kingston
- Diocese: Diocese of Southwark
- In office: 1927 – 1952 (ret.)
- Predecessor: Percy Herbert
- Successor: William Gilpin
- Other post: Archdeacon of Southwark and Rector of Lambeth (1919–1927)

Orders
- Ordination: 1903
- Consecration: 1927

Personal details
- Born: 22 November 1878
- Died: 26 January 1966 (aged 87)
- Denomination: Anglican
- Education: Magdalen College, Oxford

Frederick Ochterloney Taylor Hawkes (22 November 1878 – 26 January 1966) was the fourth Bishop of Kingston.

Hawkes was educated at Magdalen College, Oxford and was ordained in 1903.

He became a curate at St Mary's Church, Portsea, and then Vicar of Aldershot. In the First World War he was commissioned as a Temporary Chaplain to the Forces in May 1918, and was posted to France attached to the Coldstream Guards. By May 1919, he had been promoted to Senior Chaplain with the Guards Division. A report on him referred to his "excellent work as a chaplain". In 1919, he was appointed Rector of Lambeth and Archdeacon of Southwark before his ordination to the episcopate, a post he held until retirement to Oxted in 1952. He died in 1966.

An obituary contrasted his Victorian garb of frock coat, gaiters and silk hat with his commitment to the back-streets of the diocese which he knew intimately and whose inhabitants he supported conscientiously. Some of his correspondence is housed within The National Archives.

Church of England titles
Preceded by Percy Herbert	Bishop of Kingston; 1927–1952	Succeeded by William Gilpin
