= Cecil Hook =

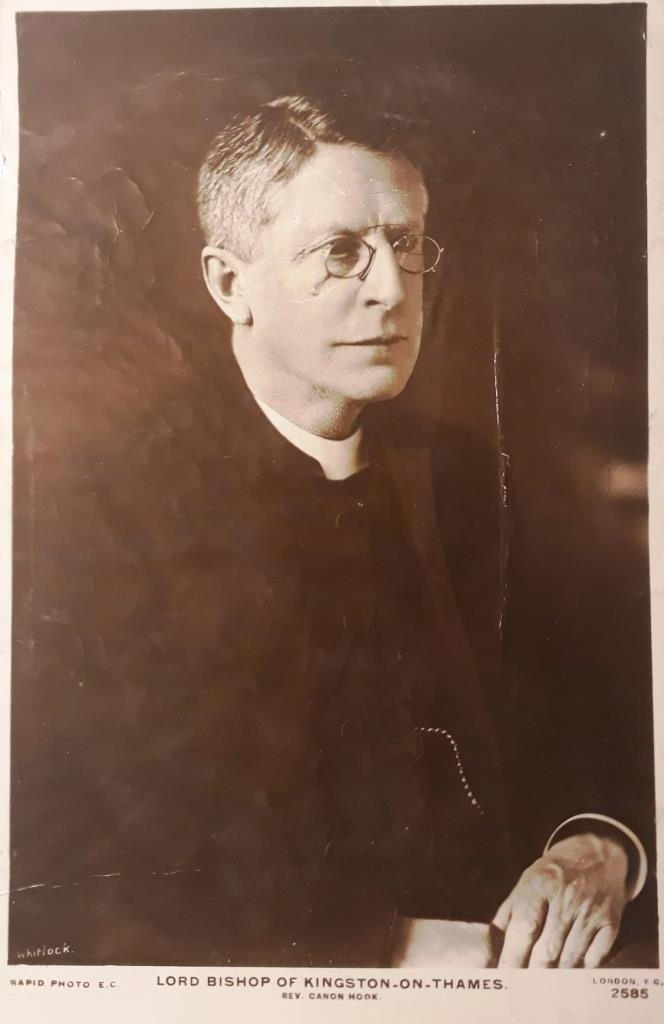
Canon Cecil Hook, Lord Bishop of Kingston-on-Thames (1905-1915)

Cecil Hook (1 December 1844 – 4 February 1938) was, from 1905 to 1915, the first Bishop of Kingston in the Church of England.

Hook was born on 1 December 1844 into a clerical family. He was educated at Radley School and Christ Church, Oxford. He was ordained in 1868 was a curate at St John's Redland, Bristol. He was then appointed Rector of All Saints' Chichester. He was appointed Rural Dean of Oswestry in 1891 and then Leamington in 1896. He was appointed suffragan in 1904 to assist the Bishop of Southwark.

Church of England titles
Preceded by Inaugural appointment	Bishop of Kingston; 1905–1915	Succeeded by Samuel Mumford Taylor
