= Charles Gilpin =

Charles Gilpin may refer to:

- Charles Gilpin (politician) (1815–1874), British politician, MP for Northampton
- Charles Gilpin (mayor), mayor of Philadelphia 1850–1854
- Charles Sidney Gilpin (1878–1930), American actor

== See also ==
- Gilpin (disambiguation)
