= Martin Wharton =

British Anglican bishop (born 1944)

The Right Reverend Martin Wharton CBE
- Bishop of Newcastle
- Church: Church of England
- Diocese: Diocese of Newcastle
- In office: 1997–30 November 2014 (retired)
- Predecessor: Andrew Graham
- Successor: Christine Hardman
- Other post: Area Bishop of Kingston (1992–1997)

Orders
- Ordination: 1972
- Consecration: 3 November 1992

Personal details
- Born: 6 August 1944 (age 82) Ulverston, Lancashire
- Denomination: Anglican
- Parents: John Wharton & Marjorie Skinner
- Spouse: Marlene Duckett (1970—present)
- Children: One daughter, two sons
- Education: Van Mildert College, Durham

Member of the House of Lords
- Lord Spiritual
- Bishop of Newcastle; 5 February 2003 – 30 November 2014

John Martin Wharton, CBE (born 6 August 1944) is a British Anglican bishop, a retired Bishop of Newcastle.

== Early life and education ==
Wharton was born in Ulverston, Lancashire, the son of John Wharton and Marjorie Skinner. He was educated at Ulverston Grammar School and Van Mildert College, Durham where he graduated with a Bachelor of Arts (BA) degree in economics, politics and sociology in 1969. He was further educated at Linacre College, Oxford, where he received a Bachelor of Theology (BTh) and an Oxford Master of Arts (MA Oxon) in 1971, as well as at Ripon Hall, Oxford.

== Career ==
=== Ordained ministry ===
Wharton was curate of St Peter's Church, Spring Hill, Birmingham, from 1972 to 1975 and of St John the Baptist, Croydon (now Croydon Minster), from 1975 to 1977. Between 1977 and 1983 he was Director of Pastoral Studies at Ripon College Cuddesdon, Oxford. He was additionally a curate of the Church of All Saints, Cuddesdon from 1979 to 1983. Between 1983 and 1992 he was the Director of Ministry and Training in the Diocese of Bradford and a residentiary canon of Bradford Cathedral. In 1992, Wharton was consecrated a bishop by George Carey, Archbishop of Canterbury, at Southwark Cathedral on 3 November 1992, to become area Bishop of Kingston-upon-Thames; he held that post until 1997, when he was appointed the 11th Bishop of Newcastle.

=== Other work ===
Wharton is a trustee of St Hilda's Trust, of the Northumbria Historic Churches Trust and The Hild Bede Trust. He is also trustee of the Shepherds Law Hermitage Trust and the Newcastle Diocesan Society. He served for ten years as Chair of Governors of St Chad's College, Durham. The college made him an honorary fellow in 2010.

== Views ==
On 11 February 2017, Wharton was one of fourteen retired bishops to sign an open letter to the then-serving bishops of the Church of England. In an unprecedented move, they expressed their opposition to the House of Bishops' report to General Synod on sexuality, which recommended no change to the Church's canons or practises around sexuality. By 13 February, a serving bishop (Alan Wilson, Bishop of Buckingham) and nine further retired bishops had added their signatures; on 15 February, the report was rejected by synod.

== Personal life ==
Since 1970, he has been married to Marlene Olive Duckett. They have one daughter and two sons.

Wharton was appointed Commander of the Order of the British Empire (CBE) in the 2011 New Year Honours for services to the Church of England and to the community in the North East.

== Styles ==
- The Reverend Martin Wharton (1972–1983)
- The Reverend Canon Martin Wharton (1983–1992)
- The Right Reverend Martin Wharton (1992—2011)
- The Right Reverend Martin Wharton CBE (2011–present)

== Sources ==
- "DodOnline". Archived from the original on 11 December 2006.

Church of England titles
Preceded by Peter Selby	Bishop of Kingston-upon-Thames; 1992–1997	Succeeded by Peter Price
Preceded by Andrew Graham	Bishop of Newcastle; 1997–2014	Succeeded by Christine Hardman
