= Peter Price (bishop) =

21st-century Anglican bishop

The Right Reverend Peter Price
- Bishop of Bath and Wells
- Church: Church of England
- Diocese: Bath and Wells
- Installed: 2001
- Term ended: 30 June 2013
- Predecessor: Jim Thompson
- Successor: Peter Hancock
- Other post: Area Bishop of Kingston (1997–2001)

Orders
- Ordination: 1975
- Consecration: 2 December 1997

Personal details
- Born: 17 May 1944 (age 82)
- Denomination: Anglican
- Residence: Bishop's Palace, Wells
- Spouse: Dee
- Children: 4 sons:
- Profession: formerly teacher
- Education: Redland College, Bristol

Member of the House of Lords
- Lord Spiritual
- Bishop of Bath and Wells; 18 November 2008 – 30 June 2013

Peter Bryan Price (born 17 May 1944) is a retired English Anglican bishop. He was the Bishop of Bath and Wells in the Church of England from 2001 to 30 June 2013. He sat in the House of Lords as one of the Lords Spiritual from 2008 until his retirement. He became chair of the board of trustees for the NGO Conciliation Resources in August 2013 but as of August 2024 is not listed as a trustee of that organisation. In 2015, he and his wife Dee co-founded the Burns Price Foundation, and as of August 2024 they both serve as trustees.

Price attended Oak Hill Theological College. He was ordained a deacon in 1974 and a priest in 1975. He has been chancellor of Southwark Cathedral, the area Bishop of Kingston, the chairman of the Southwark Diocesan Board of Mission and the general secretary of the United Society for the Propagation of the Gospel (USPG). He was consecrated a bishop on 2 December 1997 at by George Carey, Archbishop of Canterbury. He broadcasts for BBC World Service and Independent Radio in London. He was presented with the Coventry Cross of Nails in 1999, an award for his reconciliation efforts.

Price has over 40 years experience of reconciliation, beginning in Northern Ireland but including Latin America, Africa and the Middle East. In 2011 he was able to revisit friends in El Salvador, including one bishop, Medardo Gomez, who he was instrumental in saving from execution in a visit to the country, in 1988, during the civil war. While in the House of Lords, he used his influence to pressure politicians to find alternative and non-militarised solutions to some of the world's conflicts. In his final appearance in the House of Lords he urged G8 leaders to seize a "rare opportunity" for hope in resolving differences on Syria.

Price is the current bishop protector of the Anglican Pacifist Fellowship.

== Styles ==
- Peter Price Esq (1944–1975)
- The Revd Peter Price (1975–1988)
- The Revd Canon Peter Price (1988–1997)
- The Rt Revd Peter Price (1997–present)

Church of England titles
Preceded by Martin Wharton	Bishop of Kingston; 1997–2001	Succeeded by Richard Cheetham
Preceded by Jim Thompson	Bishop of Bath and Wells; 2001—2013	Succeeded by Peter Hancock
