= Gilpin, Nevada =

Unincorporated community located in the State of Nevada, United States of America

- Unincorporated area
- Location within Nevada Location within the United States
- Coordinates: 39°35′53″N 119°20′09″W
- Country: United States
- State: Nevada
- County: Storey
- Elevation: 4,147 ft (1,264 m)

Gilpin is former railroad siding, located in the far northeast region of Storey County, Nevada, United States.

The GNIS locates Gilpin on the south side of the Truckee River, which is where there was a non-agency siding between Thisbe and Fernley on the Southern Pacific Railroad. The siding was abandoned in 1959.

In the 1930s, the site of Gilpin was on the north side of the river in Washoe County. In 1905, Captain Matt Barach laid out a townsite at the Washoe County side. At that time a road to Olinghouse was planned but never built. Gilpin can be accessed via the Painted Rock exit on Interstate 80.

A nearby rest area on Interstate 80 is named Gilpin.
