= William Gilpin (bishop) =

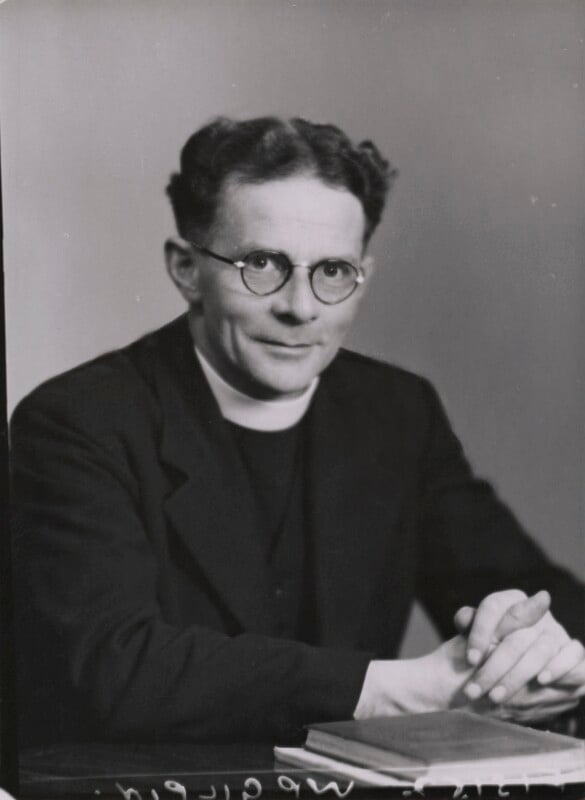
Gilpin in 1952

William Percy Gilpin (26 July 1902 – 4 January 1988) was a long serving Bishop of Kingston, Kingston-upon-Thames, England.

Gilpin was educated at King Edward's School, Birmingham and Keble College, Oxford. He was ordained in 1925, and was successively a curate in Solihull; chaplain of Chichester Theological College; Vicar of Manaccan, then Penzance; Director of Religious Education for the Diocese of Gloucester; and finally (before his ordination to the episcopate) the Archdeacon of Southwark. He retired to Ludlow, Shropshire, in 1970.

Church of England titles
Preceded by Frederick Ochterloney Taylor Hawkes	Bishop of Kingston; 1952–1970	Succeeded by Hugh Montefiore
