= Gilpin, Kentucky =

Gilpin
- Unincorporated community
- Location within the state of Kentucky Gilpin (the United States)
- Coordinates: 37°15′24″N 84°52′55″W
- Country: United States
- State: Kentucky
- County: Casey
- Elevation: 843 ft (257 m)
- Time zone: UTC-6 (Central (CST))
  - Summer (DST): UTC-5 (CST)
- GNIS feature ID: 508088

Gilpin is an unincorporated community in Casey County, Kentucky, United States.

A post office was established in the community then known as Shackelford in 1881. In 1887, postmaster William Gilpin renamed it after his own family.
