= Sally Gilpin =

English ballet dancer and choreographer

- Born: Sarah Patricia Canter; 19 September 1938; Marylebone, London, England
- Died: 28 September 2008 (aged 70); Salisbury, Wiltshire, England
- Occupation(s): Ballet dancer and choreographer
- Spouse: John Gilpin (m. 1960–1970)
- Children: 1
- Parents: Ernest Canter (father); Hilda Madeline Haddock (mother)

Sally Gilpin (19 September 1938 – 28 September 2008) was an English ballet dancer and choreographer.

== Biography ==
She was born as Sarah Patricia Canter to Ernest Canter (1908–1984) and Hilda Madeline née Haddock (1906–1979) [later Canter, Judd, and finally Rees].

She became a leading ballerina for the London Festival Ballet who danced in many roles in productions, such as The Nutcracker in 1962.

- She appeared in two films:
  - The Masque of the Red Death (1964)
  - Half a Sixpence (1967)
- She choreographed six films:
  - The Tragedy of Macbeth (1971)
  - Follow Me! (1971)
  - Percy's Progress (1974)
  - Timon of Athens (1981) (TV)
  - Antony and Cleopatra (1981) (TV)
  - The Beggar's Opera (1983) (TV)
- She choreographed one TV miniseries:
  - Smiley's People (miniseries) (1982)

== Personal life ==
From 27 August 1960 until 1970, she was married to the ballet dancer John Gilpin (1930–1983), by whom she had one daughter, Tracy (born 1962). Their wedding took place at St. Mary's Church.
