= Bishop of Kingston =

Episcopal title in England

The Bishop of Kingston (technically of Kingston upon Thames or, originally, of Kingston-on-Thames) is an episcopal title used by an area bishop of the Church of England Diocese of Southwark, in the Province of Canterbury, England. The title takes its name after Kingston upon Thames, a settlement in south-west London. The bishops suffragan of Kingston have been area bishops since the Southwark area scheme was founded in 1991.

On 15 December 2022, it was announced that Martin Gainsborough is to become the next area Bishop of Kingston during February 2023.

== List of bishops ==
Bishops of Kingston
| From | Until | Incumbent | Notes |
|---|---|---|---|
| 1905 | 1915 | Cecil Hook | |
| 1915 | 1922 | Samuel Taylor | |
| 1922 | 1927 | Percy Herbert | Translated to Blackburn |
| 1927 | 1952 | Frederick Hawkes | |
| 1952 | 1970 | William Gilpin | |
| 1970 | 1978 | Hugh Montefiore | Translated to Birmingham |
| 1978 | 1984 | Keith Sutton | Translated to Lichfield |
| 1984 | 1992 | Peter Selby | First area bishop from 1991; translated to Worcester |
| 1992 | 1997 | Martin Wharton | Translated to Newcastle |
| 1997 | 2001 | Peter Price | Translated to Bath and Wells |
| 2002 | 2022 | Richard Cheetham | Retired 17 October 2022. |
| 2023 | present | Martin Gainsborough | Consecrated 2 February 2023. |
