= Butterwick, Cumbria =

Hamlet in Cumbria, England

Coordinates: 54.56°N 2.75°W

Butterwick
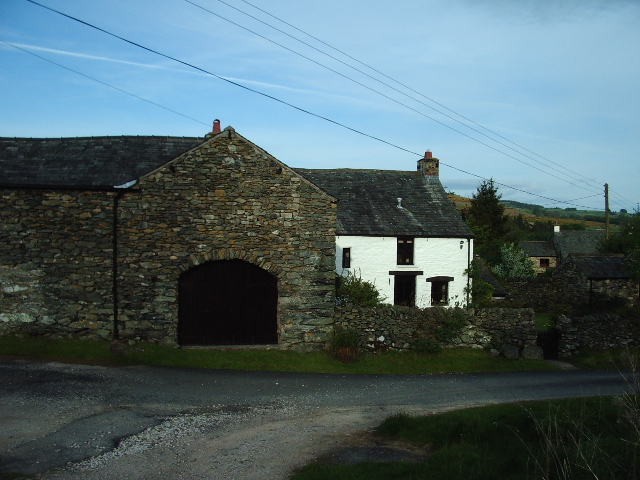
- Fell End Farm, Butterwick

- Location in Eden, Cumbria Location within Cumbria
- OS grid reference: NY5119
- Civil parish: Bampton
- Unitary authority: Westmorland and Furness
- Ceremonial county: Cumbria
- Region: North West
- Country: England
- Sovereign state: United Kingdom
- Post town: PENRITH
- Postcode district: CA10
- Dialling code: 01931
- Police: Cumbria
- Fire: Cumbria
- Ambulance: North West
- UK Parliament: Westmorland and Lonsdale

Butterwick is a hamlet in Cumbria, England, near the village of Helton.
