= George de Grey, 8th Baron Walsingham =

British soldier and peer (1884–1965)

Lieutenant Colonel The Right Honourable The Lord Walsingham DSO OBE OStJ JP DL

Personal details
- Born: George de Gray; 9 May 1884 Westminster, London
- Died: 29 November 1965 (aged 81)
- Spouse: Hyacinth Lambart Bouwens (after 1919)
- Relations: Edward Garnier (grandson); Thomas de Grey, 5th Baron Walsingham (grandfather)
- Children: 4
- Parent(s): John de Grey, 7th Baron Walsingham; Elizabeth Henrietta Grant

Military service
- Allegiance: United Kingdom
- Branch/service: Royal Norfolk Regiment
- Rank: Lieutenant colonel
- Battles/wars: World War I World War II

Lieutenant Colonel George de Grey, 8th Baron Walsingham DSO, OBE, OStJ, JP, DL (9 May 1884 – 29 November 1965) was a British soldier and peer.

== Early life ==
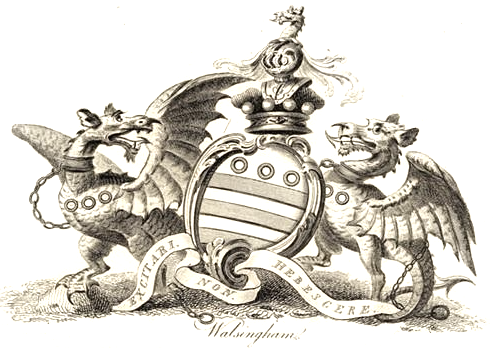
Baron Walsingham coat of arms

Walsingham was born on 9 May 1884 at Westminster, London. He was the son of John Augustus de Grey, 7th Baron Walsingham and the former Elizabeth Henrietta Grant. Among his siblings were Hon. Elizabeth Helen de Grey (wife of Maj. Henry Wynter Blathwayt), Hon. Margaret Henrietta de Grey (wife of Bethel Godefroy Bouwens and Cyril Fabian Ratcliff Johnston), Hon. Alice Mary de Grey (wife of Philip Wade), and Hon. Richard Patrick de Grey (husband of Cynthia Estelle Myring and Dorothy Knight).

His paternal grandparents were Thomas de Grey, 5th Baron Walsingham and the former Hon. Emily Elizabeth Julia Thellusson (a daughter and coheiress of John Thellusson, 2nd Baron Rendlesham). His maternal grandfather, Patrick Grant, a Scottish merchant with the East India Company, was a son of James Grant, 11th of Glenmoriston.

He was educated at Eton College before attending the Royal Military College, Sandhurst.

== Career ==
Walsingham fought in the World War I, where he was wounded three times and was mentioned in dispatches four times. He was awarded the Distinguished Service Order in 1915. He gained the rank of Lieutenant Colonel in the Royal Norfolk Regiment. He was appointed Officer of the Order of the British Empire and was appointed Officer of the Order of Saint John and, later, served in World War II.

Upon the death of his father on 21 March 1929, he succeeded as the 8th Baron Walsingham, of Walsingham, Norfolk and the following year became a Justice of the Peace for Norfolk in 1930 and was made Deputy Lieutenant of Norfolk in 1959.

== Personal life ==
On 29 April 1919, Grey was married to Hyacinth Lambart Bouwens, a daughter of Lt.-Col. Lambart Henry Bouwens. Together, they were the parents of:

- Hon. Lavender Hyacinth de Grey (1923–2010), who married Col. William d'Arcy Garnier, a son of Brigadier Alan Parry Garnier, in 1946.
- John de Grey, 9th Baron Walsingham (b. 1925), a Lt.-Col. who married Wendy Elizabeth Hoare, a daughter of Edward Sidney Hoare, in 1963.
- Hon. Margaret Isolda de Grey (1926-2017), who married the High Sheriff of Devon, Maj. Geoffrey Edward Ford North.
- Hon. Katharine Odeyne de Grey (b. 1928), who married George Herbert, 7th Earl of Powis, son of Rt. Rev. Percy Mark Herbert, in 1949.

He died on 29 November 1965 at age 81.

=== Descendants ===
Through his eldest daughter Lavender, he was a grandfather of Edward Garnier (b. 1952), the former Solicitor General for England and Wales who was created a life peer as Baron Garnier in 2018.

Peerage of Great Britain
Preceded by John Augustus de Grey	Baron Walsingham; 1929–1965	Succeeded by John de Grey
