= John Gilpin (dancer) =

British dancer and actor (1930–1983)

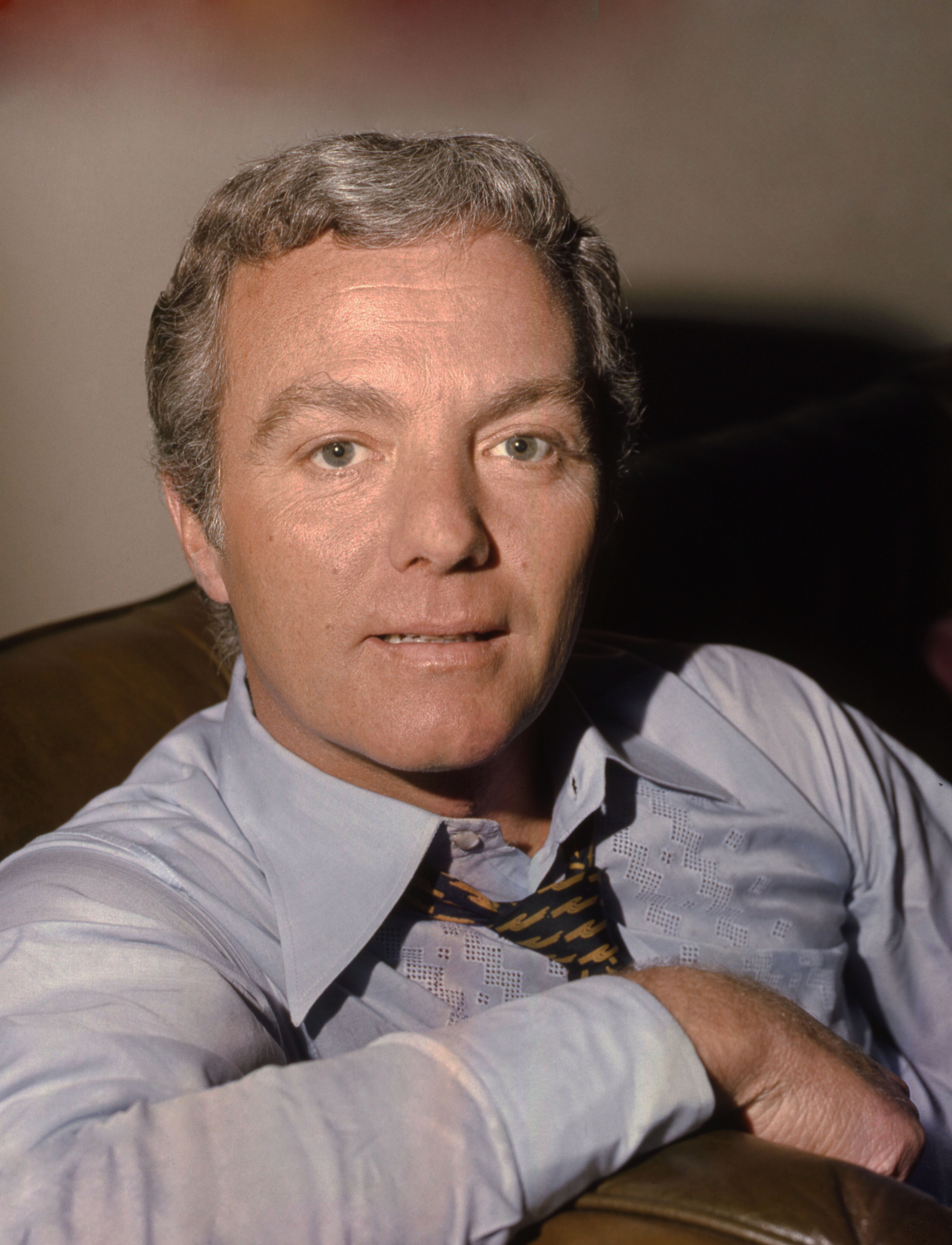
- John Gilpin by Allan Warren
- Born: John Brian Gilpin; 10 February 1930; Southsea, Hampshire, England
- Died: 5 September 1983 (aged 53); London, England
- Resting place: Chapel of Peace, Monaco
- Occupations: Ballet dancer and actor
- Spouses: Sally Judd (m. 1960–1970) Princess Antoinette, Baroness of Massy (m. 1983)
- Children: 1

John Brian Gilpin (10 February 1930 – 5 September 1983) was a leading English ballet dancer and actor.

== Life and career ==
John Brian Gilpin was the son of William John Gilpin (1903–1967) and Lilian May née Lendon (1902–1986). He had a twin brother, Anthony.

Gilpin started dance lessons at the age of seven, studying at the Arts Educational and Ballet Rambert schools.

As a child he appeared in several West End stage successes and in films, such as They Were Sisters and The Years Between, opposite Michael Redgrave.

He won the Adeline Genée Gold Medal in 1943, the youngest winner to do so.

Gilpin joined Ballet Rambert in 1945, becoming a principal. He went with the company on their tour of Australia and New Zealand in 1947–49.

He danced the 1949 season with Roland Petit's company, and the 1950 season with Le Grand Ballet du Marquis de Cuevas in Monte Carlo.

Gilpin was Principal Dancer of the London Festival Ballet for over twenty years from its inauguration in 1950 until leg injuries forced his retirement. His performances in Le Spectre de la Rose and Giselle were particularly acclaimed. Gilpin also guested with the Royal Ballet and American Ballet Theatre. He created multiple roles, including The Sailor's Return in 1947, Le Rêve de Léonor in 1949, Esmeralda in 1954, and Variations for Four in 1957.

Between 1965 and 1967 Gilpin served London Festival Ballet as its artistic director.

Gilpin appeared in the play Invitation to the Dance by Maxim Mazumdar which was based on his life. In 1981 he starred in Italy as Oberon in Lindsay Kemp's Midsummer Night's Dream. In 1957, Gilpin won the Nijinsky Prize in Paris. His partners included Danilova, Fonteyn, Markova, Sibley, Park, Seymour and Shearer.

Gilpin was the recipient of several prizes: the Vaslav Nijinsky (1958), the Etoile d'Or (1964) and the Queen Elizabeth II Coronation Award for services to British Ballet (1963).

In 1982 Gilpin published an autobiography, A Dance With Life.

He was twice married:

- The ballet dancer and choreographer Sally Judd (London, 27 August 1960 – 1970); one daughter, Tracy (born 1962).
- Princess Antoinette, Baroness of Massy (Monaco, 28 July 1983 – 5 September 1983).

== Death ==
He died from a heart attack, six weeks after marrying his second wife, Princess Antoinette, Baroness of Massy.
