= Martin Gainsborough =

British Anglican priest(born 1966)

The Right Reverend Dr Martin Gainsborough
- Bishop of Kingston
- Diocese: Diocese of Southwark
- In office: 2023 to present
- Predecessor: Richard Cheetham
- Other posts: Professor, Bristol University(2012–2018); Canon, Bristol Cathedral (2019–2023)

Orders
- Ordination: 2011 by Mike Hill
- Consecration: 2023 by Justin Welby

Personal details
- Born: Jonathan Martin Gainsborough; 1966 (age 59–60)
- Denomination: Anglicanism
- Spouse: Mary
- Children: 3
- Education: SOAS

Jonathan Martin Gainsborough (born 1966) is a British Anglican bishop. Since February 2023, he has served as the Bishop of Kingston, an area bishop in the Diocese of Southwark. His maternal grandfather is Bishop John Hunter, who served in the Church in South Africa.

== Early life and education ==
Gainsborough was born in 1966. He was educated at Dulwich College, an all-boys independent school in London. He studied history at the University of Bristol, graduating with a Bachelor of Arts degree in 1989, and later at the School of Oriental and African Studies, University of London, graduating with a Master of Arts (MA) degree in 1991, a Master of Science (MSc) degree in 1995, and a Doctor of Philosophy (PhD) degree in 2001.

== Career ==
=== Academic career ===
Following his doctorate, he was a British Academy postdoctoral research fellow in the Department of Politics and International Studies of the University of Warwick from 2001 to 2003. He was then a lecturer in Southeast Asian politics at the School of Oriental and African Studies, University of London, before moving to the University of Bristol as a lecturer in development politics in 2005. He was promoted to reader in 2008, and was made Professor of Development Politics in 2012. He is an expert on the politics of modern Vietnam, having published widely in this field. His writings in theology straddle ecclesiology, missiology and political theology.

As well as numerous journal articles, he is the author of Changing Political Economy of Vietnam: the Case of Ho Chi Minh City (2002), Vietnam: Rethinking the state (2010), and Politics and Mission: Rediscovering the Political Power of What Christians Do (2023).

=== Ordained ministry ===
Having trained on the Southern Theological Education and Training Scheme, Gainsborough was ordained in the Church of England as a deacon in 2010 and as a priest in 2011. He served his curacy at St Luke's Church, Barton Hill in the Diocese of Bristol from 2010 to 2013, and then served as its priest-in-charge from 2013 to 2016. After that he was canon theologian at Bristol Cathedral from 2016 until 2018, and then as Bishop's Chaplain to the Bishop of Bristol until his appointment to the episcopate.

In 2013-14 Gainsborough undertook commando training with the Royal Marines for which he was awarded the coveted green beret. He served as Chaplain to Royal Marines Reserve Bristol until 2023.

On 16 December 2022, it was announced that Gainsborough would become the next Bishop of Kingston. He was consecrated a bishop on 2 February 2023 by Justin Welby, Archbishop of Canterbury, during a service at Canterbury Cathedral.

Gainsborough is Chair of Trustees of St Augustine's Theological College, Chair of Council of Lambeth Research Degrees in Theology, and a member of the Church of England's Environment Working Group. Gainsborough also leads the Diocese of Southwark's Covenant Agreement work with the Diocese of Jerusalem.

In 2025 Gainsborough ran the 267 mile Pennine Way with his Border Collie, Jem, covering the equivalent of ten marathons in ten days and raising £40,000 for the Kingston-Matabeleland Link, which he leads.

Church of England titles
Preceded by Richard Cheetham	Bishop of Kingston; 2023 to present	Incumbent
