= Pendant (art) =

Word describing one of two artworks conceived as a pair

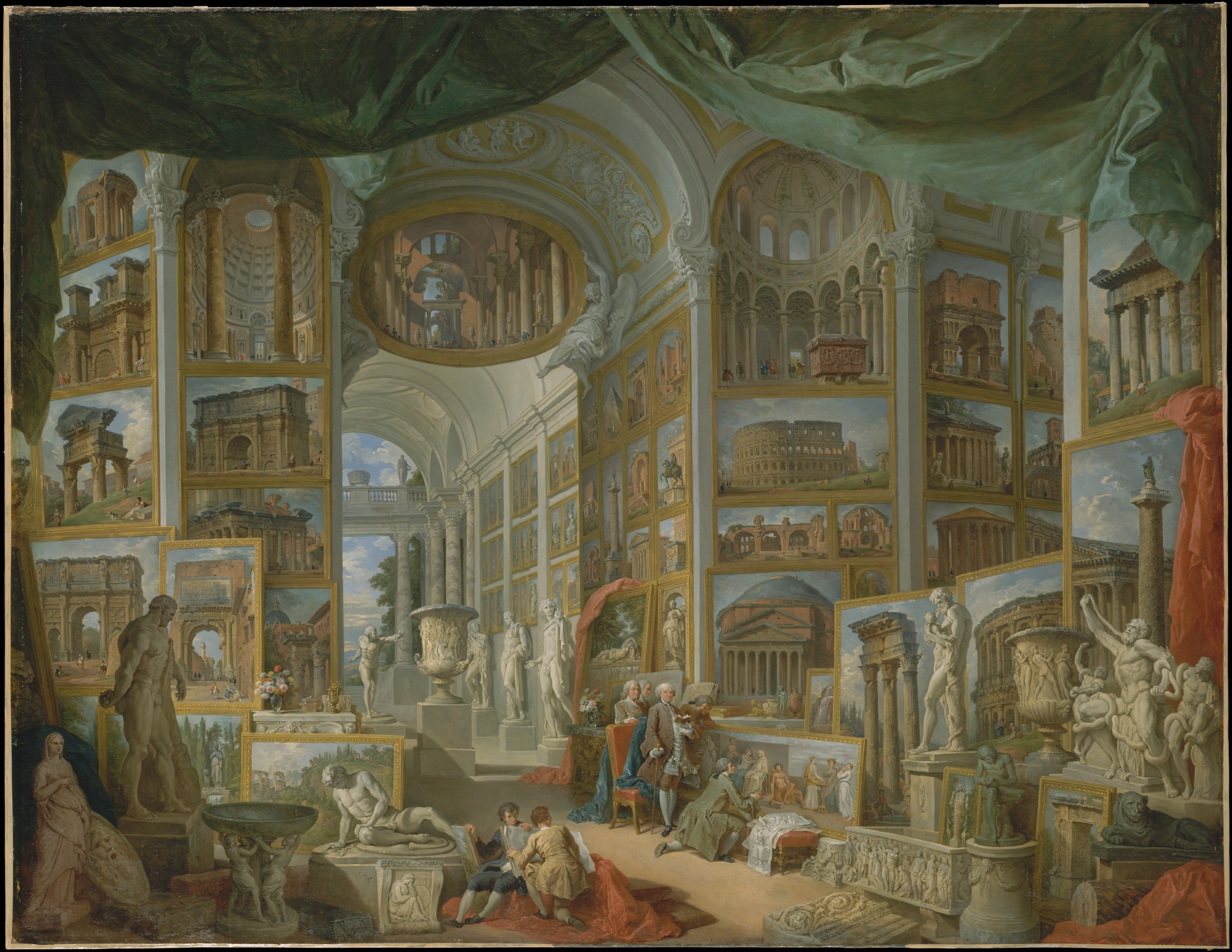
Ancient Rome

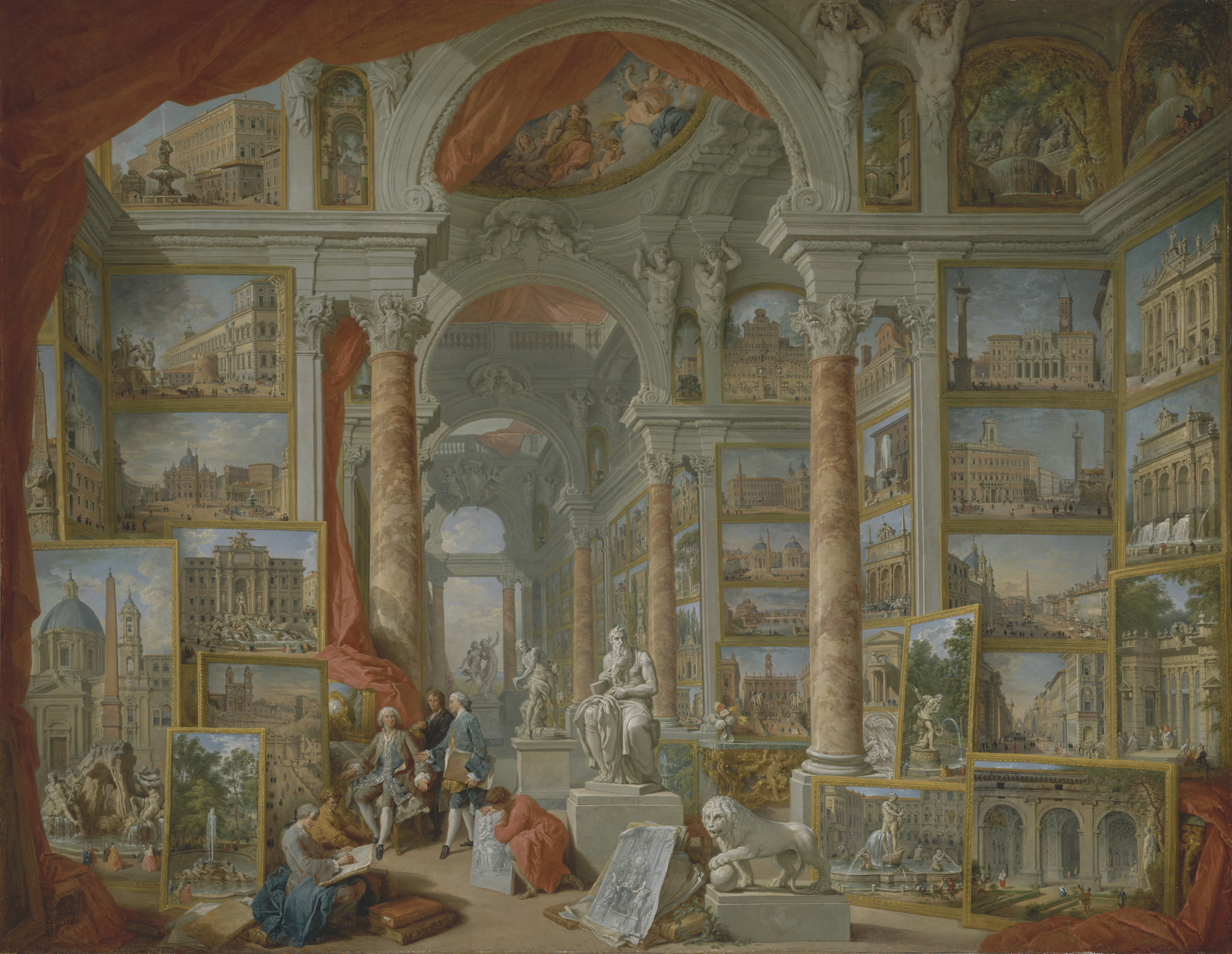
Modern Rome

A pair of pendants by Giovanni Paolo Panini (1691–1765) hung on the same wall in the Metropolitan Museum of Art, separated by several other paintings.

In art, a pendant is one of two paintings, statues, reliefs or other type of works of art intended as a pair. Typically, pendants are related thematically to each other and are displayed in close proximity. For example, pairs of portraits of married couples are very common, as are symmetrically arranged statues flanking an altar.

Diptych differs from a pendant in that two images, reliefs, etc., are connected by hinges or similar means and cannot be separated.

== How they work ==
Pendants may be the work of a single artist or of two artists, who in some instances might be in competition with one another. An example of the latter case is the pairing of the marble groups The Triumph of Faith over Idolatry by Jean-Baptiste Théodon and Religion Overthrowing Heresy and Hatred by Pierre Le Gros the Younger on the Altar of Saint Ignatius of Loyola (1695–1697/98), in the Church of the Gesù, Rome.

When J. M. W. Turner bequeathed two of his paintings to the National Gallery in London with the clause that they should in perpetuity hang next to two landscape paintings by Claude Lorrain, he turned Claude's paintings into de facto pendants, although they were not originally intended as such.

Many historic pendants have been separated over the years.

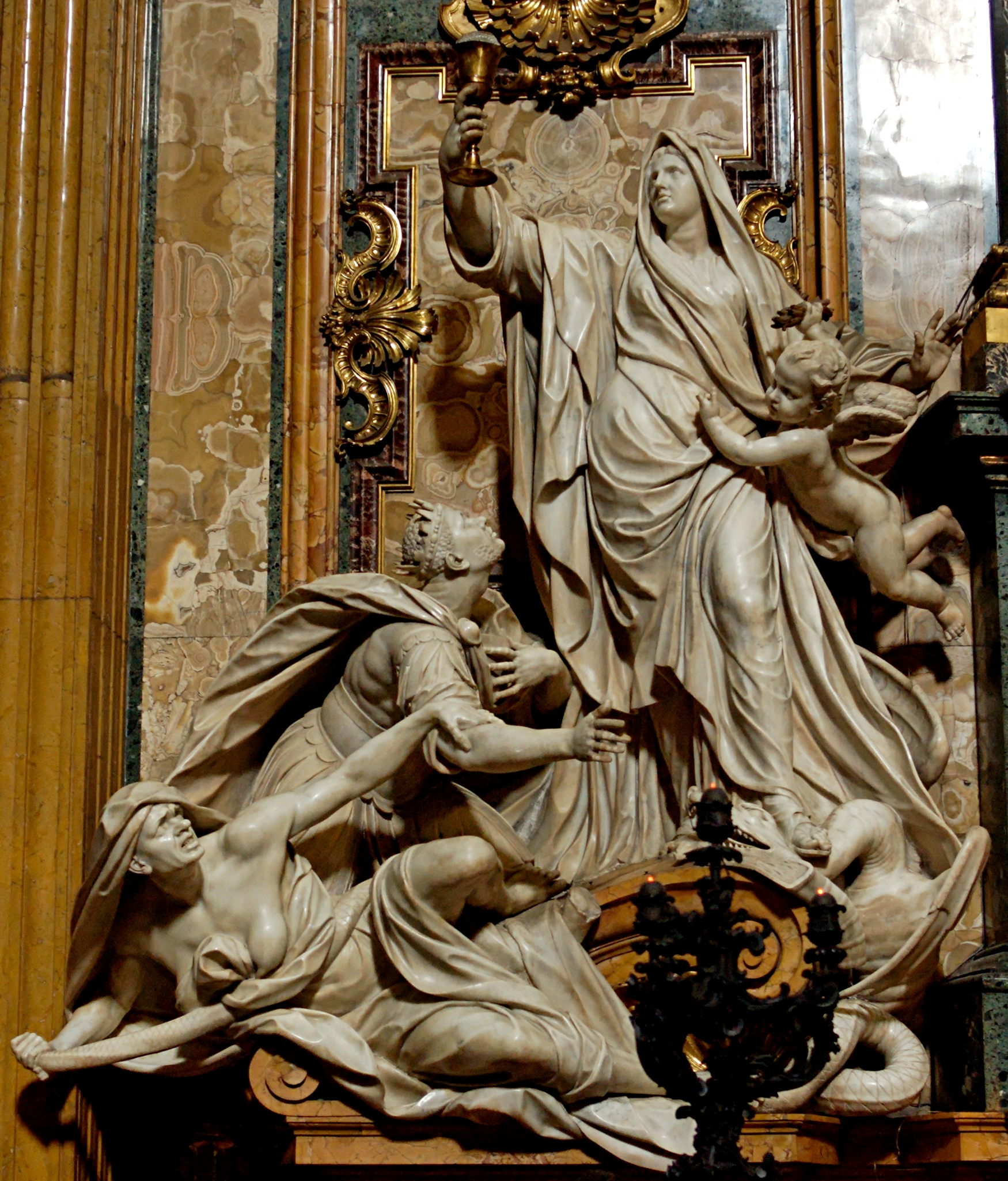
Jean-Baptiste Théodon: Triumph of Faith over Idolatry

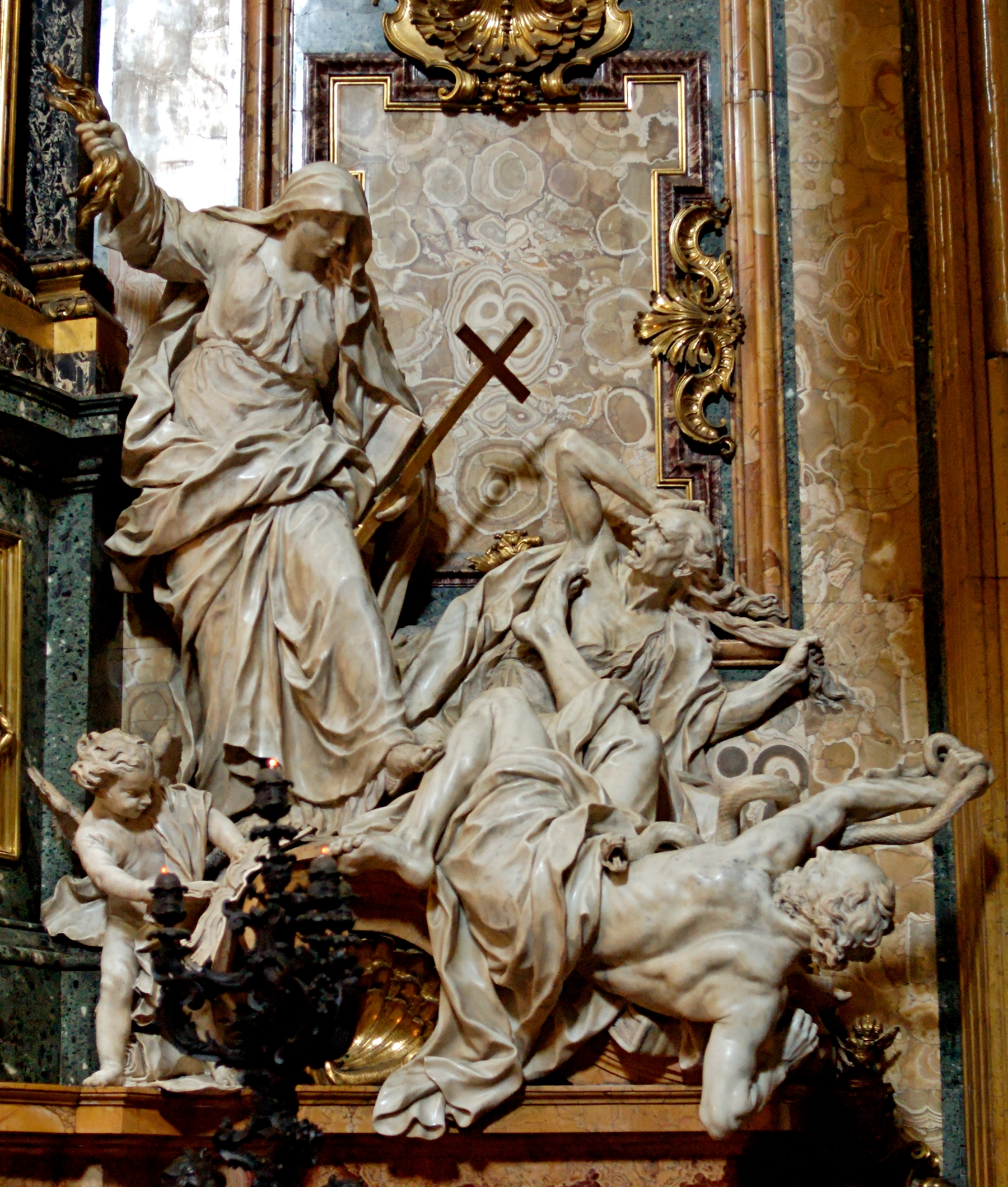
Pierre Le Gros: Religion Overthrowing Heresy and Hatred

Pendants on the Altar of Saint Ignatius of Loyola, 1695–1697/98, Rome, Church of the Gesù.

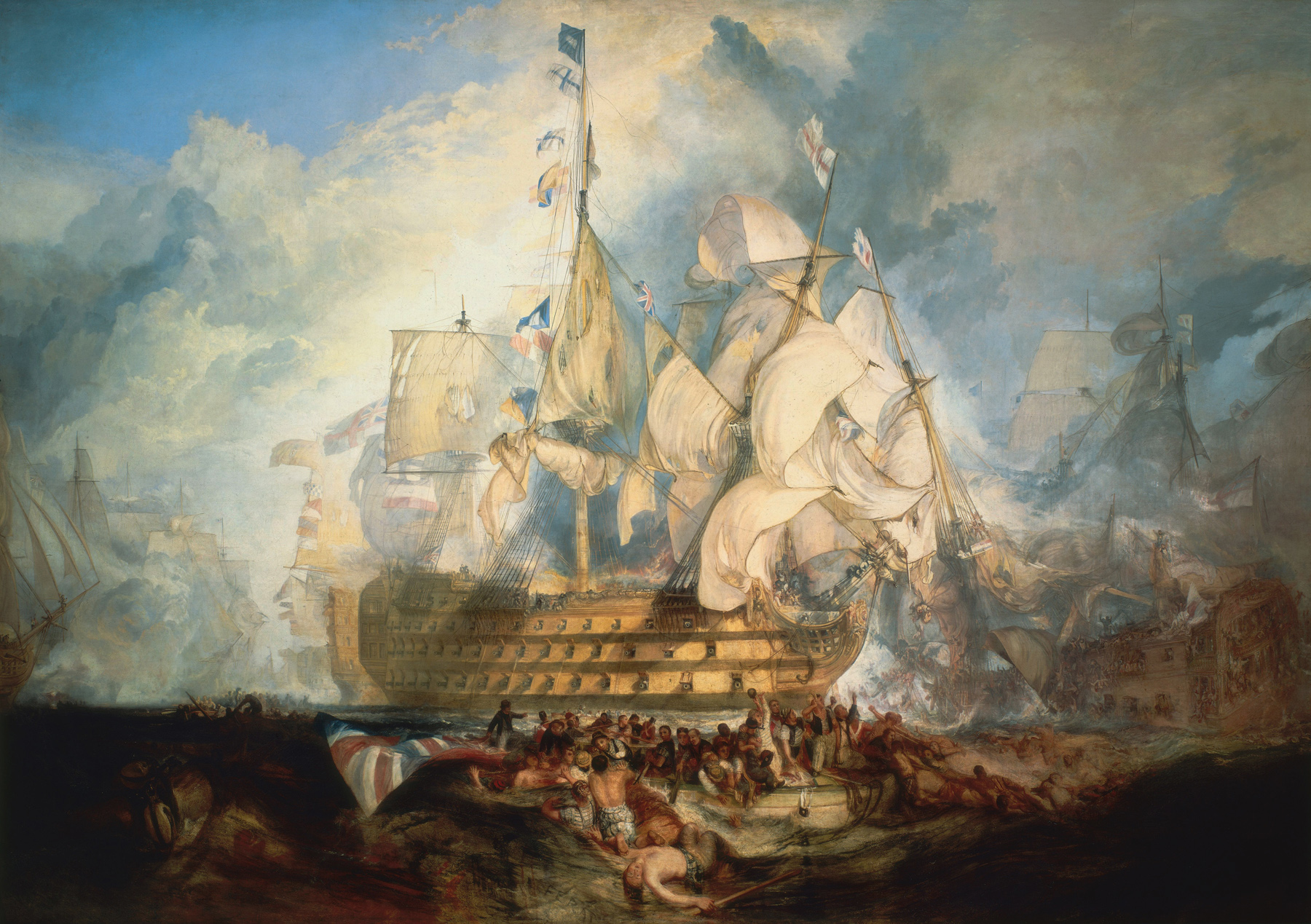
Turner: The Battle of Trafalgar

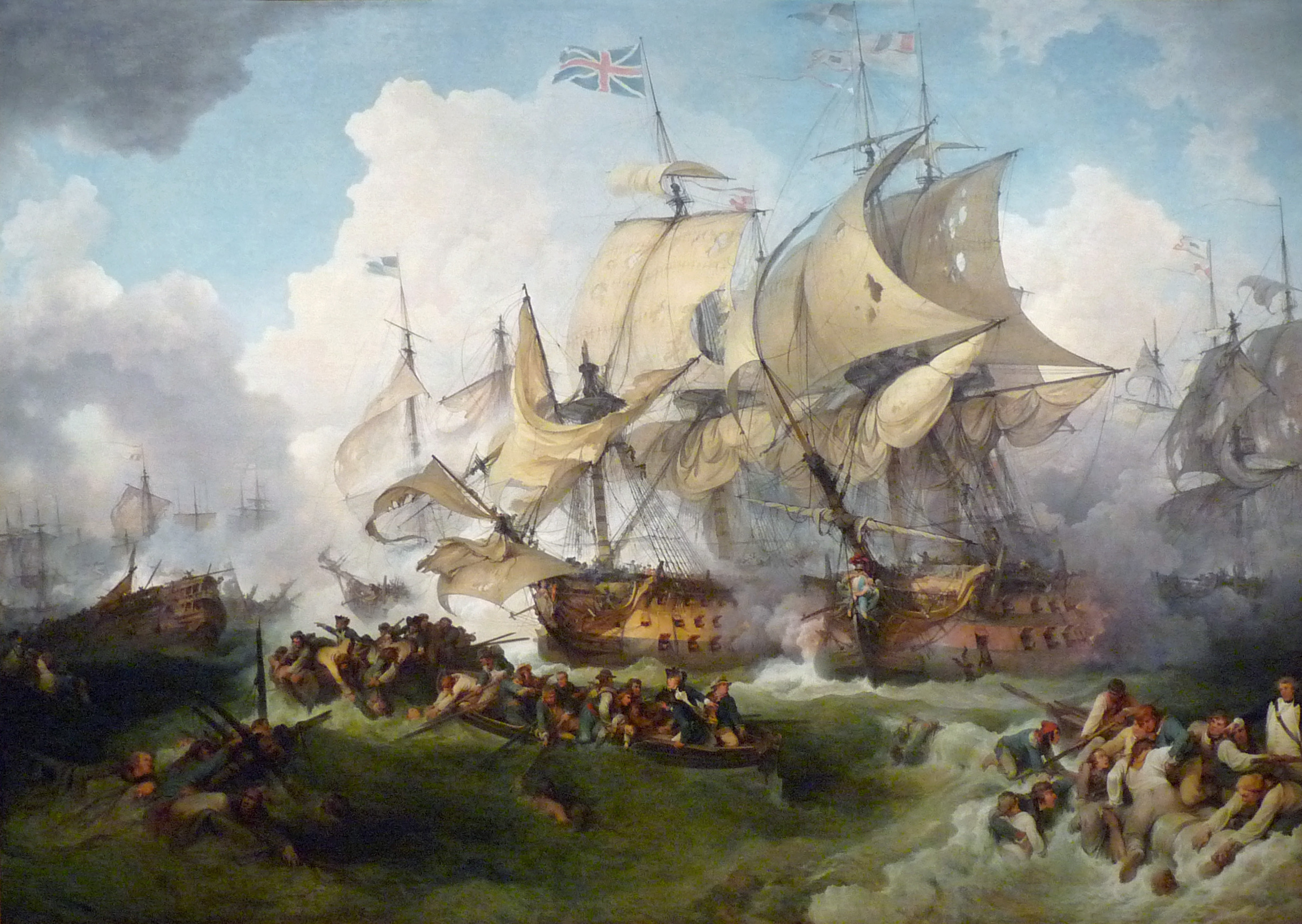
Loutherbourg: Lord Howe's Action, or the Glorious First of June

Royal commissioned as pendant pieces.
