= Lord Howe's Action, or the Glorious First of June =

1795 painting by Philip James de Loutherbourg

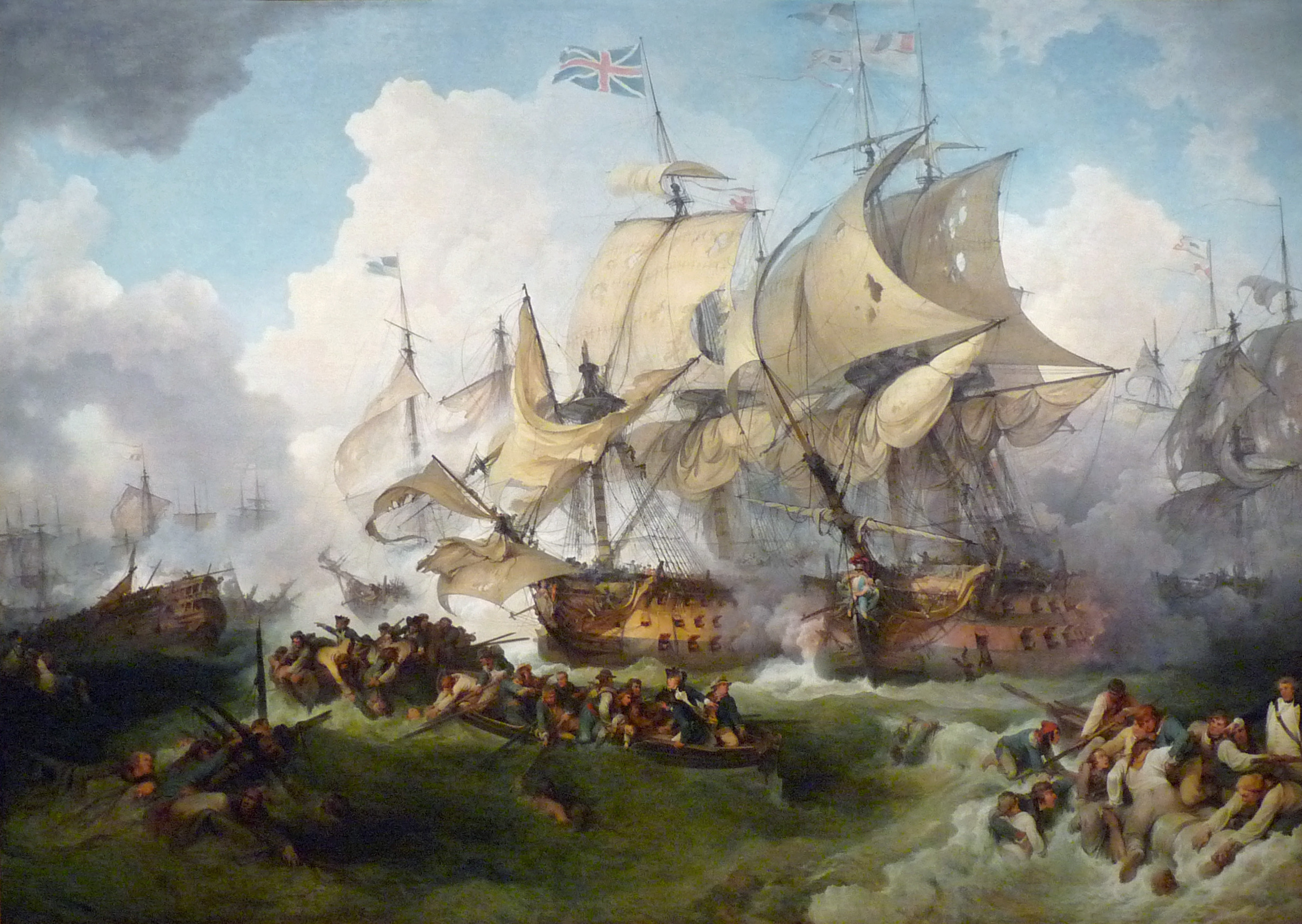
- Artist: Philip James de Loutherbourg
- Year: 1795
- Medium: Oil on canvas
- Dimensions: 266.5 cm × 373.5 cm (104.9 in × 147.0 in)
- Location: Queen's House (NMM); London

Lord Howe's Action, or the Glorious First of June is a 1795 painting by Philip James de Loutherbourg of the victory of British naval forces under Lord Howe over a French force led by Louis Thomas Villaret de Joyeuse on the Glorious First of June 1794. After time in the Royal Collection of George IV, it is in the collection of the National Maritime Museum and on display in the ground floor of its Queen's House.

== Historical background ==
The painting was commissioned by V. and R. Green and Christian von Mechel, engravers and publishers, for £500. They had in 1793 commissioned the equally large The Siege of Valenciennes from him, and this painting of the naval battle was intended to accompany it. Both paintings were intended for engraving (prints of them were produced by James Fittler, with 'Glorious First' coming out in January 1799 and 'Valenciennes' in 1801) and public exhibition (from 2 March 1795 at the Historic Gallery, Pall Mall, thus garnering interest for the images' publication, and on tour after their sale to Mr T. Vernon of Liverpool in 1799). James Gillray, as with Louthebourg's 'Valenciennes', gave Louthebourg help with painting the figures (Gillray had accompanied the army carrying out the siege).

Shown at Edinburgh in 1800, Vernon later sold them separately, with the 'Valenciennes' eventually finishing up in Lord Hesketh's collection at Easton Neston. The 'Glorious First' was purchased early in the 19th century for the Royal Collection by the Prince of Wales, who displayed it at St James's Palace and - after his accession to the throne in 1820 - commissioned J. M. W. Turner's The Battle of Trafalgar as a pendant for it. However, Turner's piece was criticised for perceived factual inaccuracies, and so George gave both the 'Trafalgar' and 'Glorious First' to the Naval Gallery at Greenwich Hospital in 1829 as one of his last gifts to them.

== Description ==
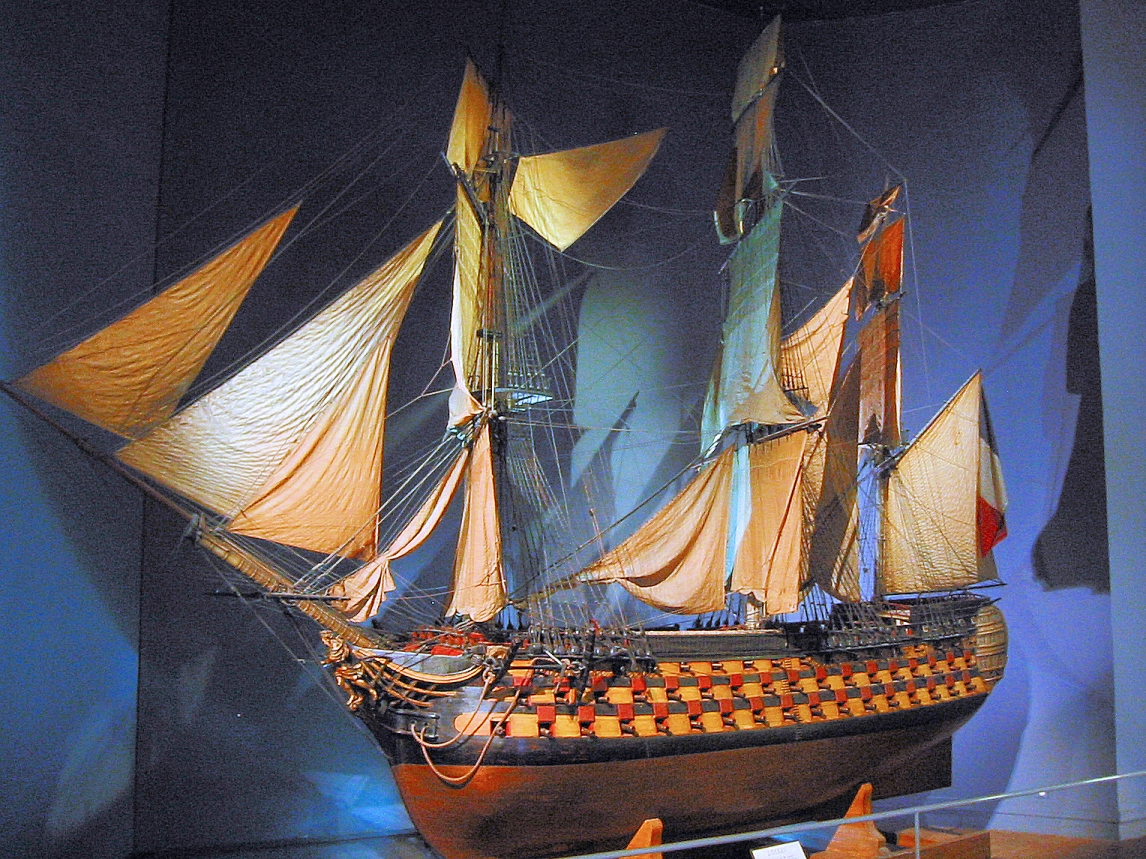
A ship model of the Montagne

The signal flag "S"

The French Revolutionary ensign until May 1794

In the centre are the two flagships are depicted fighting each other; HMS Queen Charlotte is to the left and Montagne to the right, with bodies falling from the gunports of the latter. The pair did engage during the battle, but never in the broadside position shown in the painting, and Queen Charlotte only lost her fore-topmast whilst already well astern of Montagne, rather than during a broadside engagement shown here. This wrongly makes it appear that Queen Charlotte dropped behind Montagne due to the loss of this mast and thus failed to capture her, and led to criticism of the painting by Lord Howe and James Bowen; Bowen commented that Queen Charlotte would have captured Montagne if such a broadside engagement as shown had occurred in reality and that the painting was thus a slur on Queen Charlotte's honour.

In the extreme right is the port bow of an English ship (probably HMS Brunswick), behind which is another French ship (flying, like the Montagne, the signal flag S from one of her masts), whilst in the left foreground is shown the port side of Vengeur du Peuple, sinking after a long and fatal duel with Brunswick, and beyond Vengeur du Peuple are other ships' topsails, just showing above the smoke of battle. The French ships are shown flying the early Revolutionary naval ensign (with the French tricolour added to the upper quadrant of the Bourbon white naval ensign), the only major action the French fleet fought under it. It had officially been replaced by the new (and current) tricolour in May 1794, but the new pattern had not arrived when Villaret-Joyeuse's ships set sail.

== See also ==
- Lord Howe on the Deck of the Queen Charlotte, a 1794 painting of the battle by Mather Brown
