= The Battle of Trafalgar (Turner) =

Painting by J. M. W. Turner

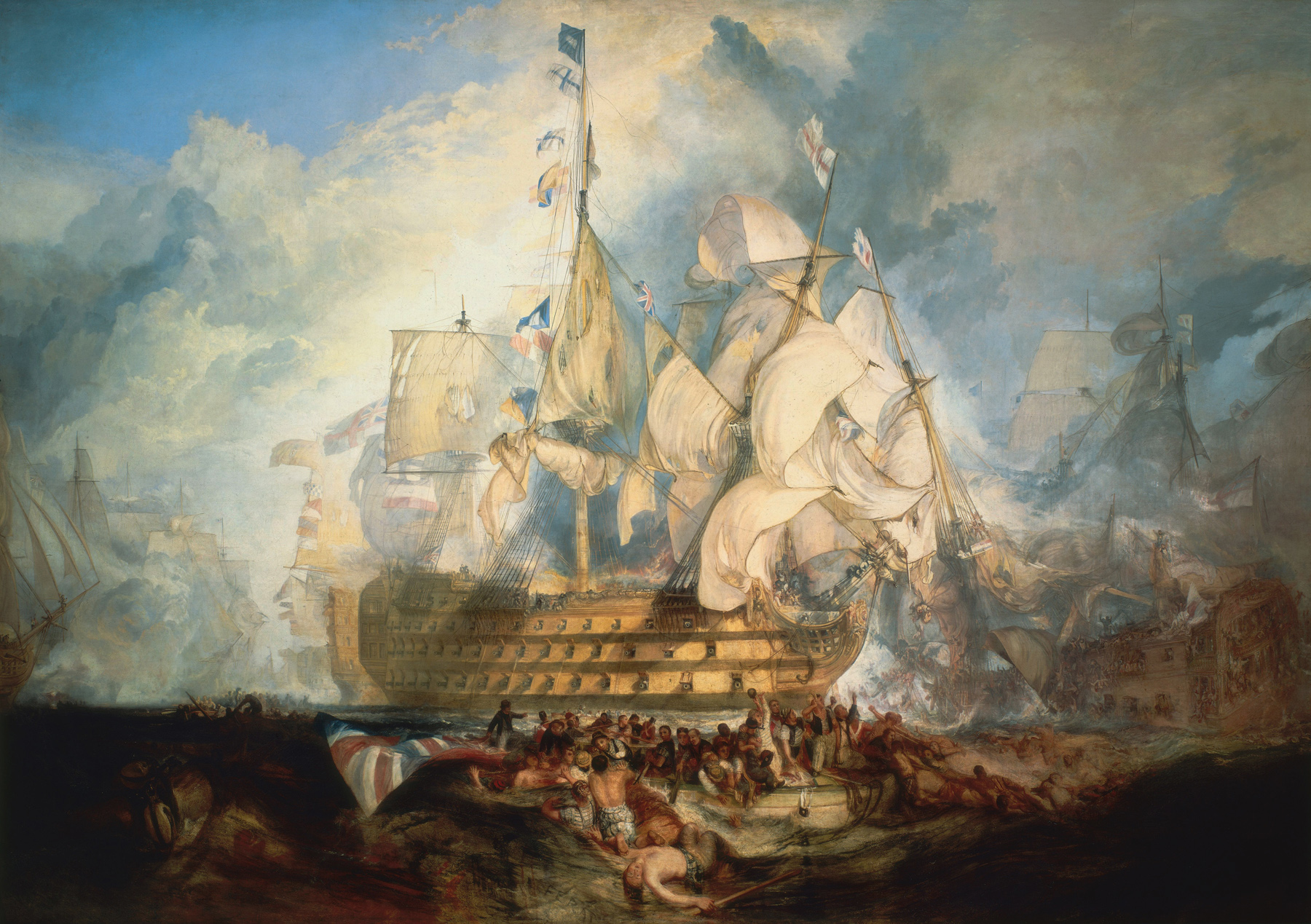
- The Battle of Trafalgar, 21 October 1805
- Artist: J. M. W. Turner
- Year: 1822–1824
- Medium: oil on canvas
- Dimensions: 261.5 cm × 368.5 cm (103.0 in × 145.1 in)
- Location: National Maritime Museum, Greenwich, London
- Website: rmg.co.uk/...12057

The Battle of Trafalgar, 21 October 1805 is a painting of 1822 by the British artist J. M. W. Turner. It was commissioned by King George IV as a part of a series of works to decorate three state reception rooms in St James's Palace and link the Hanoverian dynasty with military success. This work was Turner's only royal commission, and was to stand as the pendant piece to Philippe-Jacques de Loutherbourg's Lord Howe's action, or the Glorious First of June. This massive history painting measures 2,615 millimetres (8 ft 6 15/16 in) x 3,685 millimetres (12 ft 1 1/16 in) and is his largest work. It was given to Greenwich Hospital shortly after its original installation. The painting now hangs in the National Maritime Museum, also in Greenwich, London.

== History ==
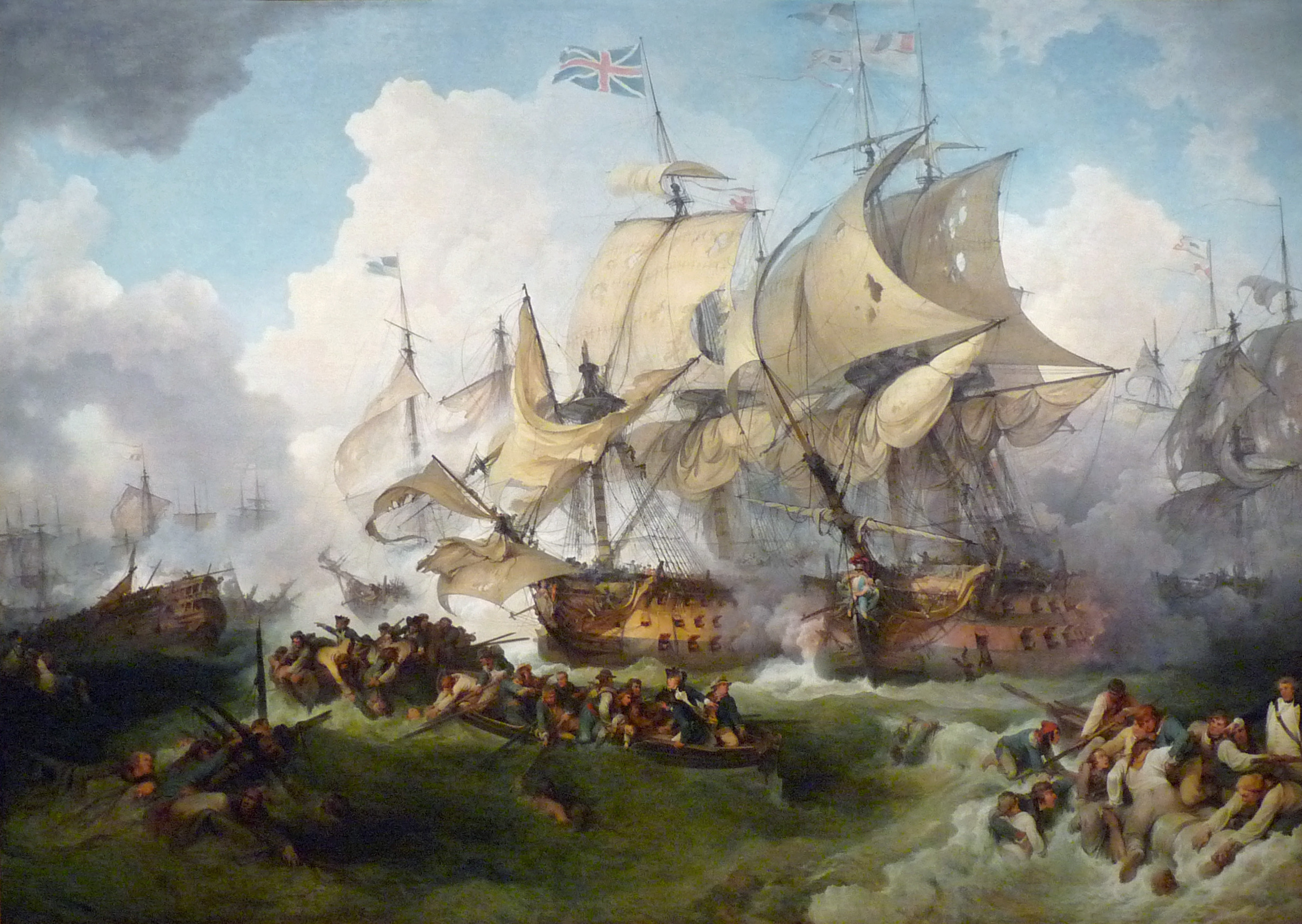
Lord Howe's Action, or the Glorious First of June (Philip James de Loutherbourg, 1795)

The painting depicts a scene from the Battle of Trafalgar, which fought was fought on 21 October 1805 between a British fleet under Horatio Nelson and a Franco-Spanish fleet under Pierre-Charles Villeneuve and Federico Gravina off Cape Trafalgar. Nelson's fleet gained a decisive victory, capturing or destroying 18 ships of the line while losing none of their own. Prior to the battle Nelson decided to split his fleet into two columns, one led by him and the other by his subordinate Cuthbert Collingwood, to attack the Franco-Spanish fleet perpendicular to their line of battle. At the height of the battle Nelson mortally wounded by French gunfire. Despite the loss of Nelson, the victory at Trafalgar was met with widespread rejoicing in Britain and ended any real effort by Napoleon to invade Britain. Following the battle, the British public campaigned for paintings of the engagement to be created. The importance of Nelson and his tactics are referenced in Victory's dominating position in the scene, the execution as a history painting, and Turner's care in rendering all elements of the scene.

== Role as a history painting ==
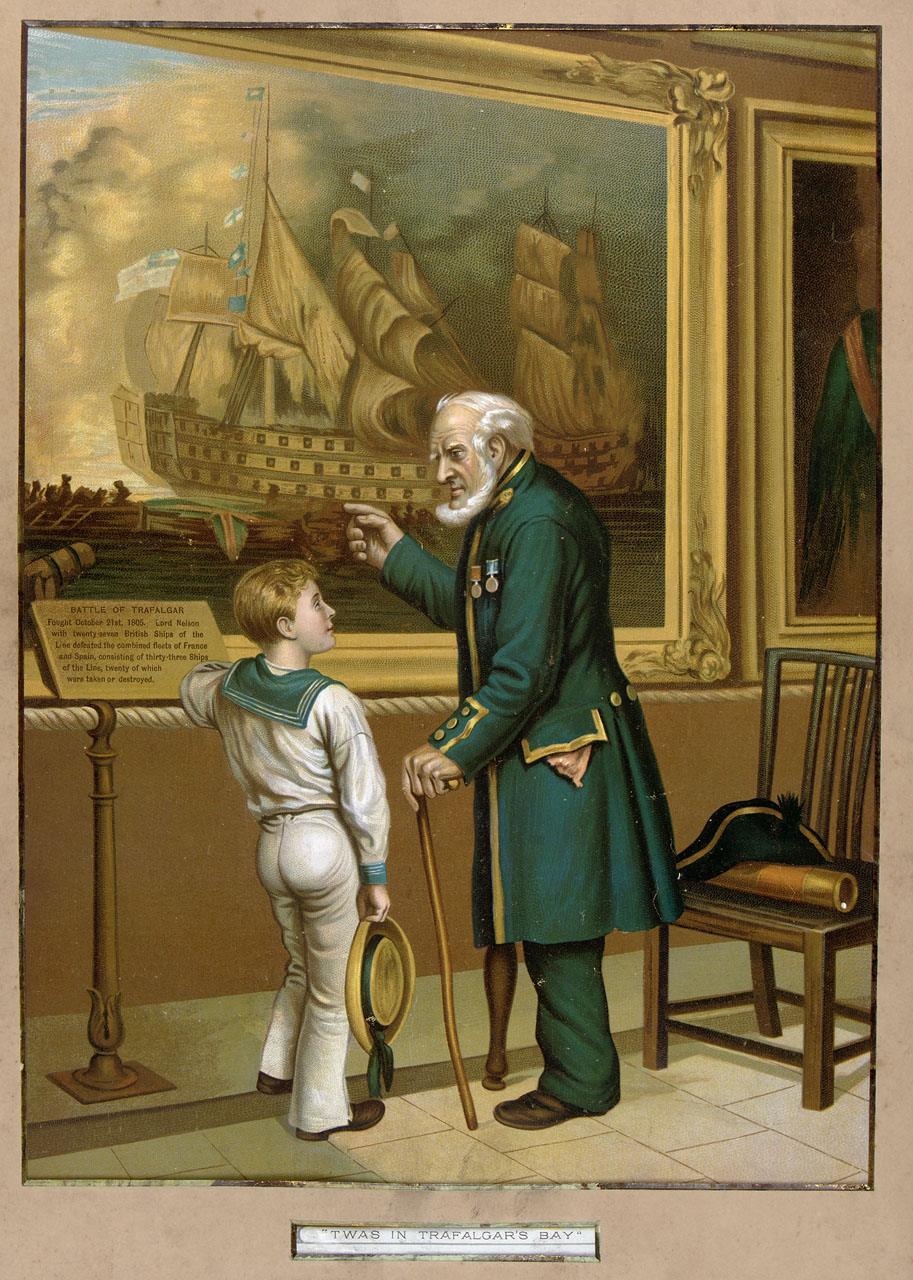
'Twas in Trafalgar's Bay' (Turner's 'Trafalgar' explained by a Greenwich Pensioner)

A history painting is traditionally defined as a large-scale work depicting a scene from the Bible, mythology, or classical history. Generally regarded as the height of artistic genres, Turner recognizes this and paints The Battle of Trafalgar as a history painting depicting a contemporary event and as a patchwork scene composed of different moments portrayed as being simultaneous. Turner knows the importance of this genre and employs it to further the significance of the contemporary scene. This action firmly cements the work as being of great national significance and affirms Britain as a great maritime power. In the pursuit of these ideals and significance, Turner took several moments from the battle, across several days, and merged them into one moment in one scene. This then represents Turner's desire to take the battle and use it to create something of general, philosophical, and national significance. This aspect, along with the pyramidal composition reference triumph and sacrifice reaffirm this work's place as a history painting, despite it not depicting one scene from ancient history, religion, or mythology.

The realism of the scene is visible in the flags of the masts, which deliver part of the message England expects that every man will do his duty...

== Studies ==
The British were striving to assert their position as the world's dominant naval power; with their victory in this battle they were successful and with this painting that becomes evident. Turner had a great deal of personal interest and investment in this work and with the history of the Battle of Trafalgar in general. Turner made several sketches immediately after the battle, careful studies of the ships and their rigging, and close details of the uniforms. The most notable of these early works was The Battle of Trafalgar, as Seen from the Mizen Starboard Shrouds of the Victory. This work was well received and provided the foundation from which Turner would develop Trafalgar into a scene representing an overall account of the whole battle. This earlier depiction is closer to Turner's style in that it leans away from traditional maritime paintings and more toward the ambiguity and sublime that Turner would later be known for. In preparation for Trafalgar Turner created two preparatory oil sketches, with the First Sketch for 'The Battle of Trafalgar' aligning its composition with the traditional maritime paintings. The Second Sketch for 'The Battle of Trafalgar' moves away from this traditional style and more closely resembles his final product with a more organized chaos via the build-up of clouds and people in the foreground. Despite this work being a commission, Turner chooses to depict the final work in a style that moves away from conventional practices and closer to his original work and personal style further indicating his personal connection with Trafalgar. While the subject of the piece is evident, there are elements of ambiguity suggesting the sublime, the dissolution of space via strokes of pure paint, and the symmetry between human and natural forces.

== See also ==
- List of paintings by J. M. W. Turner

== Bibliography ==
- Czisnik, Marianne (October 2004). "Admiral Nelson's Tactics at the Battle of Trafalgar". History. 89 (4). Wiley: 549–559. doi:10.1111/j.0018-2648.2004.t01-1-00312.x. JSTOR 24427628.
- Quilley, Geoff (2011). Empire to Nation: Art, History, and the Visualization of Maritime Britain 1768–1829. New Haven, Connecticut: Yale University Press. p. 294. ISBN 9780300175684.
