= Lord Howe on the Deck of the Queen Charlotte =

Painting by Mather Brown

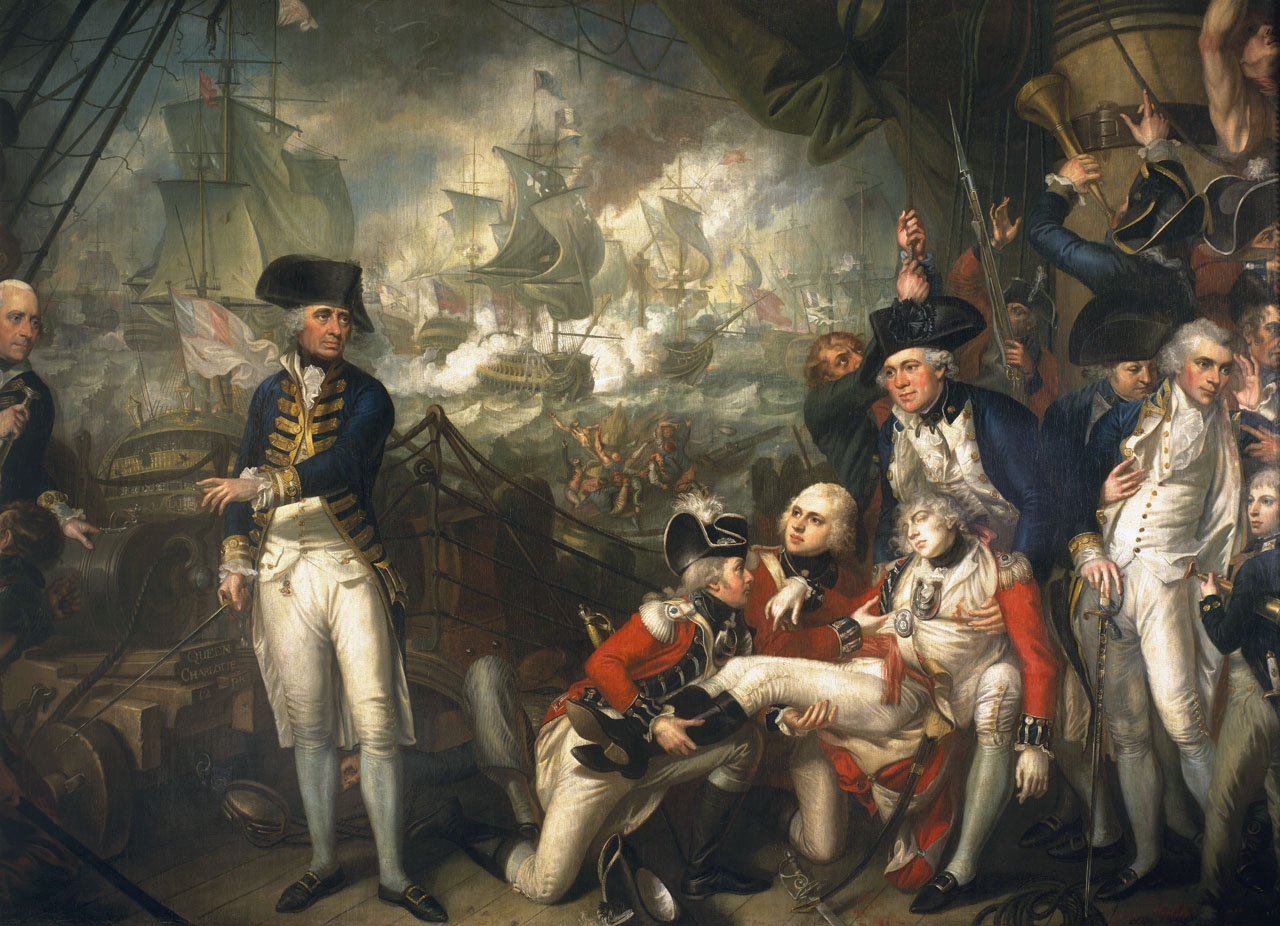
- Artist: Mather Brown
- Year: c. 1794
- Type: Oil on canvas, history painting
- Dimensions: 259 cm × 365.7 cm (102 in × 144.0 in)
- Location: National Maritime Museum; London

Lord Howe on the Deck of the Queen Charlotte is an oil on canvas history painting by the British-American artist Mather Brown, from c. 1794.

== History and description ==
It depicts a scene during the Glorious First of June, a naval battle that took place on 1 June 1794 during the French Revolutionary Wars. Fought in the Atlantic Ocean several hundred miles west of France, it ended in a victory for the Royal Navy fleet commanded by Admiral Richard Howe.

Mather a Boston-born painter who settled and worked in London, portrays a scene aboard Howe's flagship HMS Queen Charlotte. Howe stands second from left in naval uniform (although he in reality he wore a civilian coat during the battle) with a drawn sword. To his left is the captain of the fleet Roger Curtis leaning against a cannon and holding a speaking trumpet. However, the main focus of the composition is to his right where a group of officers are clustered around Lieutenant Nevile of the 2nd (The Queen's Royal) Regiment of Foot, who is dying from after being hit by a French cannon shot. The 2nd Regiment of Foot had embarked on the fleet to bolster the number of marines. Nearby is the Queen's Charlotte captain Andrew Snape Douglas who clutches his head where he has been wounded. In the background the battle rages on.

In the wake of the battle Brown travelled down to Portsmouth to sketch the ship and the various officers. It shows a strong influence of the 1771 painting The Death of General Wolfe by Benjamin West, who Brown had been a student of. Once Brown had completed the picture it was shown to George III and Queen Charlotte at Buckingham House and then exhibited at Daniel Orme's Gallery in Old Bond Street in 1795. At some point it was cut down slightly on four sides, leaving several figures truncated. Today the painting is the collection of the National Maritime Museum in Greenwich. Orme produced an aquatint engraving based on Brown's painting, a copy of which is now in the Royal Collection.

== See also ==
- Lord Howe's Action, or the Glorious First of June, a 1795 painting of the battle by Philip James de Loutherbourg

== Bibliography ==
- Neill, Peter & Demisch, Suzanne. On a Painted Ocean: Art of the Seven Seas. NYU Press, 1996.
- Pressly, Wlliam L. The French Revolution as Blasphemy: Johan Zoffany's Paintings of the Massacre at Paris, August 10, 1792. University of California Press, 2023.
- Tracy, Nicholas. Britannia’s Palette: The Arts of Naval Victory. McGill-Queen's Press, 2007.
