= Glorious First of June =

Battle of the Atlantic campaign of 1794

- Part of the Atlantic campaign of May 1794
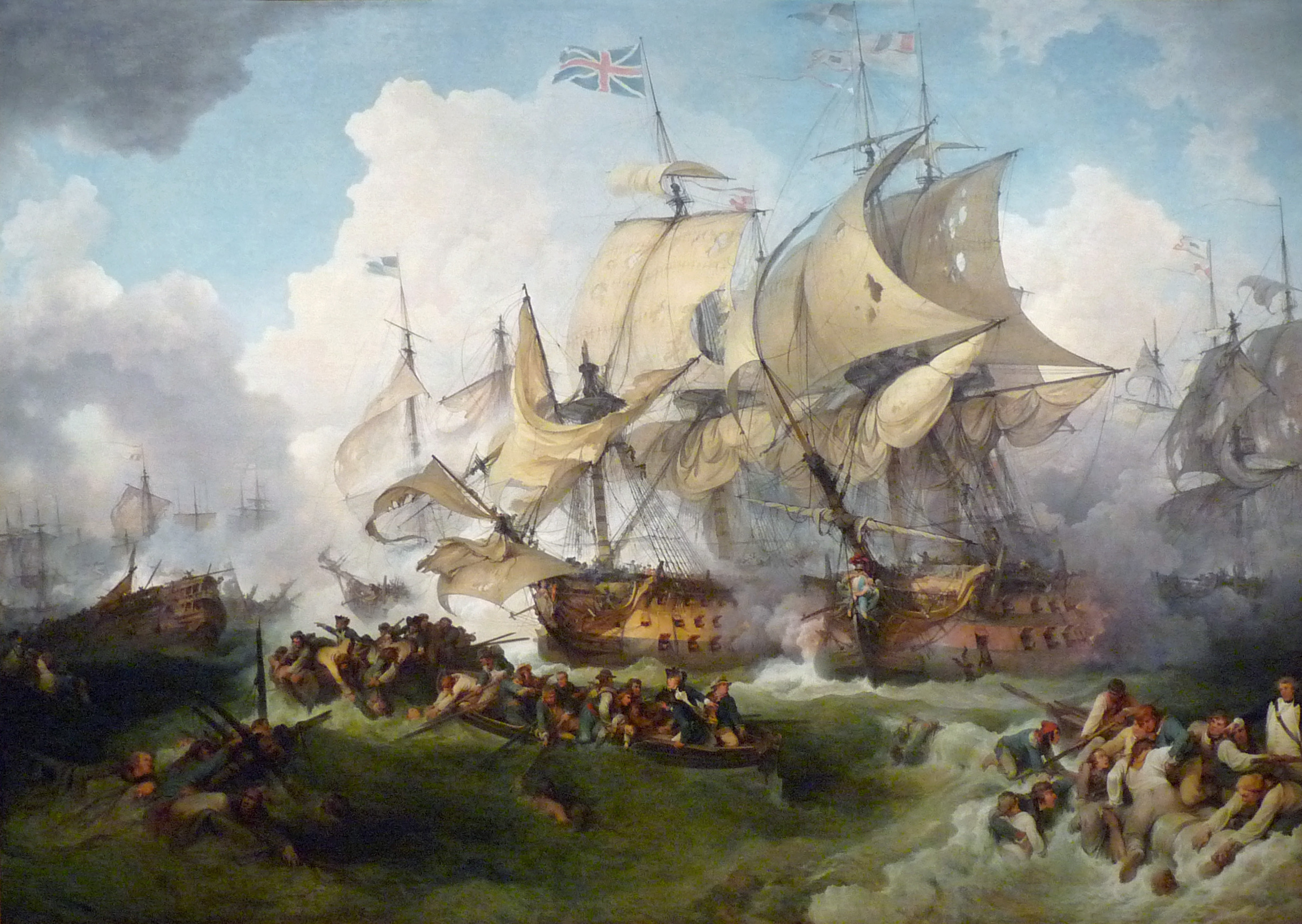
- Lord Howe's Action, or the Glorious First of June; Philip James de Loutherbourg, 1795
Date	1 June 1794
Location	400 nautical miles (740 km) west of Ushant, Atlantic Ocean (Note: Although some sources differ (Smith, p. 82 claims only 50 km from Ushant, which may be a typographical error), the accepted position of the battle is approximately 400 nautical miles (740 km) west of Ushant in the Eastern Atlantic.) 47°24′N 17°27′W
Result	See Aftermath

Belligerents
Great Britain	France

Commanders and leaders
Richard Howe	Villaret de Joyeuse

Strength
25 ships of the line 7 frigates 2 fireships 2 cutters 1 sloop (OOB)	26 ships of the line 5 frigates 2 corvettes (OOB)

Casualties and losses
1,200 killed or wounded	4,000 killed or wounded 3,000 captured 6 ships of the line captured 1 ship of the line sunk

The Glorious First of June, also known as the Third Battle of Ushant and the Fourth Battle of Ushant, (known in France as the Bataille du 13 prairial an 2 or Combat de Prairial) (Note: The battle is generally known in both English and French by its date rather than its geographical location because the closest land feature was hundreds of miles away and bore no relation to the battle. The discrepancy between English and French is a result of the different calendars then in use: for Britain the Gregorian calendar and for France the French Revolutionary calendar. The nearest landmark was at Ushant and there were a number of previous Battles of Ushant during the American Revolutionary War.) was a fleet action fought on 1 June 1794 between the British and French navies during the War of the First Coalition. It was the first and largest fleet action of the French Revolutionary Wars.

The action was the culmination of the Atlantic campaign of May 1794, which had criss-crossed the Bay of Biscay over the previous month and saw both sides capturing numerous merchant ships and small warships along with engaging in two partial, but inconclusive, fleet actions. The British Channel Squadron under Admiral of the Blue Richard Howe, Earl Howe attempted to prevent the passage of a vital French grain convoy from the United States, which was protected by the French Atlantic Squadron commanded by Counter-admiral Louis Thomas Villaret de Joyeuse. The two forces clashed in the Atlantic Ocean, some 400 nautical miles (700 km) west of the French island of Ushant on 1 June 1794.

At the start of the battle, Howe defied naval convention by ordering his ships to turn towards the French and rake and engage their immediate opponent. This unexpected order was not understood by all of his captains, resulting in a piecemeal attack. Nevertheless, the British captured or sunk seven ships of the line before both fleets were so shattered that they disengaged and returned home. Despite being tactically defeated Villaret had bought enough time for the convoy to reach safety unimpeded by Howe's fleet, securing a strategic victory. However, his decision to sail for home left the British free to conduct blockades of French ports for the remainder of the war. In the battle's immediate aftermath, both sides claimed victory and its outcome was seized upon by the press of both nations as a demonstration of the prowess and bravery of their respective navies.

The battle demonstrated a number of the major problems inherent in both navies at the start of the French Revolutionary Wars. Both Howe and Villaret were faced with disobedience from their captains, along with ill-discipline and poor training among their shorthanded crews, and they failed to control their fleets effectively during the height of the combat.

== Background ==
Since early 1792 France had been at war with four of its neighbours on two fronts, battling the Habsburg monarchy and Prussia in the Austrian Netherlands, and the Austrians and Piedmontese in Italy. On 2 January 1793, almost one year into the French Revolutionary War, republican-held forts at Brest in Brittany fired on the British brig HMS Childers. (Note: HMS Childers was under the command of Lieutenant Robert Barlow, who later commanded the frigate HMS Pegasus at the Glorious First of June.) A few weeks later, following the execution of the imprisoned King Louis XVI, diplomatic ties between Britain and France were broken. On 1 February, France declared war on both Britain and the Dutch Republic.

Protected from immediate invasion by the English Channel, Britain prepared for an extensive naval campaign and dispatched troops to the Netherlands for service against the French. Throughout the remainder of 1793, the British and French navies undertook minor operations in Northern waters, the Mediterranean and the West and East Indies, where both nations maintained colonies. The closest the British Channel Squadron had come to an engagement was when it had narrowly missed intercepting the French convoy from the Caribbean, escorted by 15 ships of the line on 2 August. The only major clash was the Siege of Toulon, a confused and bloody affair in which the British force holding the town—alongside Spanish, Sardinian, Austrian and French Royalist troops—had to be evacuated by the Royal Navy to prevent its imminent defeat at the hands of the French Revolutionary Army. The aftermath of this siege was punctuated by recriminations and accusations of cowardice and betrayal among the allies, eventually resulting in Spain switching allegiance with the signing of the Treaty of San Ildefonso two years later. Nevertheless, the siege produced one major success: Sir Sidney Smith, with parties of sailors from the retreating British fleet, accomplished the destruction of substantial French naval stores and shipping in Toulon. More might have been achieved had the Spanish raiding parties that accompanied Smith not been issued with secret orders to stall the destruction of the French fleet.

The situation in Europe remained volatile into 1794. Off northern France, the French Atlantic Squadron had mutinied due to errors in provisions and pay. In consequence, the French Navy officer corps suffered greatly from the effects of the Reign of Terror, with many experienced sailors being executed, imprisoned or dismissed from the service for perceived disloyalty. The shortage of provisions was more than a navy problem though; France itself was starving because the social upheavals of the previous year had combined with a harsh winter to ruin the harvest. By this time at war with all her neighbours, France had nowhere to turn for overland imports of fresh provisions. Eventually a solution to the food crisis was agreed by the National Convention: food produced in France's overseas colonies would be concentrated on board a fleet of merchant ships gathered in Chesapeake Bay, and augmented with food and goods purchased from the United States. During April and May 1794, the merchantmen would convoy the supplies across the Atlantic to Brest, protected by elements of the Atlantic Squadron.

== Fleets ==
The navies of Britain and France in 1794 were at very different stages of development. Although the British fleet was numerically superior, the French ships were larger (even if more lightly built), and carried a heavier weight of shot. The largest French ships were three-decker first rates, carrying 110 or 120 guns, against 100 guns on the largest British vessels.

=== Royal Navy ===
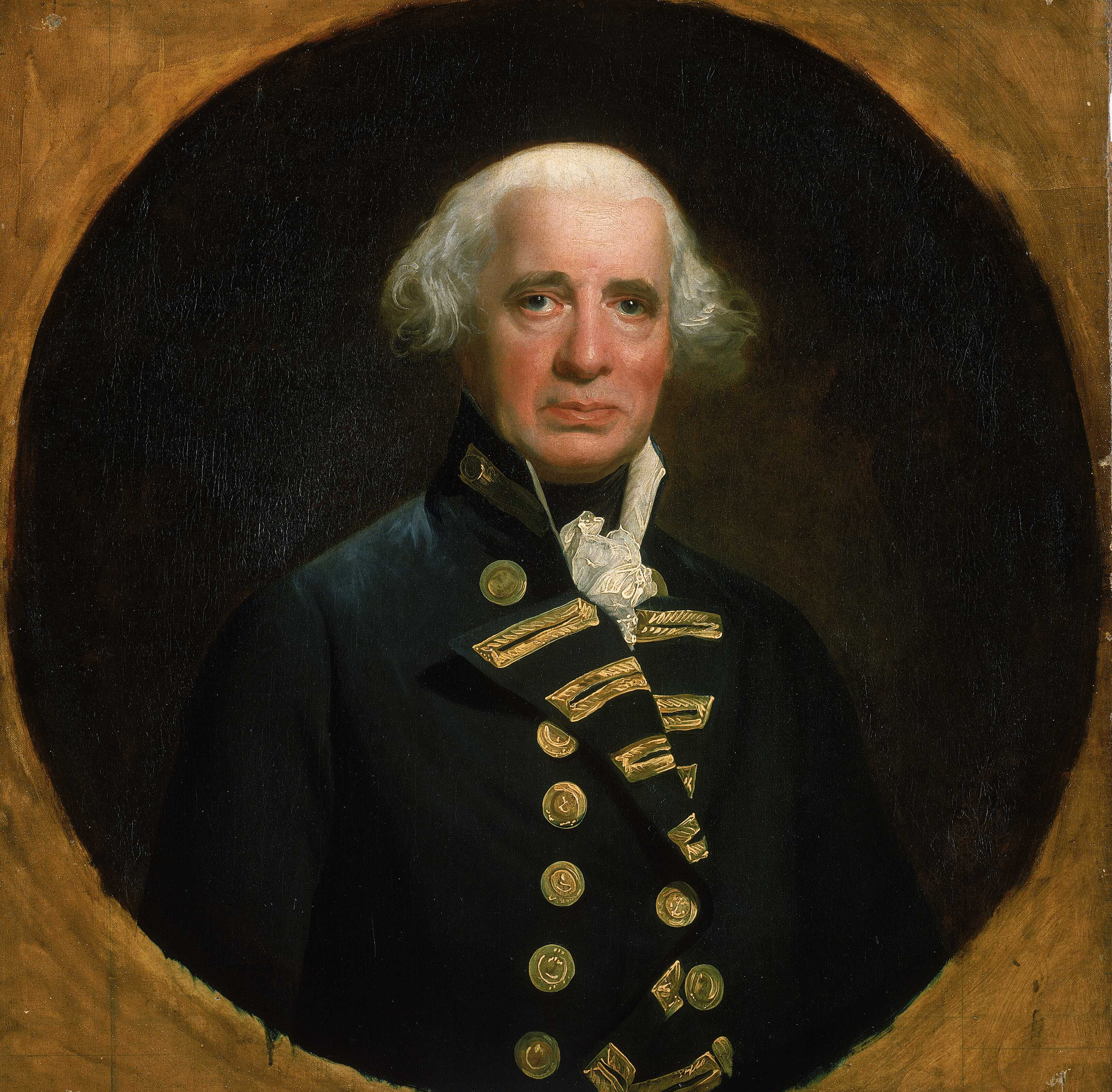
Richard Howe, the British commander at the battle

Since the Nootka Crisis of 1790, the Royal Navy had been at sea in a state of readiness for over three years. Under the direction of First Lord of the Admiralty Charles Middleton, the Navy's dockyards were all fully fitted and prepared for conflict. This was in contrast to the disastrous American War of Independence ten years earlier, when an ill-prepared Royal Navy had taken too long to reach full effectiveness and was consequently unable to effectively support the British war effort in North America, which ended in defeat at the 1781 siege of Yorktown. With British dockyards now readily producing cannon, shot, sails, provisions and other essential equipment, the only remaining problem was that of manning the several hundred ships on the navy list.

Unfortunately for the British, gathering sufficient manpower was difficult and never satisfactorily accomplished throughout the entire war. The shortage of seamen was such that press gangs took thousands of men with no experience on the sea, meaning that training and preparing them for naval life would take quite some time. The lack of marines was even more urgent, and British Army units were drafted into the fleet for service at sea. Troops of the 2nd Foot and 29th Foot served aboard Royal Navy ships during the campaign; their descendant regiments still maintain the battle honour "1 June 1794".

Despite these difficulties, the Channel Squadron was led by Admiral of the Blue Richard Howe, one of the best naval commanders of the age who had served under Edward Hawke at the Battle of Quiberon Bay in 1759. In the spring of 1794, with the French convoy's arrival in European waters imminent, Howe had dispersed his fleet in three groups. George Montagu, in HMS Hector, was sent with six ships of the line and two frigates to guard British convoys to the East Indies, West Indies and Newfoundland as far as Cape Finisterre. Peter Rainier, in HMS Suffolk and commanding six other ships, was to escort the convoys for the rest of their passage. The third force consisted of 26 ships of the line, with several supporting vessels, under Howe's direct command. They were to patrol the Bay of Biscay for the arriving French convoy.

=== French Navy ===
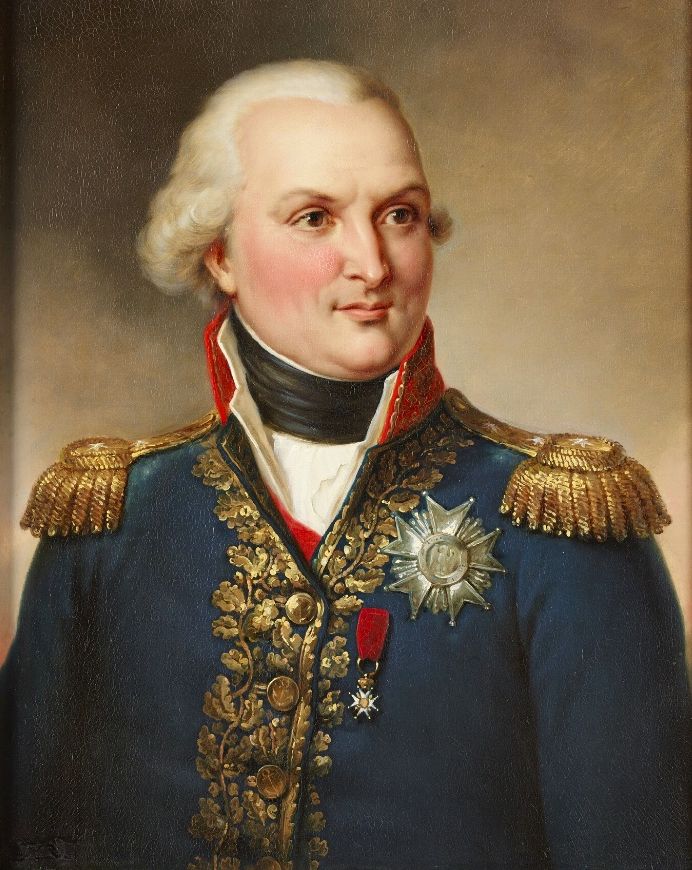
Villaret de Joyeuse, the French commander at the battle

In contrast to their British counterparts, the French Navy was in a state of confusion. Although the quality of the fleet's ships was high, the fleet hierarchy was riven by the same crises that had torn through France since the Revolution five years earlier. Consequently, the high standard of ships and ordnance was not matched by that of the available crews, which were largely untrained and inexperienced. With the Terror resulting in the death or dismissal of many senior French sailors and officers, political appointees and conscripts—many of whom had never been to sea at all, let alone in a fighting vessel—filled the Atlantic Squadron.

The manpower problem was compounded by the supply crisis which was affecting the entire nation, with the fleet going unpaid and largely unfed for months at times. In August 1793, these problems came to a head in the Brest Fleet, when a lack of provisions resulted in a mutiny among the fleet's naval ratings. The crews overruled their officers and brought their ships into harbour in search of food, leaving the French coast undefended. The National Convention responded by instantly executing a swathe of the fleet's senior officers and non-commissioned officers. Hundreds more officers and sailors were imprisoned, banished or dismissed from the navy. The effect of this purge was devastating, seriously degrading the fighting ability of the fleet by removing at a stroke many of its most capable personnel. In their places were promoted junior officers, merchant captains and even civilians who expressed sufficient revolutionary zeal, although few of them knew how to fight or control a battle fleet at sea.

The newly appointed commander of this troubled fleet was Counter-admiral Louis Thomas Villaret de Joyeuse; although formerly in a junior position, he was known to possess a high degree of tactical ability, and had served under Vice-admiral Pierre André de Suffren in the Indian Ocean during the American War of Independence. However, Villaret's attempts to mould his new officer corps into an effective fighting unit were hampered by another new appointee, a deputy of the National Convention named Jean-Bon Saint-André. Saint-André's job was to report directly to the National Convention on the revolutionary ardour of both the fleet and its admiral. He frequently intervened in strategic planning and tactical operations. Shortly after his arrival, Saint-André proposed issuing a decree ordering that any officer deemed to have shown insufficient zeal in defending his ship in action should be put to death on his return to France, although this highly controversial legislation does not appear to have ever been acted upon. Although his interference was a source of frustration for Villaret, Saint-André's dispatches to Paris were published regularly in Le Moniteur Universel, and did much to popularise the Navy in France.

The Atlantic Squadron was even more dispersed than the British in the spring of 1794: Counter-admiral Pierre Jean Van Stabel had been dispatched, with five ships including two of the line, to meet the much-needed French grain convoy off the American eastern seaboard. Counter-admiral Joseph-Marie Nielly had sailed from Rochefort with five ships of the line and assorted cruising warships to rendezvous with the convoy in the mid-Atlantic. This left Villaret with 25 ships of the line at Brest to meet the threat posed by the British fleet under Lord Howe.

=== Convoy ===
By early spring of 1794, the situation in France was dire. With famine looming after the failure of the harvest and the blockade of French ports and trade, the French government was forced to look overseas for sustenance. Turning to France's colonies in the Americas, and the agricultural bounty of the United States, the National Convention gave orders for the formation of a large convoy of sailing vessels to gather at Hampton Roads in the Chesapeake Bay, where Admiral Vanstabel would wait for them. According to contemporary historian William James this conglomeration of ships was said to be over 350 strong, although he disputes this figure, citing the number as 117 (in addition to the French warships).

The convoy had also been augmented by the United States government, in both cargo and shipping, as repayment for French financial, moral and military support during the American Revolutionary War. In supporting the French Revolution in this way, the American government, urged especially by Ambassador Gouverneur Morris, was fulfilling its ten-year-old debt to France. Friendly relations between the United States and France did not long survive the Jay Treaty which came into effect in 1796; by 1798 the two nations would be engaged in the Quasi War.

== May 1794 ==
Location of the battle in the Atlantic Ocean

The French convoy, escorted by Vanstabel, departed America from Virginia on 2 April, and Howe sailed from Portsmouth on 2 May, taking his entire fleet to both escort British convoys to the Western Approaches and intercept the French. Checking that Villaret was still in Brest, Howe spent two weeks searching the Bay of Biscay for the grain convoy, returning to Brest on 18 May to discover that Villaret had sailed the previous day. (Note: It has been suggested by historian Peter Padfield that allowing Villaret to escape Brest was part of a deliberate strategy on Howe's part. If Howe could draw Villaret into the open ocean, he could rely on superior training and tactics to destroy the French fleet in battle. If successful, this would eliminate the threat from the French Atlantic Fleet for years to come.) Returning to sea in search of his opponent, Howe pursued Villaret deep into the Atlantic. Also at sea during this period were the squadrons of Nielly (French) and Montagu (British), both of whom had met with some success; Nielly had captured a number of British merchant ships and Montagu had taken several back. Nielly was the first to encounter the grain convoy, deep in the Atlantic in the second week of May. He took it under escort as it moved closer to Europe, while Montagu was searching fruitlessly to the south.

Despite Howe's pursuit, the main French sortie found initial success, running into a Dutch convoy and taking 20 ships from it on Villaret's first day at sea. For the next week Howe continued to follow the French, seizing and burning a trail of French-held Dutch ships and enemy corvettes. On 25 May Howe spotted a straggler from Villaret's fleet and gave chase; Audacieux led Howe straight to his opponent's location. Having finally found Villaret, on 28 May Howe attacked, using a flying squadron of his fastest ships to cut off its rearmost vessel Révolutionnaire. This first rate was at various times engaged with six British ships and took heavy damage, possibly striking her colours late in the action. As darkness fell the British and French fleets separated, leaving Révolutionnaire and her final enemy, HMS Audacious, still locked in combat behind them. These two ships parted company during the night and eventually returned to their respective home ports. By this stage Villaret knew through his patrolling frigates that the grain convoy was close, and deliberately took his fleet to the west, hoping to decoy Howe away from the vital convoy.

Taking the bait, the following day Howe attacked again, but his attempt to split the French fleet in half was unsuccessful when his lead ship, HMS Caesar, failed to follow orders. Much damage was done to both fleets but the action was inconclusive, and the two forces again separated without having settled the issue. Howe had however gained an important advantage during the engagement by seizing the weather gage, enabling him to further attack Villaret at a time of his choosing. (Note: The weather gage was a vital advantage in sailing warfare because the ships required wind of the correct volume and direction to conduct offensive operations. When the wind was in the wrong direction, a captain could tack to compensate, but possessing the weather gage meant that a ship could use the wind to attack its opponent directly, without the need for complicated manoeuvre.) Three French ships were sent back to port with damage, but these losses were offset by reinforcements gained the following day with the arrival of Nielly's detached squadron.Battle was postponed during the next two days because of thick fog, but when the haze lifted on 1 June 1794, the battle lines were only 6 miles (10 km) apart and Howe was prepared to force a decisive action.

== First of June ==
The British and French fleets on the morning of 1 June

Although Howe was in a favourable position, Villaret had not been idle during the night. He had attempted, with near success, to distance his ships from the British fleet; when dawn broke at 05:00 he was within a few hours of gaining enough wind to escape over the horizon. Allowing his men to breakfast, Howe took full advantage of his position on the weather gage to close with Villaret, and by 08:12 the British fleet was just four miles (6 km) from the enemy. By this time, Howe's formation was deployed in an organised line parallel to the French, with frigates acting as repeaters for the admiral's commands.The French were likewise in line ahead and the two lines began exchanging long-range gunfire at 09:24, whereupon Howe unleashed his innovative battleplan.

It was normal in fleet actions of the 18th century for the two lines of battle to pass one another sedately, exchanging fire at long ranges and then wearing away, often without either side losing a ship or taking an enemy. In contrast, Howe was counting on the professionalism of his captains and crews combined with the advantage of the weather gage to attack the French directly, driving through their line. However, this time he did not plan to manoeuvre in the way he had during the two previous encounters, each ship following in the wake of that in front to create a new line arrowing through his opponent's force (as Rodney had done at the Battle of the Saintes 12 years earlier). Instead, Howe ordered each of his ships to turn individually towards the French line, intending to breach it at every point and rake the French ships at both bow and stern. The British captains would then pull up on the leeward side of their opposite numbers, cutting them off from their retreat downwind, and engage them directly, hopefully forcing each to surrender and consequently destroying the French Atlantic Fleet.

== British break the line ==
Within minutes of issuing the signal and turning his flagship HMS Queen Charlotte, Howe's plan began to falter. Many of the British captains had either misunderstood or ignored the signal and were hanging back in the original line. Other ships were still struggling with damage from Howe's earlier engagements and could not get into action fast enough. The result was a ragged formation tipped by Queen Charlotte that headed unevenly for Villaret's fleet. The French responded by firing on the British ships as they approached, but the lack of training and coordination in the French fleet was obvious; many ships which did obey Howe's order and attacked the French directly arrived in action without significant damage.

=== Van squadron ===
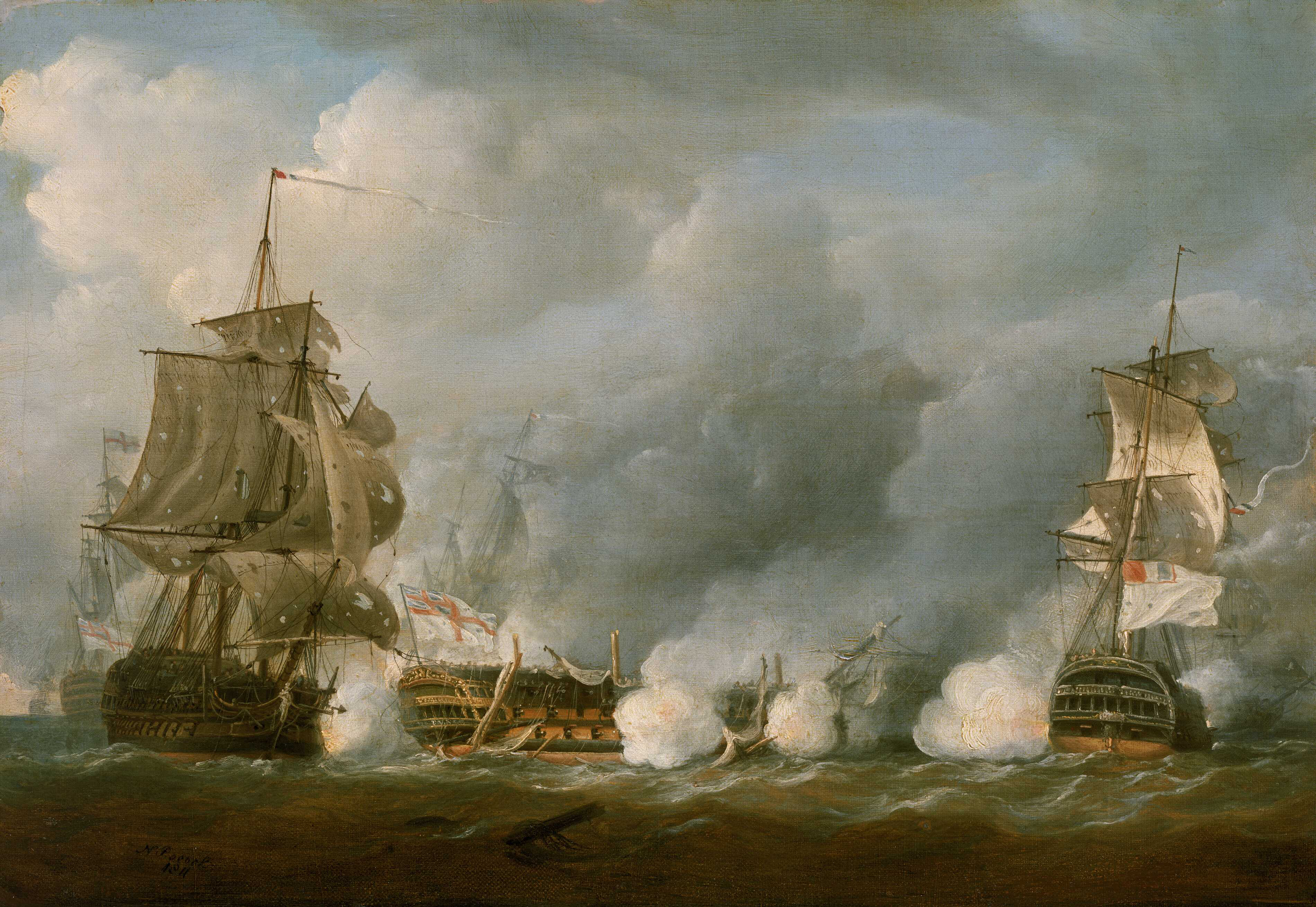
1811 painting of HMS Defence (centre) at the battle by Nicholas Pocock (Note: Pocock was present at the battle as a passenger aboard the frigate HMS Pegasus.)

Although Queen Charlotte pressed on all sail, she was not the first through the enemy line. That distinction belonged to a ship of the van squadron under Vice-Admiral of the Blue Thomas Graves: HMS Defence under Captain James Gambier, a notoriously dour officer nicknamed "Dismal Jimmy" by his contemporaries. Defence, the seventh ship of the British line, successfully cut the French line between its sixth and seventh ships; Mucius and Tourville. Raking both opponents, Defence soon found herself in difficulty due to the failure of those ships behind her to properly follow up. This left her vulnerable to Mucius, Tourville and the ships following them, with which she began a furious fusillade. However, Defence was not the only ship of the van to break the French line; minutes later George Cranfield Berkeley in HMS Marlborough executed Howe's manoeuvre perfectly, raking and then entangling his ship with Impétueux.

In front of Marlborough the rest of the van had mixed success. HMS Bellerophon and HMS Leviathan were both still suffering the effects of their exertions earlier in the week and did not breach the enemy line. Instead they pulled along the near side of Éole and America respectively and brought them to close gunnery duels. Rear-Admiral Thomas Pasley of Bellerophon was an early casualty, losing a leg in the opening exchanges. HMS Royal Sovereign, Graves' flagship, was less successful due to a miscalculation of distance that resulted in her pulling up too far from the French line and coming under heavy fire from her opponent Terrible. In the time it took to engage Terrible more closely, Royal Sovereign suffered heavy damage and Graves was badly wounded.

More disturbing to Lord Howe were the actions of HMS Russell and HMS Caesar. Russell's captain John Willett Payne was criticised at the time for failing to get to grips with the enemy more closely and allowing her opponent Téméraire to badly damage her rigging in the early stages, although later commentators blamed damage received on 29 May for her poor start to the action. There were no such excuses, however, for Captain Anthony Molloy of Caesar, who totally failed in his duty to engage the enemy. Molloy completely ignored Howe's signal and continued ahead as if the British battleline was following him rather than engaging the French fleet directly. Caesar did participate in a desultory exchange of fire with the leading French ship Trajan but her fire had little effect, while Trajan inflicted much damage to Caesar's rigging and was subsequently able to attack Bellerophon as well, roaming unchecked through the melee developing at the head of the line.

=== Centre ===
The centre of the two fleets was divided by two separate squadrons of the British line: the forward division under admirals Benjamin Caldwell and George Bowyer and the rear under Lord Howe. While Howe in Queen Charlotte was engaging the French closely, his subordinates in the forward division were less active. Instead of moving in on their opposite numbers directly, the forward division sedately closed with the French in line ahead formation, engaging in a long distance duel which did not prevent their opponents from harassing the embattled Defence just ahead of them. Of all the ships in this squadron only HMS Invincible, under Thomas Pakenham, ranged close to the French lines. Invincible was badly damaged by her lone charge but managed to engage the larger Juste. Barfleur under Bowyer did later enter the action, but Bowyer was not present, having lost a leg in the opening exchanges.

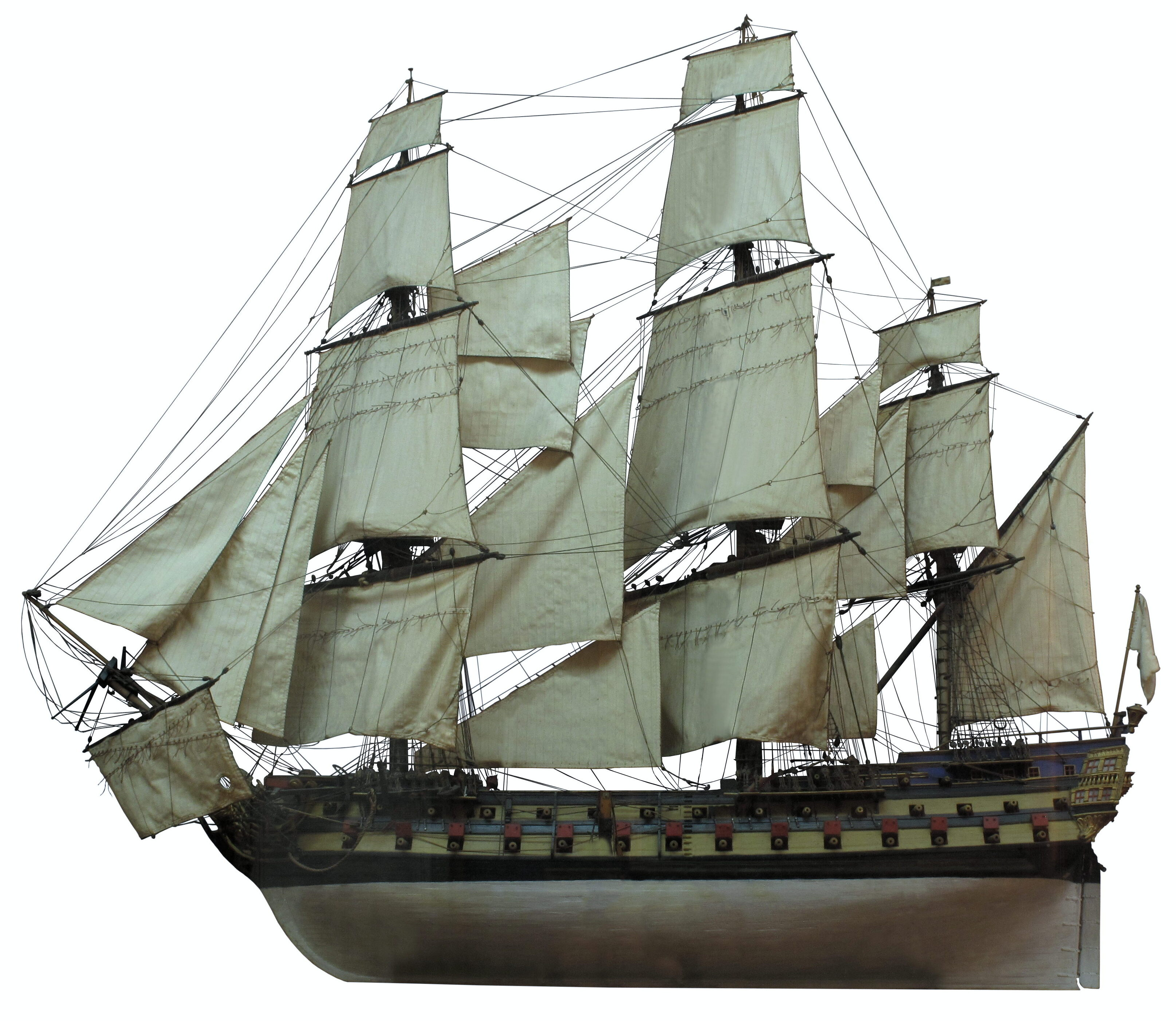
Ship model of Vengeur du Peuple

Howe and Queen Charlotte led the fleet by example, sailing directly at the French flagship Montagne. Passing between Montagne and the next in line Vengeur du Peuple, Queen Charlotte raked both and hauled up close to Montagne to engage in a close-range artillery battle. As she did so, Queen Charlotte also became briefly entangled with Jacobin, and exchanged fire with her too, causing serious damage to both French ships.

To the right of Queen Charlotte, HMS Brunswick had initially struggled to join the action. Labouring behind the flagship, Brunswick's commander Captain John Harvey received a rebuke from Howe for the delay. Spurred by this signal, Harvey pushed his ship forward and almost outstripped Queen Charlotte, blocking her view of the eastern half of the French fleet for a time and taking severe damage from French fire as she did so. Harvey hoped to run aboard Jacobin and support his admiral directly, but was not fast enough to reach her and so attempted to cut between Achille and Vengeur du Peuple. This manoeuvre failed when Brunswick's anchors became entangled in Vengeur's rigging. Brunswick's master asked if Vengeur should be cut loose, to which Harvey replied "No; we have got her and we will keep her". The two ships swung so close to each other that Brunswick's crew could not open their gunports and had to fire through the closed lids, the ships battering each other from a distance of just a few feet.

Behind this combat, other ships of the centre division struck the French line, HMS Valiant under Thomas Pringle passing close to Patriote which pulled away, her crew suffering from contagion and unable to take their ship into battle. Valiant instead turned her attention on Achille, which had already been raked by Queen Charlotte and Brunswick, and badly damaged her before pressing on sail to join the embattled van division. HMS Orion under John Thomas Duckworth and HMS Queen under Admiral Alan Gardner both attacked the same ship, Queen suffering severely from the earlier actions in which her masts were badly damaged and her captain John Hutt mortally wounded. Both ships bore down on the French Northumberland, which was soon dismasted and left attempting to escape on only the stump of a mast. Queen was too slow to engage Northumberland as closely as Orion, and soon fell in with Jemmapes, both ships battering each other severely.

=== Rear ===
Of the British rear ships, only two made a determined effort to break the French line. Admiral Hood's flagship HMS Royal George pierced it between Républicain and Sans Pareil, engaging both closely, while HMS Glory came through the line behind Sans Pareil and threw herself into the melee as well. The rest of the British and French rearguard did not participate in this close combat; HMS Montagu fought a long range gunnery duel with Neptune which damaged neither ship severely, although the British captain James Montagu was killed in the opening exchanges, command devolving to Lieutenant Ross Donnelly. Next in line, HMS Ramillies ignored her opponent completely and sailed west, Captain Henry Harvey seeking Brunswick, his brother's ship, in the confused action around Queen Charlotte.

Three other British ships failed to respond to the signal from Howe, including HMS Alfred which engaged the French line at extreme range without noticeable effect, and Captain Charles Cotton in HMS Majestic who likewise did little until the action was decided, at which point he took the surrender of several already shattered French ships. Finally HMS Thunderer under Albemarle Bertie took no part in the initial action at all, standing well away from the British line and failing to engage the enemy despite the signal for close engagement hanging limply from her mainmast. The French rear ships were no less idle, with Entreprenant and Pelletier firing at any British ships in range but refusing to close or participate in the melees on either side. The French rear ship Scipion did not attempt to join the action either, but could not avoid becoming embroiled in the group around Royal George and Républicain and suffered severe damage.

== Melee ==
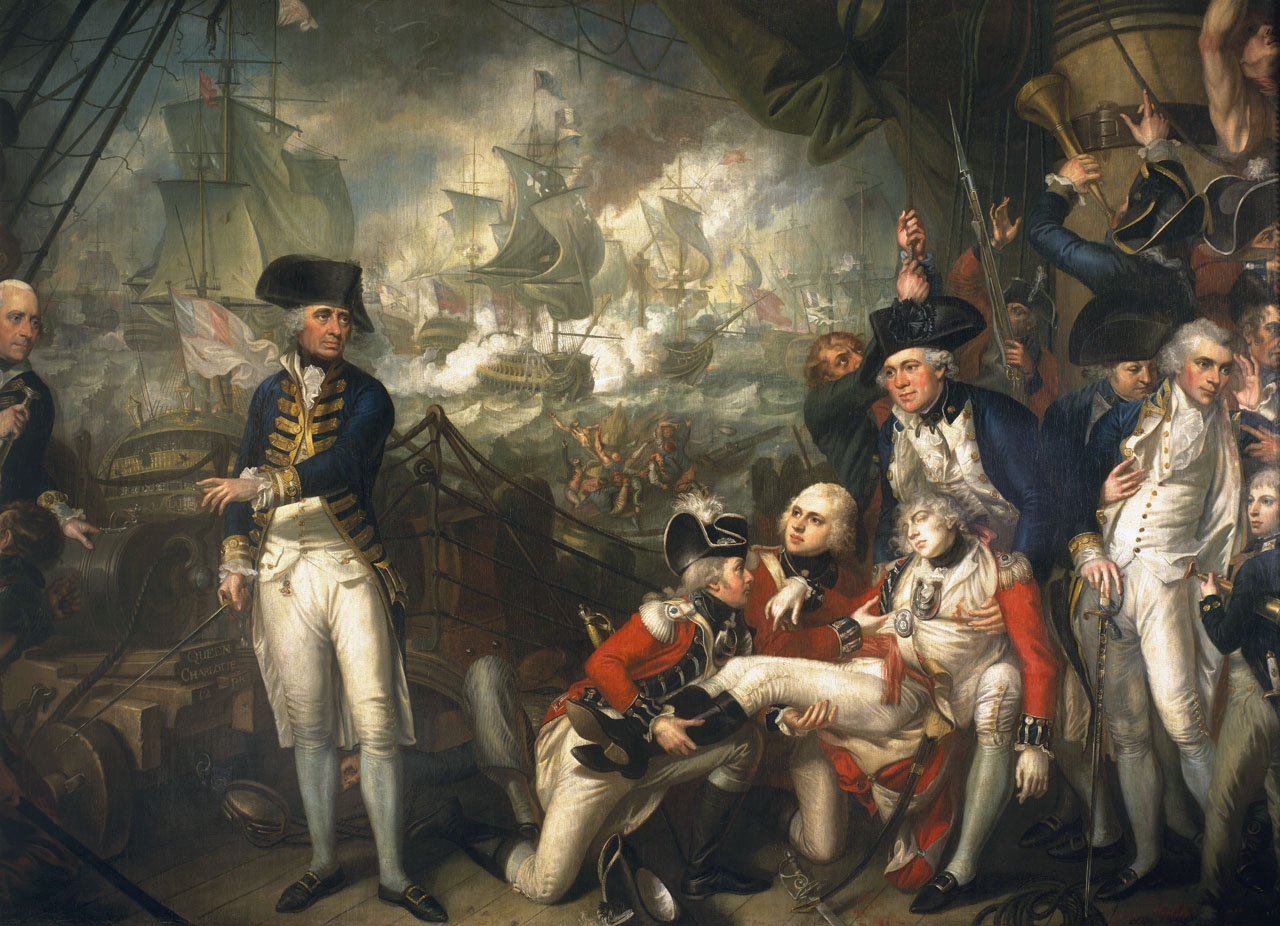
Lord Howe on the Deck of the Queen Charlotte (Mather Brown, 1794)

Within an hour of their opening volleys the British and French lines were hopelessly confused, with three separate engagements being fought within sight of one another. In the van, Caesar had finally attempted to join the fight, only to have a vital spar shot away by Trajan which caused her to slip down the two embattled fleets without contributing significantly to the battle. Bellerophon and Leviathan were in the thick of the action, the outnumbered Bellerophon taking serious damage to her rigging. This left her unable to manoeuvre and in danger from her opponents, of which Éole also suffered severely. Captain William Johnstone Hope sought to extract his ship from her perilous position and called up support; the frigate HMS Latona under Captain Edward Thornbrough arrived to provide assistance. Thornbrough brought his small ship between the ships of the French battleline and opened fire on Éole, helping to drive off three ships of the line and then towing Bellerophon to safety. Leviathan, under Lord Hugh Seymour, had been more successful than Bellerophon, her gunnery dismasting America despite receiving fire from Éole and Trajan in passing. Leviathan only left America after a two-hour duel, sailing at 11:50 to join Queen Charlotte in the centre.

Russell had not broken the French line and her opponent Témeraire got the better of her, knocking away a topmast and escaping to windward with Trajan and Éole. Russell then fired on several passing French ships before joining Leviathan in attacking the centre of the French line. Russell's boats also took the surrender of America, her crew boarding the vessel to make her a prize (although later replaced by men from Royal Sovereign) Royal Sovereign lost her opponent as Terrible fell out of the line to windward and joined a growing collection of French ships forming a new line on the far side of the action. Villaret was leading this line in his flagship Montagne, which had escaped from Queen Charlotte, and it was Montagne which Royal Sovereign engaged next, pursuing her close to the new French line accompanied by Valiant, and beginning a long-range action.

Behind Royal Sovereign was Marlborough, inextricably tangled with Impétueux. Badly damaged and on the verge of surrender, Impétueux was briefly reprieved when Mucius appeared through the smoke and collided with both ships. The three entangled ships continued exchanging fire for some time, all suffering heavy casualties with Marlborough and Impétueux losing all three of their masts. This combat continued for several hours. Captain Berkeley of Marlborough had to retire below with serious wounds, and command fell to Lieutenant John Monkton, who signalled for help from the frigates in reserve. Robert Stopford responded in HMS Aquilon, which had the assignment of repeating signals, and towed Marlborough out of the line as Mucius freed herself and made for the regrouped French fleet to the north. Impétueux was in too damaged a state to move at all, and was soon seized by sailors from HMS Russell.

Dismasted, Defence was unable to hold any of her various opponents to a protracted duel, and by 13:00 was threatened by the damaged Républicain moving from the east. Although Républicain later hauled off to join Villaret to the north, Gambier requested support for his ship from the fleet's frigates and was aided by HMS Phaeton under Captain William Bentinck. As Impétueux passed she fired on Phaeton, to which Bentinck responded with several broadsides of his own. Invincible, the only ship of the forward division of the British centre to engage the enemy closely, became embroiled in the confusion surrounding Queen Charlotte. Invincible's guns drove Juste onto the broadside of Queen Charlotte, where she was forced to surrender to Lieutenant Henry Blackwood in a boat from Invincible. Among the other ships of the division there were only minor casualties, although HMS Impregnable lost several yards and was only brought back into line by the quick reactions of two junior officers, Lieutenant Robert Otway and Midshipman Charles Dashwood.

The conflict between Queen Charlotte and Montagne was oddly one-sided, the French flagship failing to make use of her lower-deck guns and consequently suffering extensive damage and casualties. Queen Charlotte in her turn was damaged by fire from nearby ships and was therefore unable to follow when Montagne set her remaining sails and slipped to the north to create a new focal point for the survivors of the French fleet. Queen Charlotte also took fire during the engagement from HMS Gibraltar, under Thomas Mackenzie, which had failed to close with the enemy and instead fired at random into the smoke bank surrounding the flagship. Captain Sir Andrew Snape Douglas was seriously wounded by this fire. Following Montagne's escape, Queen Charlotte engaged Jacobin and Républicain as they passed, and was successful in forcing the surrender of Juste.

Brunswick engaging both Achille and Vengeur du Peuple

To the east of Queen Charlotte, Brunswick and Vengeur du Peuple continued their bitter combat, locked together and firing main broadsides from point blank range. John Harvey was mortally wounded early in this action by langrage fire from Vengeur, but refused to leave Brunswick's main deck, ordering more fire into his opponent. Brunswick also managed to drive Achille off from her far side when the French ship attempted to intervene. Achille, already damaged, was totally dismasted in the exchange and briefly surrendered, although her crew rescinded this when it became clear Brunswick was in no position to take possession. With her colours rehoisted, Achille then made what sail she could in an attempt to join Villaret to the north. It was not until 12:45 that the shattered Vengeur and Brunswick pulled apart, both largely dismasted and very battered. Brunswick was only able to return to the British side of the line after being supported by Ramillies, while Vengeur was unable to move at all. Ramillies took Vengeur's surrender after a brief cannonade but was unable to board her and instead pursued the fleeing Achille, which soon surrendered as well.

To the east, Orion and Queen forced the surrender of both Northumberland and Jemmappes, although Queen was unable to secure Jemmappes and she had to be abandoned later. Queen especially was badly damaged and unable to make the British lines again, wallowing between the newly reformed French fleet and the British battleline along with several other shattered ships. (Note: Manderson served as a lieutenant aboard HMS Queen) Royal George and Glory had between them disabled Scipion and Sans Pareil in a bitter exchange, but were also too badly damaged themselves to take possession. All four ships were among those left drifting in the gap between the fleets.

== French recovery ==
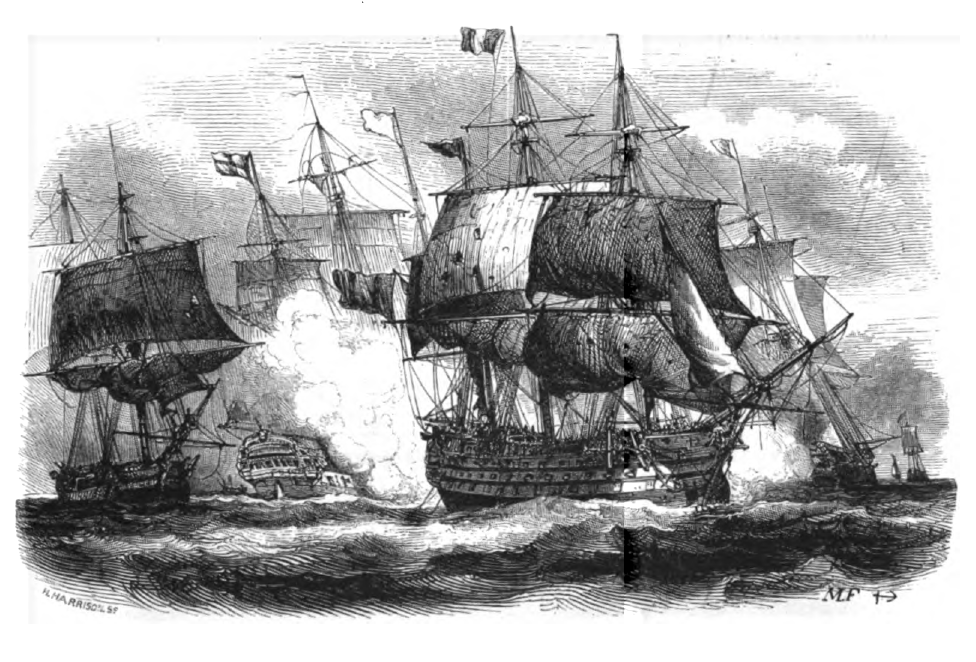
Montagne breaking loose to reform the French fleet

Villaret in Montagne, having successfully broken contact with the British flagship and slipped away to the north, managed to gather 11 ships of the line around him and formed them up in a reconstituted battle squadron. At 11:30, with the main action drawing to a close, he began a recovery manoeuvre intended to lessen the tactical defeat his fleet had suffered. Aiming his new squadron at the battered Queen, Villaret's attack created consternation in the British fleet, which was unprepared for a second engagement. However, discerning Villaret's intention, Howe also pulled his ships together to create a new force. His reformed squadron consisted of Queen Charlotte, Royal Sovereign, Valiant, Leviathan, Barfleur, and Thunderer. Howe deployed this squadron in defence of Queen, and the two short lines engaged one another at a distance before Villaret abandoned his manoeuvre and hauled off to collect several of his own dismasted ships that were endeavouring to escape British pursuit.

Villaret was subsequently joined by the battered Terrible, which sailed straight through the dispersed British fleet to reach the French lines, and he also recovered the dismasted Scipion, Mucius, Jemmappes, and Républicain—all of which lay within reach of the unengaged British ships—before turning eastwards towards France. (Note: Several of these ships had already signified surrender by lowering their flags, only to re-hoist them once out of danger. This was a severe breach of the customs of naval warfare at the time and provoked outrage in the British naval establishment. (Woodman, p. 36)) At this stage of the battle, Howe retired below and the British consolidation was left to his Captain of the Fleet, Sir Roger Curtis. Curtis was subsequently blamed by some in the Navy for not capturing more of the dismasted French ships, and was also accused of dissuading Howe from attempting further pursuit.

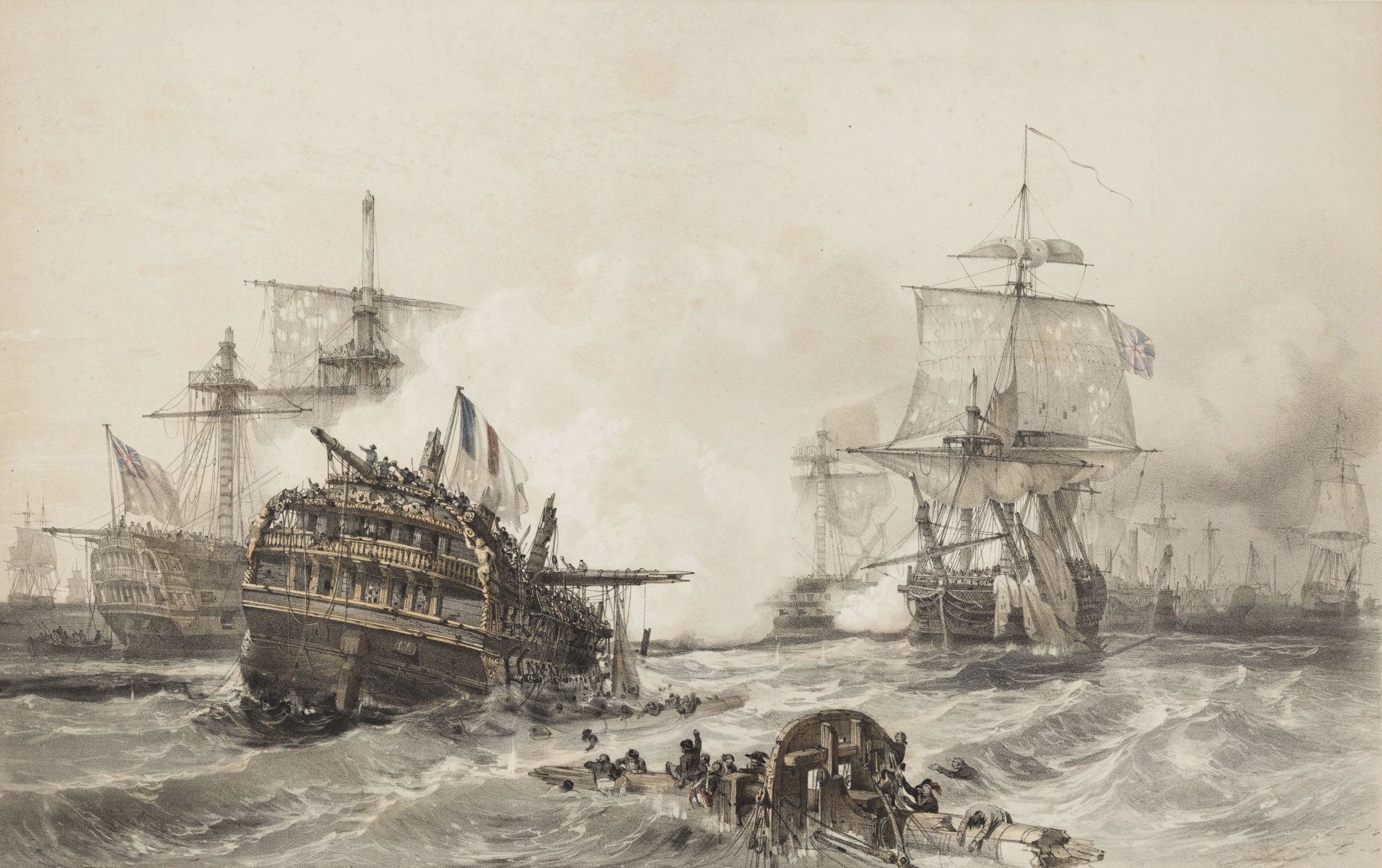
Engraving of Vengeur de Peuple's sinking

In fact, the British fleet was unable to pursue Villaret, having only 11 ships still capable of battle to the French 12, and having numerous dismasted ships and prizes to protect. Retiring and regrouping, the British crews set about making hasty repairs and securing their prizes; seven in total, including the badly damaged Vengeur du Peuple. Vengeur de Peuple had been holed by cannon firing from Brunswick directly through the ship's bottom, and after her surrender no British ship had managed to get men aboard. This left Vengeur de Peuple's few remaining unwounded crew to attempt to salvage what they could—a task made harder when some of her sailors broke into the spirit room and became drunk.

Ultimately the ship's pumps became unmanageable, and Vengeur de Peuple began to sink. Only the timely arrival of boats from the undamaged Alfred and HMS Culloden, as well as the services of the cutter HMS Rattler, saved any of the Vengeur de Peuple's crew from drowning, these ships taking off nearly 500 sailors between them. Lieutenant John Winne of Rattler was especially commended for this hazardous work. By 18:15, Vengeur de Peuple was clearly beyond salvage and only the very worst of the wounded, the dead, and the drunk remained aboard. Several sailors are said to have waved the tricolor from the bow of the ship and cried "Vive la Nation, vive la République!" (Note: The arguments about the final minutes of Vengeur du Peuple have been extensive and bitter. French accounts report a great patriotic gesture, mainly due to the report of the action made to the French National Convention in a celebrated speech by Bertrand Barère Lord Howe however debunks that report entirely, claiming that it never occurred, a position followed by many British sources. Some interesting light is thrown on this story by Thomas Carlyle, who originally included the legend in his history of the French Revolution. When Admiral John Griffiths—who, as a lieutenant on HMS Culloden at the time, had been an eyewitness to the sinking—publicly challenged Carlyle's tale, dismissing both Barère's version of the tale and Carlyle's own poetic license, Carlyle set out to get to the bottom of the story, eventually unearthing the official report of Vengeur de Peuple by Jean François Renaudin. Carlyle concluded that Barère had concocted a "cunningly devised fable", and changed his account of the sinking of Vengeur de Peuple in subsequent editions. William James provides an alternative theory when he suggests that any person who behaved in such a manner on the stricken ship was acting under the influence of alcohol. In his Histoire de la Marine Française, Claude Farrère attributes the sinking to failure of the crew to close damaged lower gunports, claims that a good part of the crew evacuated the ship, and describes the patriotic cries as those of wounded men trapped on the sinking ship with no hope of rescue.) Having escaped to the east, Villaret made what sail his battered fleet could muster to return to France, and dispatched his frigates in search of the convoy. Villaret was also hoping for reinforcements; eight ships of the line, commanded by Admiral Pierre-François Cornic Dumoulin, were patrolling near the Ushant headland. Behind him to the west, the British took the whole night to secure their ships and prizes, not setting out to return to Britain until 05:00 on 2 June.

Casualties in the battle are notoriously hard to calculate exactly. (Note: French losses have been estimated by various commentators and historians with some variation: N. A. M. Rodger gives 4,200 casualties and 3,300 captured; Digby Smith gives 4,270 casualties and 3,254 captured; Padfield lists 3,500 casualties; Gardiner 3,500 casualties and the same number captured. Saint-André gave 3,000 killed and wounded in his official dispatch and James assesses total French killed, wounded, and captured as no fewer than 7,000. British casualty returns are easier to establish due to surviving records although there are discrepancies here too. The official total was 287 killed and 811 wounded during the campaign, while the individual ship totals listed in James do not add up to his eventual total of 1,148, coming in slightly under this figure. Most sources agree however that the total casualty figure is approximately 1,200.) With only one exception (Scipion), records made by the French captains of their losses at the time are incomplete. The only immediately available casualty counts are the sketchy reports of Saint-André and the records made by British officers aboard the captured ships, neither of which can be treated as completely reliable. Most sources accept that French casualties in the campaign numbered approximately 7,000, including around 3,000 captured, but these figures are vague and frequently do not agree with each other on details. (Note: As an example of this, the losses sustained aboard the sinking Vengeur have been variously reported as "very low besides the badly wounded", (James, p. 164) 150 survivors, (Gardiner, p. 33) and "over 600 drowned". (Tracy, p. 106)) British casualties are easier to confirm but here, too, there are some discrepancies; overall British casualties are generally given as around 1,200.

== Convoy arrives ==
With a large portion of his fleet no longer battleworthy, Howe was unable to resume his search for the French convoy in the Bay of Biscay. The Admiralty, though unaware of Howe's specific circumstances, knew a battle had taken place through the arrival of HMS Audacious in Portsmouth, and was preparing a second expedition under George Montagu. Montagu had returned to England after his unsuccessful May cruise, and was refitting in Portsmouth when ordered to sea again. His force of ten ships was intended to both cover Howe's withdrawal from Biscay, and find and attack the French grain convoy. Montagu returned to sea on 3 June, and by 8 June was off Ushant searching for signs of either the French or Howe; unknown to him, neither had yet entered European waters. At 15:30 on 8 June Montagu spotted sails, and soon identified them as the enemy. He had located Cornic's squadron, which was also patrolling for the convoy and the returning fleets. Montagu gave chase and drove Cornic into Bertheaume Bay, where he blockaded the French squadron overnight, hoping to bring them to action the following day. However, on 9 June, Montagu sighted 19 French ships appearing from the west—the remnants of Villaret's fleet. Hastily turning his ships, Montagu sailed south to avoid becoming trapped between two forces which might easily overwhelm him. Villaret and Cornic gave chase for a day before turning east towards the safety of the French ports.

Howe benefited from Montagu's withdrawal, as his own battered fleet passed close to the scene of this stand-off on 10 June, pushing north into the English Channel. With Villaret and Cornic fortuitously pursuing Montagu to the south, Howe was free to pass Ushant without difficulty and arrived off Plymouth on 12 June, joined soon afterwards by Montagu. Villaret had anchored with Cornic in Bertheaume Bay the day before, but Saint-André refused to allow him to enter Brest until the republican attitudes of the town's population had been assessed. On 12 June, the convoy from America finally arrived off France, having lost just one ship in passage during a storm.

== Aftermath ==
Both Britain and France claimed victory in the battle: Britain by virtue of capturing or sinking seven French ships without losing any of her own and remaining in control of the battle site; France because the vital convoy had passed through the Atlantic unharmed and arrived in France without significant loss. The two fleets were showered by their respective nations with both praise and criticism—the latter particularly directed at those captains not felt to have contributed significantly to the fighting.

=== France ===
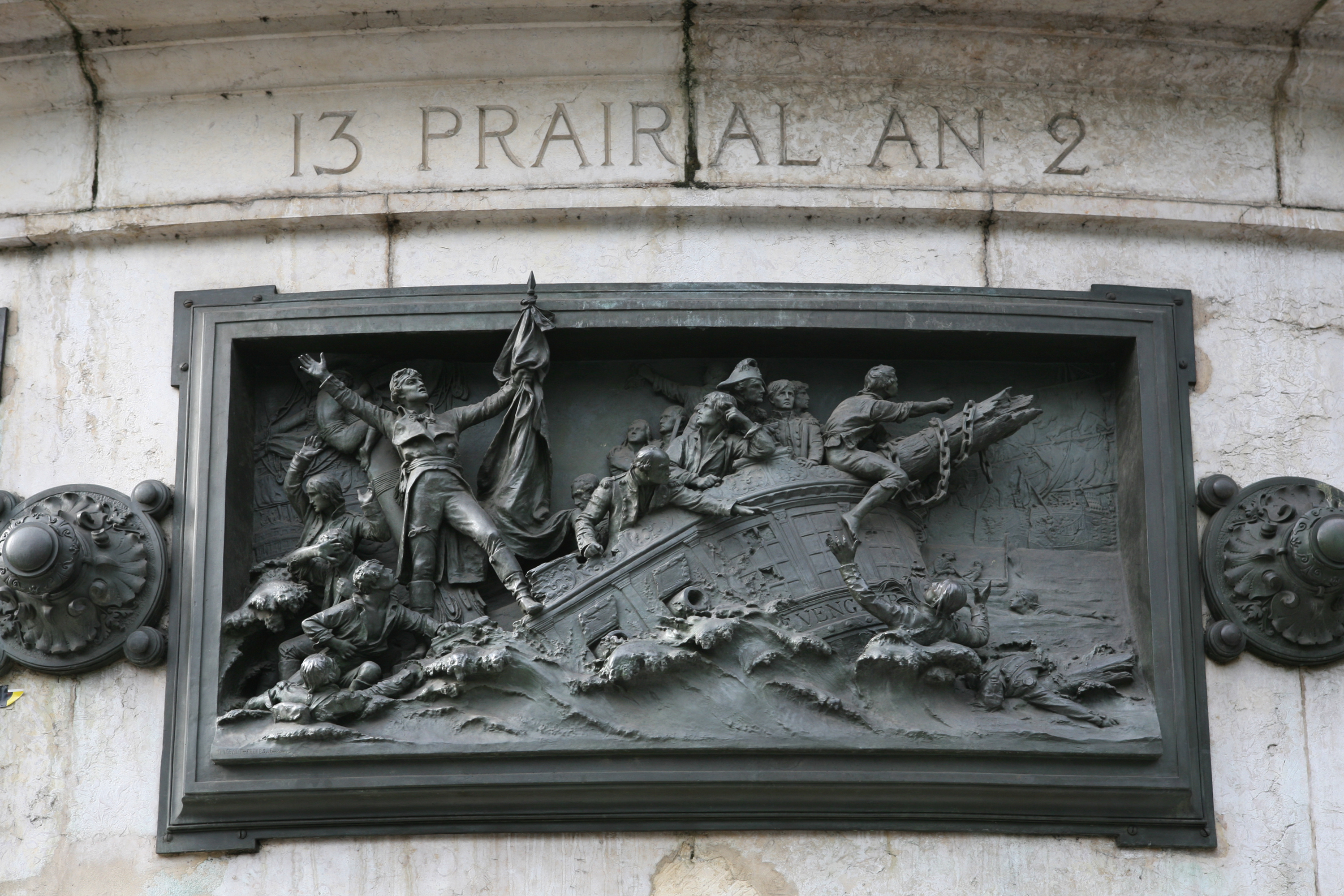
Relief of Vengeur du Peuple's sinking on the Monument à la République (1883)

In France the revolutionary principles of égalité precluded extensive awards, but Villaret was promoted to vice admiral on 27 September 1794 and other minor awards were distributed to the admirals of the fleet. The fleet's officers also took part in a celebratory parade from Brest to Paris, accompanying the recently arrived food supplies. The role of Vengeur du Peuple was mythified by Bertrand Barère, giving birth to an exalted legend. Opinion in France concerning the battle's outcome was divided; while many celebrated Saint-André's exaggerated accounts of victory in Le Moniteur, senior naval officers disagreed. Among the dissenters was the highly experienced but recently dismissed Counter-admiral Yves-Joseph de Kerguelen-Trémarec. Kerguelen was disgusted by Villaret's failure to renew the battle after he had reformed his squadron, and felt that the French fleet could have been successful tactically as well as strategically if only Villaret had made greater efforts to engage the remains of Howe's fleet.

Despite the praise and awards given to Villaret and his officers, the French Navy had suffered its worst losses in a single day since the 1692 Battles of Barfleur and La Hougue, and the revolutionary excesses of the period would ultimately prove disastrous for the navy's capabilities. Poor leadership, conflicting and arbitrary orders and the decimation of experienced sailors in the ranks promoted a defeatist attitude among the French navy's officer corps. The French did not contest British dominance in Northern European waters again, and their raiding operations repeatedly ended in failure at the hands of aggressive British squadrons and the unforgiving Atlantic weather. By 1805, when the last great French fleet to take to the sea was crushed at the Battle of Trafalgar, poor training and low investment in the navy had reduced its efficiency to levels unthinkable 20 years earlier.

=== Britain ===
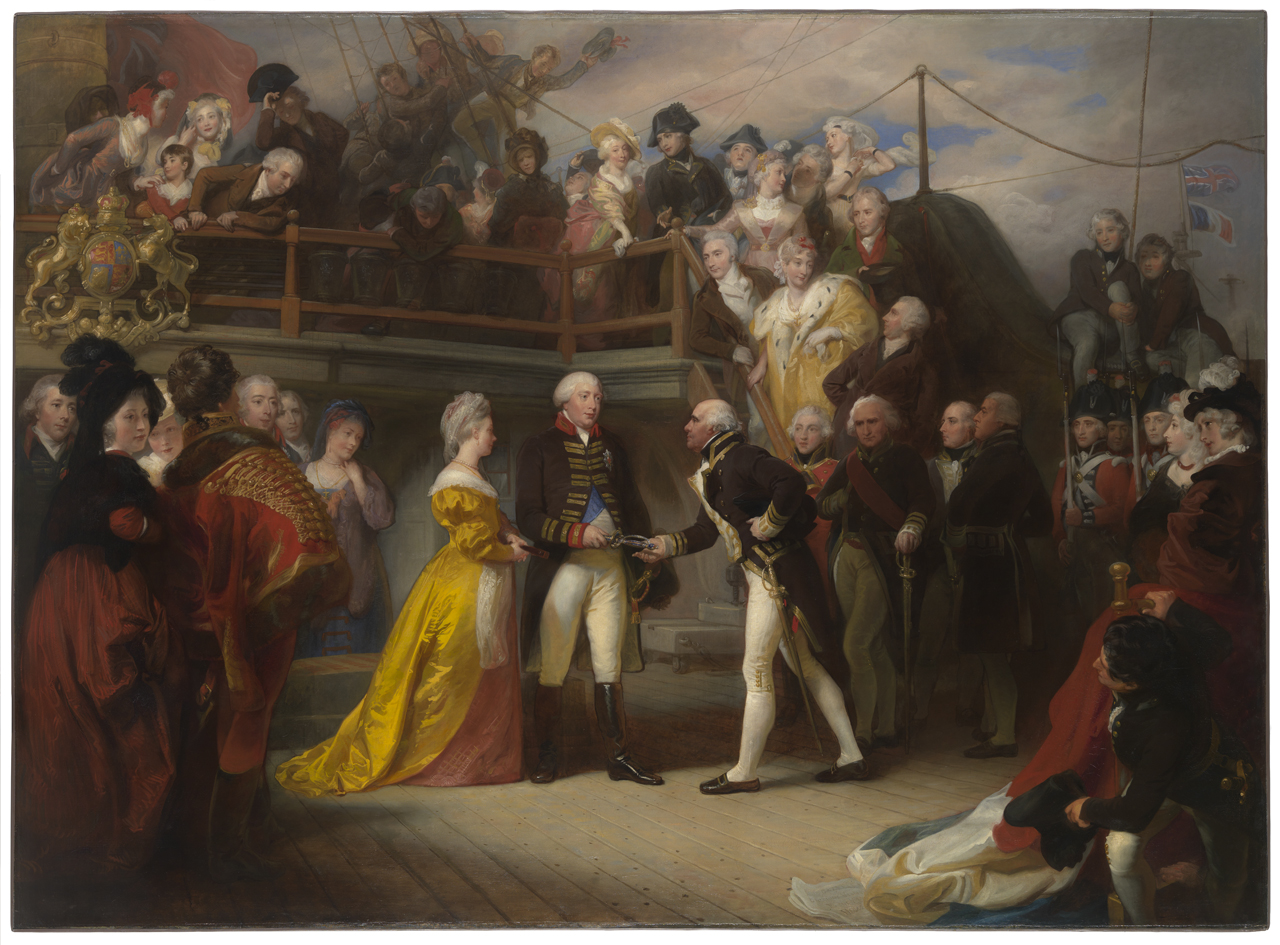
George III and Queen Charlotte meeting Howe onboard Queen Charlotte on 26 June

In Spithead, Howe's fleet was treated to a royal visit by George III and the rest of the British royal household on 26 June. Numerous honours were bestowed on the fleet and its commanders. Admiral Howe, already an earl, refused any further elevation, and one of Howe's political opponents dissuaded King George III from making him a Knight of the Garter. Graves was elevated to the Peerage of Ireland as Baron Graves, while Hood was made Viscount Bridport. (Note: The title Viscount Hood was already in use as the title of his cousin, Admiral Samuel Hood, 1st Viscount Hood.) Rear-Admirals Bowyer, Gardner, Pasley and Curtis (the last-named was promoted from captain on 4 July 1794) were all made baronets, and Bowyer and Pasley also received pensions of £1,000 a year to compensate them for their severe wounds. All first lieutenants were promoted to commander and numerous other officers were promoted in consequence of their actions. The thanks of Parliament were unanimously passed to all who fought at the action and various other gifts and awards were distributed among the fleet. A memorial to John Hutt and John Harvey, both of whom had died of their wounds on 30 June, was raised in Westminster Abbey.

There was, however, a bitter consequence of the awards, rooted in Howe's official dispatch to the Admiralty concerning the battle, which according to some accounts was actually written by Curtis. Howe had appended a list to his report containing the names of officers whom he believed merited special reward for their part in the battle. The list included Graves, Hood, Bowyer, Gardner, Pasley, Seymour, Pakenham, Berkeley, Gambier, John Harvey, Payne, Henry Harvey, Pringle, Duckworth, Elphinstone, Nichols and Hope. Also mentioned were Lieutenants Monkton and Donnelly. The list had omitted a number of officers who had served in the battle, and the justice of their omission was a highly controversial issue in the Navy. Caldwell was the sole British flag officer present not to receive a hereditary honour, although he was promoted to Vice-admiral on 4 July (as were Bowyer and Gardner). After studying the ship's logs and reports of the battle, the Admiralty minted a medal to be awarded to the living captains on the list only (although Captain William Parker of HMS Audacious was awarded one as well). The captains excluded from the list were furious, and the furore from this selective commendation lasted years: in 1795 Caldwell quit the service in anger as a result, while Cuthbert Collingwood, flag captain of Barfleur, refused all awards for future service until the Glorious First of June medal was presented to him as well. He eventually received it after the Battle of Cape St. Vincent in 1797. Over five decades later the battle was among the actions recognised by a clasp attached to the Naval General Service Medal, awarded upon application to all British participants still living in 1847.

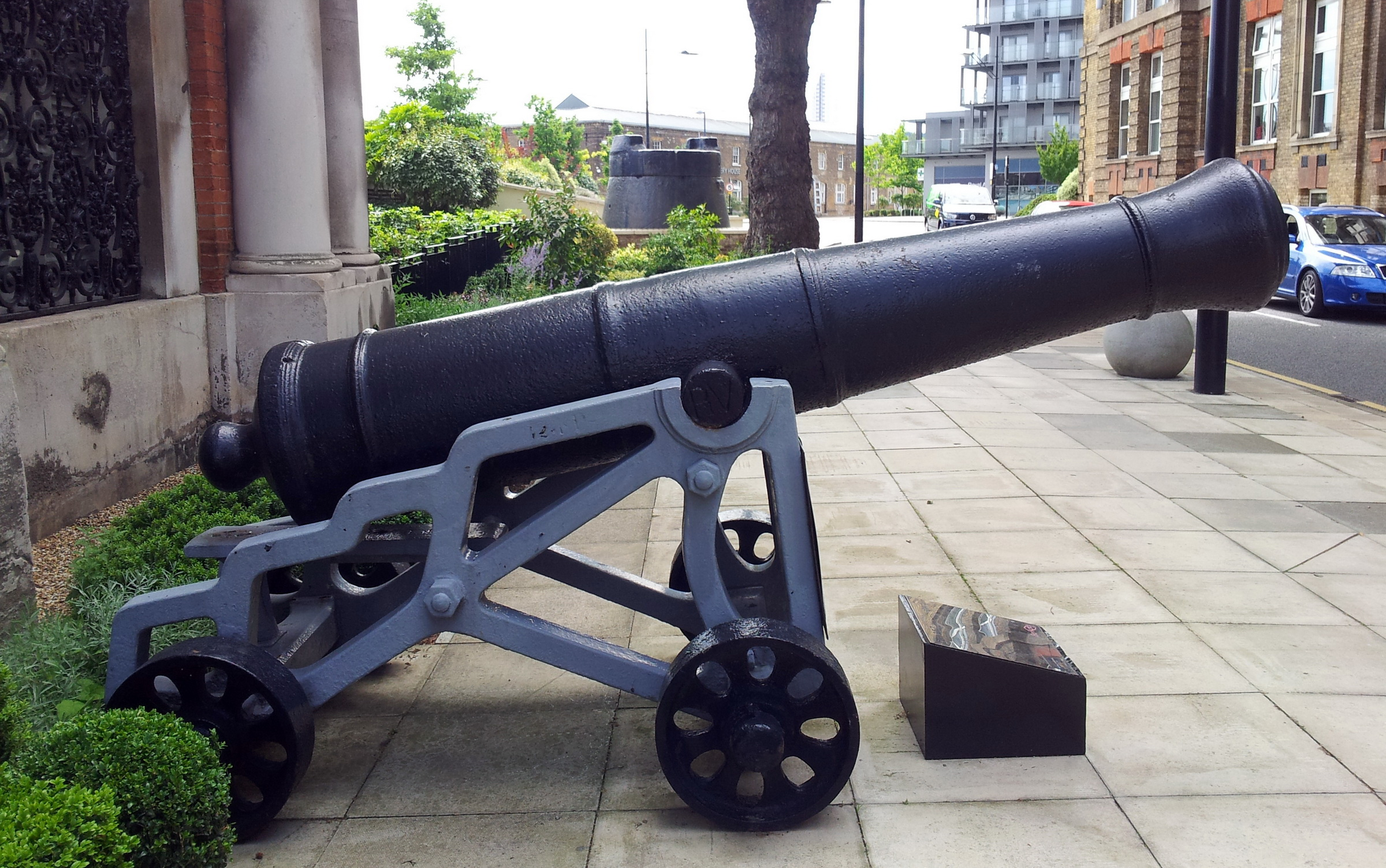
A French cannon captured at the battle on display at Royal Arsenal

Bitterest of all was the whispering campaign directed at Anthony Molloy, captain of HMS Caesar. Molloy was accused of cowardice by fellow officers for his failure to follow Howe's orders on both 29 May and 1 June. Molloy's request for an official court-martial to clear his name failed, and although his personal courage was not called into question, his professional ability was. Molloy was dismissed from his ship. Of the captured ships, several were purchased and enjoyed long careers in the Royal Navy, in particular the two 80-gun ships HMS Sans Pareil, which was decommissioned in 1802 but not broken up until 1842, and HMS Juste, which was a popular command until her decommissioning in 1802 at the Peace of Amiens. Of the four 74-gun prizes, Achille and Northumberland (both 74s built in the late 1770s) were broken up as unserviceable soon after arrival in Britain, while Impétueux was destroyed in a dockyard fire on 24 August 1794 while undergoing repairs. America, the final prize, was taken into the Royal Navy as HMS America but renamed HMS Impetueux in July 1795 and remained in service until 1813. The combined prize money for these ships was £201,096 (equivalent to £28 million in 2024), (Note: United Kingdom Gross Domestic Product deflator figures follow the MeasuringWorth "consistent series" supplied in Thomas, Ryland; Williamson, Samuel H. (2026). "What Was the U.K. GDP Then?". MeasuringWorth.) divided among the ships under Lord Howe's command.

== Bibliography ==
- Brenton, Edward Pelham (1837). The Naval History of Great Britain, From the Year MDCCLXXXIII. to MDCCCXXXVI. Vol. 1. London: H. Colburn.
- Farrère, Claude (1956). "Chapitre IX: Révolution française". Histoire de la Marine française. Paris: Flammarion.
- Gardiner, Robert, ed. (2001a) [1996]. "The Glorious First of June". Fleet Battle and Blockade: The French Revolutionary War, 1793–1797. London: Chatham. ISBN 1-86176-018-3. OCLC 36666951.
- Gardiner, Robert, ed. (2001b) [1996]. Nelson Against Napoleon. London: Caxton Editions. ISBN 1-86176-026-4.
- James, William (2002) [1827]. The Naval History of Great Britain, Volume 1, 1793–1796. London: Conway Maritime Press. ISBN 0-85177-905-0. OCLC 165702223.
- Jane, Fred T. (1997) [1912]. The British Battle-Fleet. London: Conway Maritime Press. ISBN 0-85177-723-6. OCLC 163816462.
- Levot, Prosper (1866). Les gloires maritimes de la France: notices biographiques sur les plus célèbres marins (in French). Bertrand.
- Mostert, Noel (2007). The Line upon a Wind: The Greatest War Fought at Sea Under Sail 1793–1815. Vintage Books. ISBN 978-0-7126-0927-2.
- Padfield, Peter (2000) [1976]. Nelson's War. Ware: Wordsworth Military Library. ISBN 1-84022-225-5. OCLC 43500487.
- Rodger, Nicholas A. M. (2004). The Command of the Ocean. London: Allan Lane. ISBN 0-7139-9411-8. OCLC 43500487.
- Smith, Digby (1998). The Napoleonic Wars Data Book. Greenhill Books. ISBN 1-85367-276-9. OCLC 231766509.
- Tracy, Ed. Nicholas (1998). The Naval Chronicle, Volume 1, 1793–1798. London: Chatham. ISBN 1-86176-091-4. OCLC 60158681.
- Wareham, Tom (2001). The Star Captains, Frigate Command in the Napoleonic Wars. Chatham Publishing. ISBN 1-86176-169-4.
- Warner, Oliver (1961). The Glorious First of June. B.T. Batsford.
- Williams, Henry Smith, ed. (1907). History of France, 1715–1815. The historians' history of the world. Vol. 12. London: The Times.
- Winfield, Rif (2008) [2005]. British Warships in the Age of Sail; 1793–1817. Barnsley: Seaforth Publishing. ISBN 978-1-84415-700-6. OCLC 216617748.
- Woodman, Richard (2001). The Sea Warriors. London: Constable Publishers. ISBN 1-84119-183-3. OCLC 231895733.
- Campagnes, thriomphes, revers, désastres et guerres civiles des Français de 1792 à la paix de 1856, F. Ladimir et E. Moreau. Librairie Populaire des Villes et des Campagnes, 1856 Tome 5, pp. 17–27
