= HMS Queen Charlotte (1790) =

Ship of the line of the Royal Navy

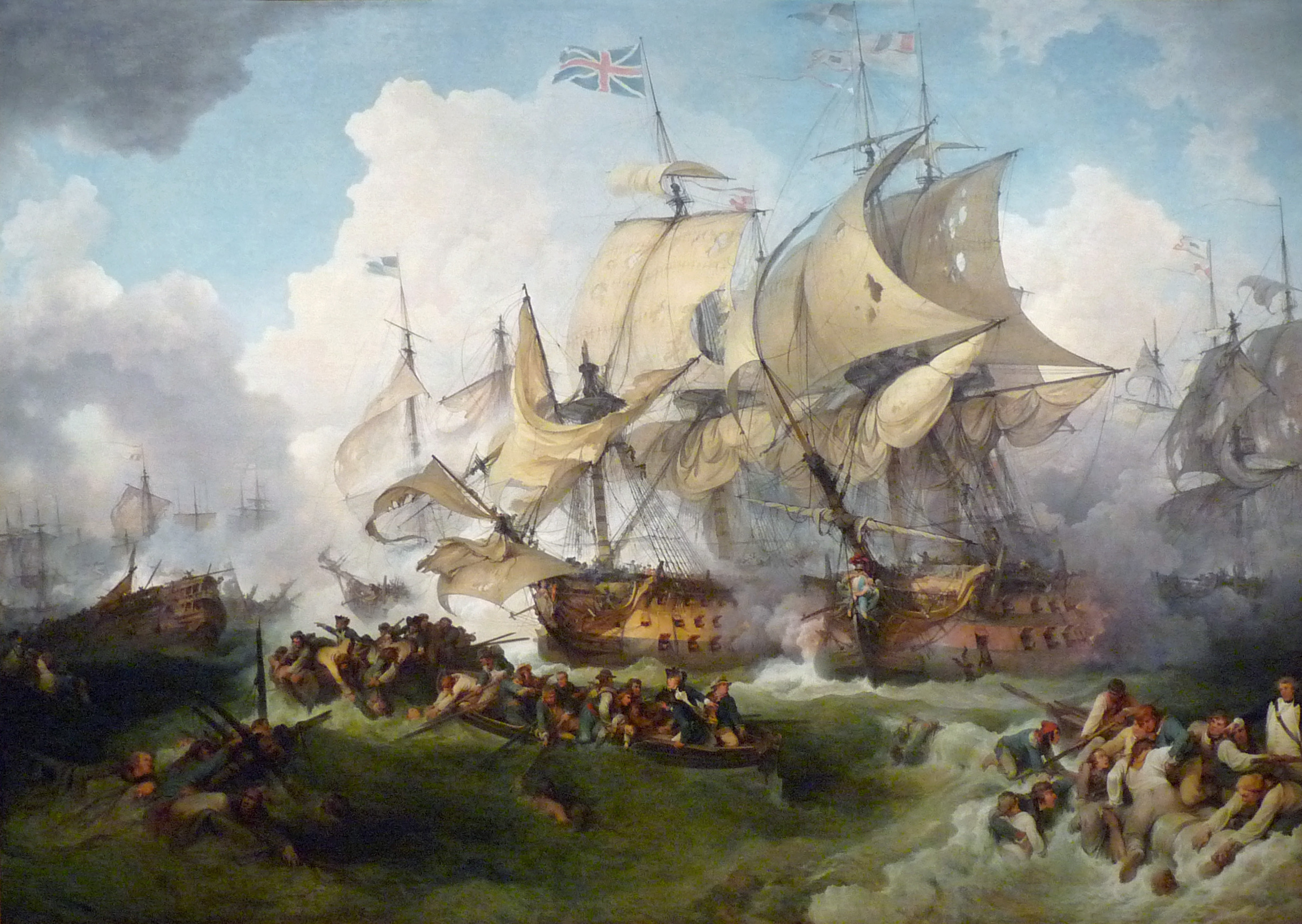
- Queen Charlotte (centre) at the Glorious First of June

History

Great Britain
- Name: HMS Queen Charlotte
- Namesake: Charlotte of Mecklenburg-Strelitz
- Ordered: 12 December 1782
- Builder: Chatham Dockyard
- Laid down: 1 September 1785
- Launched: 15 April 1790
- Completed: 7 July 1790
- Fate: Burned and exploded 17 March 1800

General characteristics
- Class & type: 100-gun first-rate ship of the line
- Tons burthen: 2,286
- Length: 190 ft (58 m) (gundeck)
- Beam: 52 ft 5.5 in (15.989 m)
- Depth of hold: 22 ft 4 in (6.81 m)
- Sail plan: Full-rigged ship
- Armament: 100 guns: Gun deck: 30 × 32-pounder guns; Middle gun deck: 28 × 24-pounder guns; Upper gun deck: 30 × 18-pounder guns; QD: 10 × 12-pounder guns; Fc: 2 × 12-pounder guns

HMS Queen Charlotte was a 100-gun first-rate ship of the line of the Royal Navy, launched on 15 April 1790 at Chatham. She was built to the draught of Royal George designed by Sir Edward Hunt, though with a modified armament.

== History ==
In 1794 Queen Charlotte was the flagship of Admiral Lord Howe at the Battle of the Glorious First of June, and in 1795 under Captain Andrew Snape Douglas she took part in the Battle of Groix.

Queen Charlotte was used as the 'Parliament Ship' (mutineer flagship) during the 1797 Spithead Mutiny. Valentine Joyce, an experienced sailor of the Queen Charlotte's crew, was the most prominent leader of the mutiny. In 1798, some of the Queen Charlotte's crew were court-martialed for involvement in a separate, much smaller mutiny.

=== Fate ===
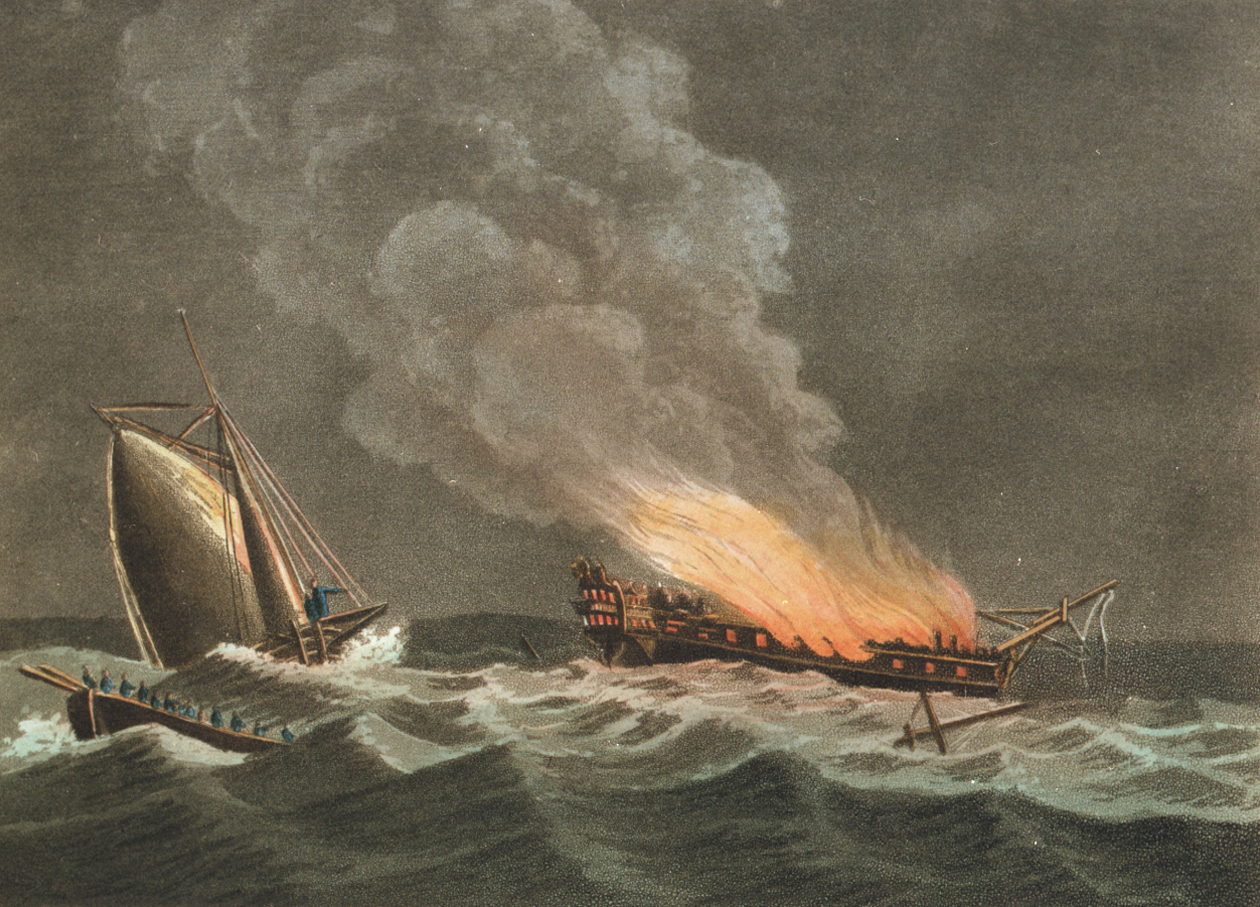
Illustration of Queen Charlotte on fire

At about 6 am on 17 March 1800, whilst operating as the flagship of Vice-Admiral Lord Keith, Queen Charlotte was reconnoitring the island of Capraia, in the Tuscan Archipelago, when she caught fire. Keith was not aboard at the time and observed the disaster from the shore at Leghorn.

The fire was believed to have resulted from someone having accidentally thrown loose hay on a match tub. Two or three American vessels lying at anchor off Leghorn were able to render assistance, losing several men in the effort as the vessel's guns, which were loaded, cooked off in the heat. Captain Andrew Todd wrote several accounts of the disaster that he gave to sailors to give to the Admiralty should they survive. He himself perished with his ship. The crew was unable to extinguish the flames and at about 11 am the ship was abandoned and burnt to the waterline, with the loss of 673 officers and men, although 20 officers and 144 ratings were saved.

== See also ==
- Lord Howe on the Deck of the Queen Charlotte, 1794 painting by Mather Brown
