= Glorious First of June order of battle =

Details of naval fight in the French Revolution

The 'Brunswick' and the 'Vengeur du Peuple' at the Battle of the First of June, 1794, painted by Nicholas Pocock.

The Glorious First of June (known in France as Bataille du 13 prairial an 2 and sometimes called the Third Battle of Ushant) of 1794 was the first and largest naval action between the French and British fleets during the French Revolutionary Wars. The action was fought over 400 miles (640 km) west of Ushant, the most western point on Brittany in France, deep in the Atlantic Ocean. The British fleet under Lord Howe was attempting to defeat a French fleet under Villaret de Joyeuse which was in turn attempting to lure Howe away from a grain convoy destined for France from the United States. The future of the French Revolution depended on this 117-strong convoy, which would save France from famine if it arrived safely. Ultimately, both admirals were successful in their ambitions; Howe defeated Villaret in open battle and sunk or captured seven of his ships. Villaret managed to occupy Howe for long enough and inflict sufficient damage that the convoy escaped unscathed.

Although the campaign was decided by a final major action, May 1794 saw both fleets at sea with several subordinate squadrons, both admirals conducting a complicated series of convoy, commerce raiding and fleet manoeuvre operations. Numerous merchant ships and small warships were taken or destroyed during the month-long campaign by both sides, and there were also two partial fleet engagements as Howe and Villaret made first contact. Both admirals suffered from wilful disobedience by a number of their officers during the battle, and confusion in reading signals, which caused an uneven series of melees to break out rather than the unified battle line Howe had envisaged when planning the action. Nevertheless, both commanders were highly praised on their return to their home ports and the battle was considered a success by both sides, with only a few dissenters amongst the naval establishments of both nations.

Historians have had great trouble determining the exact dispositions of the French fleet, and even more trouble assessing the casualties it suffered in the battle. During The Terror then raging in France, bureaucracy broke down and consequently records were patchy or non-existent. The French Navy was no exception, and few ship's logs have survived, making an accurate order of battle difficult to discern. Those estimates which are available are often the work of British naval officers at the battle, whose accounts frequently differ. Casualties too are almost impossible to establish exactly. French sources published after the battle give a figure of 3,000, but this number does not include those captured, which amounted to 3,500 alone. British estimates aboard captured ships alone are of 1,500 casualties and most historians agree that total French losses during the month-long campaign were around 7,000, as opposed to the British losses estimated at between 1,100 and 1,500.

The British and French fleets on the morning of 1 June 1794

== British fleet ==
=== 28 May ===
Ships of Lord Howe's fleet engaged on 28 May
Ship	Rate	Guns	Commander	Casualties			Notes
Ship	Rate	Guns	Commander	Killed	Wounded	Total	Notes
HMS Russell	Third rate	74	Captain John Willett Payne	0	0	0	
HMS Bellerophon	Third rate	74	Rear-Admiral Thomas Pasley; Captain William Johnstone Hope	0	0	0	Damage to topmasts.
HMS Marlborough	Third rate	74	Captain George Cranfield Berkeley	0	0	0	
HMS Thunderer	Third rate	74	Captain Albemarle Bertie	0	0	0	
HMS Leviathan	Third rate	74	Captain Lord Hugh Seymour	0	0	0	
HMS Audacious	Third rate	74	Captain William Parker	3	19	22	Returned to Britain in a disabled state
Total casualties 3 killed, 19 wounded, 22 total

=== 29 May ===
Ships of Lord Howe's fleet engaged on 29 May
Ship	Rate	Guns	Commander	Casualties			Notes
Ship	Rate	Guns	Commander	Killed	Wounded	Total	Notes
HMS Caesar	Third rate	80	Captain Anthony Molloy	3	19	22	Minor damage to rigging and hull
HMS Queen	Second rate	98	Rear-Admiral Alan Gardner; Captain John Hutt †	23	26	49	Extensive damage to masts, rigging and hull
HMS Royal George	First rate	100	Vice-Admiral Sir Alexander Hood; Captain William Domett	15	23	38	Minor damage to rigging and hull
HMS Invincible	Third rate	74	Captain Thomas Pakenham	10	21	31	Minor damage to topmasts
HMS Royal Sovereign	First rate	100	Vice-Admiral Thomas Graves; Captain Henry Nicholls	8	22	30	
HMS Russell	Third rate	74	Captain John Willett Payne	0	0	0	Minor damage to rigging and hull.
HMS Orion	Third rate	74	Captain John Thomas Duckworth	3	0	3	Minor damage to rigging.
HMS Ramillies	Third rate	74	Captain Henry Harvey	3	0	3	Minor damage to rigging.
HMS Defence	Third rate	74	Captain James Gambier	1	3	4	Minor damage to rigging
HMS Majestic	Third rate	74	Captain Charles Cotton	1	13	14	Minor damage to rigging.
HMS Queen Charlotte	First rate	100	Admiral Lord Howe; Captain Sir Roger Curtis; Captain Sir Andrew Snape Douglas	1	0	1	Minor damage to rigging.
Total casualties 68 killed, 130 wounded, 198 total

=== 1 June ===
Lord Howe's fleet on the Glorious First of June
Ship	Rate	Guns	Commander	Casualties			Notes
Ship	Rate	Guns	Commander	Killed	Wounded	Total	Notes
HMS Caesar	Third rate	80	Captain Anthony Molloy	14	53	67	
HMS Bellerophon	Third rate	74	Rear-Admiral Thomas Pasley; Captain William Johnstone Hope	4	27	31	Extensive damage to masts and rigging.
HMS Leviathan	Third rate	74	Captain Lord Hugh Seymour	11	32	43	
HMS Russell	Third rate	74	Captain John Willett Payne	8	26	34	
HMS Royal Sovereign	First rate	100	Vice-Admiral Thomas Graves; Captain Henry Nicholls	14	44	58	Damage to masts and rigging
HMS Marlborough	Third rate	74	Captain George Cranfield Berkeley	29	80	109	Totally dismasted
HMS Defence	Third rate	74	Captain James Gambier	17	36	53	Totally dismasted.
HMS Impregnable	Second rate	98	Rear-Admiral Benjamin Caldwell; Captain George Blagdon Westcott	7	24	31	Damage to masts and rigging.
HMS Tremendous	Third rate	74	Captain James Pigott	3	8	11	
HMS Barfleur	Second rate	98	Rear-Admiral George Bowyer; Captain Cuthbert Collingwood	9	25	34	
HMS Invincible	Third rate	74	Captain Thomas Pakenham	4	10	14	
HMS Culloden	Third rate	74	Captain Isaac Schomberg	2	5	7	
HMS Gibraltar	Third rate	80	Captain Thomas Mackenzie	2	12	14	
HMS Queen Charlotte	First rate	100	Admiral Lord Howe; Captain Sir Roger Curtis; Captain Sir Andrew Snape Douglas	13	29	42	Extensive damage to masts and rigging.
HMS Brunswick	Third rate	74	Captain John Harvey †; Lieutenant William Edward Cracraft	45	114	159	Lost mizzenmast, extensive damage to remaining masts and rigging.
HMS Valiant	Third rate	74	Captain Thomas Pringle	2	9	11	
HMS Orion	Third rate	74	Captain John Thomas Duckworth	2	24	26	Minor damage to masts and rigging
HMS Queen	Second rate	98	Rear-Admiral Alan Gardner	14	40	54	Lost mainmast, damage to remaining masts and rigging
HMS Ramillies	Third rate	74	Captain Henry Harvey	2	7	9	
HMS Alfred	Third rate	74	Captain John Bazely	0	8	8	
HMS Montagu	Third rate	74	Captain James Montagu †	4	13	17	
HMS Royal George	First rate	100	Vice-Admiral Sir Alexander Hood; Captain William Domett	5	49	54	Lost foremast, damage to remaining masts and rigging.
HMS Majestic	Third rate	74	Captain Charles Cotton	2	5	7	
HMS Glory	Second rate	98	Captain John Elphinstone	13	39	52	Severe damage to masts and rigging
HMS Thunderer	Third rate	74	Captain Albemarle Bertie	0	0	0	
Support ships
HMS Phaeton	Fifth rate	38	Captain William Bentinck	3	5	8	
HMS Latona	Fifth rate	38	Captain Edward Thornbrough	0	0	0	
HMS Niger	Fifth rate	36	Captain Arthur Kaye Legge	0	0	0	
HMS Southampton	Fifth rate	36	Captain Robert Forbes	0	0	0	
HMS Venus	Fifth rate	36	Captain William Brown	0	0	0	
HMS Aquilon	Fifth rate	36	Captain Robert Stopford	0	0	0	
HMS Pegasus	Sixth rate	28	Captain Robert Barlow	0	0	0	
HMS Charon	Hospital ship	-	Captain George Countess	-	-	-	
HMS Comet	Fireship	14	Commander William Bradley	-	-	-	
HMS Incendiary	Fireship	14	Commander John Cooke	-	-	-	
HMS Kingfisher	Sloop	18	Commander Thomas Le Marchant Gosselin	-	-	-	
HMS Rattler	Cutter	16	Lieutenant John Winne	0	0	0	
HMS Ranger	Cutter	16	Lieutenant Charles Cotgrave	0	0	0	
Total casualties 229 killed, 724 wounded, 953 total

=== Attached squadrons ===
Admiral Montagu's squadron
Ship	Rate	Guns	Commander	Casualties			Notes
Ship	Rate	Guns	Commander	Killed	Wounded	Total	Notes
HMS Hector	Third rate	74	Rear-Admiral George Montagu; Captain Lawrence Halstead	-	-	-	
HMS Alexander	Third rate	74	Captain Richard Rodney Bligh	-	-	-	
HMS Ganges	Third rate	74	Captain William Truscott	-	-	-	
HMS Colossus	Third rate	74	Captain Charles Pole	-	-	-	Attached on 4 June.
HMS Bellona	Third rate	74	Captain George Wilson	-	-	-	
HMS Theseus	Third rate	74	Captain Robert Calder	-	-	-	
HMS Arrogant	Third rate	74	Captain Richard Lucas	-	-	-	
HMS Minotaur	Third rate	74	Captain Thomas Louis	-	-	-	Attached on 4 June.
HMS Ruby	Third rate	64	Captain Sir Richard Bickerton	-	-	-	Attached on 4 June.
HMS Pallas	Fifth rate	32	Captain Henry Curzon	-	-	-	
HMS Concorde	Fifth rate	36	Captain Sir Richard Strachan	-	-	-	

Captain Rainier's convoy escort
Ship	Rate	Guns	Commander	Casualties			Notes
Ship	Rate	Guns	Commander	Killed	Wounded	Total	Notes
HMS Suffolk	Third rate	74	Captain Peter Rainier	-	-	-	Ordered to Madras
HMS Sampson	Third rate	64	Captain Robert Montagu	-	-	-	Detached to Saint Helena
HMS Centurion	Fourth rate	50	Captain Samuel Osborne	-	-	-	Ordered to Madras
HMS Resistance	Fifth Rate	44	Captain Edward Pakenham	-	-	-	Ordered to Madras
HMS Argo	Fifth Rate	44	Captain William Clark	-	-	-	Detached to Saint Helena
HMS Orpheus	Fifth Rate	32	Captain Henry Newcome	-	-	-	Ordered to Madras
HMS Swift	Sloop	14	Commander John Dolling	-	-	-	Ordered to Madras
Source: Parkinson, p. 68

== French fleet ==
=== 28 May ===
Ships of Villaret de Joyeuse's fleet engaged on 28 May
Ship	Rate	Guns	Commander	Casualties			Notes
Ship	Rate	Guns	Commander	Killed	Wounded	Total	Notes
Révolutionnaire	First rate	110	Captain Vaudangel			~400	Returned to France in a disabled state
Audacieux	Third rate	74	Captain Pilastre	-	-	-	Returned to France with Révolutionnaire
Although other ships were engaged during the action, their names and details are unknown.

=== 29 May ===
Ships of Villaret de Joyeuse's fleet engaged on 29 May
Ship	Rate	Guns	Commander	Casualties			Notes
Ship	Rate	Guns	Commander	Killed	Wounded	Total	Notes
Montagnard	Third rate	74	Captain Jean-Baptiste-François Bompart	Unknown			Badly damaged, attached to Vanstabel's squadron.
Éole	Third rate	74	Captain Bertrand Keranguen Captain Bruix	Unknown			
Terrible	First rate	110	Captain Pierre-Jacques Longer Captain Bouvet	Unknown			
Tyrannicide	Third rate	74	Captain Alain Joseph Dordelin	Unknown			
Indomptable	Third rate	80	Captain Lamesle; Captain Nielly	Unknown			Returned to France in a disabled state.
Mont Blanc ?	Third rate	74	Captain Thévenard	-	-	-	Returned to France with Indomptable.
Although other ships were engaged during the action, their names and details are unknown.

=== 1 June ===
Vanguard (Counter-admiral François Joseph Bouvet)
Ship	Rate	Guns	Commander	Casualties			Notes
Ship	Rate	Guns	Commander	Killed	Wounded	Total	Notes
Convention	Third rate	74	Captain Joseph Allary	Unknown			
Gasparin	Third rate	74	Captain Tardy	Unknown			
America	Third rate	74	Captain Louis Lhéritier	134	110	244	Totally dismasted. Captured, subsequently HMS Impétueux.
Téméraire	Third rate	74	Captain Morel	Unknown			Attached from Nielly's squadron
Terrible	First rate	110	Counter-admiral François Joseph Bouvet; Captain Pierre-Jacques Longer (Note: Guérin lists captain Le Ray)	Unknown			Lost mainmast and mizzenmast.
Impétueux	Third rate	74	Captain Douville †	100	85	185	Totally dismasted. Captured, subsequently destroyed in a dockyard fire.
Mucius	Third rate	74	Captain Lareguy	Unknown			Totally dismasted.
Éole	Third rate	74	Captain Bertrand Keranguen †	Unknown			
Tourville	Third rate	74	Captain Langlois	Unknown			
Précieuse	Frigate	32		Unknown			
Naïade	Brig-Corvette	16		Unknown			
Ships ordered by position in the line of battle (Guérin, vol. 6, pp. 503–04)

Battle corps (Counter-admiral Louis Thomas Villaret de Joyeuse)
Ship	Rate	Guns	Commander	Casualties			Notes
Ship	Rate	Guns	Commander	Killed	Wounded	Total	Notes
Trajan	Third rate	74	Captain Dumoutier	Unknown			Attached from Nielly's squadron.
Tyrannicide	Third rate	74	Captain Alain Joseph Dordelin	Unknown			Extensive damage to masts and rigging.
Juste	Third rate	80	Captain Blavet	100	145	245	Totally dismasted. Captured, subsequently HMS Juste
Montagne	First rate	120	Counter-admiral Louis Thomas Villaret de Joyeuse; Représentant en mission Jeanbon Saint-André; Flag Captain Bazire †; Captain Vignot			~300	
Jacobin	Third rate	80	Captain Gassin	Unknown			
Achille	Third rate	74	Captain La Villegris	36	60	66	Totally dismasted. Captured, subsequently dismantled.
Northumberland	Third rate	74	Captain Étienne	60	100	160	Totally dismasted. Captured, subsequently dismantled.
Vengeur du Peuple	Third rate	74	Captain Renaudin	~200–600			Captured but sank due to severe damage.
Patriote	Third rate	74	Captain Lacadou	Unknown			Attached from Nielly's squadron.
Proserpine	Frigate	38		Unknown			
Tamise	Frigate	32		Unknown			
Papillon	Corvette	12		Unknown			
Ships ordered by position in the line of battle (Guérin, vol. 6, pp. 503–04)

Rear guard
Ship	Rate	Guns	Commander	Casualties			Notes
Ship	Rate	Guns	Commander	Killed	Wounded	Total	Notes
Entreprenant	Third rate	74	Captain Lefranq	Unknown			
Neptune	Third rate	74	Captain Tiphaine	Unknown			
Jemmapes	Third rate	74	Captain Desmartis Captain Le Roy	Unknown			Totally dismasted.
Trente-et-un-Mai	Third rate	74	Captain Honoré Joseph Antoine Ganteaume	Unknown			Attached to fleet 31 May. Extensive damage to masts and rigging.
Républicain	First rate	110	Counter-admiral Joseph-Marie Nielly; Captain Pierre-Mandé Lebeau; Captain Louger	Unknown			Totally dismasted.
Sans Pareil	Third rate	80	Captain Courand	260	120	380	Attached from Nielly's squadron. Totally dismasted. Captured, subsequently HMS Sans Pareil.
Scipion	Third rate	80	Captain Huguet	64	151	215	Totally dismasted.
Pelletier	Third rate	74	Captain Berrade; Captain Raillard	Unknown			
Galathée	Frigate	32		Unknown			
Gentille	Frigate	32		Unknown			
Ships ordered by position in the line of battle (Guérin, vol. 6, pp. 503–04)

=== Attached squadrons ===
Admiral Van Stabel's convoy escort
Ship	Rate	Guns	Commander	Casualties			Notes
Ship	Rate	Guns	Commander	Killed	Wounded	Total	Notes
Jean Bart	Third rate	74	Counter-admiral Pierre Jean Van Stabel	-	-	-	
Tigre	Third rate	74		-	-	-	
Embuscade	Frigate	32	Lieutenant Maxime Julien Émeriau de Beauverger	-	-	-	
Van Stabel's squadron was accompanied by one more frigate and a brig.

Admiral Cornic's squadron
Ship	Rate	Guns	Commander	Casualties			Notes
Ship	Rate	Guns	Commander	Killed	Wounded	Total	Notes
Majestueux	First rate	110	Counter-admiral Pierre-François Cornic	-	-	-	
Aquilon	Third rate	74	Captain Thevenaut	-	-	-	
Jupiter	Third rate	74		-	-	-	
Marat	Third rate	74		-	-	-	
Nestor	Third rate	74		-	-	-	
Redoutable	Third rate	74		-	-	-	
Révolution	Third rate	74		-	-	-	
Superbe	Third rate	74		-	-	-	
Cornic's squadron was accompanied by two frigates, a corvette and a cutter.

The various French units patrolling in the Bay of Biscay kept in contact through a large number of frigates and smaller craft which passed messages between the commanders. This close contact enabled the French fleets to successfully divert the British away from the convoy. Due to the turbulent situation existing in France during 1794, accurate records regarding which frigates were with which fleet and which were present at which action do not exist. Thus only an incomplete listing of French support craft can be created, based mainly on those recognised and reported by British officers.

Attached frigates
Ship	Rate	Guns	Commander	Casualties			Notes
Ship	Rate	Guns	Commander	Killed	Wounded	Total	Notes
Bellone	Fifth rate	36		-	-	-	
Seine	Fifth rate			-	-	-	
Tamise	Fifth rate	32	Captain Jean-Marthe-Adrien l'Hermite	-	-	-	Present at the Glorious First of June.
Galathée	Fifth rate	32		-	-	-	Present at the Glorious First of June.
Républicaine ?	Corvette	24		-	-	-	Captured and burnt 27 May.
Inconnue	Corvette	16		-	-	-	Captured and burnt 27 May.
