= John Evans (archdeacon of Surrey) =

John Mascal Evans (17 May 1915 - 29 February 1996) was an Anglican priest, most notably archdeacon of Surrey from 1968 to 1980.

Evans was educated at St John's School, Leatherhead; Brasenose College, Oxford; and Wells Theological College. He was ordained priest in 1939, having been made deacon the previous year. He served as a curate in Epsom from 1938 to 1943. In August 1940, he escorted children being evacuated to Canada as part of Children's Overseas Reception Board.

In 1938, he became minister of the conventional district of St John the Baptist, Stoneleigh, and five years later he became perpetual curate for the same parish. He was then vicar of Fleet (1952-1960) and vicar of Walton-on-Thames (1960-1968). During his time in Walton, St Mary's Church was extended.

Evans was appointed an honorary canon of Guildford Cathedral in 1963 and became archdeacon of Surrey in 1968. Evans retired on 30 September 1980 and was succeeded as archdeacon by Paul Everard Barber, vicar of Farnham.

Evans was the younger brother of Lewis Evans, who was bishop of Barbados from 1960 to 1972.

Church of England titles
Preceded by Augustine John de Clare Studdert	Archdeacon of Surrey; 1968–1980	Succeeded by Paul Everard Barber
