= John Cooke (Royal Navy officer) =

Royal Navy officer (1762–1805)

Captain John Cooke
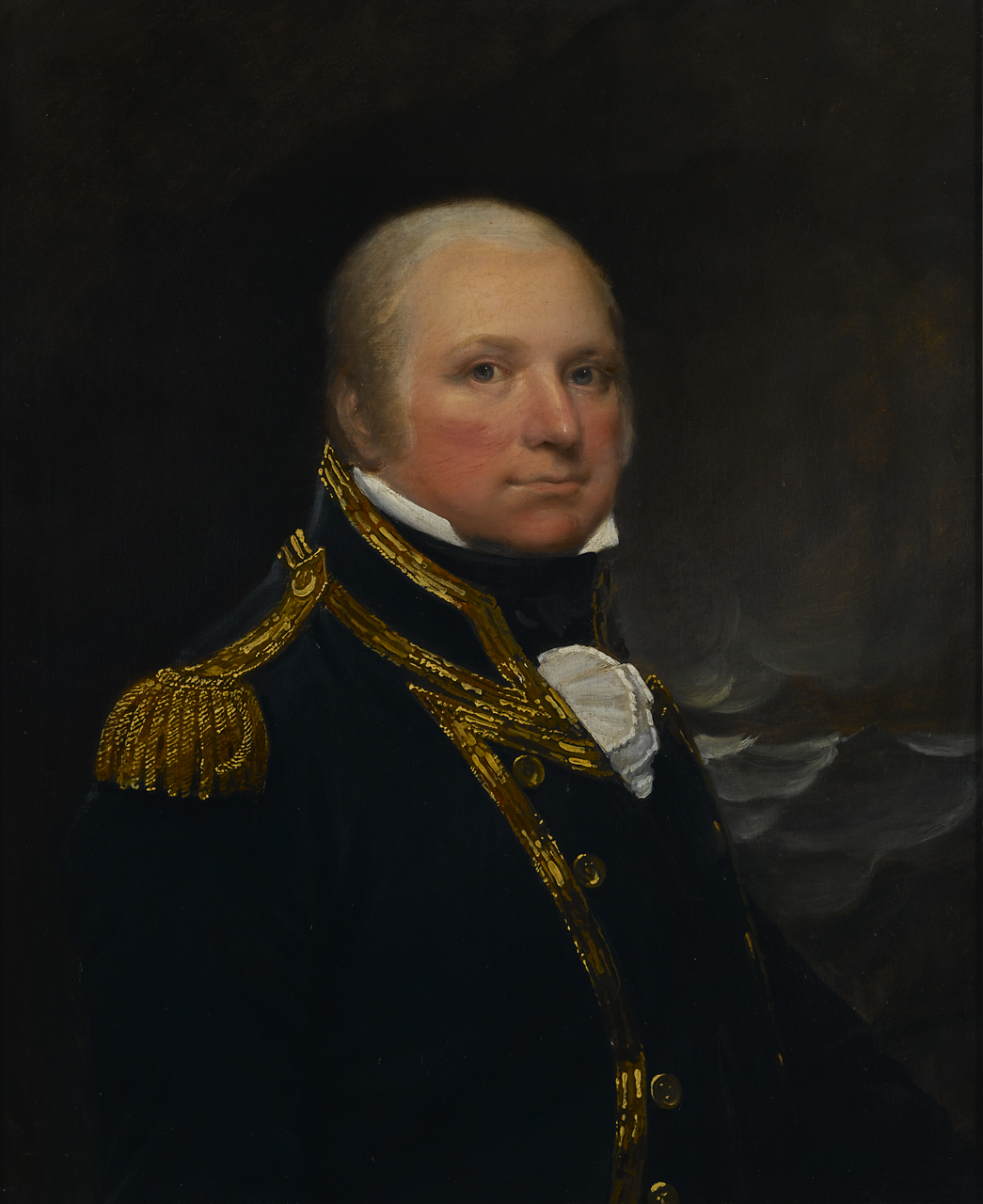
- Portrait by Lemuel Francis Abbott, c. 1797–1803
- Born: 17 February 1762; Goodman's Fields, London
- Died: 21 October 1805 (aged 43); Off Cape Trafalgar, Atlantic Ocean
- Military career
- Allegiance: Great Britain; United Kingdom
- Branch: Royal Navy
- Service years: 1776–1805
- Rank: Captain
- Commands: HMS Incendiary; HMS Monarch; HMS Nymphe; HMS Amethyst; HMS Bellerophon
- Conflicts: American War of Independence; Battle of Rhode Island; French Revolutionary Wars; Glorious First of June; Napoleonic Wars; Battle of Trafalgar †

Captain John Cooke (17 February 1762 – 21 October 1805) was a Royal Navy officer who served in the American War of Independence and French Revolutionary and Napoleonic Wars. Cooke is best known for his death in hand-to-hand combat with French forces during the Battle of Trafalgar in 1805. During the action, his ship HMS Bellerophon was badly damaged and boarded by sailors and marines from the French ship of the line Aigle. Cooke was killed in the ensuing melee, but his crew successfully drove off their opponents and ultimately forced the surrender of Aigle.

Cooke, unlike many of his fellow officers, was never a notable society figure. He was however well respected in his profession and following his death was the subject of tributes from officers who had served alongside him. Memorials to him were placed in St Paul's Cathedral and his local church in Wiltshire.

== Early life ==
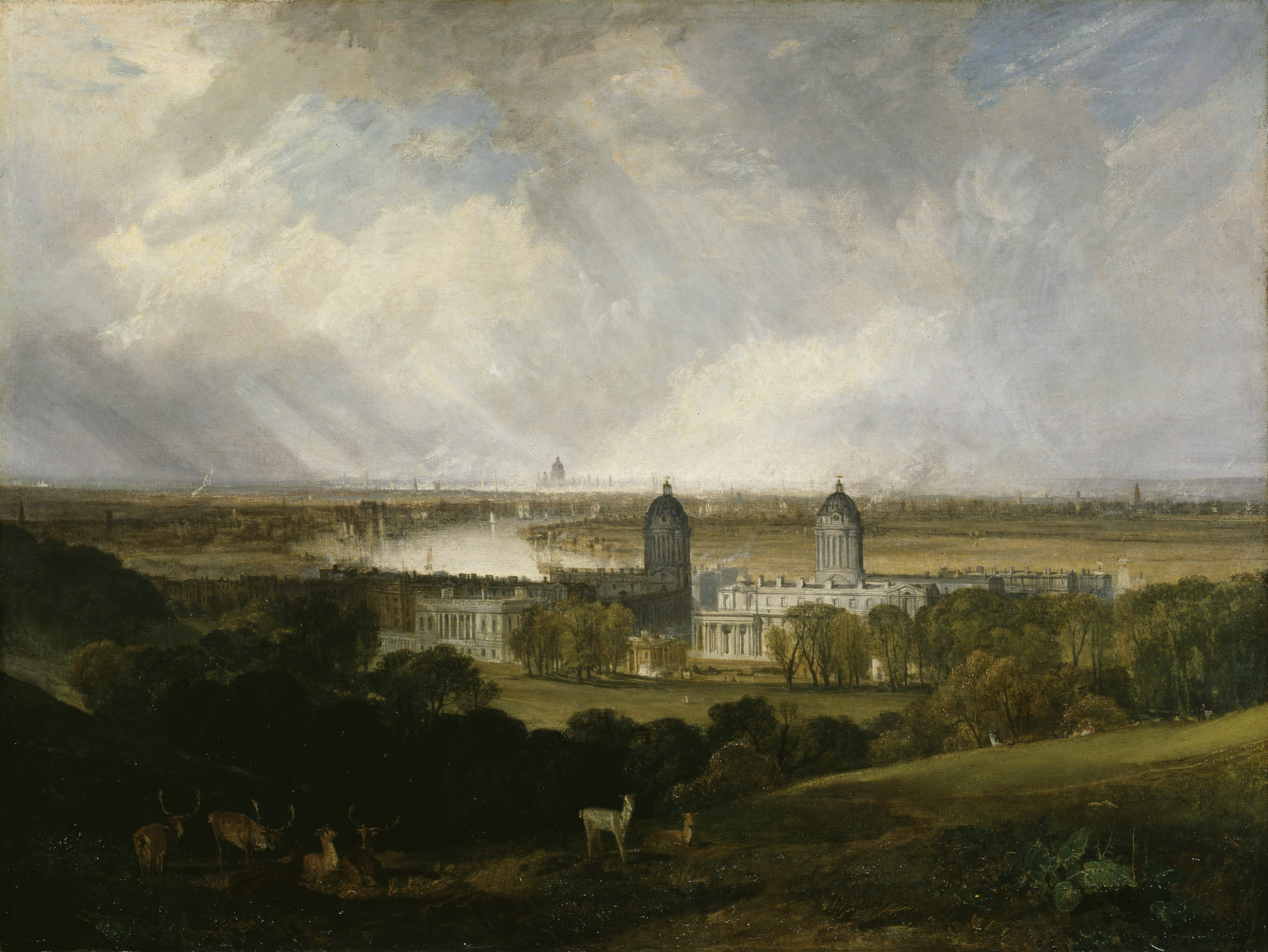
Greenwich Hospital, which Cooke's father served as the treasurer of

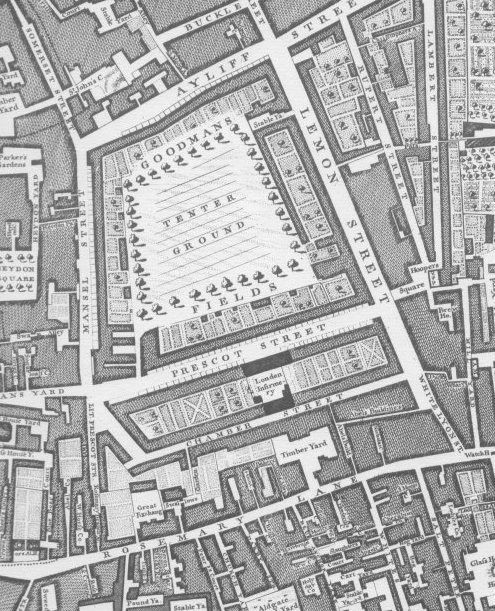
John Cooke was born on 17 February 1762, the second son of Francis Cooke (1728–1792) and his wife, Margaret (1729–1796), née Baker. (Note: The Tenterground in Goodman's Fields marked on John Rocque's maps of London A number of sources, including Thomas Heathcote's Nelson's Trafalgar Captains and Their Battles (2005), Colin White's The Trafalgar Captains (2005), and John Knox Laughton's entry for Cooke in the Dictionary of National Biography (2004), give a birth year of 1763 and omit most information about Cooke's early life. Nicholas Tracy's entry in Who's Who in Nelson's Navy (2006) provides fuller coverage of Cooke's early life, and includes a specific baptism date. Cooke's baptism register entry, for the parish of St Mary, Whitechapel, records that he was "borne [sic] 17th February" and baptised "in 4 Tenters". Tenters was then part of the Tenterground in Goodman's Fields, London. Joseph Howard's Miscellanea Genealogica et Heraldica (1896) states the same birth and baptism date (as well as naming godparents), and goes further, by stating that the baptism took place at the Cooke's home. Furthermore, Cooke's father, Francis, is recorded in the 1762 Land Tax Assessment Book for the Parish of St Mary, Whitechapel, as residing between Alie Street and Leman Street (West side), close to the corner of North and East Tenter streets. At the time, Francis worked as a ledger writer at the nearby Navy Pay Office on Broad Street. Lastly, Cooke's elder brother, Christopher, was also baptised at the Cooke's home in the parish of St Mary, on 8 August 1759, and the baptism register entry records that he was baptised "in the Tenter Ground Goodman [sic] Fields".) Francis was the third son of the Reverend John Cooke and Elizabeth, eldest daughter of Dr. Thomas Sayer, Archdeacon of Surrey. Margaret was the second daughter of Moses and Mary Baker, of the Parish of St Christopher le Stocks, in the City of London. The Cooke family line had come from Devon, where they had been landowners and shipowners at Kenbury, near Exeter and Topsham. The Reverend John Cooke was a former rector of Chilbolton and Bishop's Waltham, and was appointed a Canon and 5th Prebendary of Winchester Cathedral by Bishop Trelawny.

By 1750, Francis was established at Greenwich as an Admiralty ledger writer in the Cashiers' Branch of the Navy Pay Office, and as the treasurer of the Greenwich Hospital, London. (Note: For the location of the Navy Pay Office, see the "notice" in the 1 March 1763 edition of The London Gazette.) Francis became a director of the Amicable Society for a Perpetual Assurance Office by 1775, and on 17 July 1787, The Right Honourable Henry Dundas appointed him Cashier of the Navy. Francis had married Margaret on 29 May 1757 at St Mary's, Chatham, Kent. (Note: For the register of marriage, see entry number 196 in the "register of marriages and banns, St Mary, Chatham" (1757).) John Cooke was baptised on 5 March 1762, at the Cooke's home in the Tenterground at Goodman's Fields, in the parish of St Mary, Whitechapel. Sir John Bentley and William Henry Ricketts, were godfathers, Mrs Pigott of Bloomsbury Square, was godmother. (Note: Probably Jane Pigott the wife of Thomas Pigott. Jane was godmother to Cooke's younger sister Jane. Thomas was the godfather to Cooke's elder sister Margaret. William Henry Ricketts of New Canaan Plantation, St James, Jamaica, and Longwood, Hampshire.)

== Early naval career ==
John Cooke first went to sea at the age of eleven aboard the cutter HMS Greyhound under Lieutenant John Bazely, before going ashore to spend time at Mr Braken's naval academy at Greenwich. He was entered onto the books of one of the royal yachts by Sir Alexander Hood, who would become an enduring patron of Cooke's. In 1776 he obtained a position as a midshipman on the ship of the line HMS Eagle, aged thirteen. Cooke served aboard Eagle, the flagship of the North American Station, during the next three years, seeing extensive action along the eastern seaboard. Notable among these actions were the naval operations around the Battle of Rhode Island in 1778, when Eagle was closely engaged with American units ashore. He distinguished himself in the assault, causing Admiral Lord Howe to exclaim "Why, young man, you wish to become a Lieutenant before you are of sufficient age!" On 21 January 1779, Cooke was promoted to lieutenant and joined HMS Superb in the East Indies under Sir Edward Hughes, but was forced to take a leave of absence due to ill-health.

Cooke returned to England and then went to France to spend a year studying, before rejoining the navy in 1782 with an appointment to the 90-gun HMS Duke under Captain Alan Gardner. Cooke saw action at the Battle of the Saintes, at which Duke was heavily engaged. He remained with Gardner following the signing of the Treaty of Paris in 1783, bringing an end to the American War of Independence, and served as his first-lieutenant aboard his next command, the 50-gun HMS Europa. Gardner became commodore at Jamaica, flying his broad pennant aboard Europa and retaining Cooke as his first-lieutenant until Cooke was injured in a bad fall and had to be invalided home. He had recovered sufficiently by the time of the Spanish Armament in 1790 to be able to take up an appointment from his old patron, Sir Alexander Hood, to be third-lieutenant of his flagship, the 90-gun HMS London. When the crisis passed without breaking into open war, London was paid off and Cooke went ashore.

== Frigate command ==
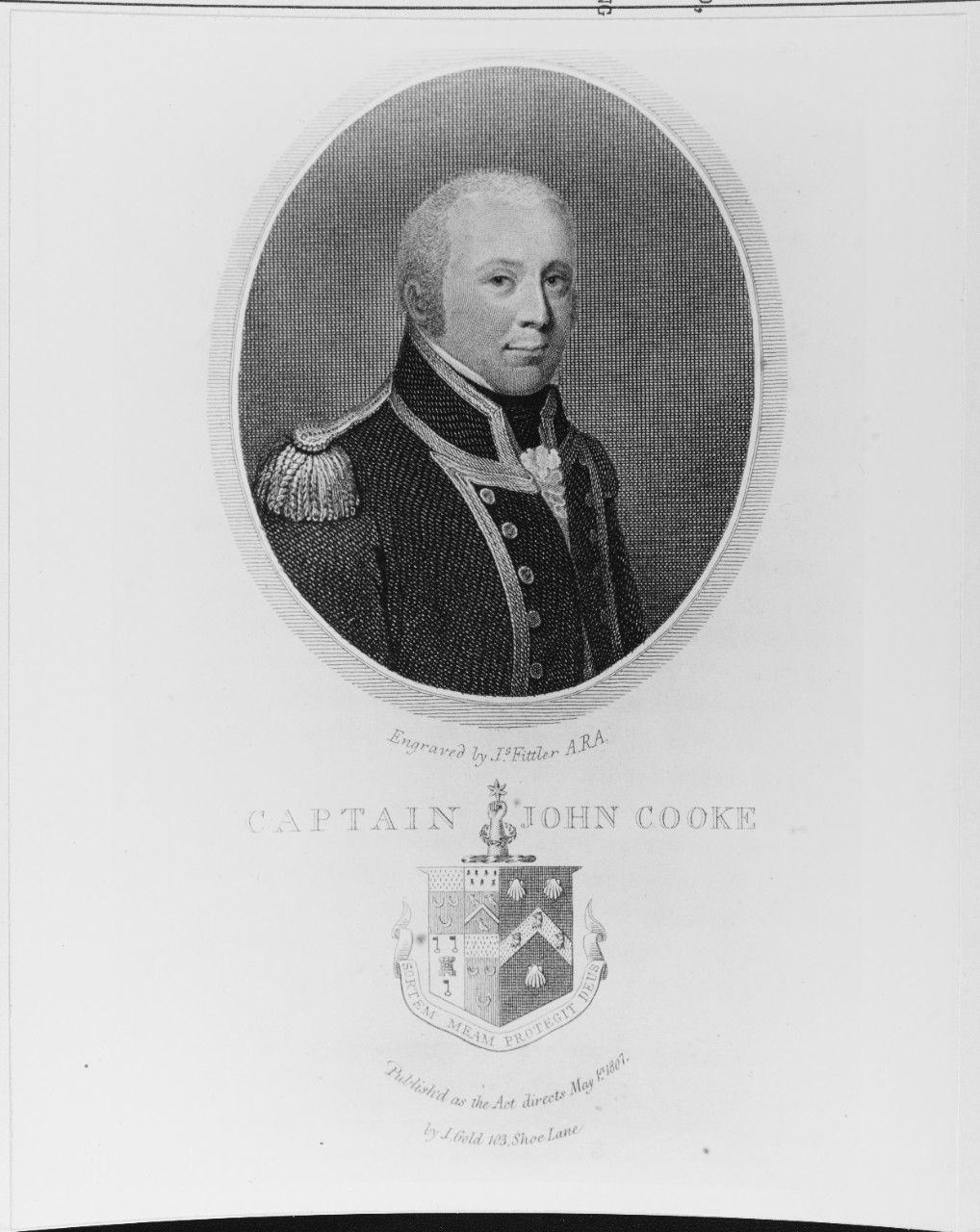
1807 portrait of Cooke by James Fittler

With the outbreak of the French Revolutionary Wars in February 1793, Cooke rejoined Hood and became first-lieutenant of his new flagship, the 100-gun HMS Royal George, part of the Channel Fleet. On 21 February 1794, Cooke was promoted to commander and given his first independent command, the small fire ship HMS Incendiary. Three months later, Incendiary was a signal repeater for the Channel Fleet during the Atlantic campaign of May 1794, relaying Lord Howe's signals to the fleet and operating as a scout in the search for the French fleet under Louis Thomas Villaret de Joyeuse. On 1 June 1794, Cooke was a witness to the battle of the Glorious First of June, although his tiny ship was far too small to engage in combat. In the action's aftermath, Cooke was included in the general promotions issued to the fleet, becoming a post-captain on 23 July 1794. For a year, Cooke was stationed off Newfoundland as flag captain to Sir James Wallace aboard the 74-gun HMS Monarch, before returning to Britain and being offered command of the 28-gun HMS Tourterelle. Cooke accepted, but when he found out she was ordered to the West Indies, he resigned it, having been told by Gardner that further service in the West Indies would likely kill him.

Instead in early 1796 he took command of the 36-gun frigate HMS Nymphe. Nymphe was employed in the blockade of the French Atlantic ports over the next year, and on 9 March 1797 was in company with HMS St Fiorenzo when they encountered the returning ships of a short-lived French invasion attempt of Britain that had been defeated at Fishguard in Wales. The French ships attempted to escape into Brest, but were hunted down by the British, who forced the surrender of Résistance and Constance in turn after successive short engagements. Neither of the British ships suffered a single casualty in the combat, and both French ships were subsequently purchased into the Royal Navy, bringing prize money to Cooke and his crew.

Despite this success, Cooke was unpopular with his men due to the strict discipline he enforced aboard his ship. This was graphically demonstrated just two months after the action off Brest, when Nymphe became embroiled in the Spithead mutiny. Cooke attempted to assist Admiral John Colpoys at the mutiny's outbreak, and was ordered ashore by his crew when he tried to return to his ship. Cooke was tactfully removed from command by the Admiralty following the mutiny, although he was returned to service two years later aboard the new frigate HMS Amethyst in preparation for the Anglo-Russian invasion of the Batavian Republic. During the invasion, Amethyst conveyed the Duke of York to the Netherlands and later participated in the evacuation of the force following the campaign's collapse.

Cooke was involved in operations in Quiberon Bay during the remainder of 1799, and in 1800 participated in an abortive invasion of Ferrol. During this time, Amethyst captured six French merchant ships and small privateers. During 1801, Cooke participated in the capture of the Dédaigneuse off Cape Finisterre, helping Samuel Hood Linzee and Richard King chase her down on 26 January. Amethyst was not heavily engaged with Dédaigneuse and received no damage, but aided in pursuing and trapping the French ship so that she could be seized. Dédaigneuse was later purchased into the Royal Navy as HMS Dedaigneuse. Shortly afterwards, Cooke captured the Spanish ship Carlotta and the French privateer Général Brune in the same area.

== Trafalgar and death ==
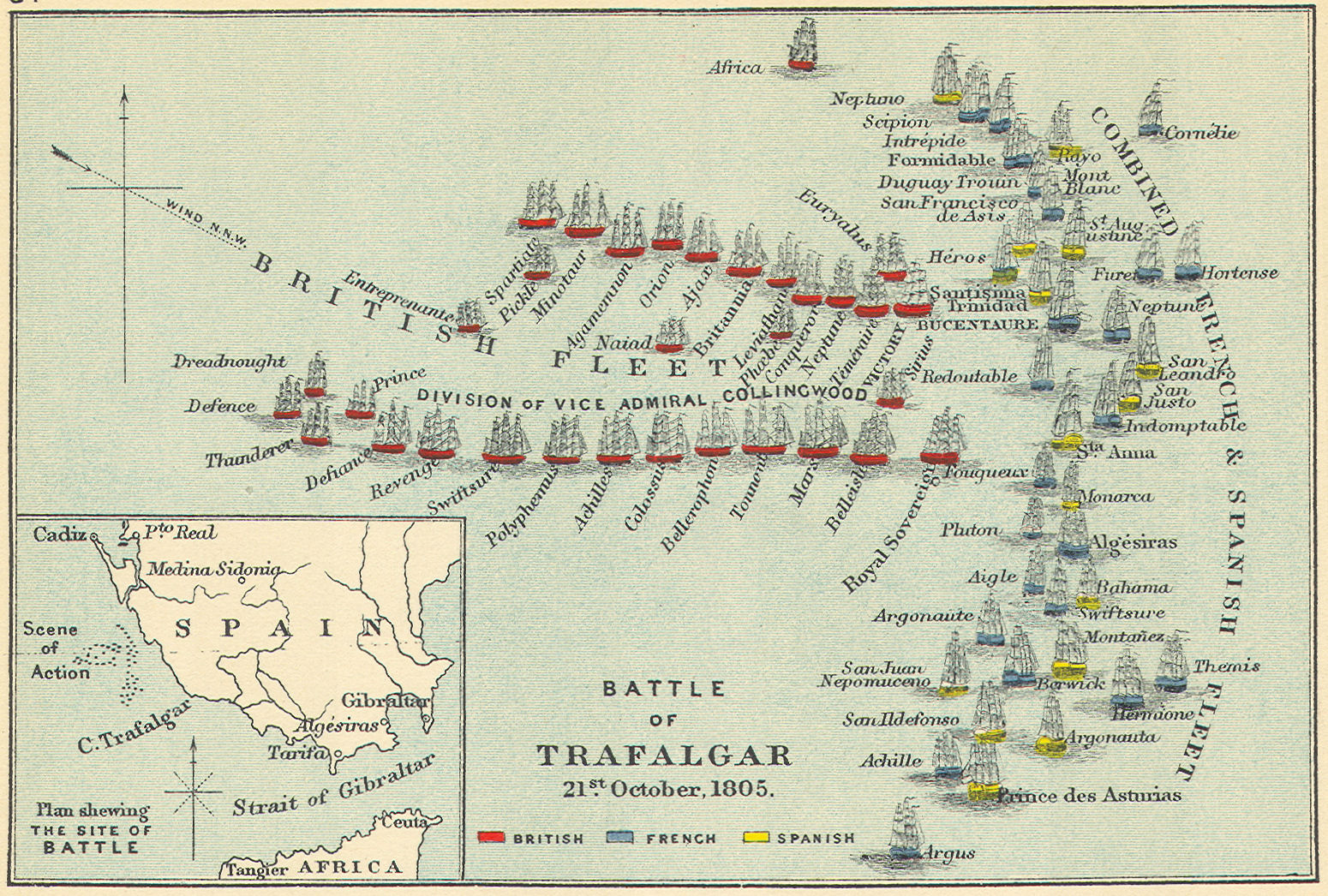
Map of the Battle of Trafalgar

Following the Peace of Amiens between Britain and France in March 1802, Cooke briefly retired on half-pay before being recalled to the Royal Navy after the Napoleonic Wars began in May 1803. Admiral Sir William Young requested him to serve as his flag captain at Plymouth, but Cooke tactfully refused and instead applied for active service. He received command of HMS Bellerophon on 25 April 1805. In May, after the large combined French and Spanish fleet, under Admiral Pierre-Charles Villeneuve escaped from Toulon, beginning the Trafalgar campaign, Cooke was ordered to join a flying squadron under Vice-Admiral Cuthbert Collingwood. The squadron arrived off Cádiz on 9 June and Collingwood detached Bellerophon and three other ships to blockade Cartagena under Rear-Admiral Sir Richard Bickerton. When the combined fleet entered Cádiz on 20 August, Collingwood recalled Bickerton's force and mounted a blockade of the port. Collingwood was reinforced with more ships, and was later superseded by Nelson. Cooke was heard to say at this time that "To be in a general engagement with Nelson would crown all my military ambition." Nelson had Villeneuve's fleet trapped in Cádiz and was blockading the harbour awaiting their expected attempt to escape.

The Franco-Spanish fleet escaped Cádiz on 18 October 1805, but was soon chased down by Nelson and brought to battle on 21 October. Nelson formed his fleet into two divisions; the weather column would attack to the north under his direct command and the lee column would operate to the south under the command of Cuthbert Collingwood in HMS Royal Sovereign. Cooke was stationed fifth in Collingwood's line, and so was one of the first ships engaged in action with the combined fleet. Cooke took the unusual step of informing his first lieutenant William Pryce Cumby and his master Edward Overton of Nelson's orders, in case he should be killed.

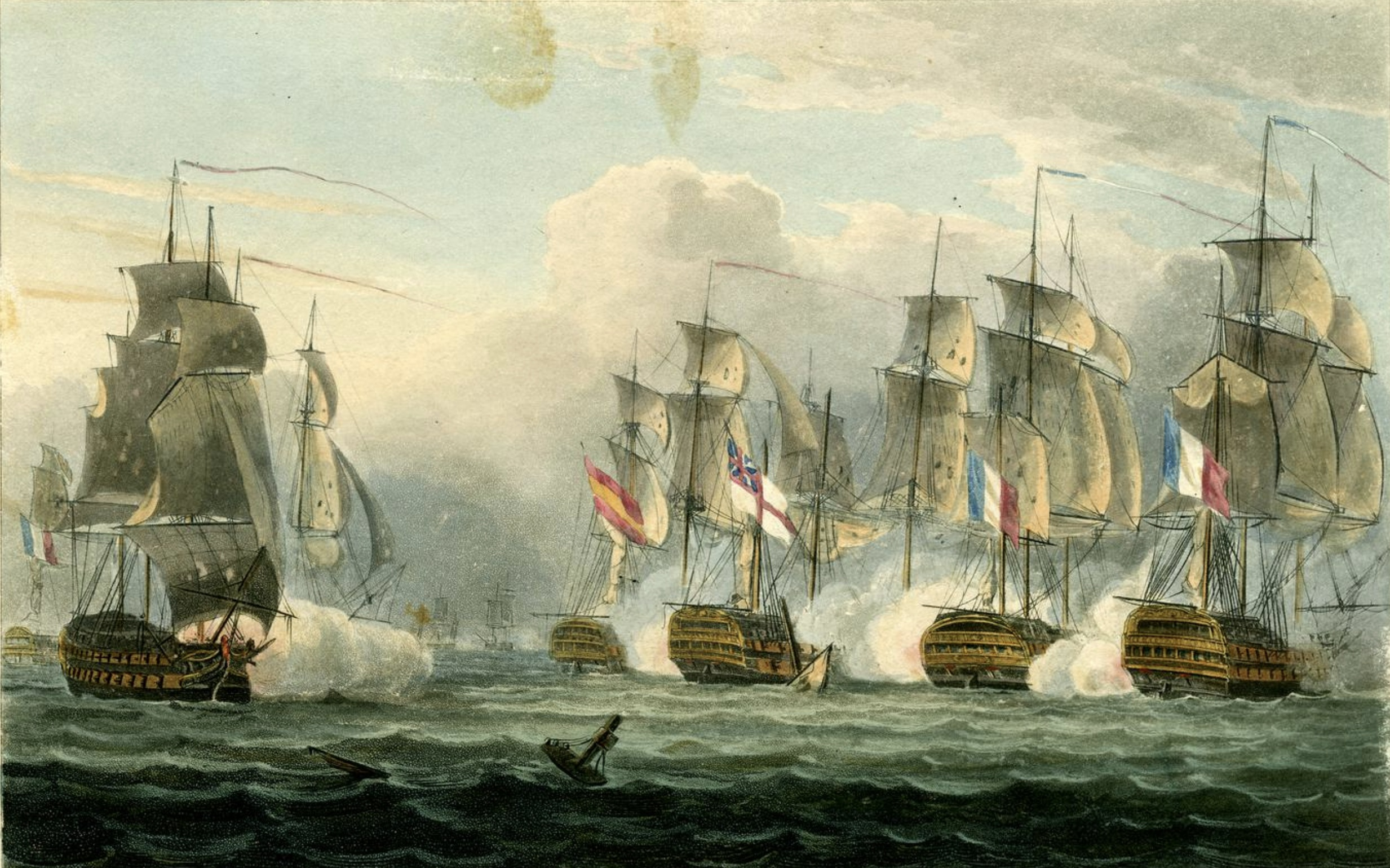
Aquatint of Bellerophon (centre) at the moment of Cooke's death

Bellerophon was soon closely engaged with the French, breaking through the enemy line and closing with Aigle. As with the other French ships in the fleet, Aigle's rigging and mastheads were occupied by musketeers and grenadiers, who kept up a steady fire on Bellerophon and took a heavy toll of sailors exposed on the British ship's deck. Much of the fire was directed at the quarterdeck, where Cooke, Cumby and Overton stood. Cumby noted with surprise that Cooke was still wearing his uniform coat, which sported epaulettes that marked him out as the ship's captain to French marksmen. Cooke had forgotten to remove the epaulettes and recognised the danger they represented, but replied "It is too late to take them off. I see my situation, but I will die like a man."

As the action continued, Captain Pierre‑Paul Gourège of Aigle ordered his crew to board and seize Bellerophon, hoping to use their superiority of numbers to overwhelm the British crew. Cooke sent Cumby below to make sure that the lower-deck guns continued to fire into the French ship as the battle continued overhead, and threw himself at the French sailors pouring onto Bellerophon's quarterdeck, shooting an enemy officer dead and engaging in hand-to-hand combat with the men behind him. Within minutes Cumby had returned to the deck with reinforcements from below, passing the mortally wounded Overton on the ladder. The badly wounded ship's quartermaster was also present, and he informed Cumby that Cooke had fallen in the melee. Cumby's charge cleared the French from the deck of Bellerophon, and he found Cooke dead on the quarterdeck, two musket balls lodged in his chest. Cooke's last words had been "Let me lie quietly a minute. Tell Lieutenant Cumby never to strike."

Cumby took charge of the battered Bellerophon, directing her fire into Aigle and ultimately forcing the French ship's surrender after the arrival of other British vessels. Bellerophon had suffered grievously, losing 27 dead and 127 wounded. Although Aigle was lost in the chaotic storm which followed the battle, Bellerophon survived, primarily due to Cumby's leadership. He was later promoted to post captain for his services in the action. Cooke's body was buried at sea the day after the battle with the other fatal casualties from Bellerophon.

== Family and legacy ==
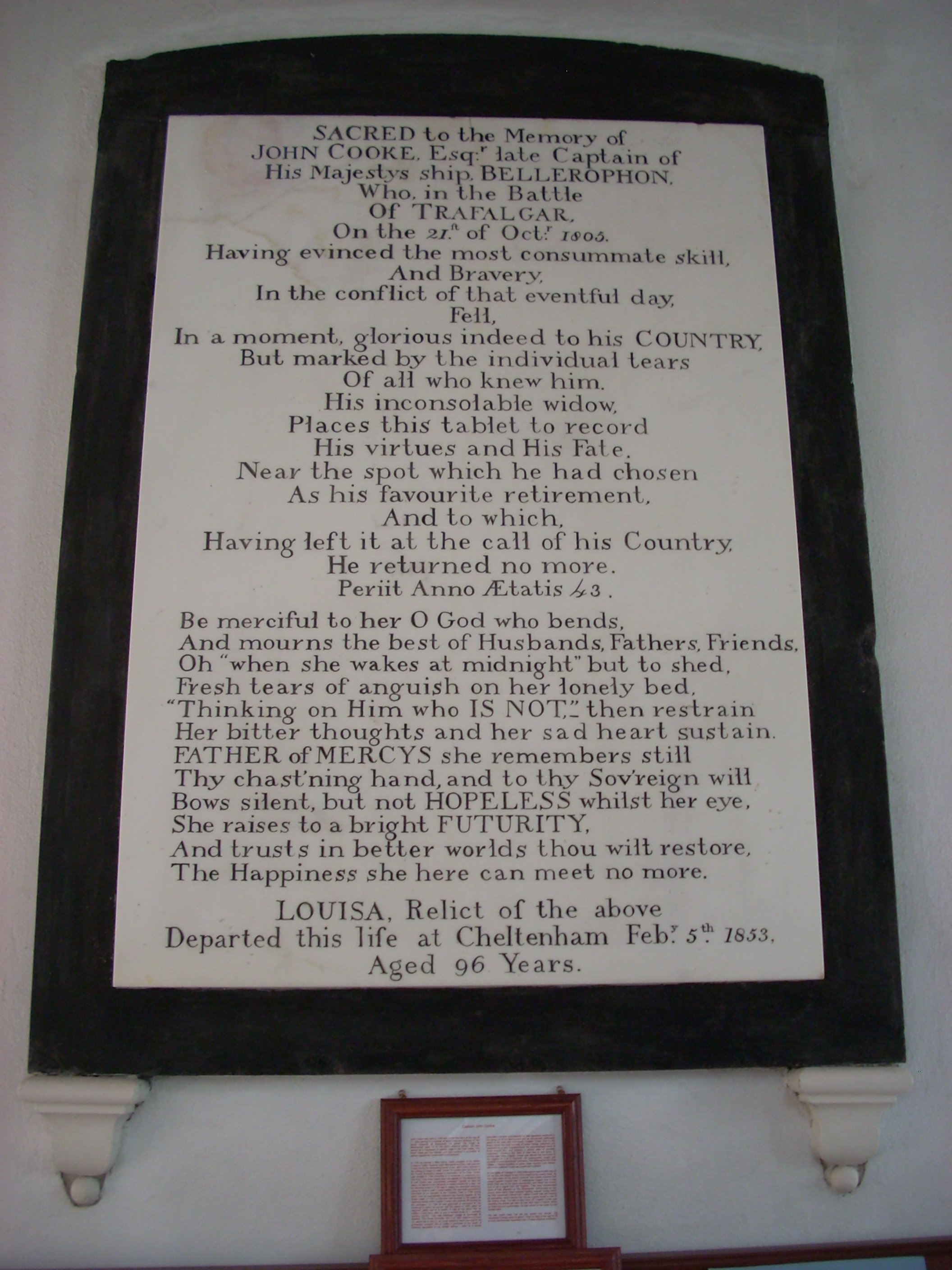
Memorial to Cooke in St Andrew's Church, Donhead St Andrew

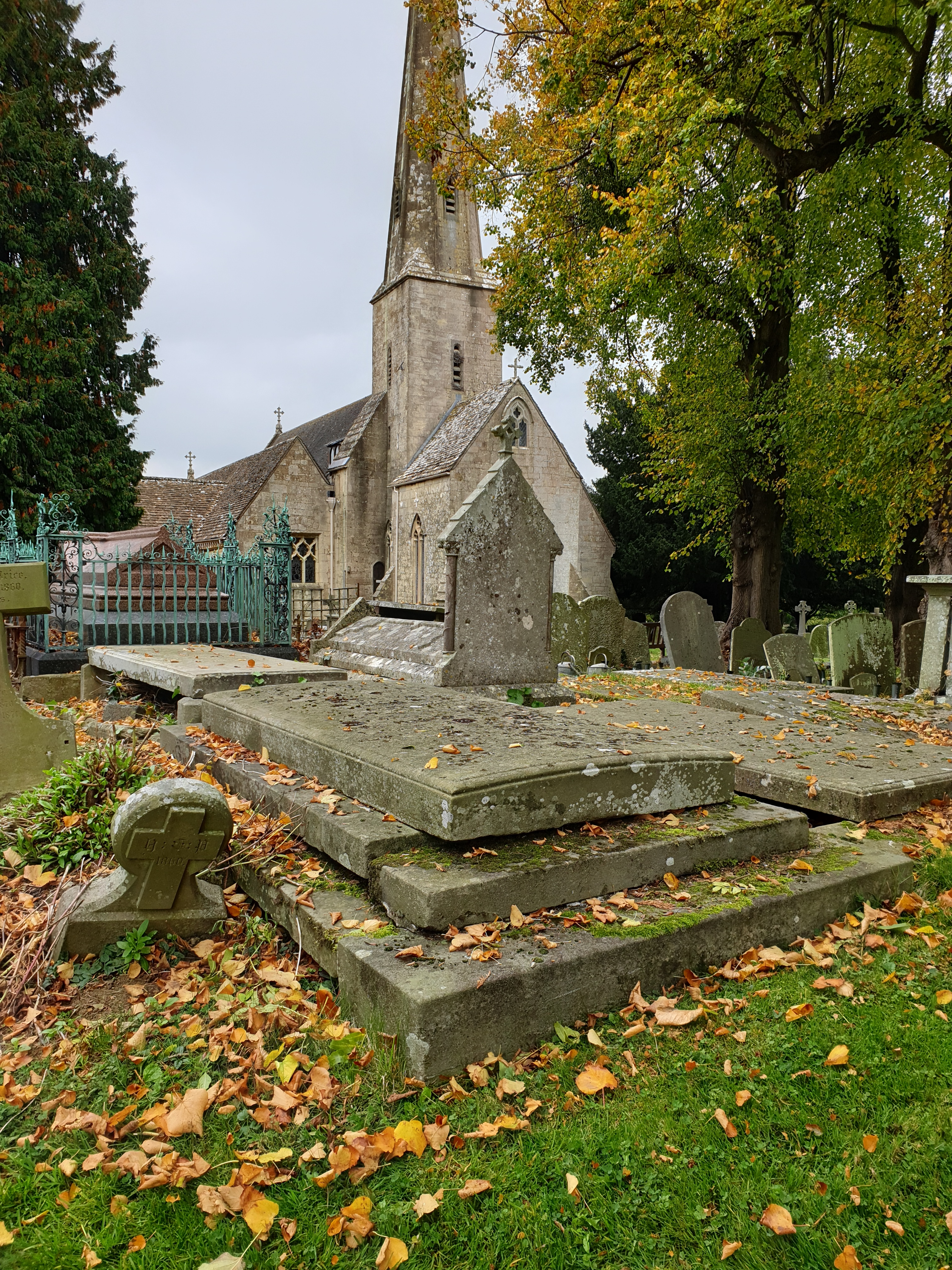
Gravestone

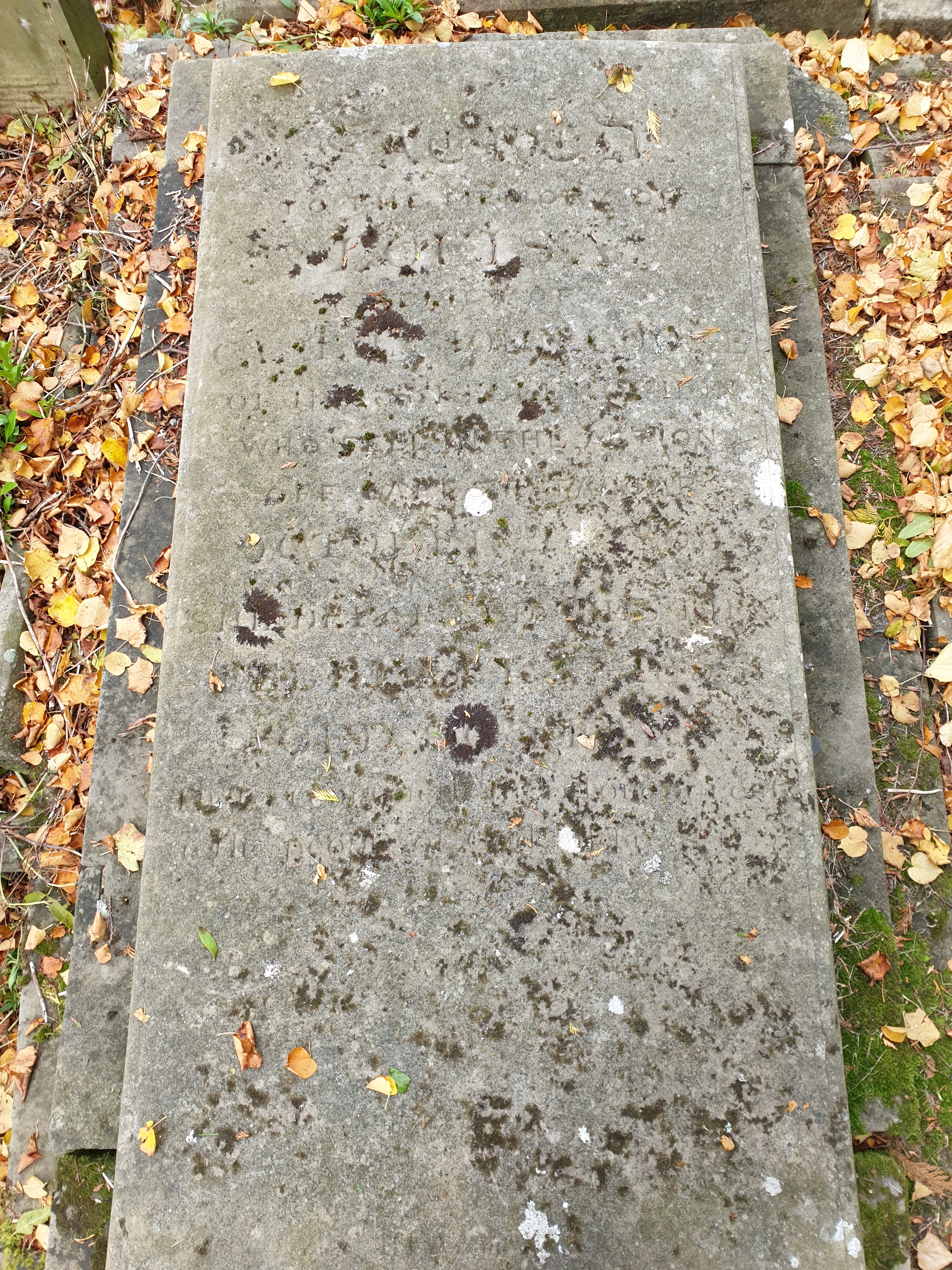
Inscription

The grave of Louisa Cooke at St Peter's, Leckhampton

Cooke's death, as with those of George Duff and Admiral Nelson himself, was widely mourned in Britain. Cooke's widow Louisa and their eight-year-old daughter, Louisa Charlotte, were given numerous awards and presents, including the gold medal minted for the captains who had fought at the action, and a large silver vase presented by Lloyd's Patriotic Fund. The gold medal and vase were gifted to the nation by Caroline Augusta Rolles, Cooke's great-granddaughter, after her own death on 14 January 1931. (Note: Ada Louisa Rolles died on 18 April 1931 and left her interest in the gold medal and vase to her sister Caroline Augusta for life, and afterwards, to the Greenwich Hospital. For the details of Ada Louisa's bequest see "Cheltenham Lady's Will" in the 25 June 1930 edition of the Cheltenham Chronicle. For the Greenwich Hospital bequest records, see "List of Admiralty Records" (1974).) On 12 April 1806, Louisa and Louisa Charlotte were awarded a widow and child pension by the British Government, of £200 (equivalent to £15,500 in 2025) and £50 respectively.

At least some of the money the family received was spent on a large wall plaque mounted in St Andrew's Church in Donhead St Andrew, Wiltshire, close to the family home at Donhead Lodge in St Bartholomew's Street. The plaque commemorates Cooke's life and death and also that of his wife. A memorial was also raised to him in St Paul's Cathedral. Tributes from fellow officers were also forthcoming, including from the future explorer John Franklin, who had served on Bellerophon at Trafalgar and had said of Cooke that he was "very gentlemanly and active. I like his appearance very much." A number of letters that Cooke wrote to his brother prior to Trafalgar are held by the National Maritime Museum.

Cooke had married Louisa, née Hardy, on 15 June 1790 at St Leonard's, Shoreditch. Louisa was the fourth daughter of Josiah Hardy, the former Governor of New Jersey, and later consul at Cádiz. Cooke had leased Donhead Lodge from Baron Henry Arundell in 1803 and Louisa remained in residence there until 1813. She died at her home, 9 Montpellier Terrace, Montpellier, Cheltenham, on 5 February 1853 (aged 96). The funeral was held at St Peter's, Leckhampton, on 11 February 1853, with interment following in the churchyard. (Note: For the location of the grave and inscription, see "Leckhampton St Peter Monumental Inscriptions. Grave identification K14": "Sacred to the memory of Louisa, relict of Captain John Cooke of H.M.S. Bellerophon, who fell in the action off Cape Trafalgar. October 21. 1805. She departed this life February 5th 1853 aged 96 years. There remaineth therefore a rest to the people of God Hebrews 4:9".) Louisa Charlotte Cooke, their only child, was born on 26 January 1797 at Stoke Damerel, Plymouth. Louisa Charlotte married Abraham John Newenham Devonsher of Kilshanick, County Cork, at Cheltenham, on 9 March 1820. Formerly of Hinton Charterhouse, she died after a short illness at St Anne's, Albion Street, Cheltenham, on 30 April 1871 (aged 74). (Note: For Louisa's probate notice and previous residence, see the "deceased estate notice" in the 9 January 1872 edition of the London Daily News. For Louisa's place of death, see the "death notice" in the 3 May 1871 edition of the Cheltenham Examiner.) She was interred at Bouncer's Lane Cemetery, Prestbury, Cheltenham, on 5 May 1871. (Note: For the gravestone inscription, see Gloucestershire Notes and Queries (1890).)

== Arms ==
The original arms were granted and confirmed by the Heralds' College to John Cooke, of Exeter, in 1687. According to Burke, in A Visitation of Arms (1852), and Berry, in Encyclopædia Heraldica (1828), Cooke bore:

Coat of arms of John Cooke
Notes Sayer and Baker were the respective maiden names of Cooke's grandmother, Elizabeth, and mother, Margaret. Crest A dexter arm, erect, proper encircled with a wreath of laurel vert (green), the hand holding an estoile argent. Escutcheon Gules (red) three crescents or (gold), a chief of the last, quartering, Sayer, viz. gules a chevron between three sea-pies argent (white) a chief ermine; and Baker being argent a castle between three keys sable (black). Impaled by Hardy, viz. sable on a chevron ermine between three escallops argent as many griffins' heads, erased of the field. Motto Sortem meam protegit Deus, translates as "God protects my fate".

== See also ==
- Bibliography of 18th–19th century Royal Naval history
- HMS Bellerophon
- John Cooke, Cooke's uncle and Vice-Chancellor of the University of Oxford from 1788 until 1792
- Sir Charles Hardy, Admiral of the Fleet and Governor of New York

== Bibliography ==
- Blacker, Reverend Beaver Henry, ed. (1890). Gloucestershire Notes and Queries. Vol. 4. London: Simpkin, Marshall, Hamilton, Kent, & Co., Limited. p. 310. OCLC 982665719.
- "Cheltenham Lady's Will. Bequests to Charitable Organisations". Cheltenham Chronicle. 25 June 1930. p. 4. OCLC 900309697 – via British Newspaper Archive.
- "Deaths". Cheltenham Examiner. 3 May 1871. p. 2. OCLC 751718750 – via British Newspaper Archive.
- "Notice is hereby given to the Officers and Company of His Majesty's Ship Dolphin". The London Gazette. No. 10292. London. 1 March 1763. p. 3. OCLC 1013393168. Archived from the original on 9 February 2020.
- Heathcote, Thomas Anthony (9 February 2005). Nelson's Trafalgar Captains and their Battles: A Biographical and Historical Dictionary. Barnsley: Pen & Sword Maritime. ISBN 978-1-84415-182-0. OCLC 1026832230. "A biographical dictionary of the two flag officers and captains of 27 battleships, four frigates and two minor combatant vessels that were present under Nelson's command at the historic battle of Trafalgar, 21 October 1805."
- "Louisa Charlotte Devonsher". London Daily News. 9 January 1872. p. 7. OCLC 751658958 – via British Newspaper Archive.
- "Register of marriages and banns, St Mary, Chatham" (1757) [Digital image]. Chatham, St Mary Parish Records, Series: Incumbent: Registers and Services, ID: P85/1/45, p. 50. Strood: Medway Archives. Retrieved 22 September 2021.
- Public Record Office (1974). "Greenwich Hospital". List of Admiralty Records. Various classes. 1914 to 1945. Lists and indexes. Supplementary Series No. 6. Vol. 3. Millwood: Kraus-Thomson Organization Limited. p. 145. hdl:2027/uiug.30112100057659. ISBN 978-0-527-03976-9. OCLC 63630242.
- Rawes, Julian (2012). "Section K — Tombstone Inscriptions". In Miller, Eric (ed.). Leckhampton St Peter Monumental Inscriptions (with photos) (Report). Additional comments by Eric Miller. Later additions from Eric Miller added by Paul McGowan. Leckhampton: Gloucestershire Family History Society. p. 119. 1820 (Gloucestershire Archives Reference Number D10009).
