= John Holbrook =

John Holbrook may refer to:

- John Holbrook (bishop) (born 1962), Church of England bishop
- John Holbrook (publisher) (1761–1838), American publisher and entrepreneur
- John Edwards Holbrook (1796–1871), American zoologist
