= John Sapte =

Cleric and Archdeacon of Surrey

John Henry Sapte
- Born: 31 December 1821
- Died: 4 June 1906 (aged 84)
- Occupation: Cleric
- Spouse: Caroline Grifford (m. 1848; died 1862)

Ven. John Henry Sapte (1821–1906) was a Church of England cleric who was the Archdeacon of Surrey from 1888 until his death on 4 June 1906.

== Biography ==
Sapte was born on New Year's Eve 1821. the 2nd son of Francis and Anna Sapte. In 1848, he married Caroline Grifford, daughter of the Robert Gifford, 1st Baron Gifford. They had four sons and one daughter together. He was educated at Emmanuel College, Cambridge and ordained in 1845. After a short curacy at Cuddesdon he was Rector of Cranleigh, Surrey from 1846 until his death in June 1906. He was also an Honorary Canon of Winchester from 1871 to 1888; Proctor in Convocation (representative) for the clergy of the Surrey Archdeaconry from 1874 to 1888; and Rural Dean of Guildford from 1881 to 1888. Sapte was promoted to Archdeacon of Surrey from 1888 until his death on 4 June 1906.

He was an impetus towards and witness to the foundation of a medium-size independent day and boarding school, Cranleigh School in south-west Surrey.

== Notes ==
Church of England titles
Preceded by Peter Atkinson	Archdeacon of Surrey; 1888–1906	Succeeded by Frank Utterton
