= HMS Incendiary (1782) =

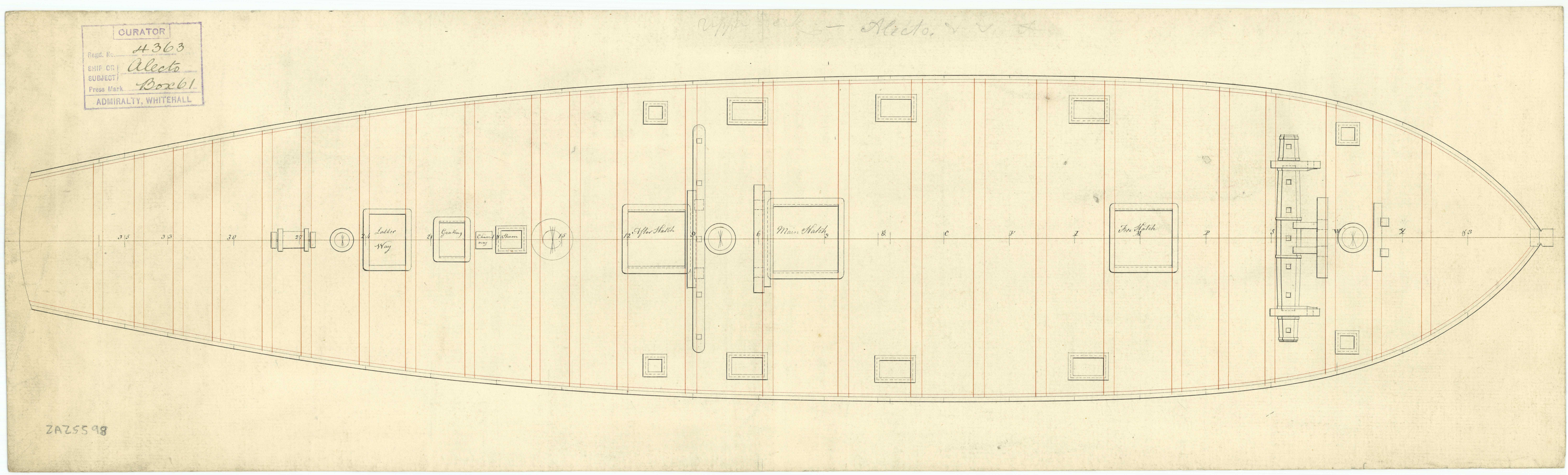
- Incendiary

History

Great Britain
- Name: HMS Incendiary
- Builder: Thomas King, Dover
- Launched: 12 August 1782
- Honours and awards: Naval General Service Medal (NGSM) with clasps: "1 June 1794"; "23 June 1795"
- Fate: Captured 29 January 1801 and scuttled

General characteristics
- Class & type: Tisiphone-class fireship
- Tons burthen: 421 64/94 bm
- Length: 108 ft 9 in (33.1 m) (overall); 90 ft 7 in (27.6 m) (keel)
- Beam: 29 ft 7 in (9.0 m)
- Depth of hold: 9 ft 0 in (2.7 m)
- Propulsion: Sails
- Sail plan: Full-rigged ship
- Complement: 55
- Armament: 8 × 12-pounder guns

HMS Incendiary was an 8-gun fireship of the Royal Navy. She was present at a number of major battles during the French Revolutionary Wars, and captured, or participated in the capture, of several armed vessels. In January 1801 she was in the Gulf of Cadiz where she encountered Admiral Ganteume's squadron. The 80-gun French Navy ship of the line Indivisible received the credit for the actual capture.

== Early career ==
Incendiary was commissioned in August 1782, but was paid off within the year. The Navy recommissioned her in September 1790 under Commander William Nowell, but then paid her off again.

== French Revolutionary Wars ==
Between January and April 1793, Incendiary underwent fitting out at Sheerness. The Navy recommissioned her in February under Commander William Hope, for Admiral Howe's fleet.

In February 1794 Commander John Cooke replaced Hope. Incendiary was then among the support ships in the order of battle at the Glorious First of June. In 1847 the Navy awarded the clasp "1 June 1794" to the NGSM to all surviving claimants from the battle.

In June Commander Richard Bagot replaced Cooke, only to have Commander John Draper replace him in April 1795. Incendiary was again among the support ships at the battle at the Île de Groix on 23 June. In 1847 the Navy awarded the clasp " 23rd June 1795" to the NGSM to all surviving claimants from the battle.

In July Commander Thomas Rogers replaced Draper, only to be replaced in August by Commander Henry Digby. In December 1796 Commander George Barker replaced Digby.

In January 1797, Incendiary participated in the aftermath of the French Expédition d'Irlande. On 8 January she was present when Daedalus and Majestic captured the French troopship Suffern off Ushant. Her captors burnt Suffern to avoid weakening their crews to man the prize.

Between July and September 1797 Incendiary was at Portsmouth undergoing refitting. In December 1799 she was under the command of Commander Richard Dunn. On 11 February 1800 Phoenix and Incendiary captured the French privateer Éole off Cape Spartel. Éole was armed with 10 guns and had a crew of 89 men. She was ten days out of Guelon, Spain, and had not taken any prizes.

In April 1800, Incendiary was on blockade duty at Cadiz as part of a squadron under Rear-Admiral John Thomas Duckworth. On 5 April the squadron sighted a Spanish convoy comprising thirteen merchant vessels and three accompanying frigates, and at once gave chase. When the larger British vessels reached Gibraltar they encountered Incendiary, which had made port the previous day with two captured vessels of her own. In all, the small British squadron managed to secure nine merchant vessels and two frigates.

Incendiary captured the French privateer brig Egyptienne (or Egyptien) in the Mediterranean on 12 May 1800. Egyptienne was armed with eight guns and had a crew of 50 men. (Note: Head money was paid in 1829, A first-class share was worth £58 16s 11¼d; a fifth-class share, that of a seaman, was worth 8s 5¼d.)

On 26 February 1801 two French brigs arrived at Plymouth carrying wine and brandy. Sprightly and Incendiary had captured them before falling prey to Ganteaume.

== Loss ==
Incendiary, under the command of Captain Richard Dun(n), was crossing the Gulf of Cádiz when at daybreak lookouts sighted two ships of the line. When these vessels did not return the private signals, she fled. Finally, at 11 p.m. on 29 January 1801, Indivisible captured Incendiary. The French removed her crew and scuttled her.

Captain Dunn, of Incendiary, underwent a court martial on 6 May aboard HMS Gladiator for the loss of his vessel. The court acquitted him.
