= Alex Hughes (priest) =

British priest in the Church of England (born 1975)

The Venerable Alex Hughes
- Archdeacon of Cambridge
- Church: Church of England
- Diocese: Diocese of Ely
- In office: 2014–present
- Other post: Bishop-designate of Brixworth (Peterborough)

Orders
- Ordination: 2000 (deacon); 2001 (priest)

Personal details
- Born: Alexander James Hughes; 3 October 1975 (age 50) Honiara, Solomon Islands
- Denomination: Anglican
- Spouse: Sarah (m. 1998)
- Children: Two
- Education: Priory School, Lewes; Eton College
- Alma mater: Greyfriars, Oxford; Westcott House, Cambridge; St Edmund's College, Cambridge

Alexander James Hughes (born 3 October 1975) is a British priest in the Church of England. Since 2014, he has been the Archdeacon of Cambridge. In May 2026, it was announced that he would be the next Bishop of Brixworth.

== Early life and education ==
Alex Hughes was born in Honiara, the Solomon Islands, to John and Jill Hughes. He grew up in Southampton and Seaford, England, and was educated at Lewes Priory and Eton College. He studied theology at Greyfriars, Oxford, then a Permanent Private Hall of the University of Oxford, and graduated with a Bachelor of Arts (BA) degree in 1997. He then entered Westcott House, Cambridge to train for ordained ministry. During his training, he also undertook a Master of Philosophy (MPhil) degree in theology and religious studies at St Edmund's College, Cambridge, graduating in 1999. He later undertook a Doctor of Philosophy (PhD) degree in the Faculty of Divinity, University of Cambridge, which he completed in 2011 with a doctoral thesis titled "The gospel of divine action: Oliver Chase Quick and the quest for a Christocentric metaphysic".

== Ordained ministry ==
Hughes was ordained in the Church of England as a deacon in 2000 and a priest in 2001. He served his curacy at Holy Trinity, Headington Quarry, Oxford. In 2003, he moved to the Diocese of Portsmouth, where he was Chaplain to Kenneth Stevenson, Anglican Bishop of Portsmouth, then parish priest at St Luke's and St Peter's in Somerstown, Portsmouth. Since 2014, he has been Archdeacon of Cambridge in the Diocese of Ely and an honorary canon of Ely Cathedral.

On 8 May 2026, it was announced that he would be the next Bishop of Brixworth, a suffragan bishop in the Diocese of Peterborough. He was formally nominated on 1 June 2026, and will be consecrated as a bishop in July 2026.

== Personal life ==
In 1998, Hughes married Sarah. She is a psychotherapist. They have two sons.

== Selected works ==
- Hughes, Alexander J. (2016). Oliver Quick and the quest for a Christian metaphysic. London; New York: Routledge. ISBN 978-1472452504.

Church of England titles
Preceded by John Beer	Archdeacon of Cambridge; 2014–present	Incumbent
