= Albert Robinson (priest) =

Anglican priest (1863–1948)

Albert Gossage Robinson (12 November 1863 - 13 September 1948) was an Anglican priest, most notably Archdeacon of Surrey from 1908 to 1922.

== Life and career ==
Albert Robinson was born in Wellingborough, Northamptonshire, in 1863 and was educated at Lord Williams's School, Thame, Oxfordshire. He obtained a B.A. in mathematics at Cambridge University and was a scholar at Christ's College. He was ordained deacon in December 1887 and became a priest in June 1889. He served his first curacy at St Cuthbert's Church, Darlington, County Durham. He served further curacies at Rownhams, Hampshire (1889-90) and Meole Brace, Shropshire (1890-95).

He was appointed rector of Toft-with-Calcot, Cambridgeshire in 1895 and served as rector of Busbridge, Surrey from 1898 to 1905. He served as vicar of Ryde, Isle of Wight, from 1905 to 1908.

Robinson was Archdeacon of Surrey from 1908 to 1922 and Canon of Winchester Cathedral from 1908 to 1933. He was Lady Margaret's Preacher at the University of Cambridge in October 1918. He was elected a Proctor in Convocation for the Diocese of Winchester in 1924, served as Pro-prolocutor of the Lower House of Convocation and was a Cathedral Commissioner. Robinson died in Salisbury on 13 September 1948.

== Family ==
Albert Gossage Robinson was born to Joseph Henry Robinson, a Northamptonshire ironmaster, and Mary Ann (née Gossage) on 12 November 1863 in Wellingborough.

In November 1896, Albert Robinson married Edith Sidebotham (d. 1941), the daughter of the vicar of St Thomas-on-the-Bourne, Farnham, Surrey. The couple had met in 1889, while he was curate at Rownhams. Their children, three sons and a daughter, included the economist, Austin Robinson, and the Anglican bishop, Christopher Robinson.

Church of England titles
Preceded by John Sutton Utterton	Archdeacon of Surrey; 1908–1922	Succeeded by Lionel Edward Blackburne
