= Archdeacon of Surrey =

Church of England ecclesiastical office

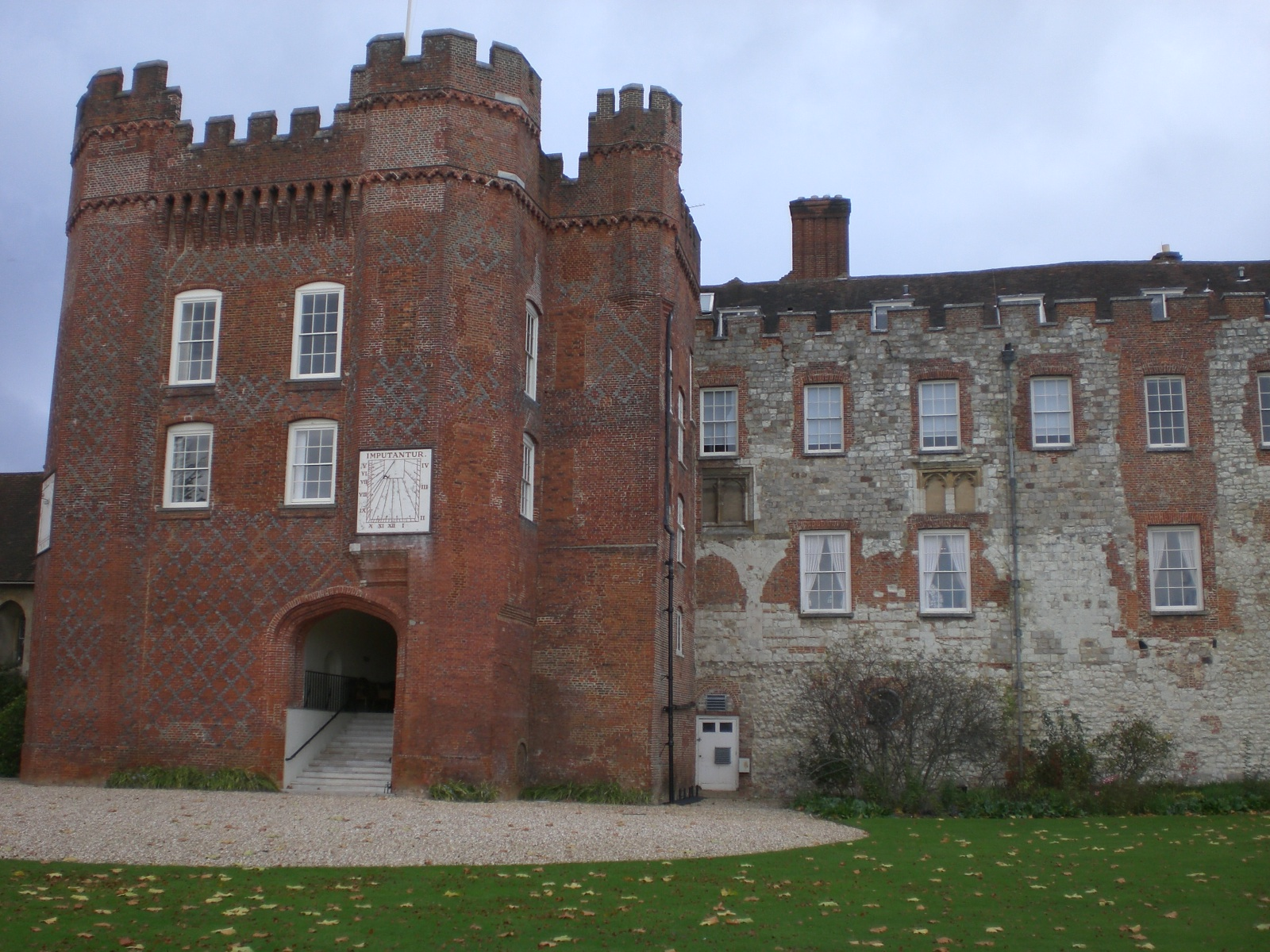
Bishop's Palace, Farnham Castle

The Archdeaconry of Surrey is the ecclesiastical officer in charge of the archdeaconry of Surrey, a subdivision of the Church of England Diocese of Guildford in the Province of Canterbury.

== History ==
The whole archdeaconry was historically in the diocese of Winchester; the bishop of Winchester had a principal residence at Farnham Castle in Surrey. So the archdeacon was also rector of St Andrew's Church, Farnham and used Farnham as a centre from which to administer the churches in the area.

On 1 May 1927 it was separated from the diocese of Winchester and became the diocese of Guildford. On 17 August 1928, the archdeaconry of Dorking was formed out of the archdeaconry of Surrey by Order in Council. Today Surrey has those same two archdeaconries.

The archdeaconry of Surrey is further subdivided into deaneries: Aldershot, Cranleigh, Farnham, Godalming, Guildford and Surrey Heath.

== List of archdeacons ==
=== High Medieval ===
Junior archdeacons in the Diocese of Winchester

- bef. 1107–aft. 1128: Stephen
- bef. 1148–aft. 1148: William

Archdeacons of Surrey

- bef. 1158–aft. 1158: Ralph
- bef. 1159–aft. 1178: Robert de Inglesham (also Archdeacon of Gloucester, bef. 1187–aft. 1190)
- bef. 1192–aft. 1215: Amicius
- bef. 1215–aft. 1216: Peter
- bef. 1238–aft. 1205: Geoffrey
- bef. 1228–aft. 1243: Luke
- bef. 1245–1258 (res.): Walter Branscombe (became Bishop of Exeter)
- bef. June–June 1258 (abd.): Peter de Sancto Mauro (left England)
- 20 January 1259–bef. May 1261 (deprived): Oliver de Tracy (deprived by the pope)
- aft. June 1262–18 March 1264 (deprived): Richard de Sancto Gorono (deprived by the pope)
- 18 March 1264–aft. 1295: Peter de Sancto Mauro (restored by the pope)
- 11 November 1296–bef. 1301 (d.): Thomas de Skerning

=== Late Medieval ===
- 12 March 1301–aft. 1317: Philip de Barton
- 10 April 1320–bef. 1347 (d.): William Inge
- 1347–bef. 1351 (res.): Richard Vaghan
- 1350: Raymond Pelegrini (mistaken appointment)
- 9 October 1351–bef. 1397 (d.): John de Edington
- 17 July 1397–bef. 1410 (d.): John Campeden
- 12 November 1410 – 27 April 1414 (res.): John Catterick (became Bishop of St David's)
- 13 August 1414–aft. 1429: John Forrest
- bef. 1446–1447 (res.): John De la Bere (became Bishop of St David's)
- 5 January 1448–aft. 1478: John Waynflete or Paten
- ?–bef. 1482 (res.): Lionel Woodville (became Bishop of Salisbury)
- 31 March 1482 – 1500 (d.): Oliver Dynham
- 16 May 1500–aft. 1502: Christopher Bainbridge (Dean of York from 1503)
- bef. 1509–aft. 1512: Matthew Long
- ?–22 March 1519 (res.): John Fox
- 27 March 1519 – 28 November 1521 (d.): William Rokeby, Archbishop of Dublin
- 13 May 1522 – 1530 (res.): John Stokesley (became Bishop of London)
- 14 July 1530 – 1531 (res.): Edward Lee (became Archbishop of York)
- December 1531–18 December 1555 (exch.): Thomas Baghe

=== Early modern ===
- 18 December 1556–bef. 1559 (deprived): Edmund Mervin (deprived)
- 16 November 1559 – 13 February 1573 (res.): John Watson (became Dean of Winchester)
- 13 February 1573–bef. 1574 (res.): Valentine Dale
- 23 July 1574–bef. 1580 (res.): William Wickham
- 11 March 1580–bef. 1605 (d.): James Cottington
- 18 October 1605 – 1616 (res.): Arthur Lake (became Bishop of Bath and Wells)
- 7 February 1617 – 2 April 1649 (d.): George Hakewill
- 1649–1660: Vacant (English Interregnum)
- 4 September 1660 – 16 July 1686 (d.): John Pearson (also Bishop of Chester from 1672)
- 23 July 1686–bef. 1689 (d.): Richard Oliver
- 20 September 1689 – 3 June 1710 (d.): Thomas Sayer
- 7 June 1710 – 1716 (res.): Edmund Gibson (became Bishop of Lincoln)
- 25 February 1716 – 1719 (res.): Hugh Boulter (became Bishop of Bristol)
- 12 December 1719 – 21 May 1725 (d.): Samuel Billingsley
- 31 May 1725 – 17 February 1753 (d.): Richard Furney
- 27 February 1753 – 25 September 1760 (d.): Thomas Thackeray
- 10 November 1760 – 9 March 1766 (d.): Thomas Ridding
- 17 March 1766 – 1769 (res.): Newton Ogle (became Dean of Winchester)
- 13 November 1769 – 1 April 1782 (res.): John Butler (also Bishop of Oxford from 1777)
- 2 April 1782 – 1 August 1814 (d.): John Carver
- 15 August 1814 – 8 September 1839 (d.): Thomas de Grey (Lord Walsingham from 1831)
- 20 November 1839–bef. 1845 (res.): Samuel Wilberforce (became Dean of Westminster)
- 21 May 1845 – 15 October 1847 (d.): William Dealtry
- 16 November 1847 – 30 November 1859 (res.): Charles Hoare

=== Late modern ===
- aft. 1859–21 December 1879 (d.): John Utterton, Rector of Farnham, Bishop suffragan of Guildford (from 1874; father of Frank)
- 1880–9 March 1888 (d.): Peter Atkinson, Vicar of Dorking
- 1888–4 June 1906 (d.): John Sapte, Rector of Cranleigh
- 1906–19 April 1908 (d.): Frank Utterton, Vicar of Leatherhead (until 1907; son of John)
- 1908–1922 (res.): Albert Robinson, canon treasurer
- 1922–1936 (res.): Lionel Blackburne, Vicar of St Mark's, Portsmouth (until 1923), then Rector of Puttenham (1926–1927; became Dean of Ely)

In 1927, the Diocese of Guildford was erected, consisting of this archdeaconry.
In 1928, the archdeaconry of Dorking was split from Surrey archdeaconry.

- 1936–1949 (ret.): Cyril Golding-Bird, Assistant Bishop (previously Archdeacon of Dorking)
- 1949–1955 (ret.): Andrew Ritchie
- October 1955–23 July 1957 (d.): Geoffry Smith
- 1957–1968 (ret.): Augustine Studdert, Rector of Busbridge (afterwards archdeacon emeritus)
- 1968–1980 (ret.): John Evans
- 1980–1989 (res.): Paul Barber (became Bishop suffragan of Brixworth)
- 1989–1995 (res.): John Went (became Bishop suffragan of Tewkesbury)
- 1996–2005 (res.): Bob Reiss
- 9 October 2005 – 19 September 2017 (ret.): Stuart Beake
- 10 December 2017 – 29 September 2023: Paul Davies (became Bishop of Dorking)
- 17 March 2024 – present: Catharine Mabuza

== Sources ==
- Greenway, Diana E. (1971), Fasti Ecclesiae Anglicanae 1066–1300, vol. 2, pp. 91–92
- Greenway, Diana E. (1971), Fasti Ecclesiae Anglicanae 1066–1300, vol. 2, pp. 94–95
- Jones, B. (1963), Fasti Ecclesiae Anglicanae 1300–1541, vol. 4, pp. 48–49
- Horn, Joyce M. (1974), Fasti Ecclesiae Anglicanae 1541–1857, vol. 3, pp. 88–89
- Edward Wedlake Brayley (1841), A Topographical History of Surrey
