= Bob Reiss (priest) =

Anglican priest and author

Canon Robert Paul "Bob" Reiss (20 January 1943 – 26 January 2023) was an Anglican priest and author.

== Biography ==
Bob Reiss was born on 20 January 1943. His parents, Paul Reiss and Beryl née Bryant, were not church attendees. He was educated at Haberdashers' Aske's Boys' School, where took A levels in maths, physics and chemistry, whilst teaching himself A-level divinity. He was confirmed in the Church of England at the age of 17.

Reiss studied Theology at Trinity College, Cambridge before training for ordination at Westcott House, Cambridge. He became a deacon in 1969, and priest in 1970. He served as curate at St John's Wood, London, until 1973. He then spent six months at Rajshahi, Bangladesh as an assistant missioner. He then return to his old college as chaplain. Whilst serving as chaplain, he met his wife Dixie, whom he married in 1985. His daughter, the playwright, Anya Reiss, was born in 1991.

He left Cambridge in 1978 to become selection secretary for the Advisory Council for the Church's Ministry (ACCM) and, from 1986 to 1996, he was team rector of Grantham. He was appointed to the General Synod in 1990 and was a member for 15 years. In May 1995, he abseiled down the west face of St Wulfram's Church tower to raise money for the church's 2000 AD appeal.

Reiss was Archdeacon of Surrey from 1996 to 2005 and canon treasurer of Westminster Abbey from 2005 until 2013.

Following his retirement in 2013, Reiss was awarded a Lambeth doctorate for his PhD thesis, entitled The Testing of Vocation: 100 years of ministry selection in the Church of England, based partly on his experiences at the ACCM. The thesis was published later the same year as a book with the same title.

Reiss died on 26 January 2023, shortly after his 80th birthday.

== Works ==
- Reiss, Robert (2013). The Testing of Vocation: 100 years of ministry selection in the Church of England. London: Church House Publishing. ISBN 978-0-71-514332-2.
- Reiss, Robert (2016). Sceptical Christianity: Exploring Credible Belief. London: Jessica Kingsley Publishers. ISBN 978-1-78-592062-2.
- Reiss, Robert (2022). Death, Where is Your Sting? Dying and Death Examined. Winchester: Christian Alternative. ISBN 978-1-78-904247-4.

Church of England titles
Preceded by John Went	Archdeacon of Surrey; 1996–2005	Succeeded by Stuart Beake
