= Geoffry Smith =

Anglican priest (1889–1957)

Geoffry Bertram Smith (28 June 1889 – 23 July 1957) was an Anglican priest, most notably Archdeacon of Surrey from 1955 until his death.

Smith was educated at Blundell's School. He entered Britannia Royal Naval College in 1904; and retired with the rank of Captain. He trained for the priesthood at Westcott House, Cambridge and began his ecclesiastical career with a curacy at Headley, Hampshire. He was a Chaplain in the RNVR during World War II. He was Vicar of Tilford, Surrey from 1945 to 1955; and Rural Dean of Farnham, Surrey from 1954 to 1955.

Church of England titles
Preceded by Andrew Binny Ritchie	Archdeacon of Surrey; 1955–1957	Succeeded by Augustine John de Clare Studdert
