= Alison White (bishop) =

British Anglican bishop (born 1956)

The Right Reverend Alison White
- Bishop of Hull
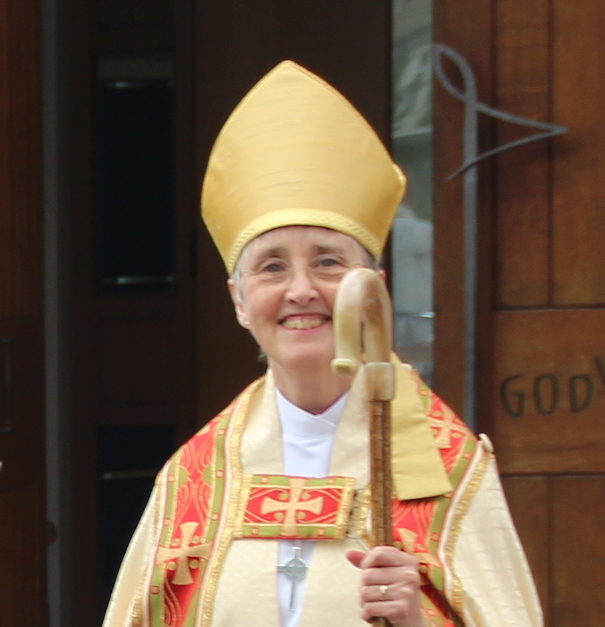
- White in 2021
- Church: Church of England
- Diocese: Diocese of York
- In office: July 2015 to 2022
- Predecessor: Richard Frith
- Successor: Eleanor Sanderson

Orders
- Ordination: 1986 (deaconess); 1987 (deacon); 1994 (priest)
- Consecration: 3 July 2015 by John Sentamu

Personal details
- Born: Alison Mary Dumbell; 1956 (age 69–70)
- Denomination: Anglicanism
- Spouse: Frank White
- Education: St Aidan's College, Durham University; Leeds University; Cranmer Hall, Durham

Alison Mary White (née Dumbell; born 1956) is a British retired Anglican bishop. She was the Bishop of Hull, a suffragan bishopric in the Diocese of York, from 2015 to 2022. She was the second woman to be consecrated as a bishop in the Church of England.

== Early life ==
White was born in 1956. Her father was Keith Dumbell (1922–2018), a virologist known for his work on smallpox. She studied English at St Aidan's College, Durham University and graduated with a Bachelor of Arts (BA) degree in 1978. She later studied at the University of Leeds and graduated with a Master of Arts (MA) degree in 1994.

== Ordained ministry ==
In 1983, White entered Cranmer Hall, an Anglican theological college attached to St John's College, Durham. She became a deaconess in 1986. She was ordained deacon in 1987 and priest in 1994. She was a non-stipendiary minister in Chester le Street from 1986 to 1989; the Diocese of Durham's Adviser in Local Mission from 1989 to 1993; Director of Pastoral Studies at Cranmer Hall from 1993 to 1998; Director of Ordinands from 1998 to 2000; its Springboard Missioner from 2000 to 2004; and Adult Education Officer for the Diocese of Peterborough from 2005 to 2010.

White was a canon of Peterborough Cathedral from 2009 to 2010. In that year she became the priest-in-charge of St James' Church, Riding Mill, Northumberland, and adviser to the Diocese of Newcastle for spirituality and spiritual direction.

=== Episcopal ministry ===
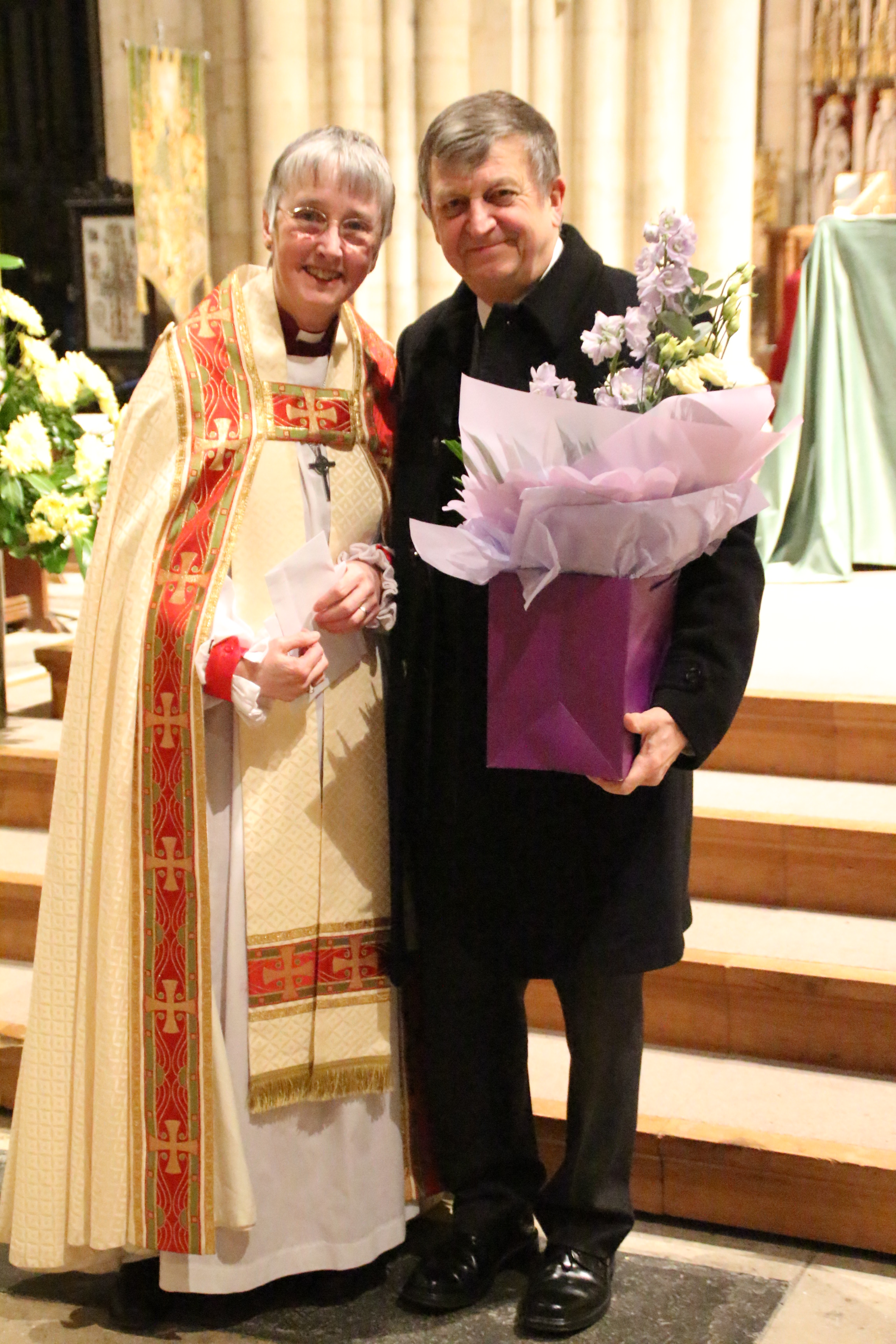
Alison (left) with husband Frank White during her farewell service at York Minster, February 2022

In March 2015, it was announced that White was to become the next Bishop of Hull. On 3 July 2015, she was consecrated as a bishop by John Sentamu, Archbishop of York, during a service at York Minster. She was the second woman to become a bishop in the Church of England; Libby Lane was the first. She was welcomed as Bishop of Hull on 6 July during a service at Holy Trinity Church, Hull.

In September 2021, it was announced that White would be retiring as Bishop of Hull effective 25 February 2022.

== Personal life ==
In 1982, the then Alison Dumbell married Frank White. He was also a priest and then bishop in the Church of England and ended his ecclesiastical career as the Assistant Bishop of Newcastle. They are the first husband and wife both to be bishops.
