= HMS Ranger (1787) =

Brig of the Royal Navy

History

Great Britain
- Name: Rose
- Launched: 1776
- Acquired: 1787 by purchase
- Renamed: Ranger by Royal Navy
- Honours and awards: Naval General Service Medal with clasp "1 June 1794"
- Captured: 11 June 1794

France
- Name: Ranger
- Acquired: 11 June 1794 by capture
- Captured: 15 October 1797

Great Britain
- Name: HMS Venturer
- Acquired: 15 October 1797 and again 6 November 1797
- Fate: Sold February 1803

General characteristics
- Displacement: 180 tons (French)
- Tons burthen: 1955/94 (bm)
- Length: 74 ft 7 1/4 in (22.7 m) (overall); 56 ft 0 5/8 in (17.1 m) (keel)
- Beam: 25 ft 7 in (7.8 m)
- Depth of hold: 9 ft 5 in (2.9 m)
- Propulsion: Sails
- Sail plan: Schooner
- Complement: British service:55; French service:107
- Armament: British service: 12 × 4-pounder guns; French service: 16 × 4-pounder guns + 6 × swivel guns

HMS Ranger was the 14-gun revenue cutter Rose, launched in 1776, that the Royal Navy purchased in 1787, and that the French captured in 1794. The British recaptured her (twice) in 1797 and renamed her HMS Venturer (or Venturier). The Navy sold her in 1803.

== Naval cutter ==
The Royal Navy purchased Rose on 2 January 1787. The Navy commissioned Rose as Ranger in April 1787 under the command of Lieutenant Samuel Featherstone, for Portland and the Start. In 1788 Ranger was fitted for foreign service at Portsmouth, but was paid off the next year. Then in 1790, she was fitted for Channel service. In November 1791 Lieutenant Isaac Cotgrave commissioned Ranger for the Channel.

== Capture ==
Ranger, under Cotgrave's command, was part of Admiral Lord Howe's British Channel Fleet at the battle of the Glorious First of June. As a cutter and thus one of the support vessels there, she did not participate in the battle itself, and so suffered no casualties. Still, in 1847 when the Admiralty authorized the issue of the Naval General Service Medal with clasp "1 June 1794", the surviving claimants from Ranger's crew, if any, were included.

Ranger was cruising in the Channel when on 11 June 1794 she encountered the French frigate Railleuse off Brest. Ranger engaged in some proforma resistance and then struck. The French treated Ranger's crew badly, stripping the men naked and keeping them in the open for two days until they arrived at Brest. The court martial on 11 September for the loss of the vessel acquitted Cotgrave. He then testified as to the treatment he and his crew had received. During the day they were kept naked on the gangway, in the rain. At night they were kept in the hold. When they arrived at Brest they were given some clothes before being landed. The French captain reportedly announced to his prisoners "that was the way he would treat all English slaves."

The French Navy took Ranger into service and kept her name.

== French service ==
Between June and July 1795 at Lorient, the French re-rigged Ranger as a brig.

Lloyd's List reported that the "Ranger National Corvette, of 16 Guns" had captured two vessels on 24 August, Providence, Caughy, master, which had been sailing from Belfast to Jamaica, and Somme, of Dartmouth, which had been sailing from Viana to Newfoundland. Ranger burned Providence, but returned Somme to her crew, who brought her into Cork. Then on 8 September Ranger captured Supply, Meriton, master, as she was sailing from Martinique to London. However, the people left on board recaptured Supply from the prize crew and sailed her to New York. Next, Ranger captured and burned Betsy and Brother, which had been sailing from Norfolk to Dublin.

Then in June or July 1796, Ranger captured and burned Britannia, Ford, master, which had been sailing from Liverpool to Newfoundland. Around 15 September Ranger, under the command of enseigne de vaisseau Hulin (later lieutenant de vaisseau), carried diplomatic correspondence from Brest to the United States. By 22 May 1797 Ranger was returning from New York to Brest. Next she cruised in the Atlantic.

== Captures and recaptures ==
On 15 October 1797 Ranger was in the roads of the Canary Islands where she had the misfortune to encounter HMS Indefatigable. Indefatigable captured the "National Brig Corvette Ranger", of 14 guns and 70 men. Ranger had been carrying dispatches to the West Indies, but was able to destroy them before the British came on board.

About two weeks after Indefatigable had captured Ranger, on 2 November the French privateer Vengeance recaptured Ranger. Four days later Galatea re-recaptured Ranger off the Gironde. There being a Ranger already in service, when the Royal Navy took Galatea's prize back into service they gave her the name HMS Venturer. (Note: A number of references to the capture give Ranger's name as Venturier, suggesting that the French may have renamed her at some point. For example, the Naval Chronicle, in a chronological listing of the vessels of the Royal Navy, gives her name as Venturier, rather than Venturer.)

== HMS Venturer ==
Venturer arrived at Plymouth on 9 August 1798, some nine months after her recapture. She underwent fitting between January and April 1799. The Royal Navy recommissioned her under Lieutenant Daniel Burwood. In April 1802 Lieutenant Robert Jump replaced Burwood. In November he sailed Venturer to Gibraltar.

== Fate ==
Venturer was paid off in Gibraltar in January 1803. She was sold by Admiralty Order on 10 February.
