= Keith Dumbell =

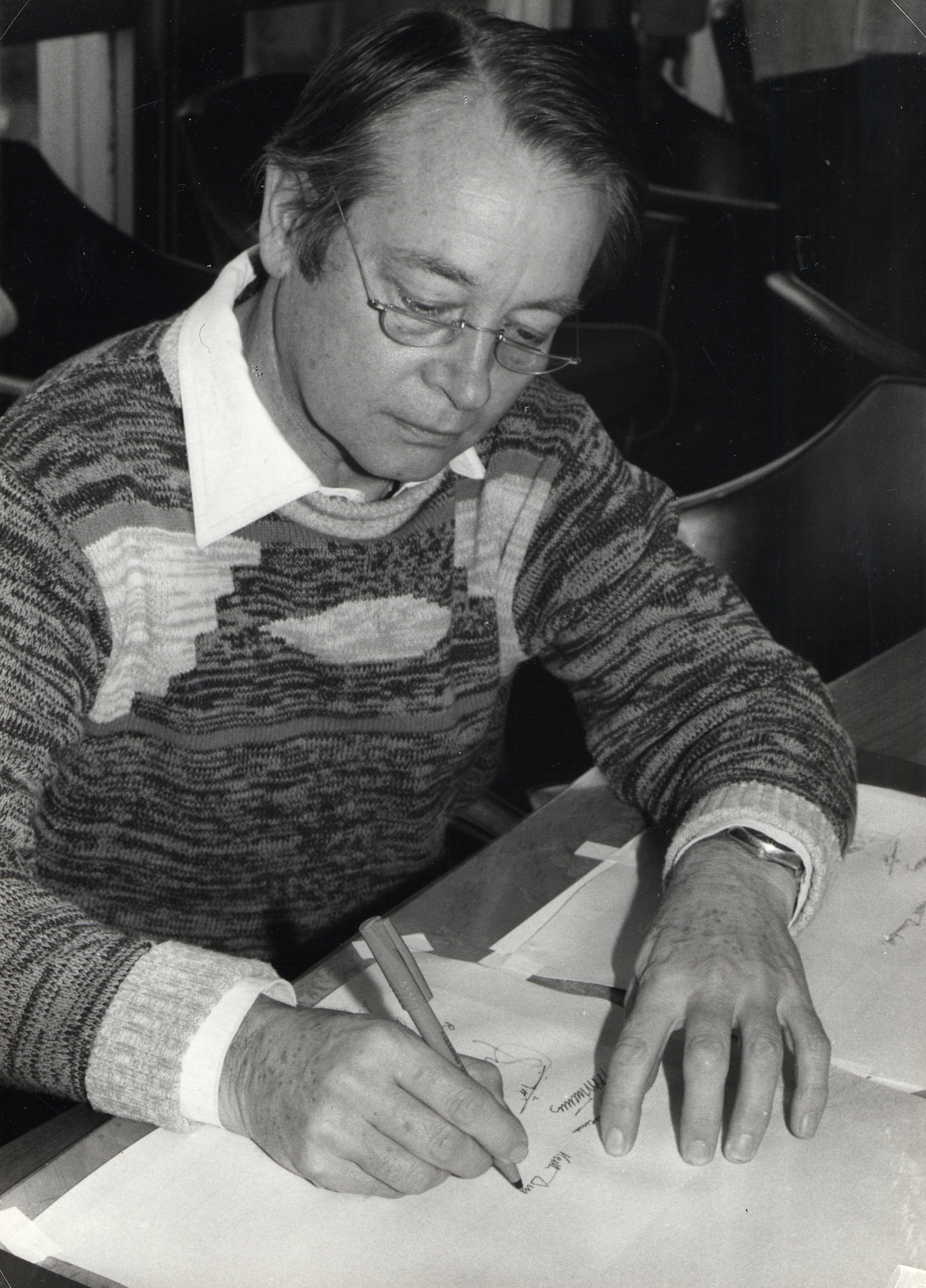
- Dumbell in December 1979 signing the WHO parchment certifying the eradication of smallpox
- Born: 2 October 1922; Liverpool, England
- Died: 27 May 2018 (aged 95); Cape Town, South Africa
- Education: University of Liverpool
- Occupations: Microbiologist, professor
- Spouse: Susan Herd
- Children: 4

Keith Rodney Dumbell (2 October 1922 – 27 May 2018) was a British virologist who worked on research and eradication of smallpox.

== Early life and education ==
Dumbell was born in Liverpool and gained his medical degree in 1944 from the University of Liverpool. Shortly after graduation, he began to work with smallpox expert Allan Watt Downie in the Department of Bacteriology at the University of Liverpool. Dumbell's early aptitude for research resulted in the publication of his first paper with Downie in 1947, describing the cultivation of the smallpox virus on the chorioallantoic membrane of hen's eggs.

== Career ==
Dumbell was head of the Virology Department at St Mary's Hospital, London, and on this position one of the key international experts on smallpox. He was head of the WHO Collaborating Centre for Poxvirus Research at the St Mary's Hospital between 1969 and 1981. He was a member of the Global Commission and several expert groups on poxvirus infections. He used the gene cloning technique to copy fragments of smallpox viral DNA into bacteria, where they could be safely archived and studied later.

Following the 1978 smallpox outbreak in the United Kingdom, Dumbell served as an expert witness. Following the outbreak, the British Government ordered transfer of Dumbell's British collection of smallpox strains from the St Mary's Hospital Medical School to the Centre for Applied Microbiology in Porton Down.

Dumbell was among the signatories of the Declaration of global eradication of smallpox on 8 May 1980. Following the Declaration, World Health Organization ordered consolidation of virus strain collections worldwide into two high-secure (BSL-4) facilities in the United States and Russia and destruction of the remaining unneeded samples. Dumbell personally escorted the shipment of British sample collection into the CDC center in Atlanta.

== Retirement and death ==
After the death of his first wife, Dumbell remarried a South African woman and moved to Cape Town, South Africa, in the mid-1980s. He joined the University of Cape Town, where he retired. As a Professor Emeritus of medical virology, he gave advice to post-graduate students.

Dumbell died in Cape Town on 27 May 2018, aged 95, from natural causes. He was interred on 6 June 2018.

== Personal life ==
In 1950, Dumbell married Brenda Margaret Heathcote. Together they had two daughters, including Alison White. a Church of England bishop. Brenda died in 1971, and the following year Dumbell married Susan Herd. Together they had two sons.
