= Andrew Ritchie (priest) =

Scottish Anglican priest (1880–1956)

Andrew Binny Ritchie (born Edinburgh, 1880; died Wonersh, 1956) was an Anglican priest, most notably Archdeacon of Surrey from 1949 to 1955.

Ritchie was educated at Edinburgh Academy, followed by Durham University (Hatfield College) and Wells Theological College.

Ritchie was ordained priest in 1905, having been made a deacon in 1904. He was curate at Stratford Bow (1904–1910) and at Eaton Square (1910–1914). He was vicar of St Frideswide, Poplar from 1914 to 1918; Rector of All Saints', Poplar and Rural Dean of Poplar from 1918 to 1920.

He later served as rector of Sudborough from 1920 to 1922; rector of St Mary Chester from 1922 to 1925; vicar of St John, Margate from 1925 to 1931; vicar of Kennington from 1931 to 1934; vicar of Cranbrook from 1934 to 1939; Vicar of St Mary, Dover from 1939 to 1941. His final parish post was rector of Haslemere from 1941 to 1949.

He was appointed archdeacon of Surrey in February 1949, succeeding Cyril Golding-Bird, who had held the post while also serving as assistant bishop of Guildford. Ritchie resigned for health reasons in August 1955.

He died at Parkside, Wonersh, on 20 January 1956. His funeral took place on 25 January at Holy Trinity Church, Guildford, then the pro-cathedral of the Diocese of Guildford, and was followed by a cremation service at Woking.

Church of England titles
Preceded by Cyril Golding-Bird	Archdeacon of Surrey; 1949–1955	Succeeded by Geoffry Bertram Smith
