= Richard Oliver (priest) =

Anglican priest

Richard Oliver was an Anglican priest, who served as Archdeacon of Surrey from 1686 until his death in 1689.

Oliver was born in the City of London and educated at St John's College, Oxford, graduating BA in 1673. After a curacy in Midhurst he became the Rector of Chilbolton. He became a Canon of Wells in 1684.
