= Frank White (bishop) =

English bishop (born 1949)

The Right Reverend Frank White
- Assistant Bishop of Newcastle
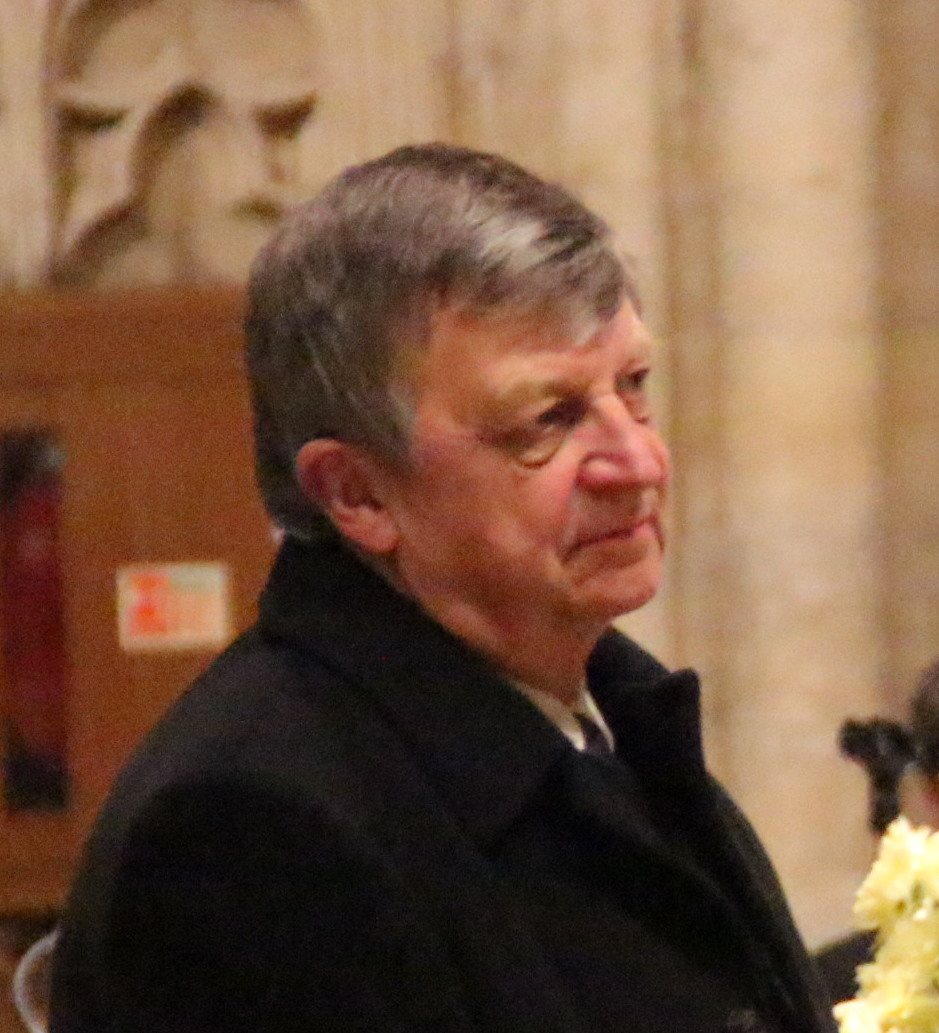
- White in 2022
- Diocese: Diocese of Newcastle
- In office: 2010–2016
- Predecessor: Paul Richardson
- Successor: Mark Tanner (as Bishop of Berwick)
- Other posts: Bishop of Brixworth (2002–2010); Acting Bishop of Newcastle (2014–2015)

Orders
- Ordination: 1980
- Consecration: 2002

Personal details
- Born: 26 May 1949 (age 77)
- Denomination: Christian (Anglican)
- Spouse: Alison White
- Profession: formerly social worker
- Education: University of Wales

Francis White (born 26 May 1949) is an English retired Anglican bishop. He was Bishop of Brixworth and then the Assistant Bishop of Newcastle in the Church of England.

== Early life ==
White was educated at University College Cardiff, after which he was a social worker for nine years.

== Ordained ministry ==
White was ordained in 1980 and was a curate at St Nicholas' Church, Durham and then hospital chaplain at the University Hospital of North Durham, vicar of Birtley, Rural Dean of Chester-le-Street and Archdeacon of Sunderland.

He has strong views on why fewer Anglicans regularly attend church.

=== Episcopal ministry ===
White was ordained to the episcopate in 2002 as the Bishop of Brixworth in the Diocese of Peterborough. For much of 2008 and 2009 he deputised for Ian Cundy, Bishop of Peterborough, before Cundy's death from cancer.

In May 2010 it was announced that White would become the Assistant Bishop of Newcastle from 28 November 2010. He retired on 30 September 2016.

== Personal life ==
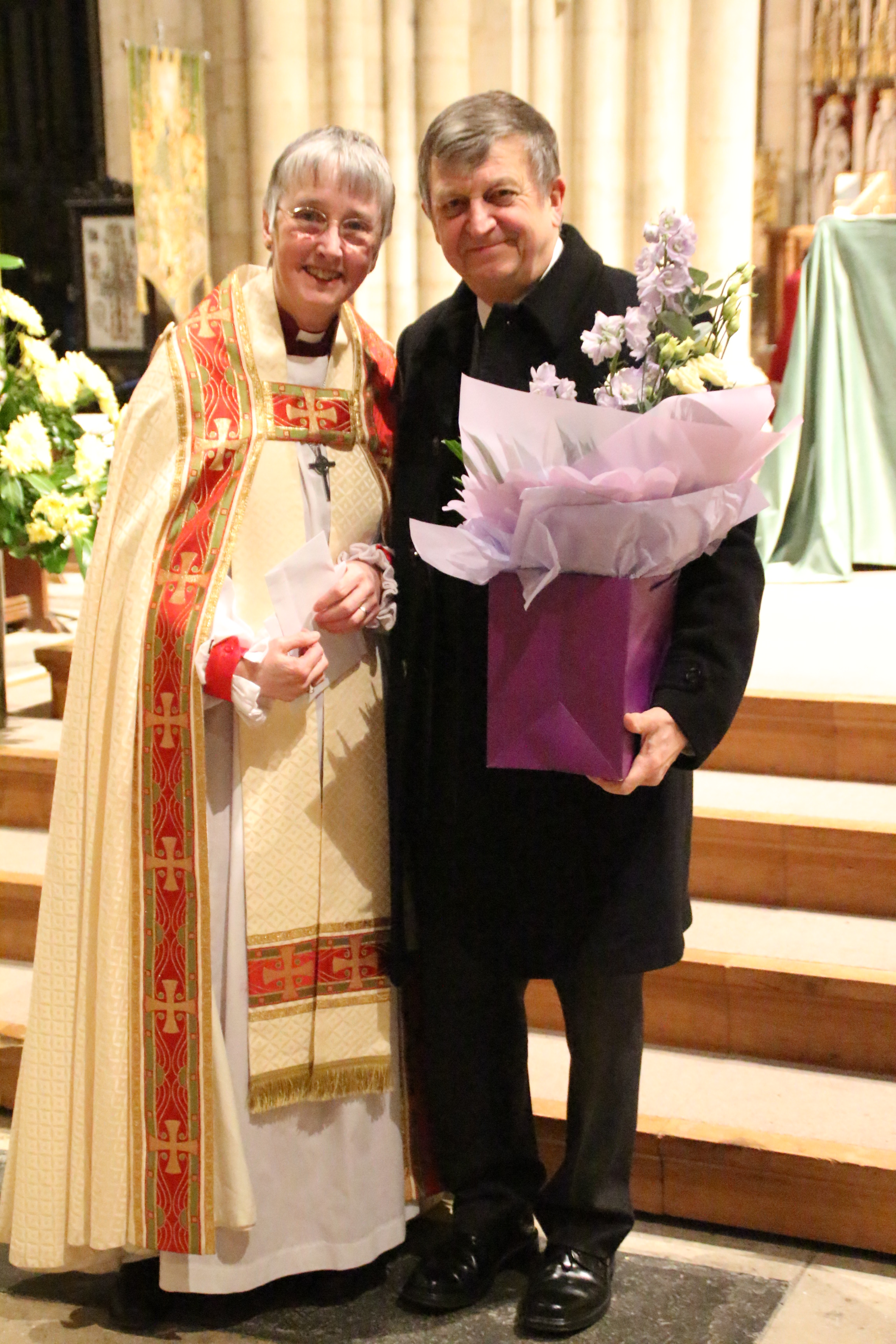
Frank (right) with wife Alison White during her farewell service at York Minster, February 2022

White is a supporter of his hometown football team, Newcastle United. He is a keen ornithologist.

White is married to Alison White, retired Bishop of Hull. They are the first husband and wife both to be bishops.

== Styles ==
- The Reverend Frank White (1980–1997)
- The Venerable Frank White (1997–2002)
- The Right Reverend Frank White (2002–present)

Church of England titles
Preceded by Paul Barber	Bishop of Brixworth; 2002–2010	Succeeded by John Holbrook
Preceded by Paul Richardson	Assistant Bishop of Newcastle; 2010–2016	Succeeded by Mark Tanner as Bishop of Berwick
