= Augustine Studdert =

20th-century Anglican priest

Augustine John de Clare Studdert (31 January 1901 – 20 March 1972) was an Anglican priest, most notably archdeacon of Surrey from 1957 to 1968.

== Career ==
Augustine Studdert was educated at Trinity College, Dublin, graduating with a B.A. in 1924 and receiving an M.A. in 1936. He was ordained deacon in 1925 and became a priest the following year.

His first curacy was at Glendermott, Northern Ireland, in 1925, but he moved later that year to St Martin-in-the-Fields, London, where he served until 1932. He spent two years as Assistant Chaplain to the British Embassy Church in Paris. He was a curate at Cranleigh, Surrey, between 1934 and 1939, and was Rector of Busbridge from 1939 to 1969.

Studdert was Rural Dean of Godalming from 1950 to 1970. He was appointed Archdeacon of Surrey in 1957. He was Examining Chaplain to the bishop of Guildford from 1961 to 1969. He tendered his resignation as archdeacon in December 1967, following a recommendation from the archbishop of Canterbury's Commission, that two archdeacons should be appointed for the Diocese of Guildford. At the request of the bishop of Guildford, he continued to serve as archdeacon of Surrey until August 1968.

Studdert died at the Holy Cross Hospital, Haslemere, on 20 March 1972. His funeral service took place at Guildford Crematorium on 24 March and a memorial service was held at Guildford Cathedral on 18 April of the same year.

== Family ==
Augustine Studdert married Marjorie Joyce Chettle on 22 April 1936 at St Nicholas' Church, Cranleigh. The couple had one son, Michael John de Clare Studdert (28 March 1939 – 9 August 2017), who was ordained deacon at Manchester Cathedral on 5 June 1966 and became a priest on 21 May the following year. Michael Studdert was convicted in 2006 for making indecent images of children and was sentenced to four years' imprisonment.

Church of England titles
Preceded by Geoffry Bertram Smith	Archdeacon of Surrey; 1957–1968	Succeeded by John Mascal Evans
