= Stuart Beake =

British Anglican priest

Stuart Alexander Beake (born 18 September 1949) is a British Anglican priest; he served as Archdeacon of Surrey from 2005 until his retirement on 19 September 2017.

He was educated at King's College School, Emmanuel College, Cambridge and Cuddesdon College, Oxford.

Church of England titles
Preceded by Bob Reiss	Archdeacon of Surrey; 2005–2017	Succeeded by Paul Davies
