= French ship Tyrannicide (1793) =

Ship of the line of the French Navy

- Scale model of Achille, sister ship of French ship Tyrannicide (1793), on display at the Musée national de la Marine in Paris.

History

France
- Name: Tyrannicide
- Namesake: "Tyrant killer"; Louis Desaix
- Builder: Lorient shipyard
- Launched: 28 June 1793
- Renamed: Dessaix 19 July 1800
- Fate: Wrecked January 1802

General characteristics
- Class & type: Téméraire-class ship of the line
- Displacement: 3,069 tonneaux
- Tons burthen: 1,537 port tonneaux
- Length: 55.87 metres (183.3 ft) (172 pied)
- Beam: 14.90 metres (48 ft 11 in)
- Draught: 7.26 metres (23.8 ft) (22 pied)
- Propulsion: Up to 2,485 m^{2} (26,750 sq ft) of sails
- Armament: 74 guns: Lower gundeck: 28 × 36-pounder long guns; Upper gundeck: 30 × 18-pounder long guns; Forecastle and Quarter deck: 16 × 8-pounder long guns; 4 × 36-pounder carronades
- Armour: Timber

Tyrannicide was a 74-gun ship of the line of the French Navy.

In 1794, under Alain Joseph Dordelin, she took part in the Glorious First of June. Along with Indomptable, she helped rescue the Montagne trapped in the midst of the British fleet.

Under Zacharie Jacques Théodore Allemand, Tyrannicide was part of Bruix's squadron from March 1799 and took part in the Cruise of Bruix.

Tyrannicide was renamed Desaix in August 1800 in honour of General Louis Desaix. Under Captain Jean-Anne Christy de la Pallière, she captured the 14-gun brig HMS Speedy, captained by Lord Cochrane, on 3 July 1801.

Desaix took part in the First Battle of Algeciras in Algeciras Bay on the coast of Spain on 6 July 1801 as part of a French squadron under the command of Charles-Alexandre Léon Durand Linois, who formed his squadron into line of battle with his ships 500 yards (460 meters) apart and his flagship, the 80-gun ship of the line Formidable, at the northern end, with Desaix behind her. As the ships of the British squadron under the command of Rear Admiral James Saumarez entered the bay, they were becalmed, and Linois ordered his ship's crews to warp their vessels into shallow water. Meanwhile, the British 74-gun third rate ship of the line HMS Venerable under Captain Samuel Hood, opened fire on Desaix at long range at 08:50. At 09:15, Saumarez's flagship, the 74-gun third rate ship of the line HMS Caesar, anchored in the bay and joined the action, also firing on Desaix. When a light breeze began to blow in from the northwest, Linois ordered his ships to sever their anchor cables and maneuver into better defensive positions close inshore, but Desaix ran aground directly in front of Algeciras during the maneuver. Desaix was one of the more badly damaged of the French ships involved in the battle, which ended in a French victory.

Desaix was refloated, repaired, and returned to service after the battle, but in January 1802 she was wrecked at Saint-Domingue while trying to enter Cap Français harbour.
