= Alain Joseph Dordelin =

French Navy officer (1764–1826)

- Born: March 13, 1764; Lorient, France
- Died: 19 May 1826 (aged 62); Lorient, France
- Military career
- Allegiance: Kingdom of France; French First Republic; First French Empire
- Branch: French Navy; French Imperial Navy
- Rank: Counter admiral
- Commands: Maritime prefect at Brest
- Conflicts: American Revolutionary War; French Revolutionary Wars; Glorious First of June; Napoleonic Wars
- Awards: Commander of the Legion of Honour; Count of the Empire

Counter-Admiral Alain Joseph Dordelin (French pronunciation: [alɛ̃ ʒozɛf dɔʁdəlɛ̃]; 13 March 1764 - 19 May 1826) was a French Navy officer who served in the French Revolutionary and Napoleonic Wars. He joined the Navy during the years of the Kingdom of France, serving in the American Revolutionary War and his career finished as a counter admiral and Count of the Empire.

== Biography ==
Born at Lorient, the son of an officer of the French Indies Company, he enlisted on a voyage to China on the ship Duras and while in the East Indies volunteered for service with the French Navy on board the ship Sévère in the squadron of Pierre André de Suffren, fighting in several actions of the American Revolutionary War. Promoted to ship-of-the-line lieutenant in 1786, he served on Dryade and in 1793 was promoted to ship-of-the-line captain in command of Tyrannicide. He fought at the Glorious First of June, and later took part in the disastrous French expedition to Ireland in the winter of 1796.

In 1799 he was promoted to counter admiral and in 1804 was made a commander of the Legion of Honor. In 1810 he was granted the office of maritime prefect at the French naval base of Brest and made a Count of the Empire. Later moving to command the squadron in the Scheldt, he retired from the French Imperial Navy in 1812.
