= Bishop of Brixworth =

Suffragan bishop in the Church of England

The Bishop of Brixworth is an episcopal title used by a suffragan bishop of the Church of England Diocese of Peterborough, in the Province of Canterbury, England. The title takes its name after the village of Brixworth in Northamptonshire and has shared responsibility (with the diocesan bishop) over the whole diocese. Following a proposal initiated by Bill Westwood, Bishop of Peterborough in 1985, and with the agreement of the General Synod of the Church of England in July 1987, the See was erected by Queen-in-Council on July 26, 1988.

It was announced in May 2026 that Venerable Alexander James Hughes would be appointed new bishop.

== List of Bishops of Brixworth ==
Bishops of Brixworth
From	Until	Incumbent	Notes
1989	2001	Paul Barber	
2002	2010	Frank White	Translated to be Assistant Bishop of Newcastle
29 June 2011	2025	John Holbrook	Retired 30 September 2025.
2026	present	Alexander Hughes	
