= John Holbrook (bishop) =

British Anglican bishop

The Right Reverend John Holbrook
- Bishop of Brixworth
- Church: Church of England
- Diocese: Diocese of Peterborough
- In office: 2011 to 2025
- Predecessor: Frank White
- Successor: TBA
- Other posts: Acting Bishop of Peterborough (2023); Acting Bishop of Leicester (2015–2016)
- Previous post: Rural Dean of Wimborne (2004–2011)

Orders
- Ordination: 1986 (deacon); 1987 (priest)
- Consecration: 2 June 2011

Personal details
- Born: 14 June 1962 (age 64)
- Denomination: Anglican
- Spouse: Elizabeth
- Children: 2
- Education: St Peter's College, Oxford

John Edward Holbrook (born 14 June 1962) is a retired Church of England bishop. He was the Bishop of Brixworth in the Diocese of Peterborough. He had been rural dean of Wimborne in the Diocese of Salisbury and later served as Acting Bishop of Leicester (of the Diocese of Leicester) and as Acting Bishop of Peterborough.

== Early life and education ==
Holbrook grew up in Bristol where he was educated at the Bristol Cathedral Choir School. As an undergraduate he studied theology at St Peter's College, Oxford, where he obtained his MA (Oxbridge MA after a BA(Hons)). He then attended theological college at Ridley Hall, Cambridge.

== Ordained ministry ==
Holbrook was made a deacon at Petertide 1986 (29 June) and ordained priest the Petertide following (5 July 1987), both times by Ronnie Bowlby, Bishop of Southwark, at Southwark Cathedral. His first ordained ministry position was as a curate at St Mary the Virgin, Barnes, London. In 1989, he moved to St Mary's Church, Bletchley as senior curate and curate-in-charge of Whaddon Way Ecumenical Church (an Anglican-Baptist local ecumenical partnership (LEP). In 1993 he became the Vicar of Adderbury with Milton and, from 2000, also the Rural Dean of Deddington.

From 2002 until 2011, Holbrook was Rector of Wimborne Minster and priest-in-charge of Witchampton, Stanbridge and Long Crichel. He also became chaplain of the South and East Dorset Primary Care Trust and, in 2004, the Rural Dean of Wimborne. From 2006, he was also an honorary canon and prebendary of Salisbury Cathedral as well as priest-in-charge of Horton, Chalbury, Hinton Martel and Holt Saint James.

=== Bishop ===
On 4 March 2011, 10 Downing Street announced Holbrook as the Bishop-designate of Brixworth in the Diocese of Peterborough, in succession to Frank White. He was consecrated as a bishop at Westminster Abbey on 2 June 2011 by Rowan Williams, Archbishop of Canterbury, and installed at Peterborough Cathedral on 29 June. He shares overall responsibility with the Bishop of Peterborough, the diocesan bishop, for the whole diocese.

On 15 May 2015 it was announced that, from 1 September, Holbrook would be part-time acting Bishop of Leicester (during a vacancy in that See), retaining his post and duties in Peterborough. He served until Martyn Snow took up his post as Bishop of Leicester.

He retired as Bishop of Brixworth on 30 September 2025, after 39 years of ordained ministry.

== Personal life ==
Holbrook is married to Elizabeth, whom he met while studying at Oxford University; she is a tax accountant. The couple have one son and one daughter.

== Styles ==
- The Reverend John Holbrook (1986–2006)
- The Reverend Canon John Holbrook (2006–2011)
- The Right Reverend John Holbrook (2011–present)

Church of England titles
Preceded by Frank White	Bishop of Brixworth; 2011–2025	TBA
