= Peter Atkinson (Archdeacon of Surrey) =

Peter Righton Atkinson (1829–1888) was Archdeacon of Surrey from 1880 until 1888

== Biography ==
He was born in York and educated at Trinity College, Cambridge. He was ordained in 1856 and began his ecclesiastical career with a curacy in Stisted.

He was promoted to Rector of rural villages, first of Pusey, Oxfordshire (1860–1868) and then of East Hendred from 1868 to 1875. He became the other form of parish priest (Vicar), traditionally mainly supported by salary rather than local income, of the growing town Dorking from 1875 to 1885 and of the populous village of Frensham from 1885 until his death on 5 March 1888. He held the office from 1880 until death of Archdeacon of Surrey.
