= Thomas Sayer =

Anglican priest (1651–1710)

Thomas Sayer (b London 6 July 1651 - d Winchester 3 June 1710) was an Anglican priest in the late 17th and early 18th centuries.

Sayer was educated at Merchant Taylors' School and St John's College, Oxford, graduating BA in 1673. Sayer was Chaplain to Peter Mews, Bishop of Winchester then Archdeacon of Surrey from 1689 until his death.
