= Paul Barber (bishop) =

Bishop of Brixworth (1935–2021)

The Right Reverend Paul Barber
- Bishop of Brixworth
- Diocese: Peterborough
- In office: 1989–2001
- Successor: Frank White
- Other posts: Honorary assistant bishop in Bath & Wells (2001–2021); Archdeacon of Surrey (1980–1989)

Orders
- Ordination: 1960 (deacon); 1961 (priest)
- Consecration: 1989

Personal details
- Born: 16 September 1935
- Died: 22 February 2021 (aged 85)
- Denomination: Anglican
- Parents: Cecil; Mollie
- Spouse: Patricia Walford (m. 1959)
- Education: St John's College, Cambridge

Paul Everard Barber (16 September 1935 – 22 February 2021) was the inaugural Bishop of Brixworth.

Barber was educated at Sherborne School and St John's College, Cambridge. After training for ordination at Wells Theological College, he was ordained in the Church of England: made deacon on Trinity Sunday 1960 (12 June), by Ivor Watkins, Bishop of Guildford, at Holy Trinity Pro-Cathedral, Guildford and ordained priest on the Trinity Sunday following (28 May 1961), by George Reindorp, Bishop of Guildford, at Guildford Cathedral. After a curacy at St Francis, Westborough he served as Vicar of Camberley with Yorktown before becoming Rural Dean of Farnham. This in turn led to his becoming Archdeacon of Surrey and finally the first Bishop of Brixworth (sole suffragan bishop of the Diocese of Peterborough). He took up that see with his consecration as bishop by Robert Runcie, Archbishop of Canterbury, on 25 January 1989 at Westminster Abbey. He retired after 12 years to Street and was an honorary assistant bishop within the Diocese of Bath and Wells (until his death) and a governor of Millfield School.

He died on 22 February 2021 in Chertsey, Surrey aged 85.

Church of England titles
New title	Bishop of Brixworth; 1989–2001	Succeeded by Frank White
