= Heywood (surname) =

Heywood is a surname. Notable people with the surname include:

- Abel Heywood (1810–1893), English politician
- Andrew Heywood, British political scientist
- Angela Heywood (1840–1935), American suffragist, socialist, abolitionist
- Anne Heywood (born 1932), British film actress
- Arthur Heywood (1849–1916), 3rd Baronet, experimental railway builder
- Arthur Heywood-Lonsdale (1835–1897), English rower and Canadian landowner
- Benjamin Heywood (1793–1865), first of the Heywood Baronets, English banker and philanthropist
- Bernard Heywood (1871–1960), English bishop
- Charles Heywood (1803–1853), American naval officer
- Charles Heywood (1839–1915), American general, son of the above
- Charles D. Heywood (1881–1957), American businessman
- Doug Heywood (1924–2002), Australian footballer
- Eddie Heywood (1915–1989), American jazz musician
- Ezra Heywood (1829–1893), American radical
- Frances Heywood (1902–1994) British metallurgist and engineer
- George Heywood (1907–1985), English footballer
- Herbert Heywood (footballer) (1913–unknown), English footballer
- Herbert Heywood (actor)
- Hugh Heywood (1896–1987), Anglican priest
- Jamie Heywood (born 1966), American engineer
- James Heywood (philanthropist) (1810–1897), British politician
- Jasper Heywood (1535–1598), English scholar and translator
- Jean Heywood (1921–2019), British actress
- Jeff Heywood (born 1951), United States racing driver
- Jeremy Heywood (1961–2018), British civil servant
- Joanne Heywood, British actress
- John Heywood, 16th century English writer
- John B. Heywood (photographer), 19th century American photographer
- John B. Heywood, engineer
- John D. Heywood, 19th century American photographer
- Joseph L. Heywood (1815–1910), American Mormon bishop
- Joseph Lee Heywood (1837–1876), victim of bank robbery
- Matthew Heywood (born 1979), English footballer
- Neil Heywood (1970–2011), British businessman murdered in China
- Oliver Heywood (1825–1892), English banker and philanthropist
- Oliver Heywood (minister) (1630–1702), English nonconformist minister
- Pat Heywood (born 1927), British actress
- Paul Heywood, British academic
- Peter Heywood (1772–1831), British naval officer
- Phil Heywood, American musician
- Ralph Heywood (1921–2007), American football player and marine
- Richard Heywood (bishop) (1867–1955), Anglican bishop
- Richard Heywood (MP) (by 1520 – 1570)
- Samuel Heywood (Berkeley) (1833–1903), American businessman
- Samuel Heywood (chief justice) (1753–1828), British lawyer
- Samuel R. Heywood (1821–1913), American businessman
- Stephen Heywood (1969–2006), American architect and ALS campaigner
- Suzanne Heywood (born 1969), British business executive
- Thomas Heywood (died 1641), English actor and playwright
- Thomas Heywood (railway engineer) (died 1953) British locomotive engineer
- Thomas Percival Heywood (1823–1897), 2nd Baronet
- Thomas Heywood (antiquarian) (1797–1866), English member of the Chetham Society
- Tim Heywood (1914–2006), British soldier and farmer
- Vernon Heywood (1927–2022), British botanist
