= Mary Sumner =

British educator and activist (1828–1921)

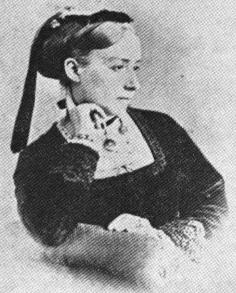
- Born: Mary Elizabeth Heywood; 31 December 1828; Near Swinton, Lancashire, UKGBI
- Died: 11 August 1921 (aged 92); Winchester, Hampshire, UKGBI
- Resting place: Winchester Cathedral
- Known for: Founder of the Mothers' Union
- Spouse: George Sumner (m. 1848; died 1909)
- Children: 3, including Heywood Sumner
- Father: Thomas Heywood
- Relatives: Benedict Humphrey Sumner (grandson); Benjamin Heywood (uncle); James Heywood (uncle); Thomas Percival (grandfather); Charles Sumner (father-in-law)
- Family: Sumner family

Mary Elizabeth Sumner (née Heywood: 31 December 1828 – 11 August 1921) was a British educator and activist, known for founding the Mothers' Union. Sumner is commemorated in a number of provinces of the Anglican Communion on 9 August.

== Early life and family ==
Sumner was born Mary Elizabeth Heywood on 31 December 1828 at her mother's family home near Swinton to Thomas Heywood, an antiquarian and banker, and Mary Elizabeth Sumner (née Barton; died 1870). Sumner was the paternal granddaughter of the physician Thomas Percival and the niece of Benjamin Heywood, a banker, and James Heywood, a politician, university reformer, and philanthropist.

In 1832 (Note: Also cited as 1833.), Sumner's father retired from the family bank and the family moved to the Hope End Estate. The youngest of three siblings (Note: Sumner is also cited as having a younger brother who died in infancy.), Sumner was taught literature, mathematics, music and foreign languages at home by governesses and her parents. Showing a talent for music, Sumner's father bought her an organ and arranged for her to take singing lessons in Rome, who suggested that she pursue a career in opera.

On 1 January 1847, Sumner met her future husband George Sumner, the future Bishop of Guildford and member of the Sumner family, in Rome. Sumner later married George Sumner in Colwall on 26 July 1848. The couple had three children, the youngest of whom was the artist and archaeologist Heywood Sumner. Sumner was the grandmother of the historian Benedict Humphrey Sumner.

== Mothers' Union ==
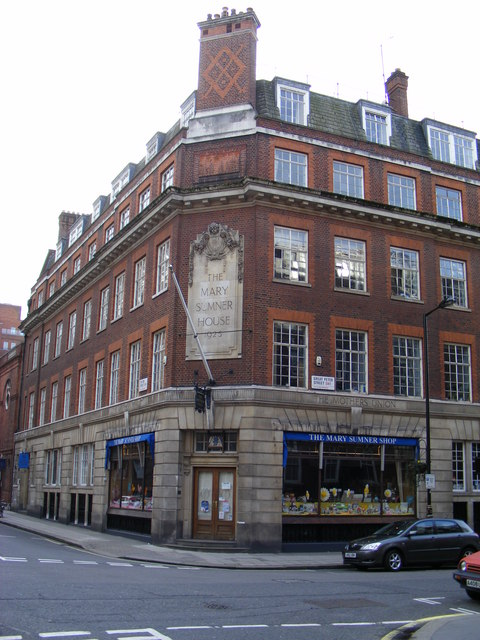
Mary Sumner House, Mother's Union headquarters, Tufton Street, London

In 1851, Rev. George Sumner received the living of Old Alresford, Hampshire, in his father's diocese. Sumner dedicated herself to raising her children and helping her husband in his ministry by providing music and Bible classes. In 1876, when her eldest daughter Margaret gave birth, she was reminded how difficult she had found the burden of motherhood. Inspired, Sumner publicized a meeting of mothers in the parish to offer mutual support. Her plan was quite radical in its day as it involved calling women of all social classes to support one another and to see motherhood as a profession as important as those of men, if not more so. The first meeting was held in Old Alresford Rectory, but Sumner was so overcome by nervousness that her husband had to speak for her and invite the women to return next week. At that second meeting she had gathered enough courage to lead her own meeting.

The nascent Mothers' Union was limited to Sumner's parish. However, in 1885, she was part of the audience in the Portsmouth Church Congress, some 20 miles from her home. The first Bishop of Newcastle, Ernest Wilberforce, had been asked to address the women churchgoers. He felt that he had very little to say to women and invited Sumner to speak in his stead. Although nervous once again, she gave a passionate address about national morality and the importance of women's vocation as mothers to change the nation for the better. A number of the women present went back to their parishes to found mothers' meetings on Sumner's pattern. The Bishop of Winchester, Edward Browne, made the Mothers' Union a diocesan organisation.

The Mothers' Union concept spread rapidly to the dioceses of Ely, Exeter, Hereford, Lichfield and Newcastle and then throughout the United Kingdom. By 1892, 60,000 members lived in 28 dioceses, and by the turn of the century, the Mothers' Union had grown to 169,000 members. Annual general meetings began in 1893, and the Mothers' Union Central Council was formed three years later. Sumner was unanimously elected president, a post she held into her nineties. In 1897, during her Diamond Jubilee, Queen Victoria became patron of the Mothers' Union, giving it an unprecedented stamp of approval. The Mothers' Union set up branches throughout the British Empire, beginning in New Zealand, then Canada and India. Sumner lived to lead the Mothers' Union to act in rebuilding the heart of Britain after the First World War and saw the first Mothers' Union Conference of Overseas Workers in 1920.

== Death and legacy ==
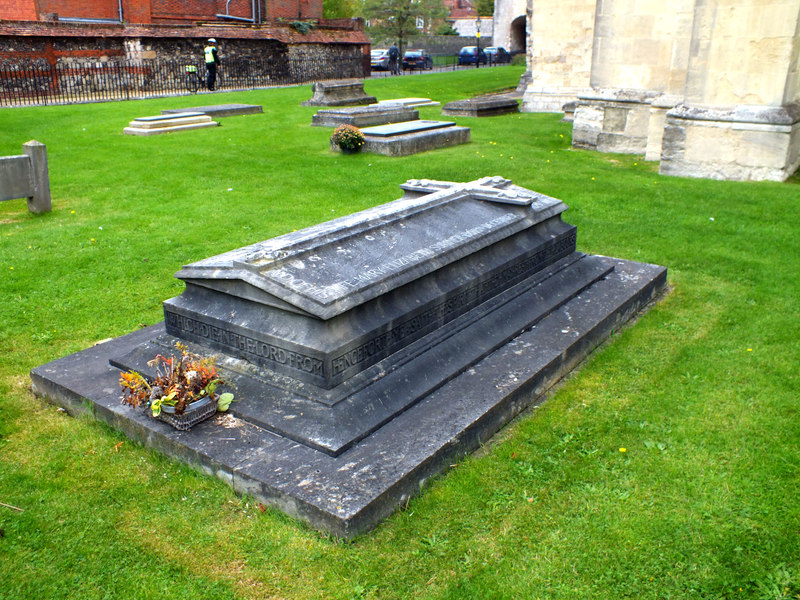
Tomb of Sumner and her husband

On 11 August 1921, Sumner died at her home in Winchester aged 92. Sumner died on 11 August 1921 at the age of 92. Sumner is buried with her husband, who had died 12 years before, in the grounds of Winchester Cathedral.

The inscription on their tomb (from Revelation 14:13) reads:

I heard a voice from Heaven saying unto me/ Write Blessed are the dead which died in the Lord from henceforth./ Here, saith the Spirit, they may rest from their labours,/ And their works do follow them.

There is a memorial to Mary Sumner in St Mary the Virgin parish church, Old Alresford, Hampshire.

Mary Sumner is remembered by many Anglican provinces on 9 August, and in the Church of England she is remembered by a Lesser Festival on this day. The Mothers' Union initially incorrectly listed this as the date of her death. While her detailed biography provides an eyewitness account confirming 11 August, this was already the liturgical feast day of another notable Christian woman, St Clare of Assisi.

Mary Summer House at 24, Tufton Street, Westminster in London is the Mothers' Union headquarters, named in her memory. The Grade II listed building of 1925 was designed by Claude Ferrier. The Mary Sumner Chapel is housed within.
