= Thomas Heywood (disambiguation) =

Thomas Heywood was a playwright and actor.

Thomas Heywood may also refer to:

- Thomas Heywood (railway engineer) (1877–1953), British locomotive engineer
- Thomas Percival Heywood (1823–1897), 2nd Baronet Heywood, banker, philanthropist, WWI army officer
- Thomas Heywood (antiquarian) (1797–1866), English member of the Chetham Society

== See also ==
- Thomas Heyward, signer of the United States Declaration of Independence and of the Articles of Confederation
- Thomas Hayward (disambiguation)
