= Samuel Heywood =

Samuel Heywood may refer to:

- Samuel Heywood (chief justice) (1753–1828), Chief Justice of Wales
- Samuel Heywood (Berkeley) (1833–1903), early resident and President of the Town Board of Trustees (mayor) of Berkeley, California
- Samuel R. Heywood (1821–1913), American businessman
