= Barnes Cemetery =

Cemetery in London, England

Barnes Old Cemetery
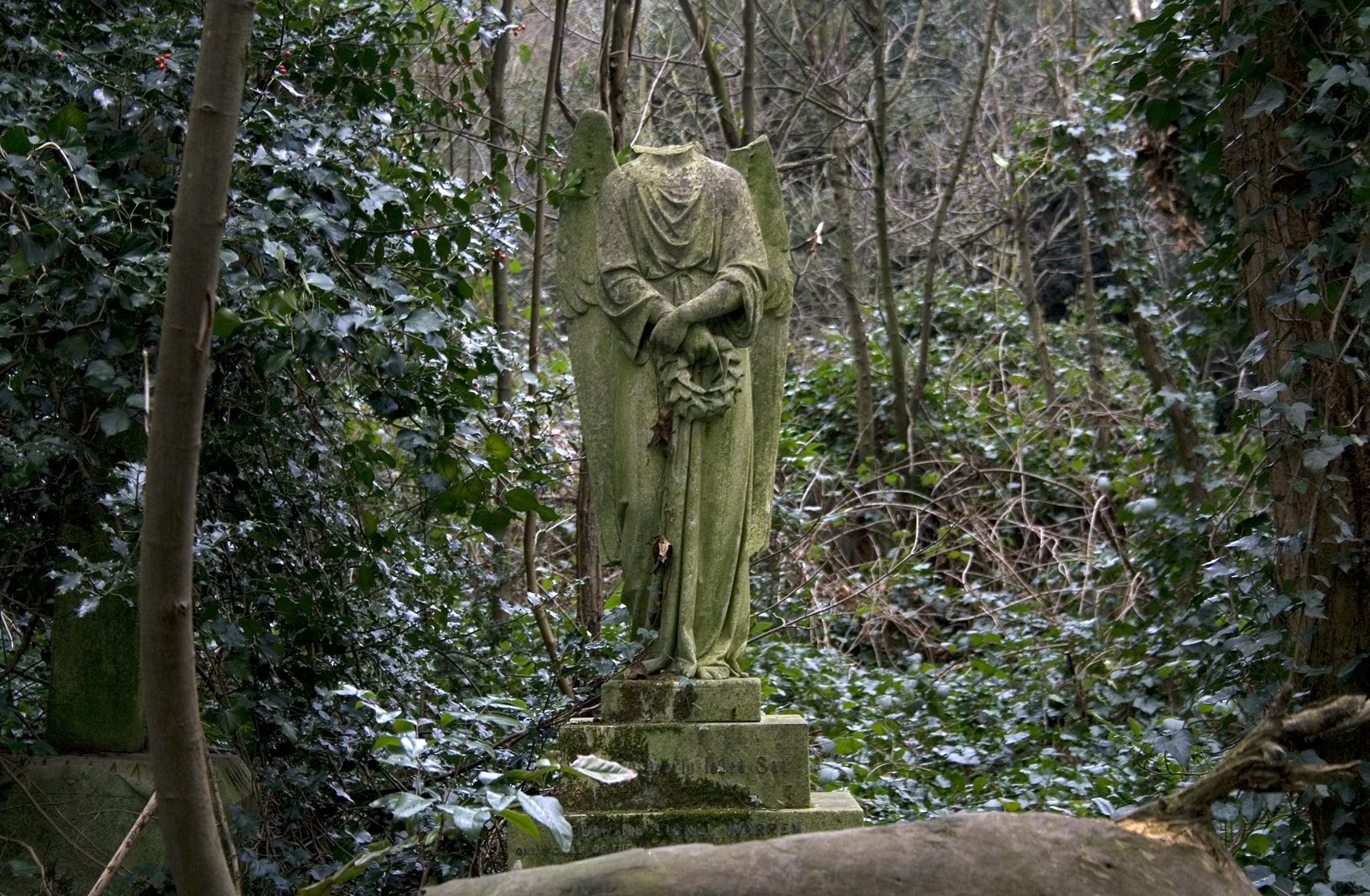
- Decapitated statue of an angel at Barnes Cemetery
- Interactive map of Barnes Old Cemetery

Details
- Established: 1854
- Location: Rocks Lane, Barnes, London, SW13 0BY
- Country: England
- Coordinates: 51.4710°N 0.2344°W
- Type: Disused
- Owned by: Richmond upon Thames London Borough Council
- Size: 2 acres (0.81 ha)

Barnes Cemetery, also known as Barnes Old Cemetery, is a disused cemetery in Barnes, in the London Borough of Richmond upon Thames. It is located off Rocks Lane on Barnes Common.

== History ==
The cemetery was established in 1854 on two acres of sandy ground purchased by the Church of England for the sum of £10. A chapel, lodge and landscaping were provided at a further cost of £1,400. The cemetery functioned as an additional burial ground to the local parish churchyard. It was well-used and a number of distinguished Victorians were buried there, with a variety of monuments and statues erected to their memory. At the centre of the cemetery is a large memorial to the Hedgman family, who were local benefactors in Barnes. The cemetery was claimed to be haunted by a ghostly nun that would hover over the grave of Julia Martha Thomas, the victim of an infamous murder in 1879.

In 1966 the cemetery was acquired by the London Borough of Richmond upon Thames with the intention of turning it into a lawn cemetery, a grass-covered area where each grave is marked with a commemorative plaque rather than standing memorials. The council demolished the chapel and lodge and removed the boundary railings to prepare the cemetery for its new role. However, it then dropped the plans and effectively abandoned the cemetery.

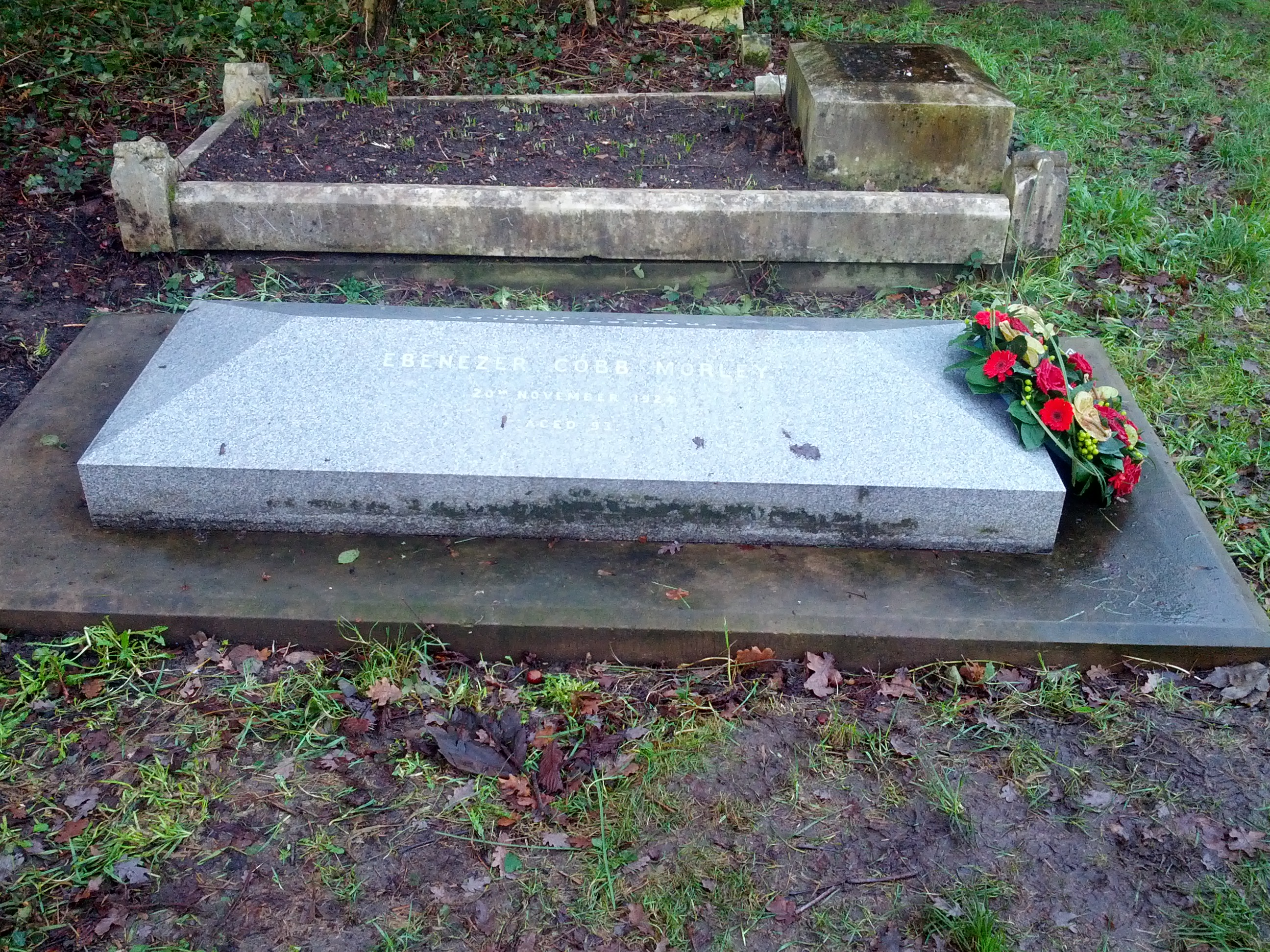
Ebenezer Cobb Morley's grave

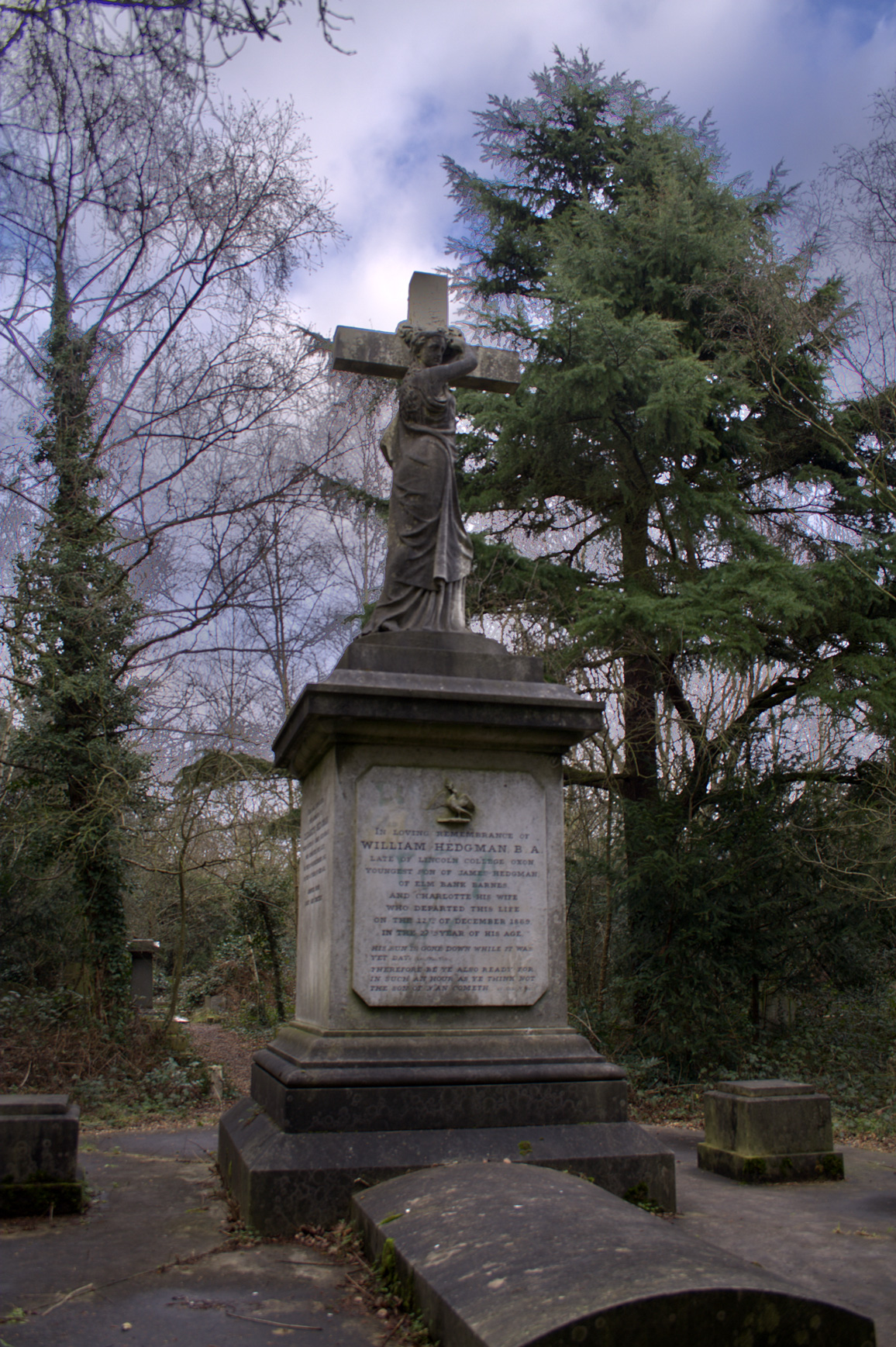
Memorial to William Hedgman at Barnes Cemetery

Over the next thirty years or so, the site was subject to considerable damage and vandalism to graves and monuments. However, within the past decade, the site has seen significant change. No longer neglected, much thought and care now goes into the management of this old cemetery. Indeed, its resultant ‘gothic charm’ and evocative light levels that have been enhanced by selective thinning and conservation work, make it a popular site for local art and film students. The overgrown nature of today's cemetery provides a valuable sanctuary for birds and other fauna. With good feeding grounds all around, many native birds and summer visitors breed in the cemetery, including thrushes, wrens, tits, finches, blackcap, chiff chaff, willow warbler, goldcrest while others migrate through. Some of the original planting is still in evidence: large specimens of yew, cedar, holly, Holm oak, pines and Wych elm. Many of these have produced thickets of seedlings and saplings. There are also native trees such as oak, ash and birch, and bird-sown shrubs such as elder. In some of the more open glades you can see herbaceous species such as Herb Robert, Ox-eye Daisy and foxglove. For its part, Richmond upon Thames Council describes the cemetery as an "atmospheric and romantic place" with "an evocative atmosphere of decay and seclusion".

It is also regarded as a popular dogging hotspot, with many Google reviews alluding to indecent sexual activity occurring late at night.

== Notable interments ==
- Alexander Joseph Finberg (1886–1939) was an art historian focused on the history of British art. He was a founder of the Walpole Society and an expert on J. M. W. Turner.
- James Heywood (1810–1897), philanthropist, MP and social reformer
- Charles Innes (d. 1907), architect who designed St Michael's Church in Barnes and rebuilt much of the parish church
- Augustus Mayhew (1826–1875), journalist and author
- Ebenezer Cobb Morley (1831–1924), regarded as the father of The Football Association and modern football
- Francis Turner Palgrave (1824–1897), professor of poetry, Oxford University
- Henry William Pickersgill (1782–1875), portrait painter. An inscription on his memorial also commemorates his wife Jeanette Pickersgill (d. 1885), the first person to be legally cremated in the UK. Her ashes are at Kensal Green Cemetery.
- Youssef Sirrie or Joseph Sirry (1830–1880), Syrian-born servant of the property developer, Henry Scarth. The pub "The Arab Boy" is named after him. He inherited Scarth's estate.
- Julia Martha Thomas (d. 1879), murder victim
- Samuel Rabbeth (1858–1884), a young doctor who died from diphtheria contracted from a child patient whom he attempted to save.
- Edward Williams (1781–1855), landscape painter
  - His sons, Henry John Boddington (1811–1865), landscape artist
  - George Augustus Williams (1814–1901), landscape artist

== War graves ==
Ten Commonwealth service personnel, whose graves are registered and maintained by the Commonwealth War Graves Commission, are buried at the cemetery, seven from World War I and three from World War II.

== See also ==
- East Sheen Cemetery, originally known as Barnes ("New") Cemetery
