= Heywood Sumner =

British artist and archaeologist (1853–1940)

- Born: George Heywood Maunoir Sumner; 14 October 1853; Old Alresford, Hampshire, UKGBI
- Died: 21 December 1940 (aged 87); Cuckoo Hill, Hampshire, UKGBI
- Education: Christ Church, Oxford, 1874; Lincoln's Inn, 1879
- Spouse: Agnes Benson (m. 1883)
- Children: 5
- Parents: George Sumner (father); Mary Sumner (mother)
- Relatives: Thomas Heywood (grandfather); Charles Sumner (grandfather); William Arthur Smith Benson (brother-in-law); Frank Benson (brother-in-law); Godfrey Benson, 1st Baron Charnwood (brother-in-law)
- Family: Sumner family

George Heywood Maunoir Sumner (14 October 1853 – 21 December 1940), known as Heywood Sumner, was a British artist, archaeologist and representative of the Arts and Crafts movement. In his mid-forties he relocated to Cuckoo Hill, near Fordingbridge in Hampshire, England, and spent the rest of his life investigating and recording the archaeology, geology and folklore of the New Forest and Cranborne Chase regions.

== Early life and education ==
Sumner was born George Heywood Maunoir Sumner on 14 October 1853 in Old Alresford, Hampshire to George Sumner, then rector of Alresford and future Bishop of Guildford, and Mary Sumner (née Heywood), an educator and activist. The youngest of three children, Sumner was grandson of Thomas Heywood, an antiquarian and banker, and Charles Sumner, the Bishop of Winchester.

Educated at Eton College, Sumner later attended Christ Church, Oxford. Graduating in 1874, Sumner initially studied classics before switching to modern history. Entering Lincoln's Inn in 1876, Sumner was called to the bar in 1879 but never practised.

== Art ==
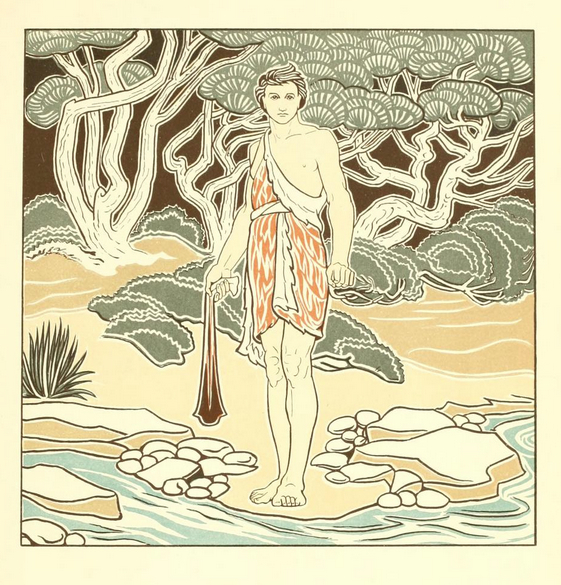
David, published in The Studio, April 1898.

Sumner studied law at Oxford and London alongside his childhood friend W A S Benson, who later became a successful metalwork designer; it was through this friendship that he was introduced to William Morris and the Arts and Crafts movement. He was elected to the Art Workers' Guild and became its Master in 1894.

Sumner engaged in projects to bring Arts and Crafts within the experience of the general public. In particular in the 1890s he helped to set up the Fitzroy Picture Society, a group of artists dedicated to producing boldly coloured prints that could be sold cheaply to liven up the walls of public institutions such as schools and hospitals.

Sumner did not excel in any one particular technique, but his breadth of achievement was remarkable. Several of his areas of expertise are described below.

=== Line drawing and etching ===
Sumner's earliest publications – The Itchen Valley from Tichbourne to Southampton (1881) and The Avon from Naseby to Tewkesbury (1882) – were illustrated with his own etchings, and in 1883 he was commissioned to illustrate an edition of John R. Wise's The New Forest. In the process of illustrating various children's books he developed a more stylised technique, used to good effect in his later publications on the topography and archaeology of the New Forest and surroundings.

=== Sgraffito ===
Sumner experimented with sgraffito, a technique of incising designs in coloured plaster. He started by decorating the houses of his relatives, and later his narrative designs and ornamental patterns covered the walls of several Victorian churches and chapels in the British Isles: from the Church of St Mary the Virgin, Llanfair Kilgeddin(1887–88) to All Saints in Ennismore Gardens, London (1897–1903). There are very fine examples of his work and stained glass at Christ Church, Crookham, Hampshire.

=== Stained glass ===
Sumner designed stained-glass windows for several churches built or redecorated around 1900, sometimes as part of a bigger scheme including his sgraffito and mosaic. Examples of his stained glass work can be found at St Mary (Longworth, Berkshire), All Saints (Ennismore Gardens, London – now a Russian Orthodox cathedral), St Mary the Virgin (Llanfair Kilgeddin, Wales), St Mary Magdalene (North Ockendon, Essex), St Peter (Oakford, Devon) and the rose window at St Mary the Virgin (Great Warley, Essex).

=== Tapestry ===
One of Sumner's last commercial works was a tapestry called The Chace, woven by William Morris and company in 1908.

== Naturalism and the Countryside ==
=== The Book of Gorley ===
In 1910 Sumner published The Book of Gorley, a work that had started out as a personal journal of his new rural way of life. In addition to lyrical descriptions of the topography and natural history of his surroundings, the book includes anecdotes and illustrations of local characters and the history of the New Forest and its adjacent commons.

The earliest version of The Book of Gorley was re-published in 1987 as a full-colour, original manuscript edition with the title Cuckoo Hill: The Book of Gorley. The book is illustrated throughout with Sumner's distinctive line drawings, stylised maps and watercolour paintings.

=== Folk songs ===
Sumner illustrated and published his own collection of eleven Hampshire folk songs, entitled The Besom-Maker and other Country-Folk Songs. He sometimes entertained his fellow members at the Art Worker's Guild with renditions of these songs and in return they called him 'The Shepherd'.

=== Archaeology ===
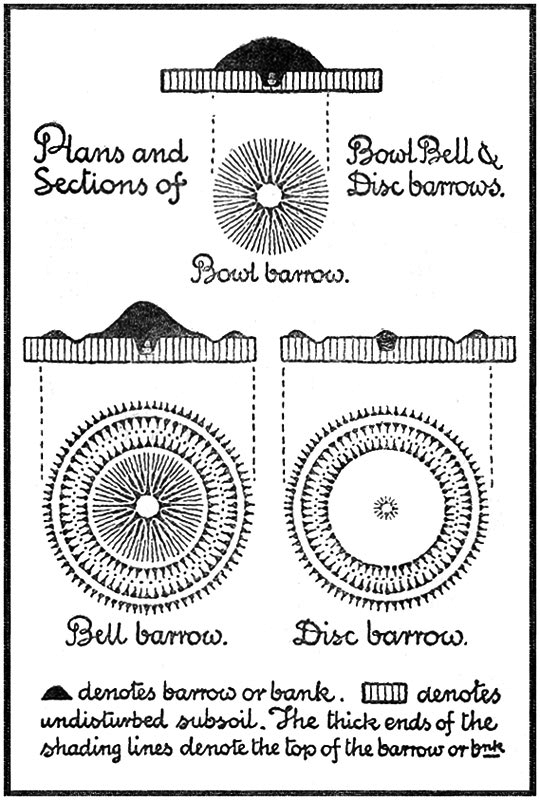
Example of Sumner's illustration style.

Sumner's earliest contributions to archaeology involved surveying the prehistoric earthworks of Cranborne Chase, only a bike-ride away from his home at Cuckoo Hill in the Avon valley. The results of his fieldwork between 1911 and 1913 were published in a collection entitled The Ancient Earthworks of Cranborne Chase. In 1917 he published a companion volume The Ancient Earthworks of the New Forest. In 1921, in partnership with W G Wallace, Sumner published Ancient Earthworks of the Bournemouth District in the proceedings of the Bournemouth Natural Science Society. These three studies of ancient earthworks in the Wessex region included hillforts, enclosures and notable barrows. Sumner's distinctive graphic style was evident in the maps, diagrams and illustrations of these earthworks.

== Personal life ==
In 1883, Sumner married Agnes Benson, the sister of his college friend W A S Benson. Together they had five children – three boys and two girls. In 1897 Sumner retired from London and moved his family to Bournemouth on the south coast of England, ostensibly because of his wife's ill-health. In 1902 he acquired a plot of land at Cuckoo Hill near South Gorley, on the east side of the Avon valley, and designed and built his ideal family house. Sumner lived at Cuckoo Hill from 1904 until his death in 1940 at the age of 87. The house has since been renamed "Heywood Sumner House", and is currently run as a care home.

== Published works ==
- Cuckoo Hill: The Book of Gorley. Dent. 1987. ISBN 0-460-04744-2.
- A guide to the New Forest. Brown & Son. 1924.
- The Itchen Valley from Tichborne to Southampton: twenty-two etchings. London: Seeley, Jackson, and Halliday. 1881. p. 48.
- The Avon, from Naseby to Tewkesbury: Twenty-one Etchings. Scribner & Welford. 1881.
- Heywood Sumner's Wessex. R Gasson Associates. 1985. p. 168. ISBN 9780948495014. OCLC 21757309. OL 8474544M.
