= Sumner family =

American family

Sumner
- Place of origin: England
- Motto: In medio tutissimus ibis (Latin for 'In the middle path, thou shalt be safest')

The Sumner family is a prominent political and agricultural family based throughout the eastern United States in what was formally known as the Thirteen Colonies, primarily in Massachusetts, Virginia, North Carolina, and Georgia. The family, who accumulated power through the generational efforts of statesmen, military leaders, and planters can trace its ancestry back to Oxfordshire, England. The Sumner family as it is known today emigrated to the United States throughout the mid to late 1600s, while a branch of the family maintained itself in England and obtained high ranking positions in the Church of England such as John Bird Sumner who went on to become the Archbishop of Canterbury from 1848 to 1862.

Descendants of the family who emigrated to the United States proved to be successful statesmen and military leaders with many of those family members becoming early settlers of areas such as Dorchester, Massachusetts, now part of Boston, along with settlements and plantations along the James River in the Virginia Colony, such as Nansemond.

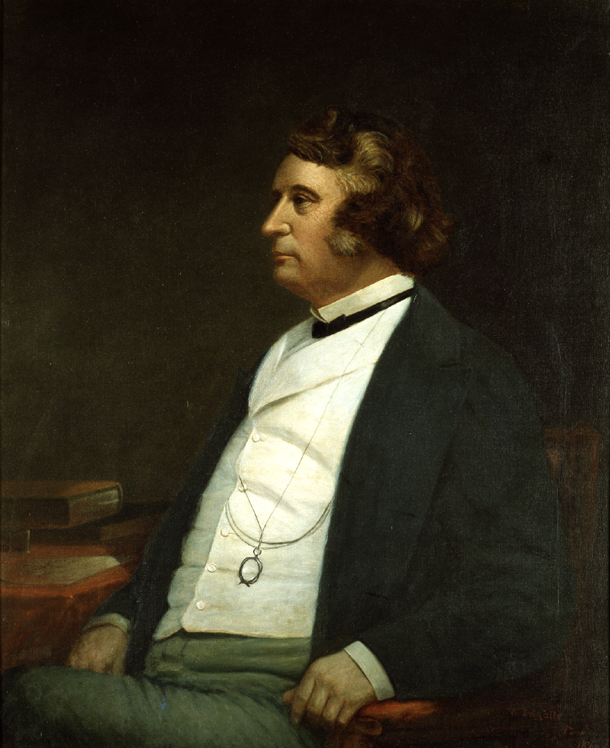
Massachusetts Senator Charles Sumner who is primarily remembered for being brutally assaulted by Representative Preston Brooks of South Carolina as he sat writing at his desk in the Senate Chamber on May 22, 1856.

== Massachusetts Sumners ==
- Increase Sumner, The 5th Governor of Massachusetts
- William H. Sumner, The Son of Governor Increase Sumner and an early Massachusetts historian
- Charles Sumner, A prominent U.S. Senator, statesman, and abolitionist during the U.S. Civil War
- Edwin Vose Sumner, A Union General during the U.S. Civil War.
- Edwin Vose Sumner Jr., A Union General during the U.S. Civil War
- Samuel S. Sumner, A U.S. Army General during the later 19th Century
- James B. Sumner, Nobel Prize in Chemistry
- Jessie Sumner, U.S. Representative from Illinois
- Thomas Waldron Sumner, architect
- Thomas Hubbard Sumner, navigator
- Allen Melancthon Sumner, US Marine Corps
- George G. Sumner, Lieutenant Governor of Connecticut
- John Colton Sumner, explorer
- George D. Gould, American financier and banker

=== Virginia Sumners ===
- Jethro Sumner, A General of the Continental Army during the American Revolutionary War

== Warwickshire Sumners ==
- John Sumner (died 1772), cleric, academic and Provost of King's College, Cambridge
- Humphrey Sumner (1743–1814), priest, educationalist and Provost of King's College, Cambridge
- John Bird Sumner (1780–1862), Archbishop of Canterbury
- Charles Richard Sumner (1790–1874), Bishop of Winchester
- George Sumner (1824–1909), Bishop of Guildford
- Mary Sumner (née Heywood; 1828–1921), educator and activist, known for founding the Mothers' Union
- John Gibson (1833–1892), priest and cricketer
- Arthur Gibson (1844–1927), rugby player and civil engineer
- John Robert Sumner (1850–1933), amateur footballer and later rancher
- Heywood Sumner (1853–1940), artist and archaeologist
- Alan Gibson (1856–1922), Coadjutor Bishop of Cape Town
