= Samuel Rabbeth =

British doctor

Dr Samuel Rabbeth (19 August 1858 – 20 October 1884) was a young medical doctor who died from diphtheria contracted from a child patient whom he tried to save. His tragic death was widely reported in the newspapers and there is a memorial to him in Postman's Park, London.

== Early life and education ==
He was born at St Pancras, London in 1858, his father, John Edward, working at Coutts' bank in the Strand. In 1881 up to his death in 1900 his father was living at Middleton Lodge, Upper Richmond Road, Barnes.

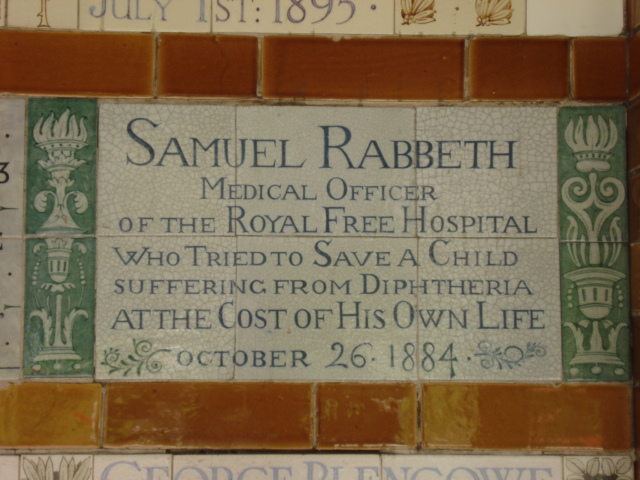
Postman's Park

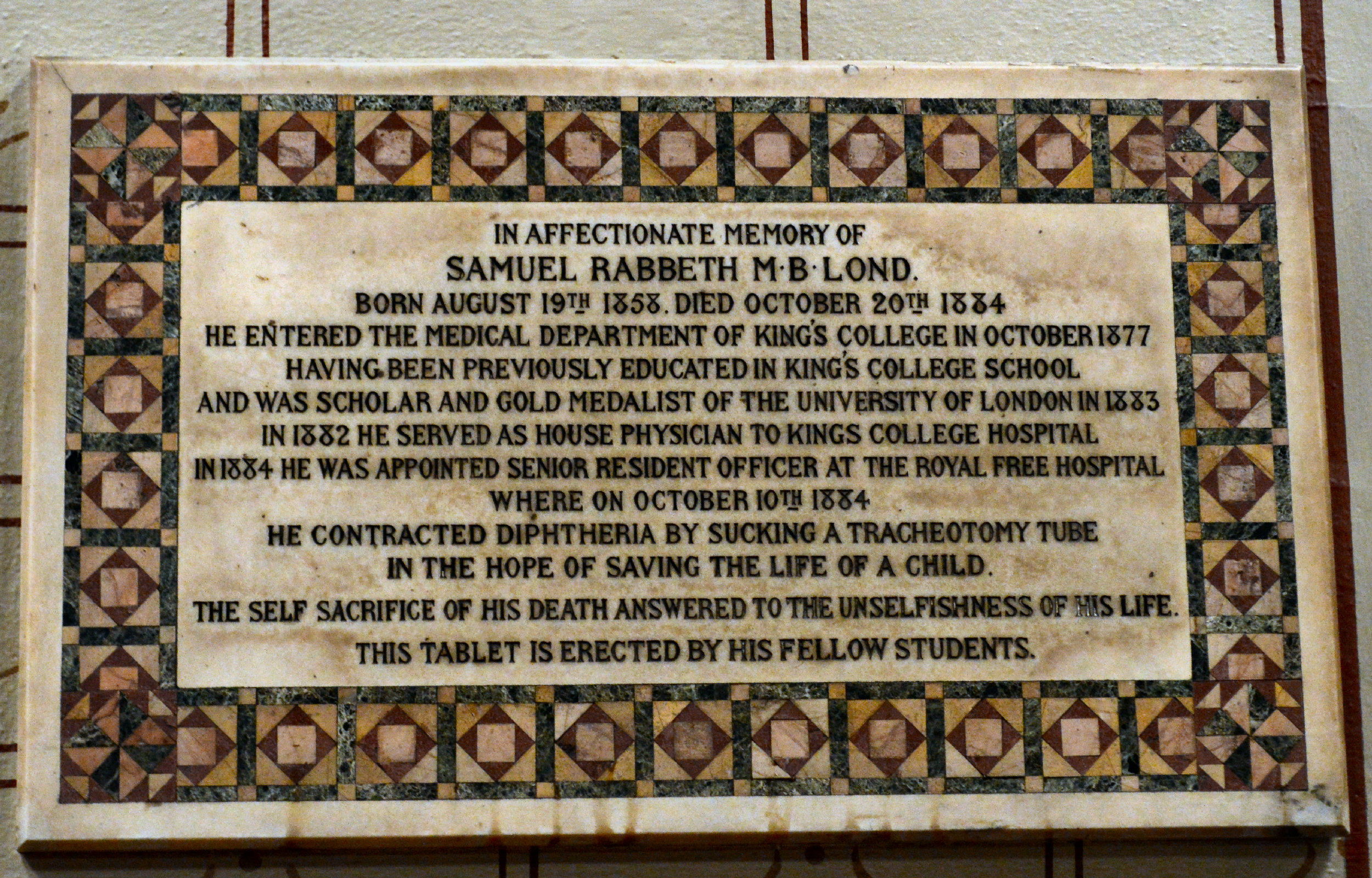
King's College Chapel

He was educated at King's College School, London, and at King's College Hospital and was elected an associate at the College. He was admitted to the Royal College of Surgeons and passed his M.B. examination in Obstetric medicine, receiving the University Scholarship and the Gold Medal, at the University of London in 1883. He was appointed senior resident medical officer at the Royal Free Hospital, London, in April 1884.

== Death ==
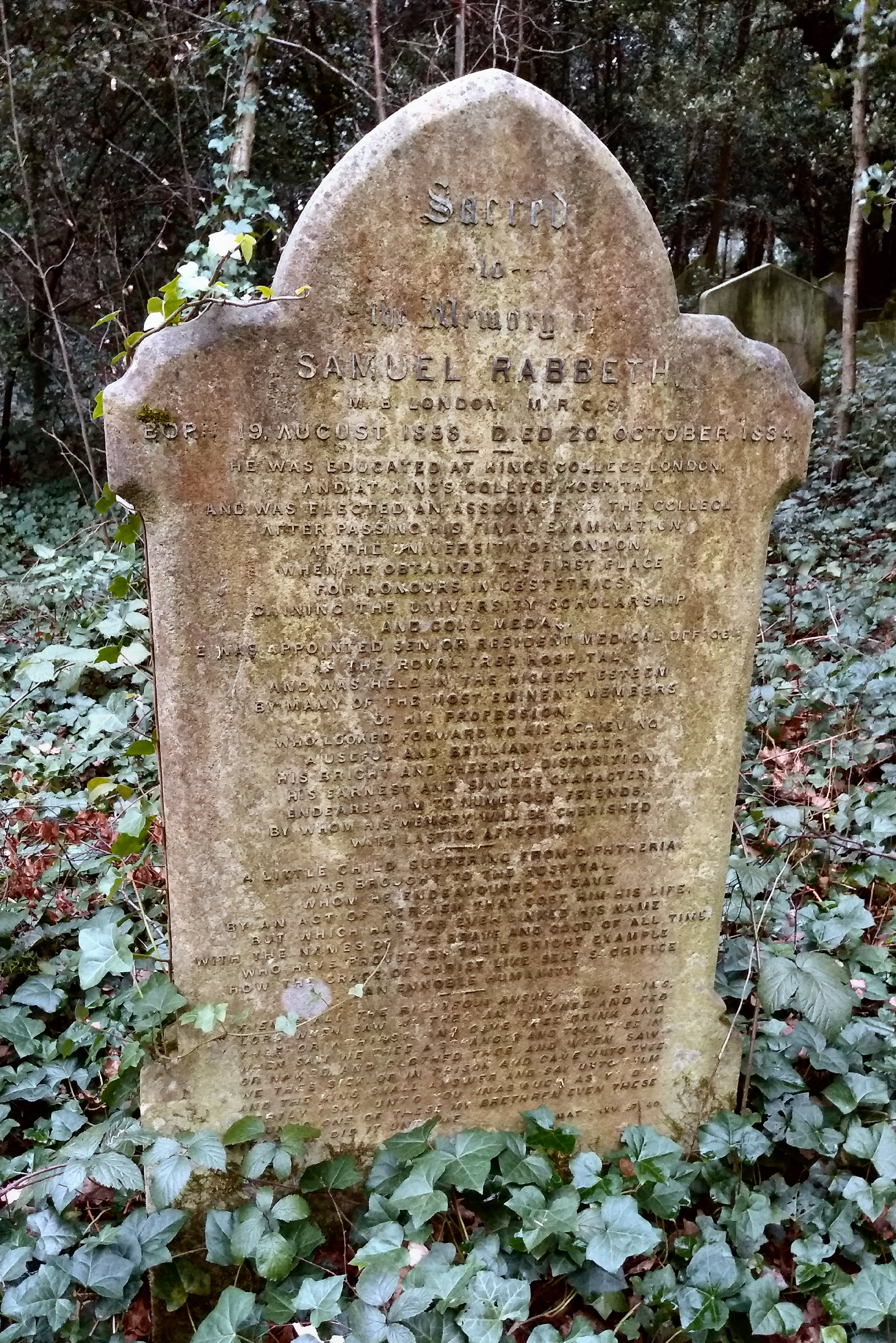
Barnes Old Cemetery

He was senior medical officer of the Royal Free Hospital when a four-year old child, Leon Rex Jennings, was admitted suffering from diphtheria. In order to save the child's life it was necessary to perform a tracheotomy, but the windpipe was found to be blocked. Dr Rabbeth used a tube to suck the matter out of the throat of the child. Afterwards he found that he was suffering from diphtheria and died on 20 October surrounded by his relations, friends and colleagues. The child later died.

== Memorials ==
He was buried in Barnes Old Cemetery together with his father and aunt; his career is described in detail on his headstone.

Inscription
"Sacred to the memory of Samuel Rabbeth, M.B. London M.R.C.S.

Born 19, August 1858. Died 20 October 1884.

He was educated at King's College London, and at King's College Hospital and was elected an associate at the College after passing his final examination at the University of London. When he obtained the first place for honours in obstetrics gaining the university scholarship and gold medal. He was appointed senior resident medical officer at the Royal Free Hospital and was held in the highest esteem by many of the most eminent members of his profession who looked forward to his achieving a useful and brilliant career. His bright and cheerful disposition, his earnest and sincere character endeared him to numerous friends by whom his memory will be cherished with lasting affection.

A little child suffering from diphtheria was brought to the hospital whom he endeavoured to save by an act of heroism that cost him his life but which for ever links his name with the names of the brave and good of all time, who have proved by their bright example how the grace of Christ like self sacrifice can ennoble humanity.

Then shall the righteous answer him, saying, Lord, when saw we thee an hungred, and fed thee? or thirsty, and gave thee drink? When saw we thee a stranger, and took thee in? or naked, and clothed thee? Or when saw we thee sick, or in prison, and came unto thee? And the King shall answer and say unto them, Verily I say unto you, Inasmuch as ye have done it unto one of the least of these my brethren, ye have done it unto me. Matthew 25, 37-40."

A brass tablet was placed in the inquest room of the Royal Free Hospital with the inscription "This tablet has been erected by the authorities of the Royal Free Hospital, Gray's-inn-road, and the medical staff to the memory of Samuel Rabbeth, M.B., M.R.C.S., Senior Resident Medical Officer of this hospital, who sacrificed his own life in the endeavour to save that of a little child, a patient under his care. Died 20th October, 1884; aged 26 years." A scholarship was named after him.

There is a memorial to him in Postman's Park, London and another in King's College Chapel at the Strand, London.
