= Heywood's Bank =

Defunct bank in England

Heywood's Bank was a private banking firm established and run in Manchester by members of the Heywood family of Pendleton between 1788 and 1874.

== Family and banking history ==
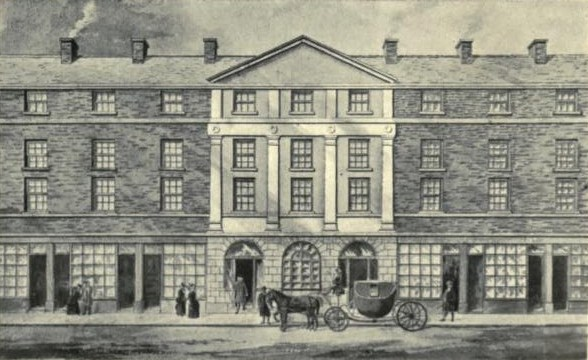
Heywood's Bank in the 18th century

The bank was founded as Benjamin Heywood, Sons & Co in Manchester by Benjamin Heywood and his two sons, Benjamin and Nathaniel. Also known as the Manchester Bank, it began trading in May 1788. The Heywoods had moved to Manchester from Liverpool, where the elder Benjamin had worked as a merchant and ship-owner alongside his brother Arthur.

All four Heywoods were involved in the Atlantic slave trade, co-owning slave ships. They were merchants that built their wealth from profits gained in the trade of slaves. Their involvement with the slave trade lasted from 1752 to the parliamentary abolition of slavery in 1807

By 1773 Arthur had already founded a successful bank in Liverpool. The elder Benjamin and his two sons used £10,000 of family money in bills to Manchester to found their new bank.

On Benjamin's death in 1795, the Manchester firm became known as "Heywood Brothers & Co". In 1814, Nathaniel’s eldest son Benjamin Heywood joined the firm. Nathaniel died in 1815. Two more of Nathaniel’s sons then joined the firm; Thomas in 1818 and Richard in 1820. Benjamin Arthur Heywood, the last of the original founders, died in 1828 and in 1829 both Thomas and Richard retired from banking, leaving their brother Benjamin as the sole partner. He renamed the Bank "Benjamin Heywood & Co."

Benjamin was created the First Baronet of Claremont in 1838 and he re-titled the bank ‘Sir Benjamin Heywood Bart. & Co’. He later brought his four sons into the firm when they came of age: Oliver, Arthur, Edward and Charles. Benjamin retired in 1860, leaving his sons to run the firm, which they renamed ‘Heywood Brothers & Co’.

== Locations ==
The bank was opened in Exchange Street, Manchester in 1788. In 1795 they moved to St Ann Street. There was a short-lived attempt to open a branch at Stockport about 1820.

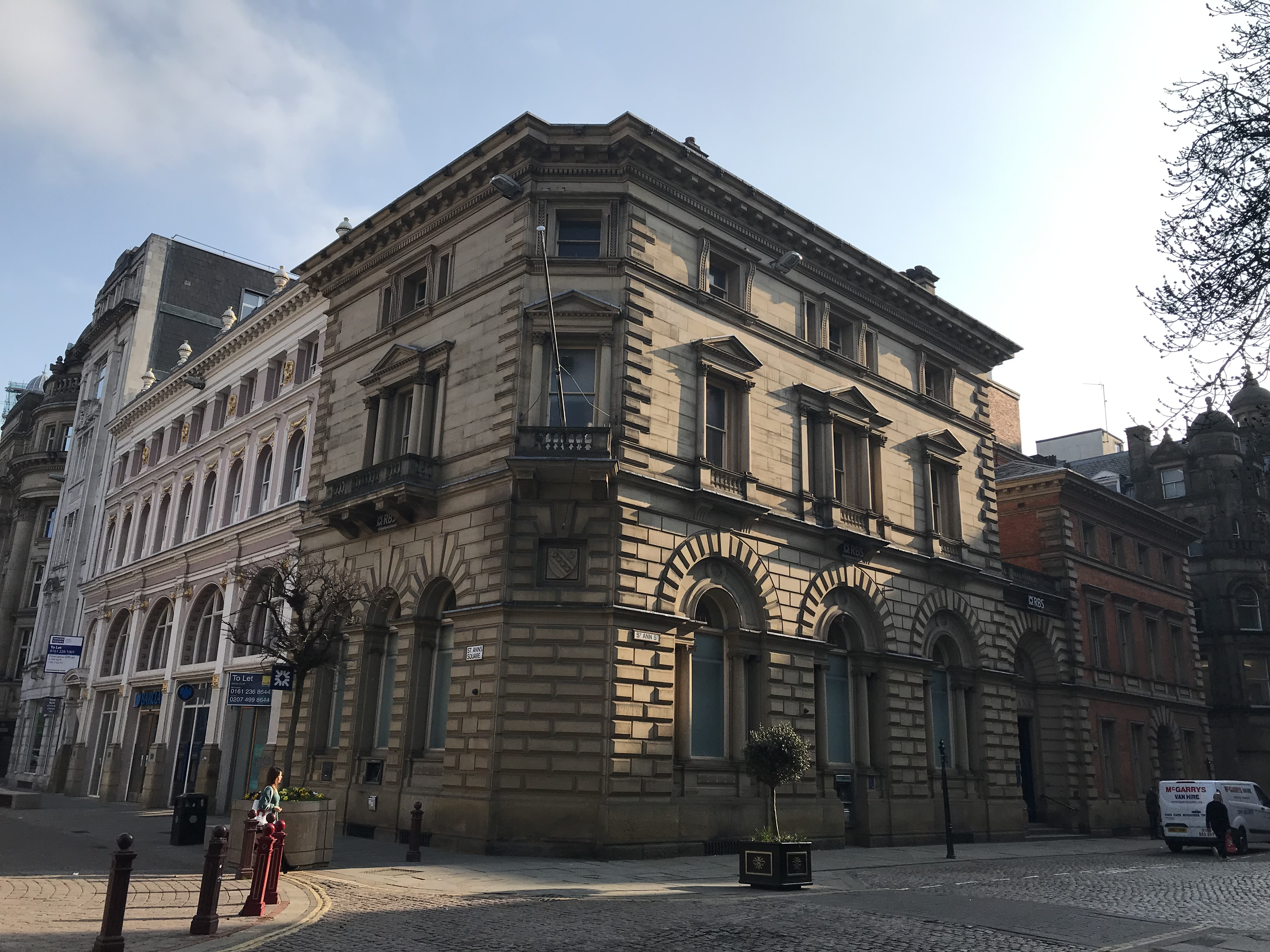
The former Heywood banking house, St Ann Street and St Ann's Square, Manchester, now a branch of RBS

In 1848, the Heywood family had a new building built at 25 St Ann Street. It was designed by John Edgar Gregan, "a three-storey stone clad building in the Italian style, with a deeply rusticated ground floor and two upper floors in ashlar. The ground floor windows, large to light the banking hall, have arched openings, inside which the arched windows are flanked by classical columns. Next to it is a smaller building in brick with stone detailing which was the home of the bank manager" The building is still in use today as a branch of the Royal Bank of Scotland.

== Sale and closure ==
In April 1874, Heywood’s Bank was acquired by the Manchester & Salford Bank for £240,000. In 1890, the Manchester & Salford Bank became Williams Deacon's Bank, which in 1930 was acquired by the Royal Bank of Scotland.

== See also ==
- Royal Bank of Scotland
- Heywood Baronets
