= Hope End =

Area and former estate of Herefordshire, England

Coordinates: 52.06897°N 2.40592°W

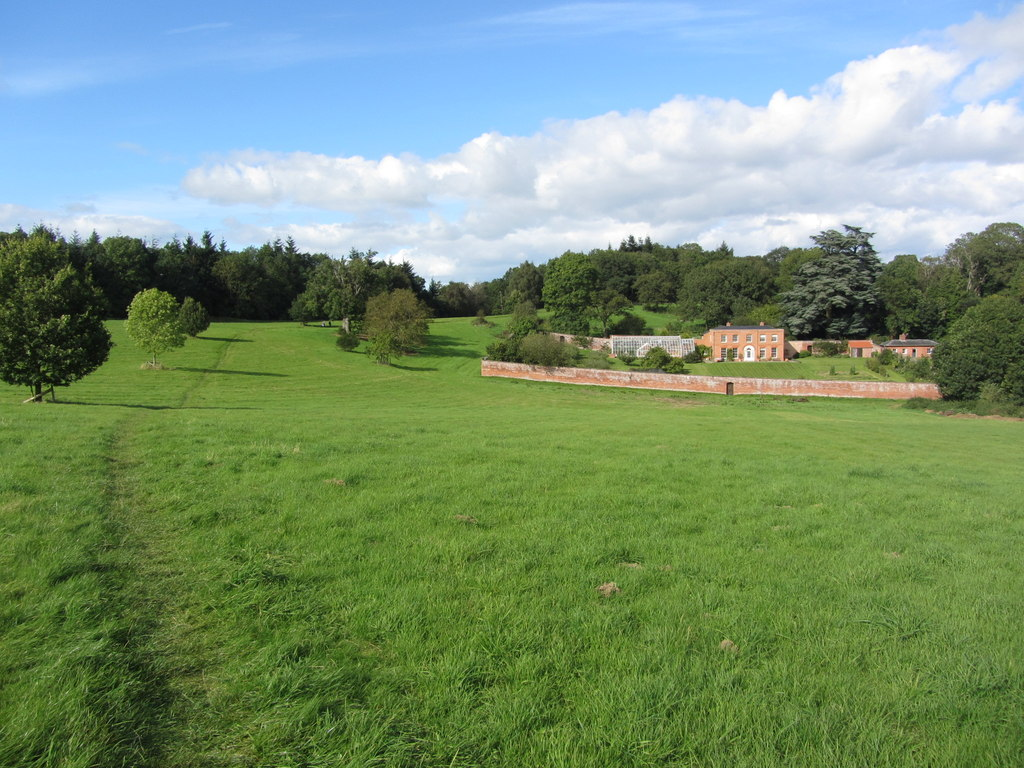
Hope End House and walled garden today

Hope End is an area and former estate of Herefordshire, England near the Malvern Hills, noted for its literary associations. As described by a 19th-century railway guide, Hope End Park and a country house lay near the West Midland Railway, between the stations at Colwall and Ledbury. Hope End House may refer to any one of three houses on the estate, all reduced and much altered from their original states. Hope End ward is a local government area that is more extensive than the old estate.

In 1831 an earlier guide, to Ledbury, noted Hope End among "gentlemen's seats and residences", by the Colwall road. It belonged then to E. M. Barrett. This was Edward Moulton-Barrett, father of Elizabeth Barrett Browning who was brought up there; financial problems caused him to sell it the following year. The same guide gives fulsome praise to the Park: "Nothing can surpass the romantic beauty of Hope-end park. The most lovely graces of nature are here combined." According to Elizabeth, the setting for her poem The Lost Bower was the wood above Hope End House's garden.

Land at Hope End, around 100 hectares (250 acres), is on the Register of Historic Parks and Gardens of English Heritage.

== Owners ==
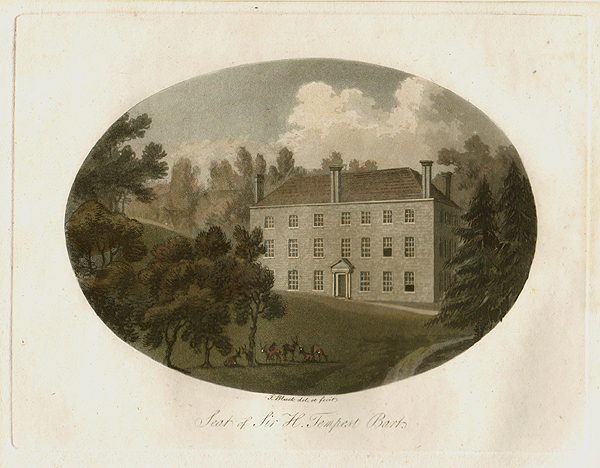
Hope End House, the seat of Sir Henry Tempest, 4th Baronet

- George Pritchard of Hope End, in the 18th century, had sole heiress Susannah Pritchard Lambert, his granddaughter and the daughter of Henry Lambert, who married Sir Henry Tempest, 4th Baronet (1753–1819) in 1791.
- Sir Henry Tempest, 4th Baronet, who acquired the Hope End estate by his marriage. The Beauties of England and Wales wrote (1805) "On the well-wooded eminence called the Dog-hill, north of Ledbury, is Hope End, a small but very pleasant seat, belonging to Sir Harry Vane Tempest, Bart."
- Edward Moulton-Barrett, who bought the house and land in 1809, with 475 acres (192 ha) of land. The existing house was modified, becoming stables. A new house was completed, to a design and with a garden by John Claudius Loudon. In the "Moorish style", with minarets, it was completed by 1812.
- Thomas Heywood purchased the house in 1832. He died in 1866.
- (James) Charles Archibald Hewitt (1837–1910), of the 24th Foot.

The house was burnt in 1910, but the stables remained.

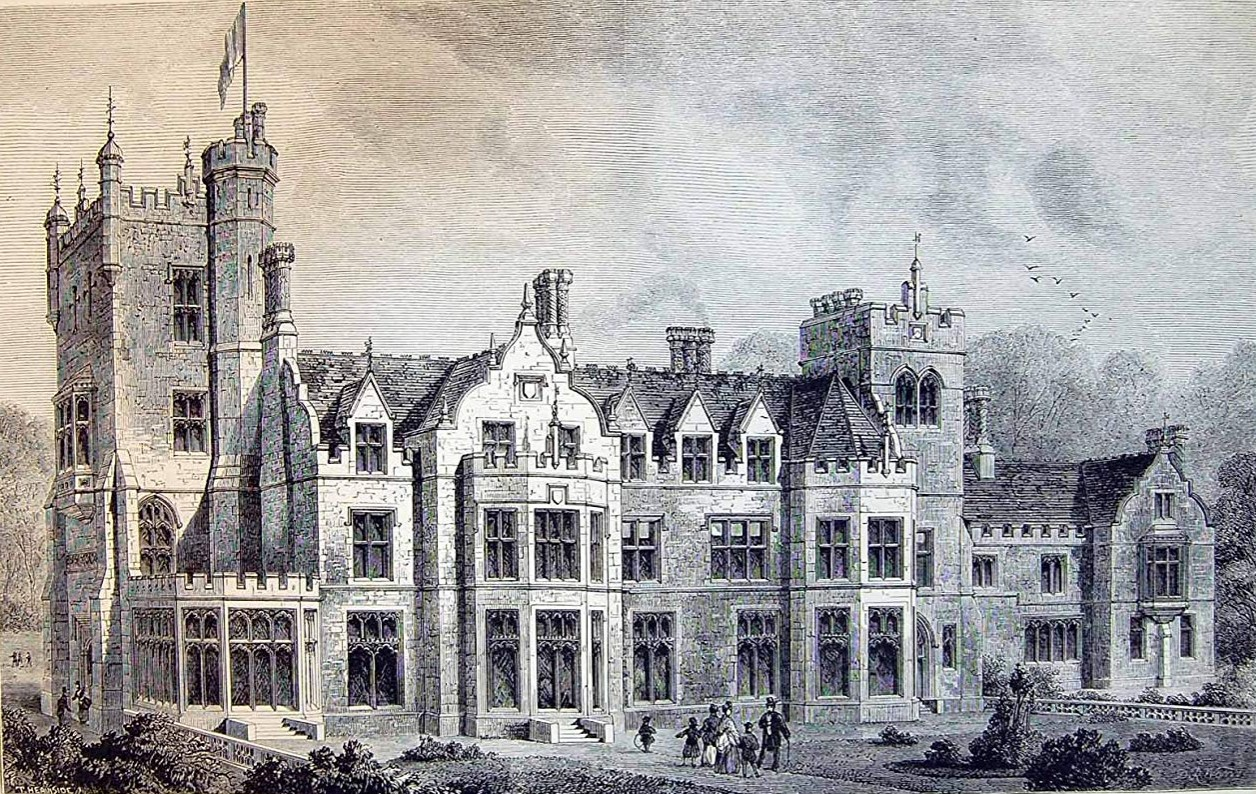
Mansion at Hope End, 1873 engraving. This building for C. A. Hewitt was the replacement to the largely demolished house built by Edward Moulton-Barrett

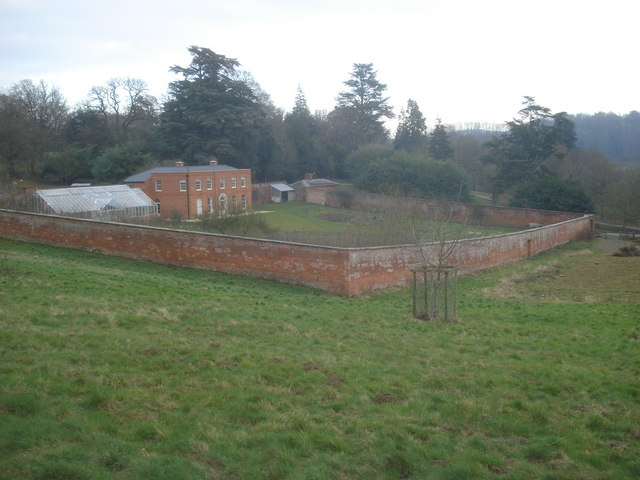
Contemporary form of the 18th century Hope End House
