= Thomas Hayward =

Thomas Hayward may refer to:

- Thomas Hayward (16th-century MP) (died 1534), MP for Ipswich in 1529
- Thomas Hayward (cricketer) (1835–1876), English cricketer
- Thomas Hayward (Royal Navy officer) (1767–1798), British sailor who was present during the mutiny on the Bounty
- Thomas Hayward (tenor) (1917–1995), American operatic tenor
- Thomas B. Hayward (1924-2022), Chief of Naval Operations for the United States Navy
- Thomas B. Hayward (politician) (1838–1919), American politician
- Tom Hayward (1871–1939), English cricketer
- Thomas Hayward (Australian politician) (1832–1915), Australian politician
- Tom Hayward (motorcyclist) (born 1982), British Grand Prix motorcycle racer
- Thomas Hayward (MP for Ludgershall) (1706–1781), British MP for Ludgershall
- Thomas Hayward (Florida politician), one of the mayors of Tallahassee, Florida
- Thomas Hayward (warden), warden of New College, Oxford, from 1764 to 1768

== See also ==
- Thomas Heyward Jr. (1746–1809), a signer of the United States Declaration of Independence
- Thomas Heywood (disambiguation)
