= Alexander Joseph Finberg =

English art historian

Alexander Joseph Finberg (April 23, 1866 – March 15, 1939) was an art historian focused on the History of British Art who was a founder of the Walpole Society and an expert on J. M. W. Turner.

Finberg was educated at City of London College, King's College London and the Lambeth School of Art. In 1905, Finberg was commissioned to catalogue and organise the paintings in the Turner Bequest. His work rediscovered numerous previously unknown Turner canvases which led to Joseph Duveen, 1st Baron Duveen to build a new wing devoted to Turner at the Tate Britain. His resulting publication of the Complete Inventory of the Drawings of the Turner Bequest in 1909 is still widely used by contemporary scholars and students. In 1911 he co-founded the Walpole Society.

== Bibliography ==
- Complete Inventory of the Drawings of the Turner Bequest (1909)
- The development of British landscape painting in water-colours (1918)
- The History of Turner's Liber Studiorum. With a new catalogue raisonn (1924)
- The Life of J M W Turner, RA (1939)
