= John B. Heywood (photographer) =

American photographer

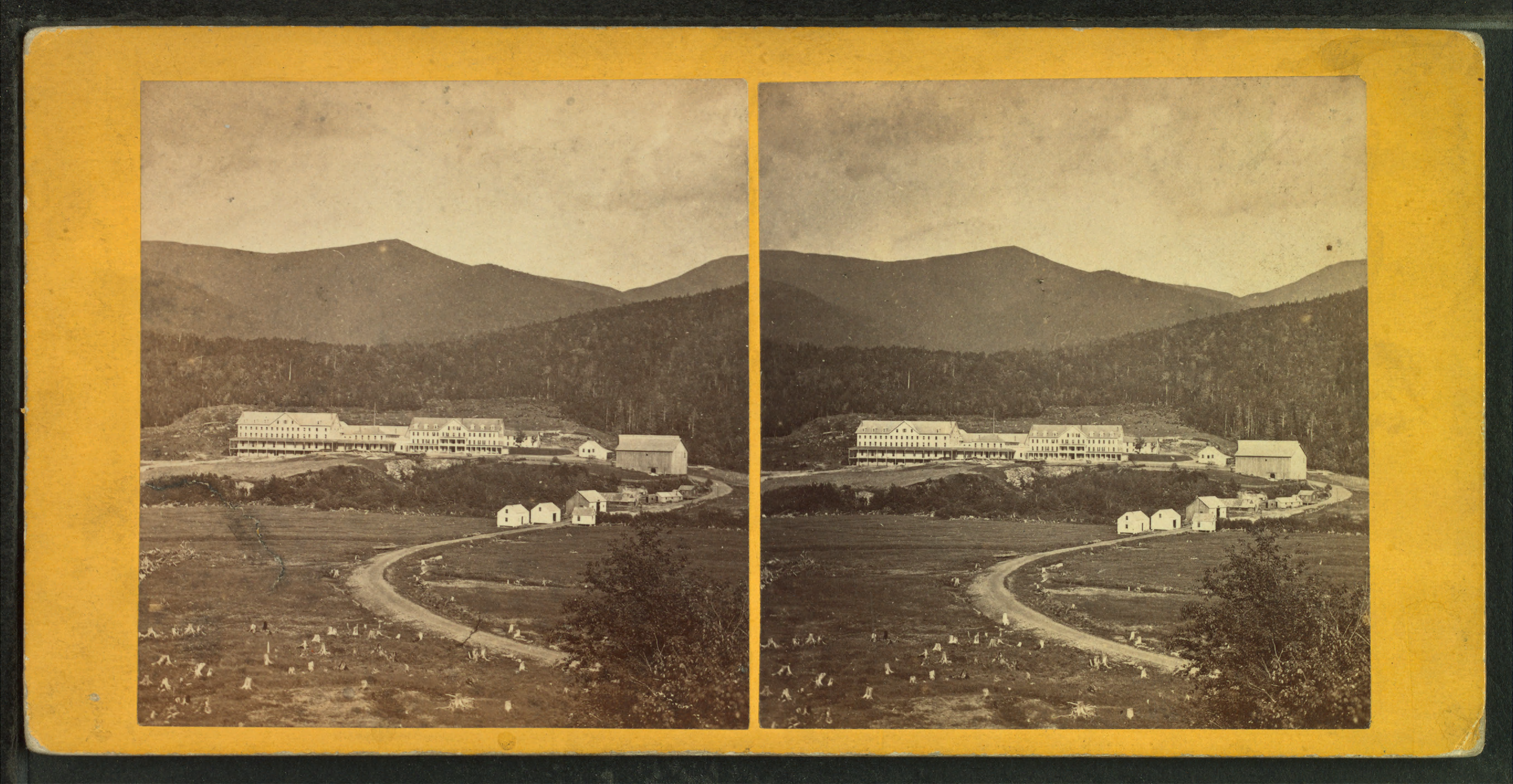
Stereoscopic image of the Glen House and Carter Range near Mount Washington (New Hampshire) in the White Mountains (New Hampshire)

John Brooks Heywood (August 8, 1825 – ) was an American photographer who worked in Boston, Massachusetts, c. 1856-1861. Examples of his photographs reside in the New York Public Library and the Massachusetts Historical Society.

Heywood was born in Shrewsbury, Massachusetts, to Daniel Heywood and Maria Brooks. In 1849, he married Mary Russell Andrews.

== Image gallery ==
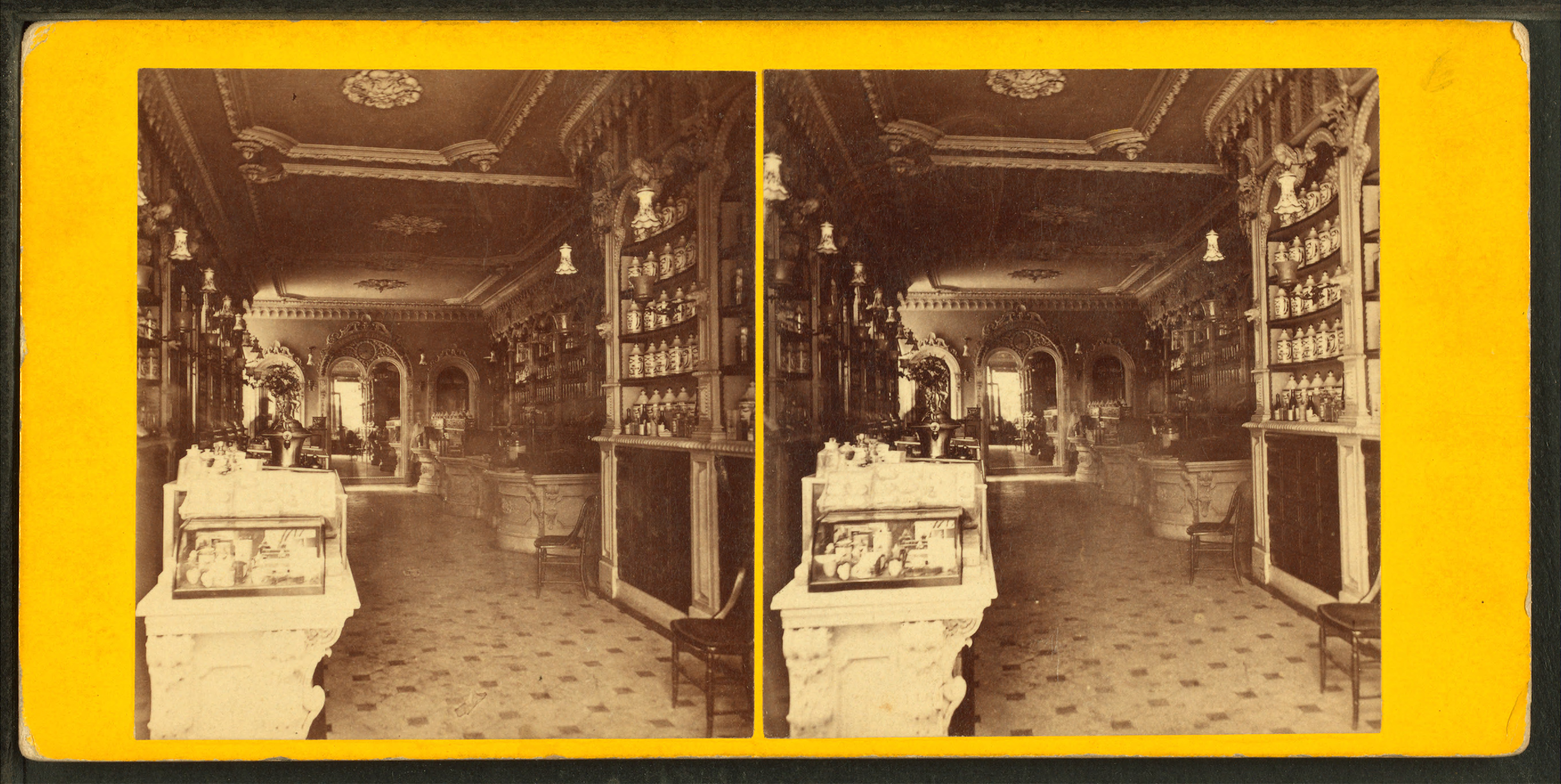
Apothecary, Boston(?), 19th century

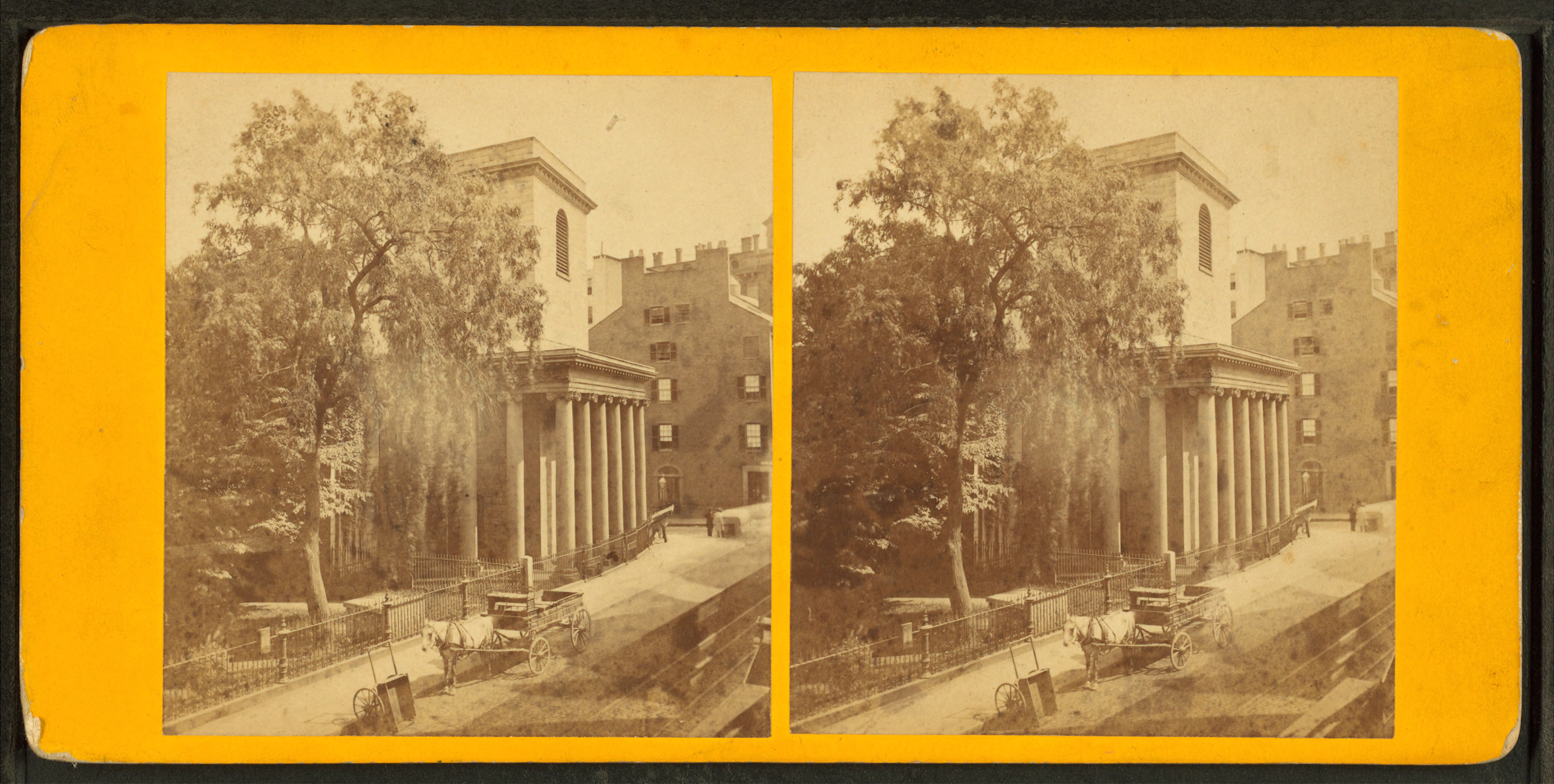
Tremont St., Boston, 19th century

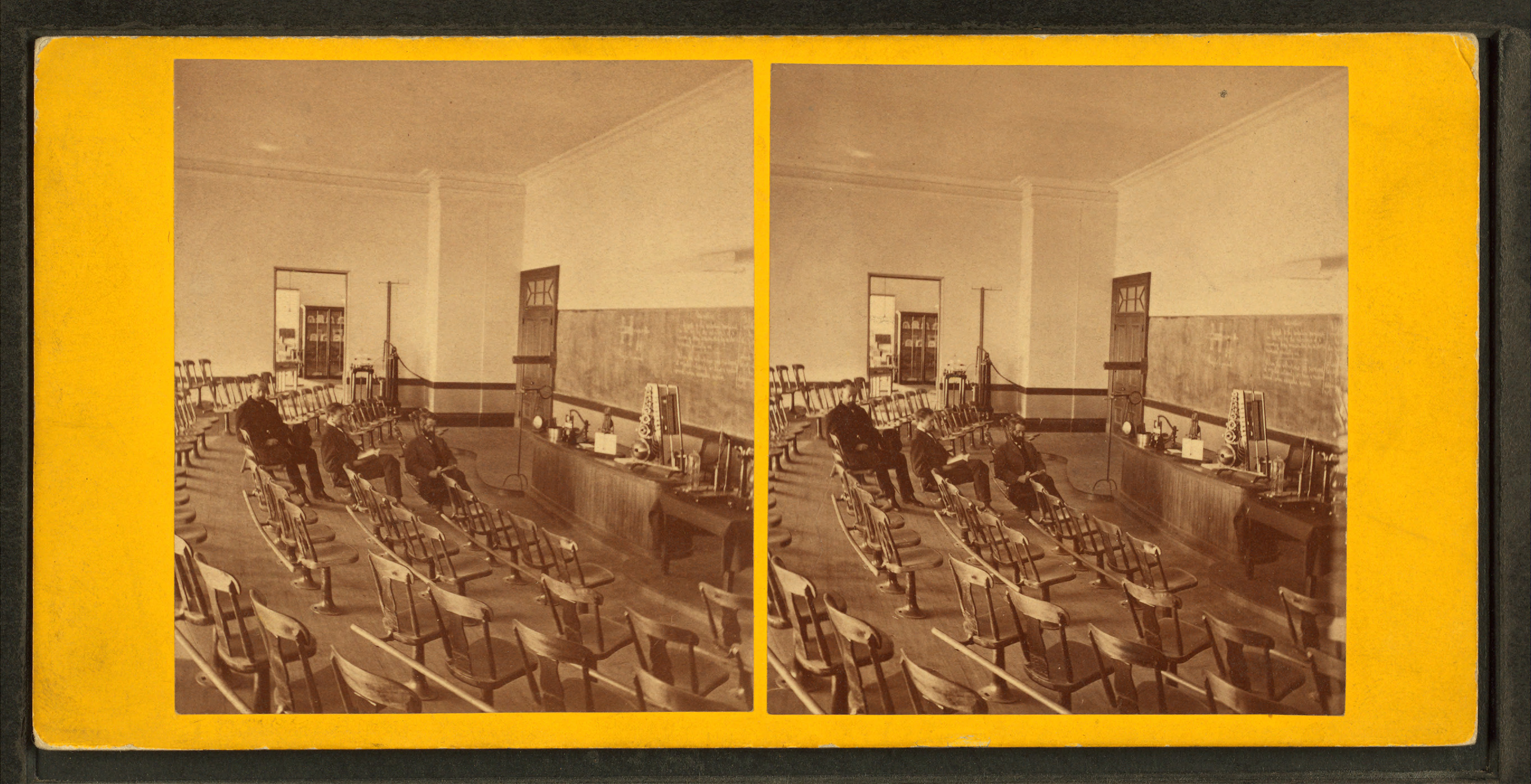
Institute of Technology, Boston, 19th century

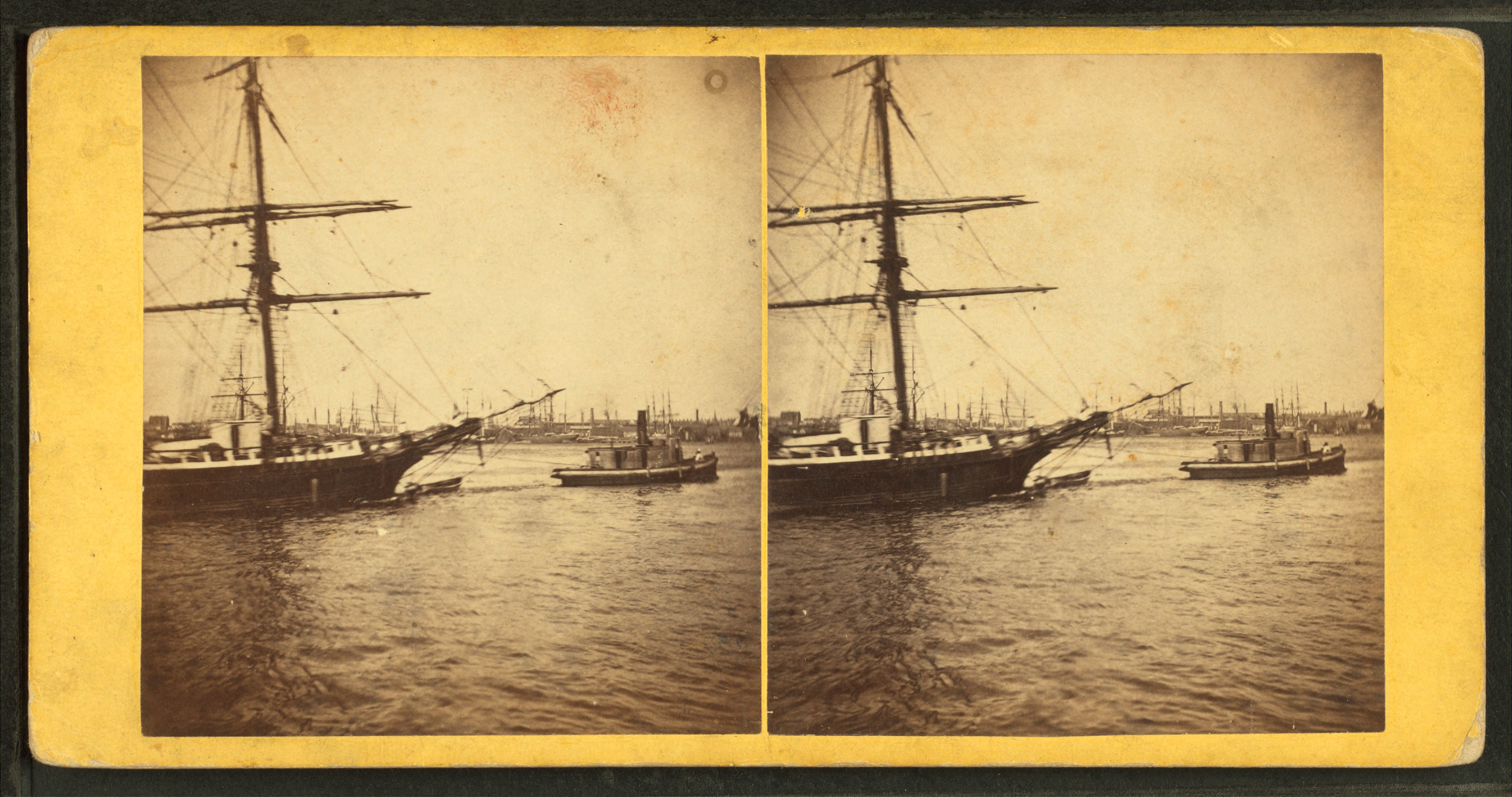
Boston Harbor(?), 19th century

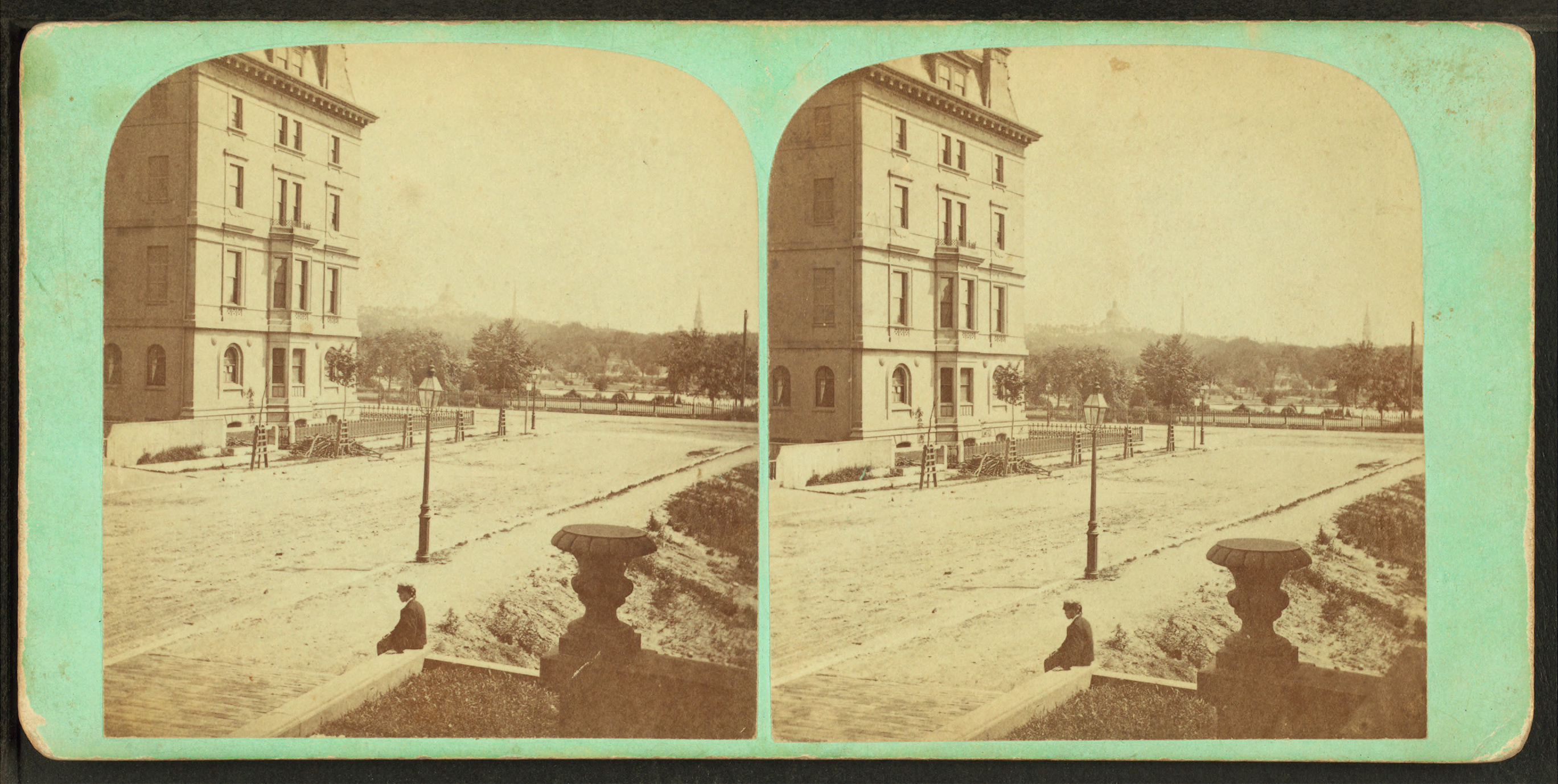
Newbury St., Boston, 19th century

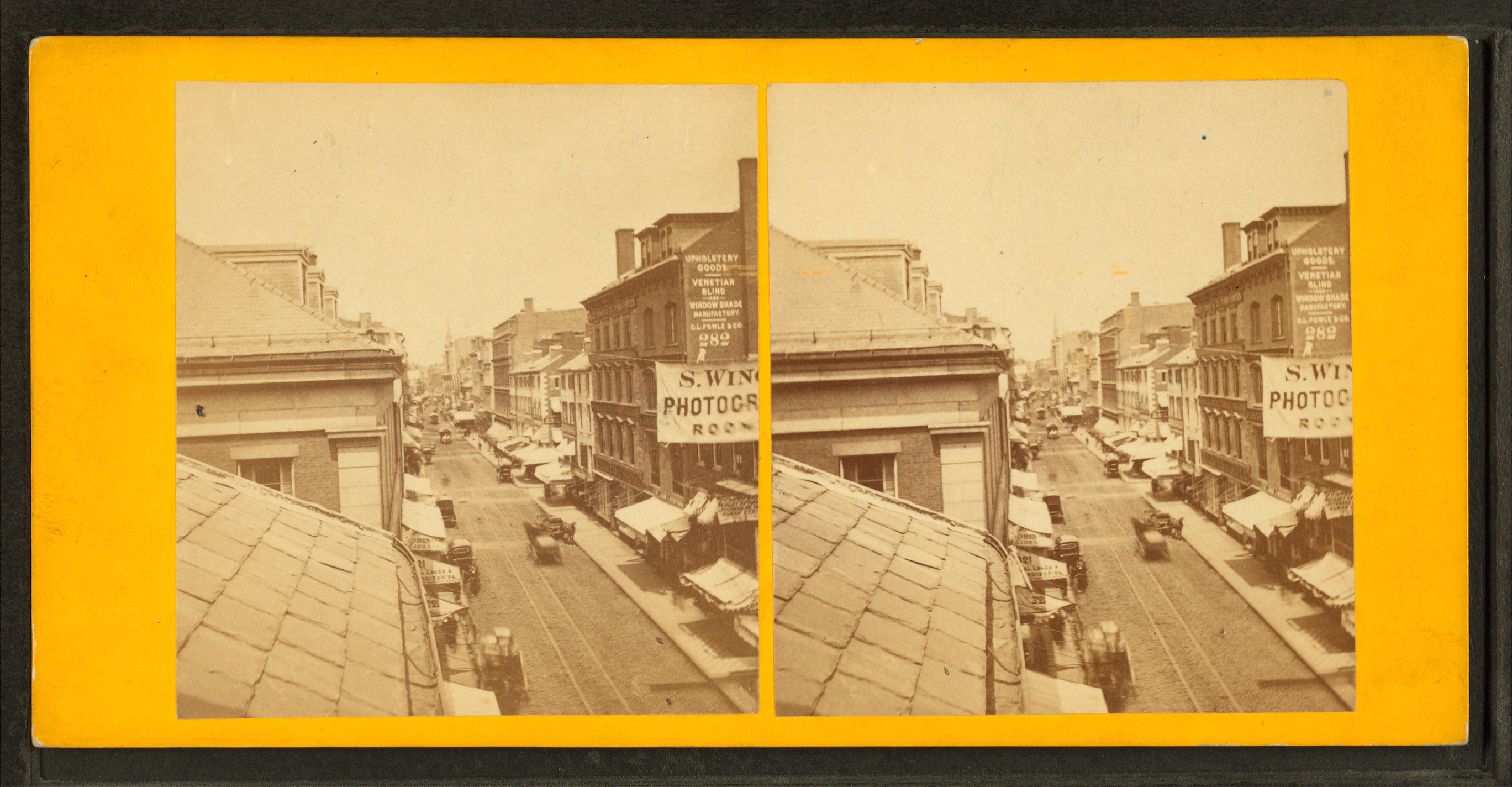
Washington St., Boston, 19th century

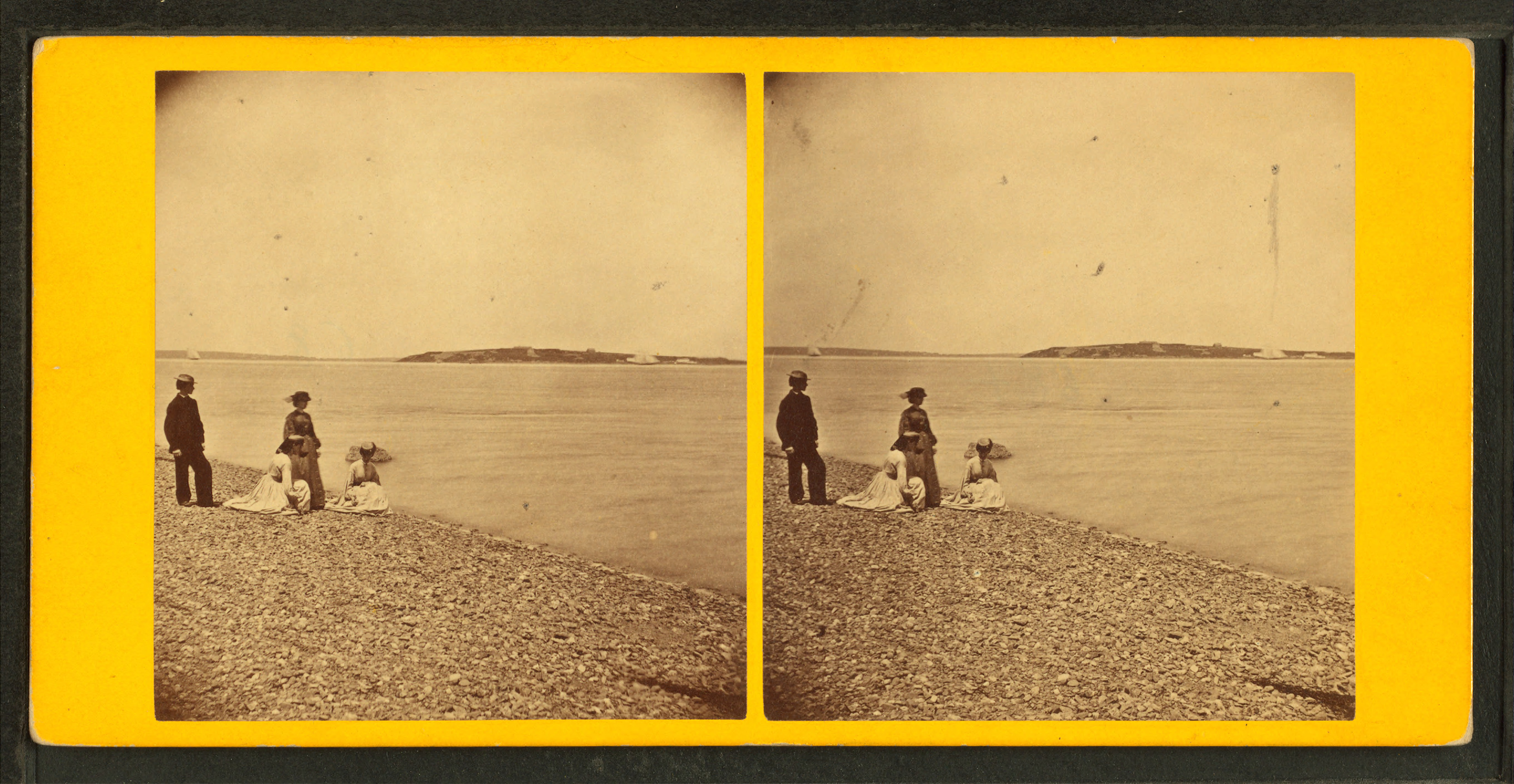
South Boston Point and view of Fort Winthrop, Massachusetts, 19th century
