= James Heywood (politician) =

British politician (1810–1897)

James Heywood FRS

Member of Parliament for North Lancashire
- In office 1847–1857 Serving with John Wilson-Patten
- Preceded by: John Wilson-Patten; John Talbot Clifton
- Succeeded by: John Wilson-Patten; Lord Cavendish of Keighley

Personal details
- Born: 28 May 1810 Everton, Liverpool, England
- Died: 17 October 1897 (aged 87) Kensington, London, England
- Resting place: Barnes Old Cemetery, London
- Party: Liberal
- Spouse: Annie Kennedy (m. 1853; died 1872)
- Relations: Sir Benjamin Heywood, 1st Baronet (brother); Thomas Heywood (brother); Thomas Percival (grandfather)
- Children: 1
- Education: Trinity College, Cambridge
- Occupation: Politician, philanthropist, social reformer, statistician
- Known for: University reform and the abolition of religious tests at Oxford and Cambridge; women's higher education; free public libraries

James Heywood FRS (28 May 1810 – 17 October 1897) was an English Member of Parliament, university reformer, philanthropist and statistician. A Unitarian from a Manchester banking family, he is best remembered as a leading parliamentary advocate of university reform: his motion of April 1850 was the occasion for the appointment of the royal commissions on the universities of Oxford and Cambridge, and in June 1854 he carried the amendment that removed the religious tests excluding Dissenters from matriculating or taking the BA degree at Oxford. Having "secured the admission of dissenters to the universities", he then "worked to make university education available to women", advocating the opening of London degrees to women and serving on the founding committee and council of Girton College. He was also an early promoter of the free public library movement.

== Family and early life ==
Heywood was born in Everton, Liverpool, on 28 May 1810, the fifth son of Nathaniel Heywood, a partner in the Manchester bank of Benjamin Heywood & Sons, and his wife Ann, daughter of the physician Thomas Percival MD FRS. The family was Unitarian and descended from Nathaniel Heywood, a Presbyterian minister ejected from the living of Ormskirk under the Act of Uniformity 1662. His elder brothers were the banker Sir Benjamin Heywood, 1st Baronet and the antiquary Thomas Heywood.

He was educated first at Manchester, then at the Bristol school of the Unitarian minister Lant Carpenter—where James Martineau was a fellow pupil—and at the universities of Edinburgh and Geneva. He entered Heywood's bank at Manchester, but on inheriting a fortune from his uncle B. A. Heywood he gave up banking to return to study, entering Trinity College, Cambridge, in 1829, where William Whewell was his tutor. Ranked twelfth senior optime in the mathematical tripos of 1833, he was, as a Unitarian, debarred from taking his degree by the religious tests then in force. He was called to the bar at the Inner Temple in 1838 but did not practise.

== Anti-Corn Law League and entry to Parliament ==
A radical in politics, Heywood was a member of the Anti-Corn Law League; he became involved from 1843, when he accompanied Richard Cobden to a free-trade demonstration at Doncaster and first met John Bright. Standing as a League candidate, he was returned unopposed as Liberal Member of Parliament for North Lancashire in 1847, alongside the Conservative John Wilson-Patten, and at the request of Lord John Russell moved the Address in reply to the Crown at the opening of the session. He was re-elected in 1852 and sat until the dissolution of 1857.

== Member of Parliament: university reform ==
Reform of the ancient universities, "whose religious and social exclusiveness hindered the diffusion of culture", became Heywood's principal interest. On 23 April 1850 he moved in the House of Commons for a royal commission of inquiry into the universities of Oxford, Cambridge and Dublin, including the religious tests imposed there; the motion was opposed by Sir Robert Inglis, member for Oxford University, who told the House its real object was "not the reform of the Universities, but the admission of Dissenters to them". Although the resolution did not carry, it was the occasion for Russell to announce the appointment of royal commissions into both Oxford and Cambridge, whose work led to the Oxford University Act 1854 and the Cambridge University Act 1856.

The climax of his parliamentary career came in June 1854, when he carried an amendment removing the religious tests for those matriculating or taking the BA degree at Oxford—the relevant clause being passed by 252 votes to 161. A similar amendment to the Cambridge University Bill in June 1856 enabled Heywood himself to graduate BA from his old university in 1857. His campaign formed part of the wider movement that culminated, after he had left Parliament, in the Universities Tests Act 1871. He edited a collection of Cambridge university and college statutes (1840) and funded translations of early Oxford and Cambridge statutes to expose their neglect, as well as compiling published statistics on the state of the English universities.

== Women's education ==
Having "secured the admission of dissenters to the universities", Heywood—who was a supporter of women's suffrage—"worked to make university education available to women". Nominated by the Crown a member of the senate of the University of London, he advocated opening London degrees to women; the university became the first in Britain to admit women to degrees, in 1878. In 1862 he served on the committee, with Emily Davies as secretary and Barbara Bodichon among its members, that secured the admission of women to the Cambridge Local Examinations. He was one of the original members of Emily Davies's committee to found a college for women—which Girton's records date to 1867 and the ODNB to 1869—which led to the establishment of Girton College, and he sat on the college's council from 1872 until his death. According to the college's records, his gift of £152 was the largest single donation from a man in Girton's first years.

== Statistics, science and learned societies ==
After settling in Manchester, Heywood became a leading figure in the city's Unitarian cultural network, his house in Mosley Street often serving as a centre for learned society activity. He was elected in 1833 to the Manchester Literary and Philosophical Society—of which his maternal grandfather had been a founder—and was himself a founder, with Richard Cobden and William Langton, of the Manchester Athenaeum, which opened in 1839 to provide reading rooms and lectures for young men in commercial occupations. A marble medallion of him by John Adams-Acton (1897) is held at the Athenaeum.

A founder of the Manchester Geological Society in 1838, Heywood was elected a Fellow of the Royal Society in 1839 and was a local secretary when the British Association met in Manchester in 1842. He was a fellow of the Statistical Society, a member of the first council of the Chetham Society, and a trustee (1845–1860) of the non-denominational Owens College, the forerunner of the University of Manchester. He was president of the council of the Royal Historical Society from 1878 to 1880, contributing papers to its Transactions on Swiss freedom and the progress of free thought.

== Religion ==
A lifelong Unitarian, Heywood was a trustee of Cross Street Chapel, Manchester, and president (1853–1858) of Manchester New College. He was chairman (1840, 1849) and president (1866–67) of the British and Foreign Unitarian Association and a trustee of Dr Williams's Library. After moving to London he was active in the Notting Hill Unitarian congregation that became Essex Church, where his funeral was held. In 1875 he offered a prize for the best essay urging the disuse of the Athanasian Creed, won jointly by the future MP Courtney Stanhope Kenny.

== Libraries, the Sunday Society and later life ==
From 1859 Heywood was resident in Kensington. An early promoter of the free public library movement, he spoke in favour of the Public Libraries Act 1850 and from 1874 maintained at his own expense a public library in Notting Hill High Street, which in 1887 he donated to the parish of Kensington. He was a founder member in 1875 of the Sunday Society, formed to promote the opening of museums, art galleries and public libraries on Sundays.

== Personal life ==
In June 1853 Heywood married Annie (d. 1872), daughter of John Kennedy of Ardwick Hall, Lancashire, and widow of Gustav Albert Escher of Zürich. They had one daughter, Anne Sophia. The couple were resident from 1859 in Kensington.

== Death ==
Heywood died at his London home, 26 Kensington Palace Gardens, on 17 October 1897, aged 87, and was buried in Barnes Old Cemetery. He left an estate of £61,745.

== Selected publications ==
- A Collection of Statutes for the University and the Colleges of Cambridge (1840)
- The Ancient Laws of the Fifteenth Century for King's College, Cambridge, and for the Public School of Eton College (with Thomas Wright, 1850)
- A History of University Subscription Tests (1853)
- Cambridge University Transactions during the Puritan Controversies (1854)
- Early Cambridge University and College Statutes (1855)
- Academical Reform and University Representation (1860)
- The Primæval World of Switzerland (English edition of Oswald Heer, 1876)

Parliament of the United Kingdom
Preceded by John Wilson-Patten; John Talbot Clifton	Member of Parliament for North Lancashire; 1847–1857; With: John Wilson-Patten	Succeeded by John Wilson-Patten; Lord Cavendish of Keighley
