= Religious test =

A religious test is a legal requirement to swear faith to a specific religion or sect, or to renounce the same.

== In the United Kingdom ==
=== British Test Acts of 1673 and 1678 ===
The Test Act 1673 in England obligated all persons filling any office, civil or military, to take oaths of supremacy and allegiance, to subscribe to a declaration against transubstantiation, and to receive the sacrament within three months of taking office.

The oath for the Test Act 1673 was:

I, N, do declare that I do believe that there is not any transubstantion in the sacrament of the Lord's Supper, or in the elements of the bread and wine, at or after the consecration thereof by any person whatsovever.

In 1678 the act was extended thus:

I, N, do solemnly and sincerely in the presence of God profess, testify, and declare, that I do believe that in the Sacrament of the Lord's Supper there is not any Transubstantiation of the elements of bread and wine into the Body and Blood of Christ at or after the consecration thereof by any person whatsoever: and that the invocation or adoration of the Virgin Mary or any other Saint, and the Sacrifice of the Mass, as they are now used in the Church of Rome, are superstitious and idolatrous...

=== Roman Catholic Relief Act 1829 ===
The necessity of receiving the sacrament as a qualification for office was abolished under George IV, and all acts requiring the taking of oaths and declarations against transubstantiation etc. were repealed by the Roman Catholic Relief Act 1829.

=== University requirement for master's degree ===
Until 1871 a religious test was still necessary at the University of Oxford before a master's Degree could be conferred, but there is now no religious test associated with any degree. However, religious tests are still required for admission to certain holy orders.

=== Religious test for a Monarch ===
The Sovereign of the United Kingdom is, in effect, required to take a religious test, as a result of the Coronation Oath Act 1688, Bill of Rights 1688, Act of Settlement 1701, and the Accession Declaration Act 1910.

== In the United States ==
Mandatory religious tests in the United States are banned by the No Religious Test Clause by Article VI of the United States Constitution, which states "no religious test shall ever be required as a qualification to any office or public trust under the United States." At first the prohibition was interpreted as applying only to federal office, and many of the states continued to apply religious tests, typically limiting public office to those who professed their belief in Protestantism, Christianity, or a divine power. In 1961 the United States Supreme Court heard a challenge to a clause in the Maryland State Constitution that required "a declaration of belief in the existence of God" in order for a person to hold "any office of profit or trust in this State". The court overturned that requirement and declared that religious tests cannot be required for state or federal office, basing their decision on the First and Fourteenth amendments. While it remains common practice for government officials to take their oath of office with their hand on a Bible, this practice is no longer required.

Many U.S. states including New Jersey, Delaware and Virginia explicitly ban the usage of religious tests in their own constitutions. Eight states continue to have a religious test in their constitutions, but the clause is inoperable and unenforceable because of the 1961 Supreme Court decision.

== See also ==
- Separation of church and state
- Freedom of religion
