= Thomas Heywood (antiquarian) =

English antiquarian (1797–1866)

Thomas Heywood (1797–1866) was an English antiquarian. He was closely involved in the Chetham Society and its publications.

== Early life ==
The son of Nathaniel Heywood (died 1815) of Heywood's Bank and his wife Anne Percival, daughter of Thomas Percival, and younger brother of Benjamin Heywood, he was born in Manchester on 3 September 1797; James Heywood was his younger brother. He was educated at Manchester Grammar School. He graduated B.A. from Glasgow University in 1815.

Heywood was from 1818 a partner in Heywood's Bank, called the Manchester Bank and, from 1795, Heywood Brothers & Co., with his father's surviving brother Benjamin Arthur Heywood (died 1828), Benjamin, and (from 1820) Richard Heywood, another brother. He served the office of boroughreeve of Salford in 1826. In 1828 Thomas and Richard Heywood left the family business, which was carried on by Benjamin.

== At Hope End ==
Thomas Heywood purchased Hope End, a mansion in Herefordshire, near Ledbury. It was sold in 1832 by Edward Moulton-Barrett, father of Elizabeth Barrett Browning who had lived there as a child; the sale was by auction on 25 August. Heywood went there to live, and was high sheriff of Herefordshire in 1840.

Heywood died at Hope End on 20 November 1866. Before leaving Manchester Heywood collected a library of local books, which was dispersed in a sale in 1835. His general library was sold at Manchester in 1868. The house at Hope End was sold in 1867 to C. A. Hewitt. It was demolished in the 1870s; its stable block eventually became a hotel.

== Works ==
Heywood was an early member of the council of the Chetham Society, and edited the following of its publications:

- The Norris Papers, 1846.
- The Moore Rental, 1847. This work relates to the rented property of the Moore family of Liverpool, and was compiled by Edward Moore, son of John Moore the regicide.
- The Diary of the Rev. Henry Newcome, 1849.
- Cardinal Allen's Defence of Sir William Stanley's Surrender of Deventer, 1851.
- On the South Lancashire Dialect, 1862.
- Letter from Sir John Seton, dated 1643, 1862.

For the Historic Society of Lancashire and Cheshire he wrote a notice of the family of Percival of Allerton, Lancashire (Trans. vol. i.), and a description of an old Chester document (vol. v.).

In 1826 Heywood printed a pamphlet on The Earls of Derby and the Verse Writers of the Sixteenth and Seventeenth Centuries, Manchester; it was reprinted in 1853 by the Chetham Society. In 1829 he annotated and printed The most Pleasant Song of Lady Bessy, the eldest Daughter of King Edward the Fourth.

== Family ==
Heywood married in 1823 Mary Elizabeth, daughter of the merchant John Barton (1770–1831) of Swinton, Lancashire, owner of Saxby Hall. Mary Elizabeth Sumner, founder of the Mothers' Union was their daughter. She married George Henry Sumner. They had another daughter, Margaret, who married her first cousin Sir Thomas Percival Heywood, 2nd Baronet, and a son Thomas (1826–1915), whose first wife was Mary Emily Beresford, daughter of Marcus Beresford. Margaret became a Catholic convert.
