= Heywood baronets =

Baronetcy in the Baronetage of the United Kingdom

Escutcheon of the Heywood baronets

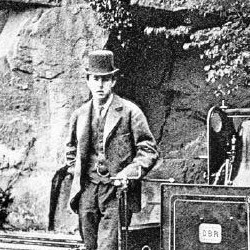
Sir Arthur Heywood, 3rd Baronet

The Heywood Baronetcy, of Claremont in the County Palatine of Lancaster, is a title in the Baronetage of the United Kingdom. It was created on 9 August 1838 for the banker, politician and philanthropist Benjamin Heywood. He had been instrumental in the passage of the 1832 Reform Act. The second Baronet was High Sheriff of Lancashire in 1851. The third Baronet was a railway entrepreneur and served as High Sheriff of Derbyshire in 1899. The fourth Baronet was High Sheriff of Staffordshire in 1922. The fifth Baronet was an artist.

== Heywood baronets, of Claremont (1838) ==
- Sir Benjamin Heywood, 1st Baronet (1793–1865)
- Sir Thomas Percival Heywood, 2nd Baronet (15 March 1823 – 26 October 1897)
- Sir Arthur Percival Heywood, 3rd Baronet (1849–1916)
- Sir (Graham) Percival Heywood, CB, DSO, 4th Baronet (1878–1946)
- Sir Oliver Kerr Heywood, 5th Baronet (1920–1992)
- Sir Peter Heywood, 6th Baronet (born 1947)

The heir presumptive to the baronetcy is Michael Heywood (born 1947), younger twin brother of the 6th Baronet. His heir apparent is his son Daniel Oliver Heywood (born 1979).

== Extended family ==
Oliver Heywood, younger son of the first Baronet, was a banker and philanthropist. Cecil Percival Heywood, second son of the third Baronet and father of the fifth Baronet, was a Major-General in the Army. The Right Reverend Bernard Heywood, son of Reverend Henry Robinson, fifth son of the first Baronet, was Bishop of Ely.

== See also ==
- Heywood's Bank

Baronetage of the United Kingdom
Preceded by Roche baronets	Heywood baronets of Claremont; 9 August 1838	Succeeded by Worsley baronets
