= Samuel R. Heywood =

American businessman

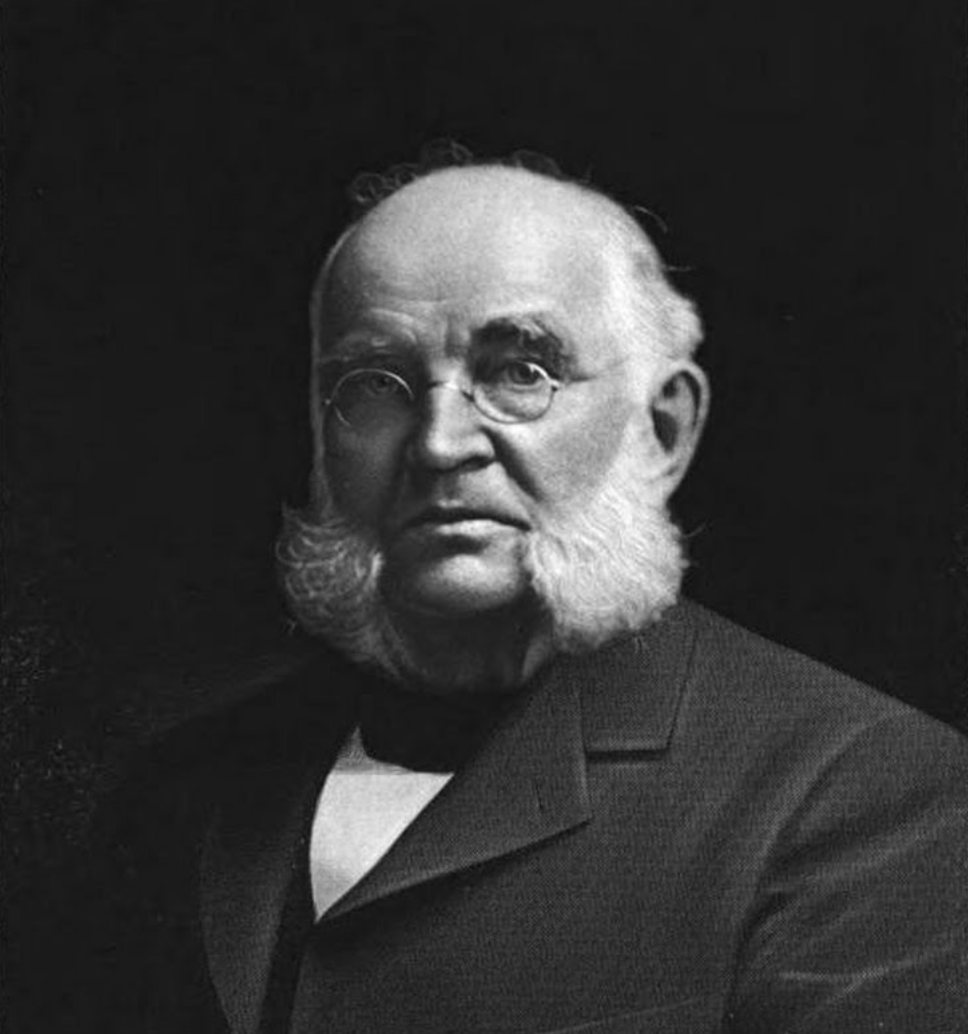
- Born: November 14, 1821; Princeton, Massachusetts, US
- Died: May 27, 1913 (aged 91); Worcester, Massachusetts, US
- Known for: Heywood Boot & Shoe Company
- Spouse: Harriet Butler Millkien (m. 1856)
- Children: 5

Samuel Richardson Heywood (1821-1913) was an American businessman, and founder of the Heywood Boot & Shoe Company in Worcester, Massachusetts.

== Early life ==
Heywood was born on November 14, 1821, in Princeton, Massachusetts, to Ezra and Dorcas Hoar. The family name was changed from Hoar to Heywood by an act of legislature in May 1848. Heywood was one of nine children, and was raised on a farm on the side of Mount Wachusett. In August 1848, he started the firm of Heywood & Warren in Hubbardston before buying out his partner and moving to Worcester in 1855. Heywood entered into a partnership with E. A. Goodnow in the wholesale and retail boot and shoe trade. The retail business was taken over by Heywood, who continued it until 1864, when he began to manufacture boots and shoes.

== Heywood Boot & Shoe Company ==
In 1884, the Heywood Boot & Shoe Company was incorporated, with Heywood as president. The main Heywood factory was built in 1879 on Winter Street, and was considered the largest and best equipped of its time. The factory had the capacity to make 1,000 pairs of shoes a day.

== Personal life and death ==
In addition to serving as president of the Heywood Boot and Shoe Company, Heywood served as a member of the City Council in 1859, 1872, and 1873. He was also a member of the Plymouth Congregational Church. Heywood married Harriet Butler Milliken in 1856, and had five children. His older son Frank E. Heywood served as Treasurer of the Heywood Boot and Shoe Company, and his younger son, Albert S., graduated from Massachusetts Institute of Technology in 1892.

Heywood died in Worcester on May 27, 1913.
