= Oliver Heywood =

English banker and philanthropist

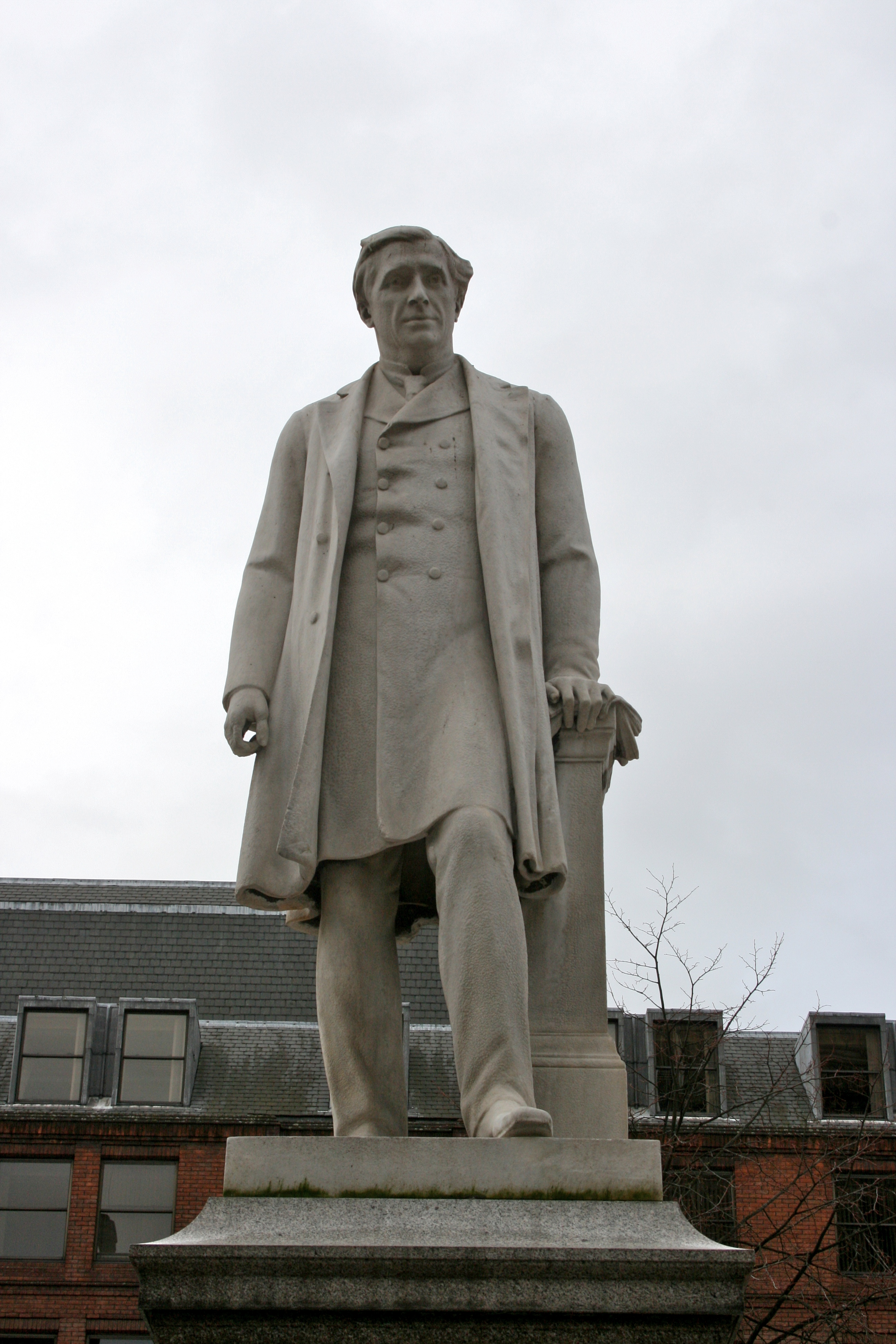
- Grade II listed statue of Heywood in Albert Square, Manchester
- Born: 9 September 1825; Lancashire, England
- Died: 1892 (aged 66–67)
- Occupation: British banker
- Spouse: Eleanor Barton (m. 1847)
- Children: None

Oliver Heywood (9 September 1825 – 1892) was an English banker and philanthropist.

Born in Irlams O' Th' Height, Lancashire, the son of Benjamin Heywood, and educated at Eton College, Heywood joined the family business, Heywood's Bank in the 1840s.

Heywood sponsored many philanthropic causes, including Manchester Mechanics' Institute, Chetham's Hospital, Manchester Grammar School and Owens College. He was selected as High Sheriff of Lancashire for 1888.

He married Eleanor Barton, daughter of Richard Watson Barton, on 7 September 1847; they had no children.

== Life ==
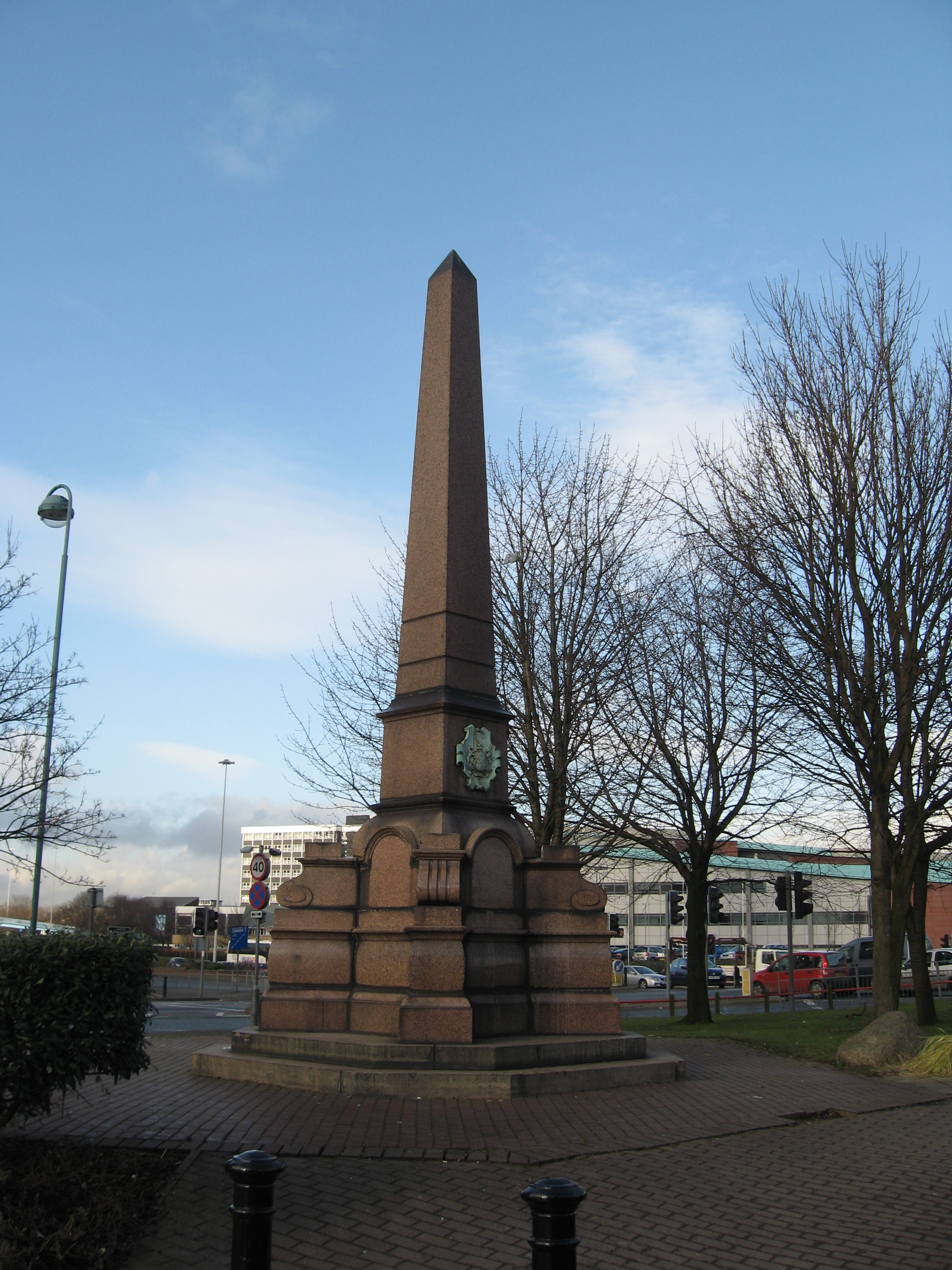
Oliver Heywood Memorial in Salford

On 9 September 1825, Oliver Heywood was born in Irlams O' Th' Height near Manchester, England to the prominent English banker and well known philanthropist Sir Benjamin Heywood and his wife Sophia Ann Robinson. Located in St. Ann's Square, the Heywood bank was one of the more recognisable bank names in Manchester but had suffered some tarnishing of its image from the 1700s.

Heywood was educated in Liverpool at St. Domingo House, at the time, a boarding school for boys that was housed by a large mansion. He then was educated at Mr. Mertz's School in Manchester and then at Eton College for his higher education. Heywood followed the finishing of his formal education by travelling abroad before beginning his very promising career in the family banking business.

On 7 September 1847, Heywood married Eleanor Barton, the daughter of a merchant from Pendlebury named Richard Watson Barton. The couple first lived in Acresfield in the house where Heywood had been born in Irlams O' Th' Height near Manchester. However, after the death of Sir Benjamin Heywood in 1865, the couple moved into his house in nearby Claremont. Eleanor died childless in September 1877.

=== Slavery ===
The Heywood family fortune had ties to the trans-Atlantic slave trade. Oliver Heywood's great-grandfather, Benjamin Heywood, was one of the family that had lived in Liverpool, where they owned a shipping company in the 1700s. This transported goods made in Manchester to West Africa, where they were traded for African slaves who were then taken to Barbados. There the slaves were traded in turn for sugar and cotton, which were landed in Liverpool on the ships' return voyage. The slave trade was lucrative but eventually recognised as unscrupulous. It was from this activity that Benjamin Heywood had been able to establish the family bank in Manchester in 1788.

=== Business ===
In 1845, Heywood joined his father's banking company, called Sir Benjamin Heywood & Co.. In 1847, he was made a partner in the company, as also later were his three younger brothers. In 1860, upon the retirement of his father, Oliver became the senior partner of the bank, which was then renamed as Heywood Brothers & Co.

Under Oliver Heywood's leadership, the bank fulfilled his father's legacy within the business; the bank kept its reputation that it had earned for reliability and prudence. These two particular qualities would prove to be both tested, then after reaffirmed, to be defining for the bank's survival during the financial crisis of 1866, which was spurred by the collapse of an old and prestigious banking firm "Overend, Gurney & Co."; this major bankruptcy caused a serious panic within the English banking sector.

Oliver Heywood was in London at the time when the crisis first struck. He witnessed all the panic that had ensued after the bankruptcy of Overend, Gurney & Co.; the entire banking sector in London was in chaos. Heywood's first instinct was to hurry home to Manchester to check on the firm: luckily everything at the firm had been copacetic, just how he left it. The firm's well-weathering of the financial crisis of 1866 is largely given credit to how Heywood managed his company, he was reliable and prudent. Never taking a risk that was too dangerous or that would over-extend the firm financially.

In 1876, Oliver Heywood would remain the senior partner of Heywood Brothers & Co. until the firm was acquired by Manchester & Salford Bank. As part of the agreement made in the acquisition, there was an arrangement that Heywood and his three younger brothers would continue to hold high ranking positions in Manchester & Salford Bank. The arrangement made Heywood and his brothers directors in the new firm.

In 1878, Heywood had retired all his obligations, beyond being a shareholder, to the Manchester & Salford Bank. This virtually meant that he stopped attending the board meetings that were required of a member of the Board of Directors; and in turn was not re-elected to the firm's board. Heywood's reasoning for no longer attending the board meetings came from a place of disapproval with the firm's general manager Thomas Read Wilkinson's recent acquisition. Wilkinson had made the decision to purchase Hardcastle, Cross & Co., the bank that was located in Bolton.

=== Philanthropy ===
Oliver Heywood's family bank was very successful during the Victorian era. The prosperity from the Heywood Bank rewarded the family handsomely, the amount of wealth Heywood was receiving allowed him to have more time and focus on charitable and philanthropic work. These righteous pursuits also included but were not only limited to liberal causes in Salford and Manchester. Heywood's philanthropic interests had a particular focus in education. He started off supporting and financing for projects to erect and establish working men's colleges. Heywood even assisted his resources to help erect and establish the Owens College, which eventually became a forerunner of the University of Manchester. Heywood's philanthropic pursuits were looked at as very admirable considering that many of his contemporaries were uninterested in public duties. His contemporaries, or other people with substantial wealth, were moving out of the grimy cities to the more desirable country manor or suburban areas. Since a large portion of the wealthy were no longer living in the cities, this meant that consequently this sect of the wealthy was also less interested in providing charity for a community that they no longer inhabited. Heywood, deciding to stay in Manchester, and with his very generous inclinations, was very prone to provide a little extra to his community's needs.

Some of Heywood's contributions and support he led to education were mainly in Manchester and included: Victoria University, Owens College, Manchester Grammar School, Manchester High School for Girls, Hulme Grammar School, Manchester Technical School, Manchester School Board, Salford School Board, and the Association for the Promotion of Technical Education in the Manchester District.

Heywood also provided his support and contributed to the healthcare organisations and facilities of Manchester, these include: Hospital for Sick Children, St Mary's Hospital, Manchester Royal Infirmary, Salford Royal Hospital, the Royal Eye Hospital Manchester, the Royal Asylum, and the Provident Dispensaries Association.

Heywood was passionate and often locally involved to the best of his capacity towards, what was then considered, "Progressive Causes". He was a staunch supporter of the Anti-Slavery movement in England, and in turn, the world. It was not considered rare or bizarre to find Heywood at local Anti-Slavery meetings in Manchester. One of the more notable meetings, held in November 1872, recorded Heywood in attendance; it was focused on the stopping of the African slave trade that was being carried out in East Africa.

Heywood's father, Sir Benjamin Heywood, was a parliamentary representative during the 1830s. Despite Heywood's father's political legacy and his own public record of charity and public service, Heywood never took a career in politics seriously.

=== Legacy ===
In 1888, Heywood's public work and sacrifice was acknowledged by the city of Manchester making him the city's first Honorary Freeman. On 17 March 1892, he died in his home. He was buried at St. John's church in Pendlebury. The funeral ceremony was vast and impressive: The bishops of Guildford and Manchester both conducted the service where thousands of people showed up to pay their respects and 150 carriages were used. On the afternoon of Heywood's funeral, shops in Irlams O' Th' Height and Pendlebury closed in his honour.

It was decided to erect a marble statue in commemoration and to place it in Albert Square, Manchester. The commission was given to Albert Bruce-Joy, with the £2600 cost being met by contributions from 332 donors. Bruce-Joy had previously sculpted a statue of John Bright in Albert Square and the committee overseeing the Heywood memorial believed that his statue of Heywood would complement that of Bright. It was unveiled in December 1894 and bears the inscription that his life was one "devoted to the public good".

== Honours ==
- First Honorary Freeman of the City of Manchester, 1888
- Memorial in Salford unveiled on 20 October 1893
- A grade II listed statue by Albert Bruce-Joy stands in Albert Square, Manchester, unveiled 1894.

Honorary titles
Preceded by Sir John Thursby	High Sheriff of Lancashire; 1888	Succeeded by Clement Molyneux Royds
