= Benjamin Heywood =

British politician (1793–1865)

Sir Benjamin Heywood Bt FRS
- Born: 12 December 1793; Manchester, England
- Died: 11 August 1865 (aged 71)
- Occupation: Banker
- Children: 3 sons
- Parent(s): Nathaniel Heywood; Ann Percival
- Relatives: Thomas Percival (maternal grandfather); James Heywood (brother)

Sir Benjamin Heywood, 1st Baronet Bt FRS (12 December 1793 – 11 August 1865) was an English banker and philanthropist.

== Early life ==
Benjamin Heywood was born on 12 December 1793 in St Ann's Square, Manchester. He was the grandson of Thomas Percival, the son of Nathaniel Heywood and Ann Percival, the brother to Thomas Heywood and James Heywood, and the nephew to Samuel Heywood. He lived at "Claremont" to the north west of the city centre in Irlams o' th' Height. He graduated from the University of Glasgow.

== Career ==
Heywood entered his father's bank becoming a partner in 1814 and sole proprietor in 1828. He was an enthusiast for workers' education and was a founder of the Manchester Mechanics' Institute, serving as its president from 1825 until 1840. Heywood briefly served as Member of Parliament for Lancashire from 1831 until 1832, receiving his baronetcy in recognition of his work in support of the 1832 Reform Bill. He was also active in the Manchester Statistical Society.

== Personal life ==
The family had a strong affinity with the south Derbyshire and Staffordshire area and bought a summer retreat at Dove Leys, near Denstone (When the Claremont area (Irlams o' th' Height) of Pendleton, Salford, was built up, many of the streets were given names such as Duffield Road, Doveleys Road, Denstone Road, among others.)

He was the father of:

- Sir Thomas Percival Heywood, 2nd Baronet;
- Oliver Heywood; and
- Rev. R.H. Heywood.

== Philanthropy ==
In 1864, Heywood provided the gift of £100 (equivalent to £9,585 in 2025) to the Royal National Lifeboat Institution (RNLI), to be used towards the construction of a boathouse for the new lifeboat station in Blackpool. The building, at the junction of Lytham Road and Bolton Street, was in use by the RNLI until 1936, but still stands to this day.

== Honours ==
- Baronet, (1838)
- Elected to the Manchester Literary and Philosophical Society on 27 January 1815. Treasurer of the Society 1815–50
- Fellow of the Royal Society, (1843)

== See also ==
- Heywood's Bank

== Bibliography ==
- Leigh Rayment's Historical List of MPs
- Leigh Rayment's list of baronets
- Heywood, T. (1888). A Memoir of Sir Benjamin Heywood.
- McConnell, A. (2004) "Heywood, Sir Benjamin, first baronet (1793–1865)", Oxford Dictionary of National Biography, Oxford University Press, Retrieved 10 Aug 2007 (subscription required)

Parliament of the United Kingdom
Preceded by John Wilson-Patten and Edward Smith-Stanley, Baron Stanley	Member of Parliament for Lancashire; 1831–1832; With: Edward Smith-Stanley, Baron Stanley	Constituency abolished
Baronetage of the United Kingdom
New creation	Baronet (of Claremont, Lancashire); 1838–1865	Succeeded by Thomas Percival Heywood
Professional and academic associations
Preceded by Nathaniel Heywood	Treasurer of the Manchester Literary and Philosophical Society; 1815–50	Succeeded by George Wareing Ormerod
Preceded by Creation	President of the Manchester Statistical Society; 1833–34	Succeeded by Lt-Col. Shaw Kennedy
