= Mothers' Union =

International Christian charity

- Founded: 1876
- Founder: Mary Sumner
- Type: Charity
- Purpose: Supporting family life
- Method: Prayer, social outreach, campaigning, lobbying
- Website: mothersunion.org

The Mothers' Union is an international Christian charity that seeks to support families worldwide. In addition to mothers, its membership includes parents, men, widows, singles and grandparents. Its main aim is to support monogamous marriage and family life, especially through times of adversity.

== History ==
The organisation was founded by Mary Sumner in 1876 in the Church of England parish of Old Alresford, near Winchester, where her husband was rector. She was inspired to start the movement after the birth of her first grandchild. Remembering her own difficulties when she was first a mother, Sumner wanted to bring mothers of all social classes together to provide support for one another and to be trained in motherhood, something which she saw as a vocation.

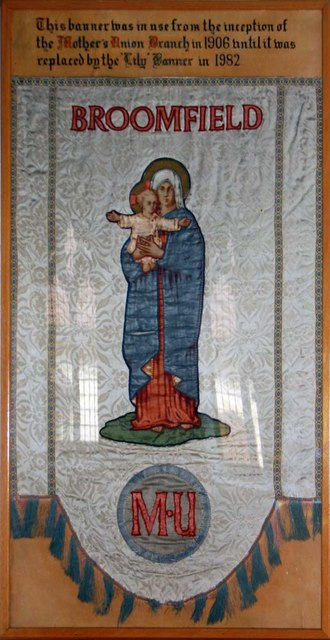
Banner made in 1906 for the Mothers' Union of St Mary's parish church, Broomfield, Essex

In 1885 Ernest Roland Wilberforce, the first Bishop of Newcastle, was preparing to address churchgoing women at the Portsmouth Church Congress. Finding he had nothing relevant to say to churchwomen, he contacted Mary Sumner and asked her to speak to the conference in his stead. Although she was reluctant and beset by nervousness, she addressed the women passionately about the power of mothers to change the nation for the better. A number of the women present were encouraged to return to their parishes to set up similar women's meetings, and the Bishop of Winchester, who presided over the congress, declared that the Mothers' Union become a diocesan organisation. The growth of the movement beyond the boundary of the Diocese of Winchester was due to the emphasis in Victorian British society on morality and contending with social ills as well as the growth in Anglican mission throughout the British Empire.

The Mothers' Union spread rapidly to the dioceses of Ely, Exeter, Hereford, Lichfield and Newcastle, and then throughout the United Kingdom. By 1892, there were 60,000 members in 28 dioceses, which grew to 169,000 members by the turn of the century. In 1893, annual general meetings were organised, and, in 1896, the Mothers' Union Central Council was formed. Mary Sumner was unanimously elected president, a post she held into her nineties. In 1897, during her Diamond Jubilee, Queen Victoria became patron of the Mothers' Union, giving it an unprecedented stamp of approval. It set up branches throughout the British Empire, beginning in New Zealand, then Canada and India. She lived to see the first Mothers' Union Conference of Overseas Workers in 1920. Subsequent patrons have included Queen Elizabeth The Queen Mother, Queen Elizabeth II and Sophie, Duchess of Edinburgh.

== Present ==
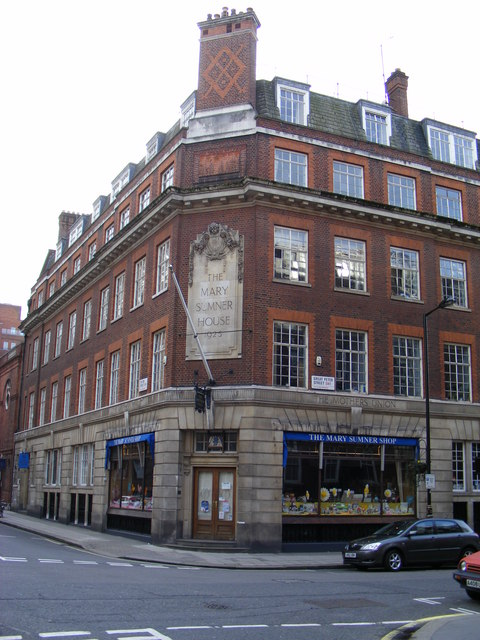
Mary Sumner House, the Mothers' Union headquarters, Tufton Street, London

As a global movement of women and men, the Mothers' Union supports local churches with the prayers and activities of its branch members, local communities through social outreach projects and is an international campaigning charity. Particularly concerned with the plight of women in the world, its projects include literacy and development, parenting, micro finance and campaigning against violence against women and the trafficking of women. The Mothers' Union is part of Make Poverty History and the Jubilee Debt Coalition. In the UK it has successfully lobbied governments to introduce the right to request flexible working for all parents, and internationally it speaks out on issues of gender equality through its representative status at the United Nations. Campaigning in the UK has also included lobbying for industry and policy change with regard to the commercialisation and sexualisation of children. This led to then chief executive, Reg Bailey, being appointed in 2010 to lead an independent review for the UK Government, the Bailey Review.

Of its four million members, about 1.9 million are from Indian dioceses from the formerly independent churchwomen's organisations of the Church of North India and the Church of South India, which affiliated with the Mothers' Union in 2001 and 2003 respectively. A further 1.3 million Mothers' Union members are in African dioceses, with the largest membership, 680,000, in Tanzania. Membership in the United Kingdom is about 93,000 and has seen rapid declines from 122,000 in 2003 and more than 222,000 in 1993.

== Aim and objectives ==
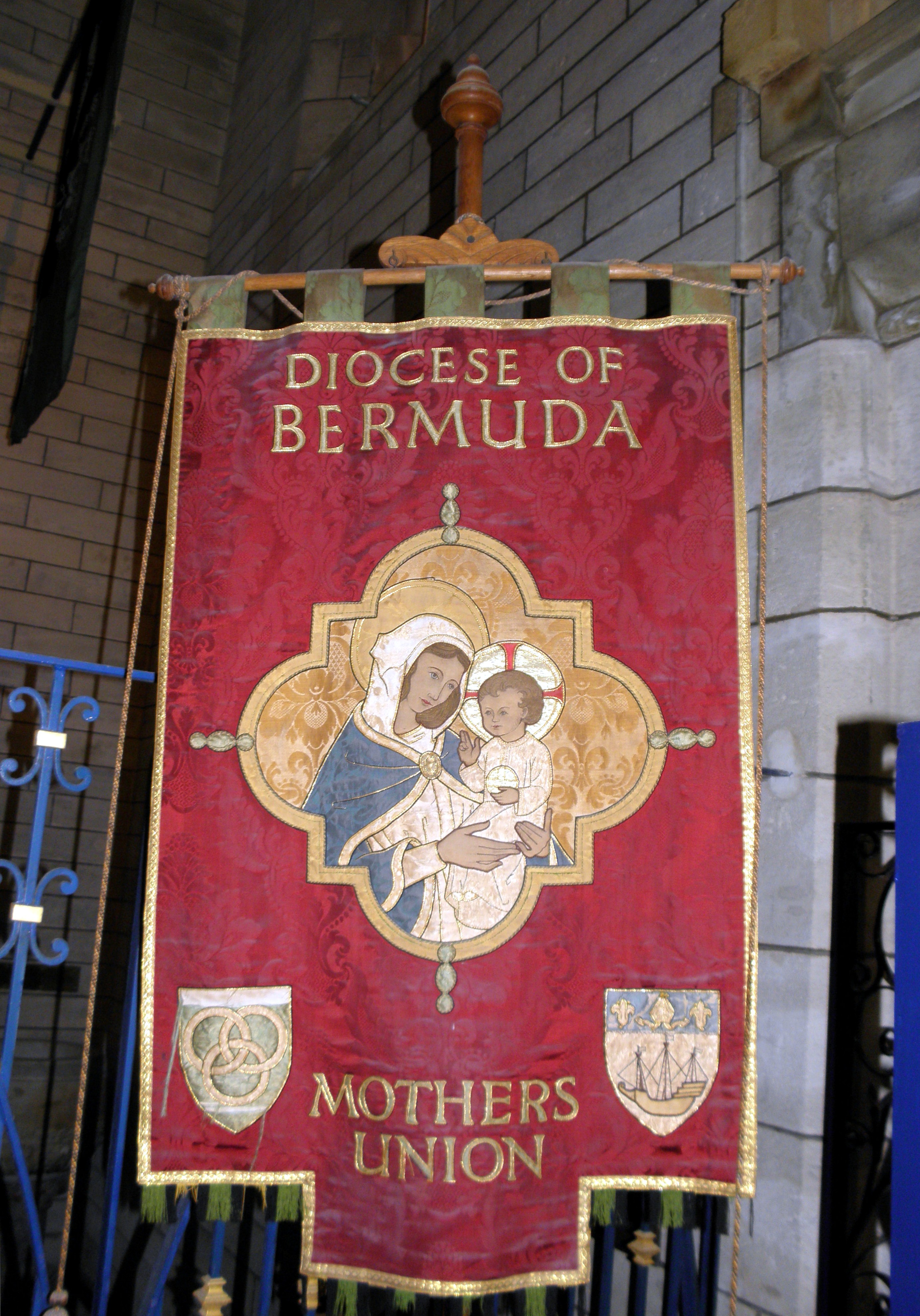
Mothers' Union banner of the Diocese of Bermuda

The Mothers' Union publishes its vision statement on its website:

Its vision is of a world where God's love is shown through loving, respectful, and flourishing relationships.

Its declared aim and purpose is: "to demonstrate the Christian faith in action by the transformation of communities worldwide through the nurture of the family in its many forms."

In order to carry out this aim, Mothers' Union's objectives are:

- To uphold Christ's teaching on the nature of marriage and promote its wider understanding.
- To encourage parents to bring up their children in the faith and life of the Church.
- To maintain a worldwide fellowship of Christians united in prayer, worship and service.
- To promote conditions in society favourable to stable family life and the protection of children.
- To help those whose family life has met with adversity.

== Structure ==
The Mothers' Union developed within the Anglican Communion and uses its structure as its own. Individual branches are usually based on parishes or small groups of parishes. There are often levels of co-ordination corresponding to deaneries and archdeaconries, that link the branch organisations with that of the diocese. The Anglican provinces each have their own administration, which, in turn, supports the worldwide president, currently Kathleen Snow from Canada.

Mary Sumner House at 24, Tufton Street, Westminster in London is the worldwide headquarters. The Grade II listed building of 1925 was designed by Claude Ferrier. The Mary Sumner Chapel is housed within.

== Prayer ==
The Mothers' Union emphasises the importance of prayer underpinning its work. Each year it organises a Wave of Prayer. Each diocese is given a set day to pray for other dioceses, and within each diocese each branch is given a specific time to pray. This gives to members a sense of unity in prayer for one another as the wave of prayer moves from branch to branch and from diocese to diocese.

== See also ==
- Women's Institute
