= St Andrew's Church, Farnham =

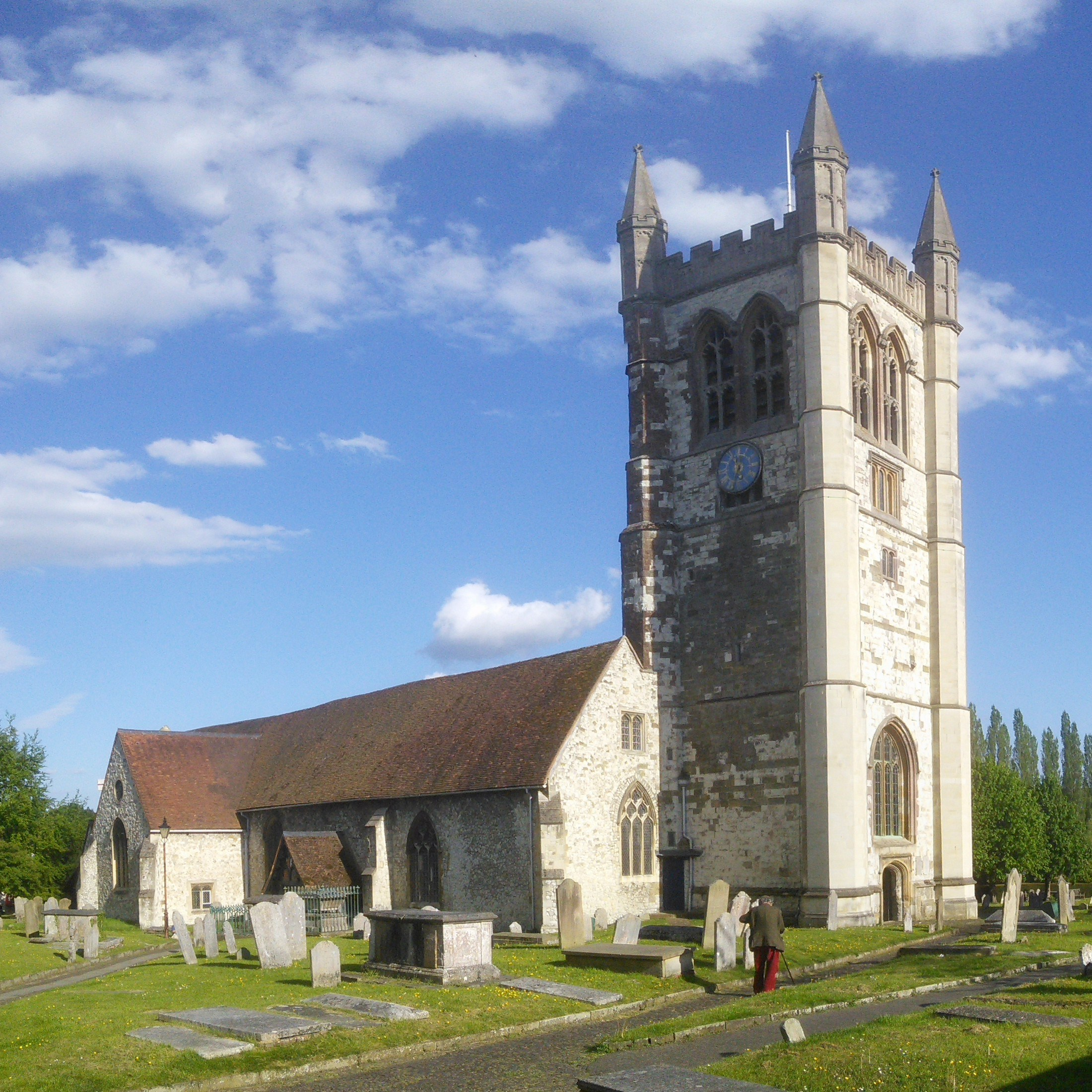
- The church from the northwest

- Location in Surrey
- 51°12′48″N 0°48′03″W
- OS grid reference: SU 83866 46680
- Location: Farnham, Surrey
- Country: England
- Denomination: Anglican
- Website: StAndrewsFarnham.org

History
- Status: Parish church
- Dedication: Saint Andrew
- Consecrated: 1399

Architecture
- Functional status: Active
- Heritage designation: Grade I
- Designated: 5 March 2015

Administration
- Province: Canterbury
- Diocese: Guildford
- Archdeaconry: Surrey
- Deanery: Farnham

Clergy
- Bishop: Rt. Rev. Andrew Watson

St Andrew's Church is an Anglican parish church in the centre of Farnham, Surrey. It is a Grade I listed building and surviving parts of the structure date back to the Middle Ages. It is in the Archdeaconry of Surrey, in the Diocese of Guildford. The churchyard contains the grave of the political activist William Cobbett, and there is a memorial to the hymn-writer Augustus Toplady.

== History ==
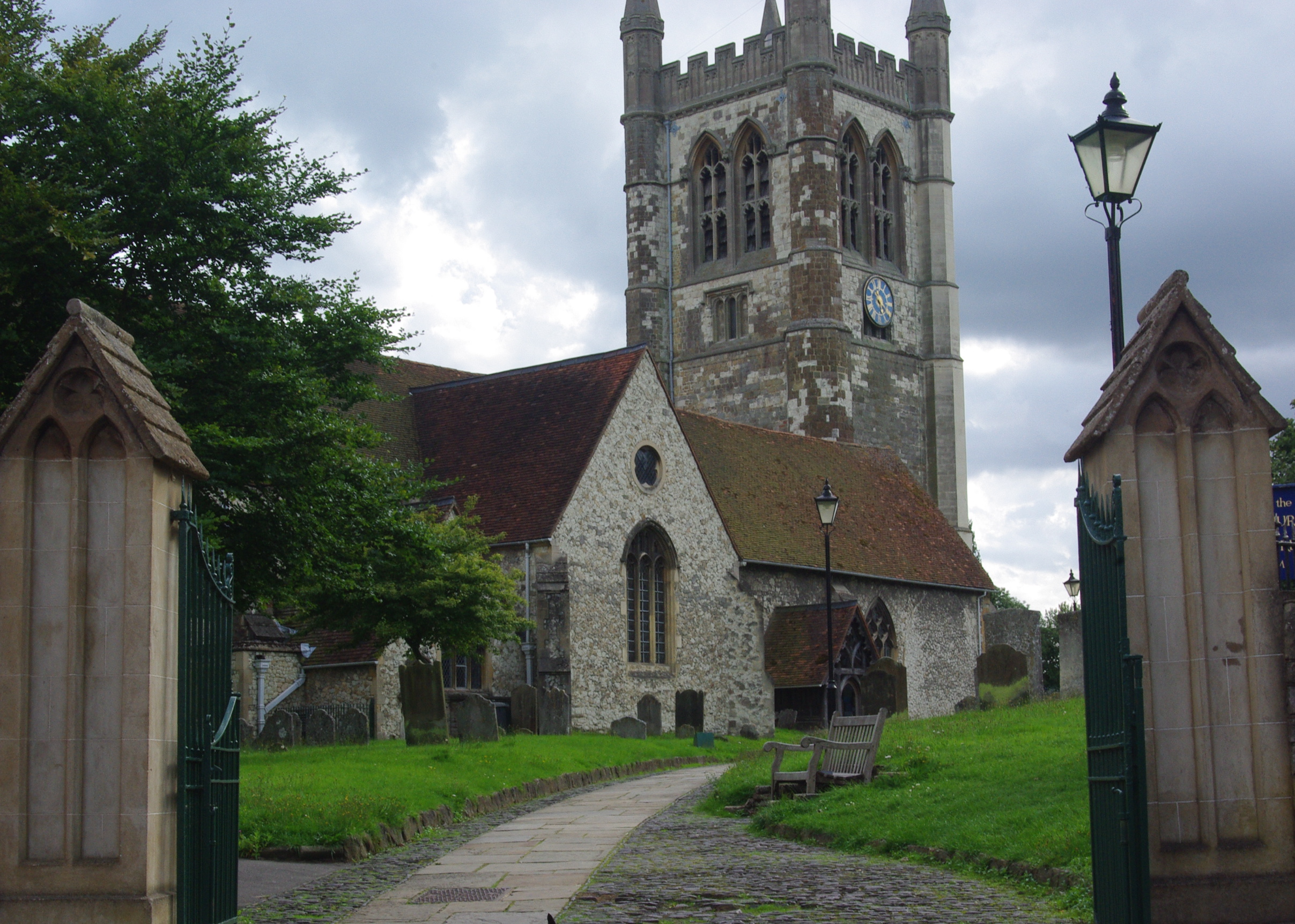
The entrance to the church; the grave of William Cobbett is opposite the doorway

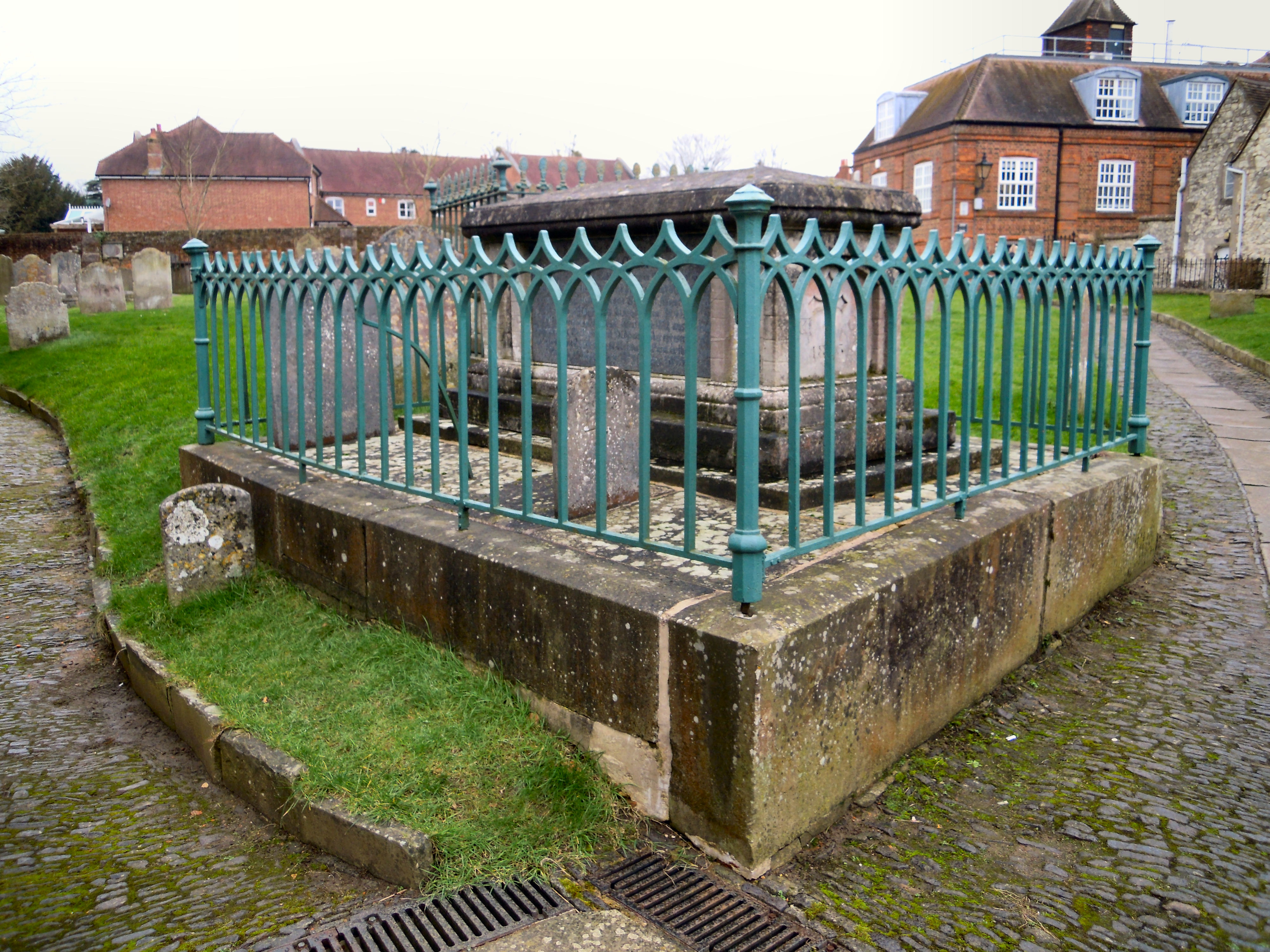
The tomb of William Cobbett

In 2005–06, a conservation and development project uncovered the foundations of a 7th-century Saxon church. No written record of this church survives. The oldest record is in the Domesday Book of 1086, which states that the Manor of Farnham was held by the Bishop of Winchester, and that the church was 'richly endowed'.

The oldest parts of the building date from the middle to the late 12th century, between 1150 and 1170. It was also around that time that the Archdeaconry of Surrey was created, and the new archdeacon used Farnham, and its castle, as a centre from which to visit the rest of Surrey.

In 1399, work on the chancel and the east end of the church was finished. The perpendicular window at the east end of the church remains unaltered since that time. On 22 June 1399, the bishop ordered the church to be consecrated.

On 16 February 1487, the parish obtained a licence from King Henry VII to get a curate for the church. In addition, a chantry chapel was built on the north side of the church, dedicated to the Virgin Mary. In the early 16th century, a new tower was built at the west end of the church; it was quite small, rising up no more than a couple of metres above the roof of the nave. Later, with Henry VIII's Abolition of Chantries Acts in 1545 and 1547, the chantry chapel was abolished, the objects it contained were sold off, and it was turned into a school room. In 1758, it was sold off and demolished to pay for church repairs.

The 19th century saw extensive restoration work done to the church. Most of it was done due to the efforts of John Utterton, who was the Archdeacon of Surrey and then went on to be the first Bishop suffragan of Guildford. In 1836, gas lighting was installed in the church and from 1855, a thorough restoration of the church was enacted: The nave and the aisles were re-seated, the galleries were removed and the transepts were enlarged to be able to hold gallery seating. In 1865, the tower was built upon, to a height of 115 feet (35 m), its present size.

James Conway Brown took up the position of organist of the church in 1879.

In the 20th century, more modifications were made to the church. In 1909, the south chapel was restored and renamed the Lady Chapel. 1956 saw a big restoration under the direction of the architect, David Nye. The altar was moved to a more central location within the church and the organ and choir stalls were moved from the transepts.

From 1990 to 2005, fundraising and planning efforts were made for a large-scale conservation project that would reinforce and repair the building's structure and foundations. £1.3 million was raised and Ptolemy Dean was given the role as architect for the development phase of the work. The tower and clock were restored, the buttresses were rebuilt and the Victorian pews were replaced with chairs.

== Features ==
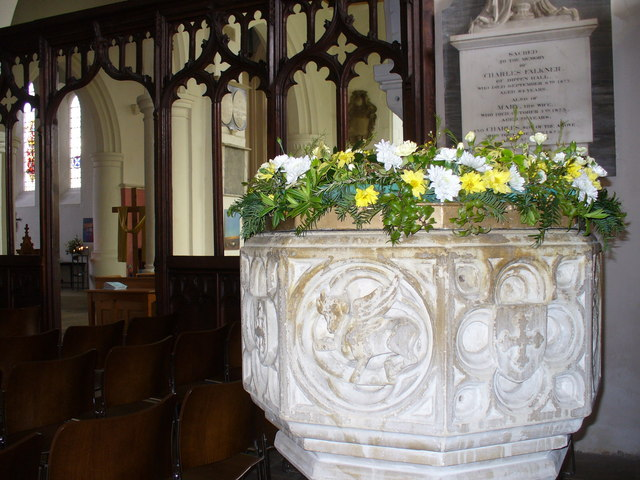
15th-century baptismal font

In the south transept of the church is a 15th-century baptismal font. It is carved with sacred monograms and symbols representing the four evangelists. It was moved in the renovations of 1959, from the doorway to the south transept. It was presented to the church in the 1830s by a family called Barlow, but it is unknown how it came to be in their possession.

The stonework of the east window has not changed since the Middle Ages, but the present glass was installed in the 19th century. It was designed by the notable architect, Augustus Pugin, and made by Hardman & Co. in 1851. It shows an example of Pugin designing in a style that he found problematic at times, showing elaborate group compositions under canopies and illustrating events from the life of Christ.

Outside the church entrance is the grave of the political reformer William Cobbett (1763–1835). He was born, baptised and grew up in Farnham. There is also a memorial to him on the church's tower wall.

On display at the back of the church is a copy of the Vinegar Bible; it was presented to the church in 1731 by Arthur Onslow. Also in the church is a plaque to Augustus Toplady, who wrote the hymn ‘Rock of Ages’. He was born in Farnham and baptised in the parish church in 1740.

== Parish ==
Next door to the church is St Andrew's Primary School. The church enjoys a close relationship with the school which is also a church controlled school; classes occasionally visit the church for acts of worship.

The church is open every day with morning and evening prayer on Mondays, Tuesdays and Thursdays. Sunday communion services are at 8am and 10am, with evening prayer at 6pm.

By having chairs in the church instead of pews, the church is able to host various concerts, plays, art exhibitions, school events, receptions and public meetings. Also the church has mission and outreach groups that promote Fairtrade products and the Make Poverty History campaign.

In 2022 the church was used as a location in the BBC One television mini-series Inside Man, with David Tennant as Reverend Harry Watling.

== Gallery ==
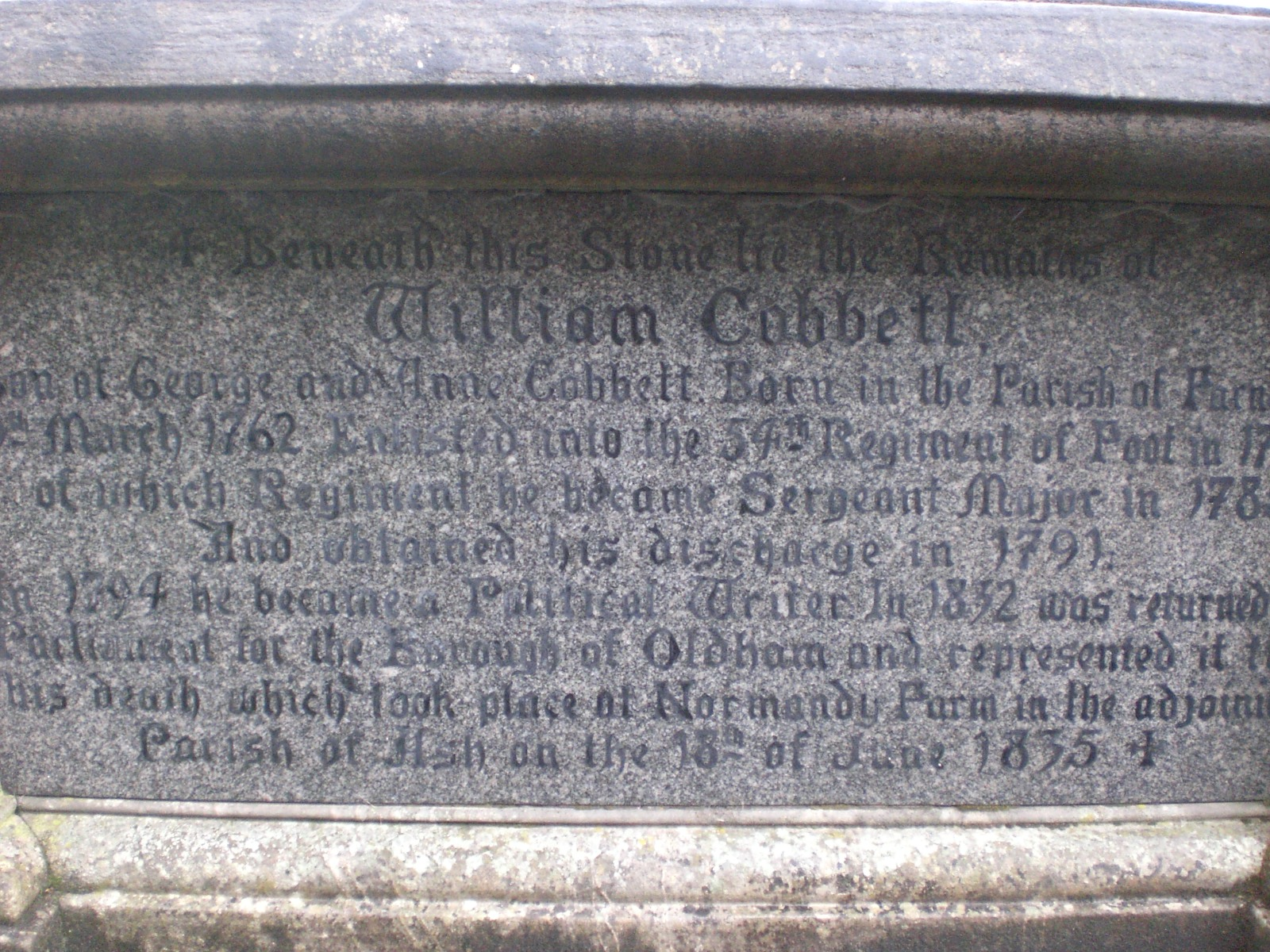
William Cobbett's grave

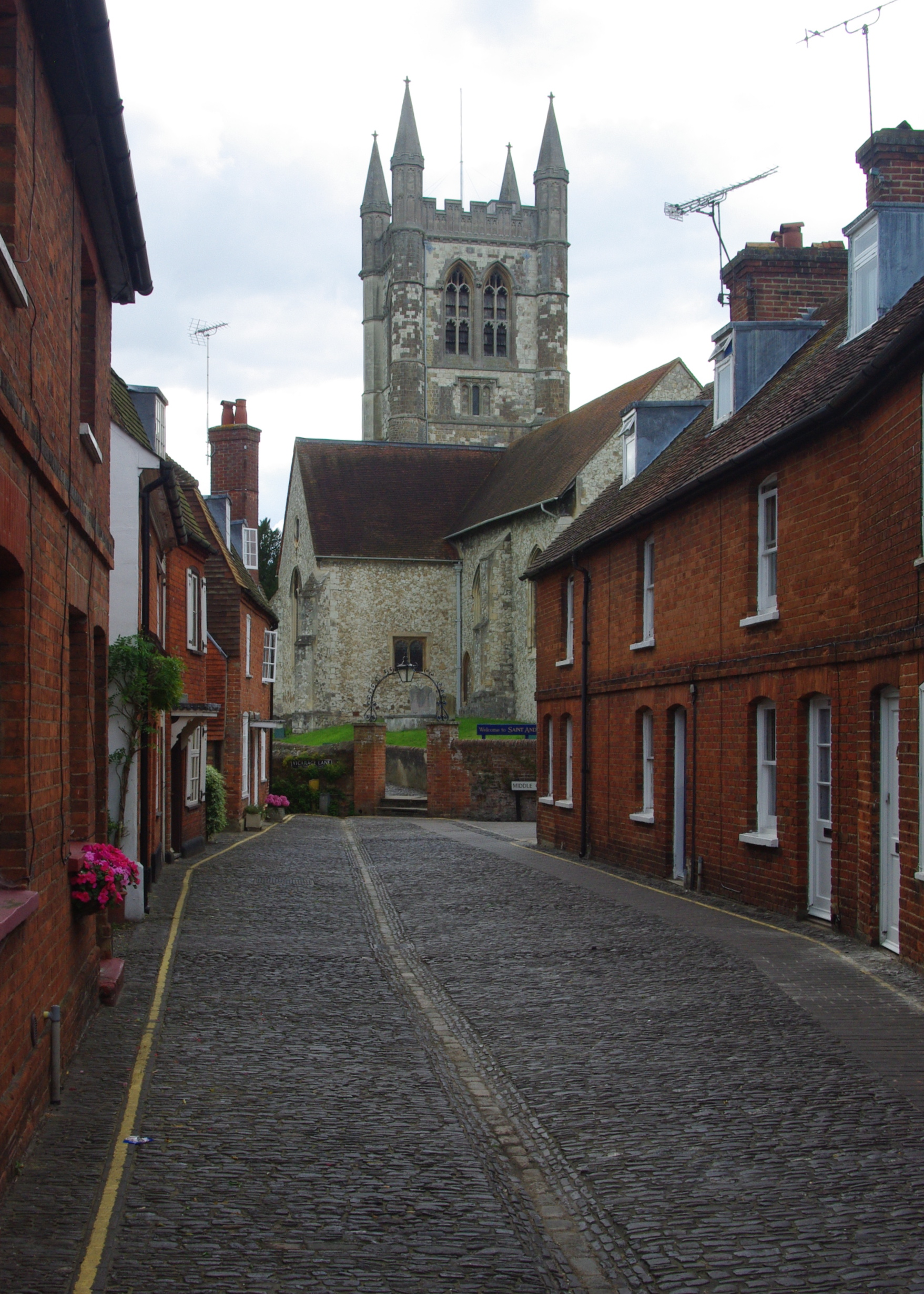
View down upper church lane

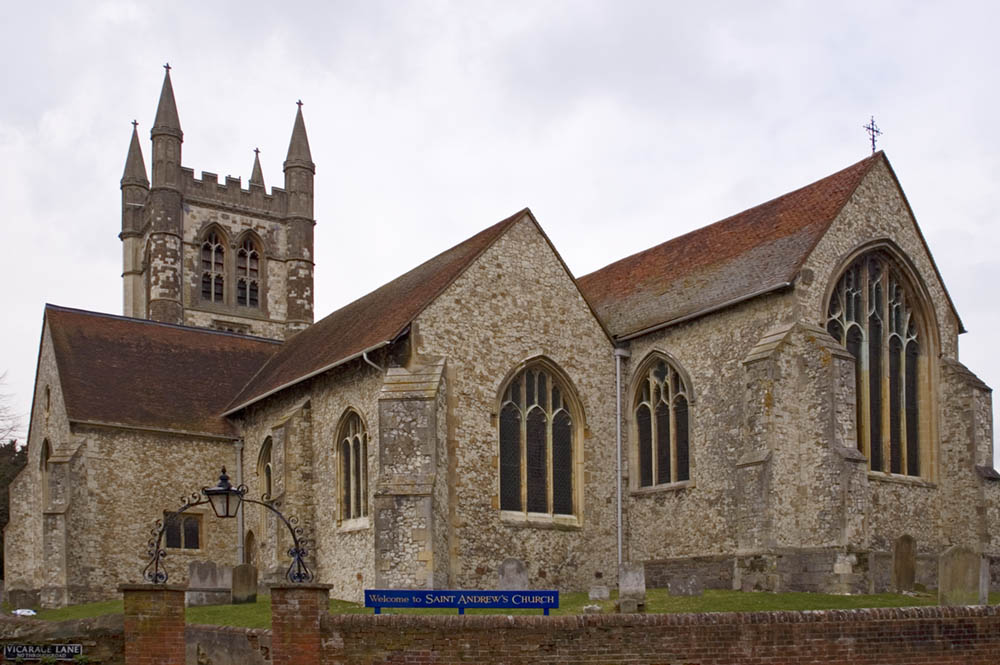
East side of the church

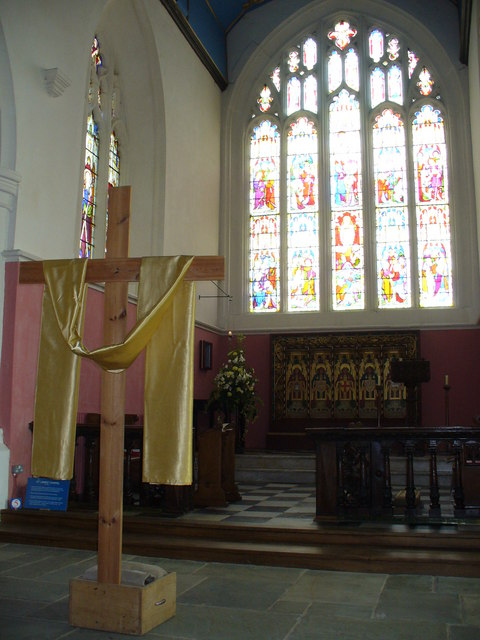
East window

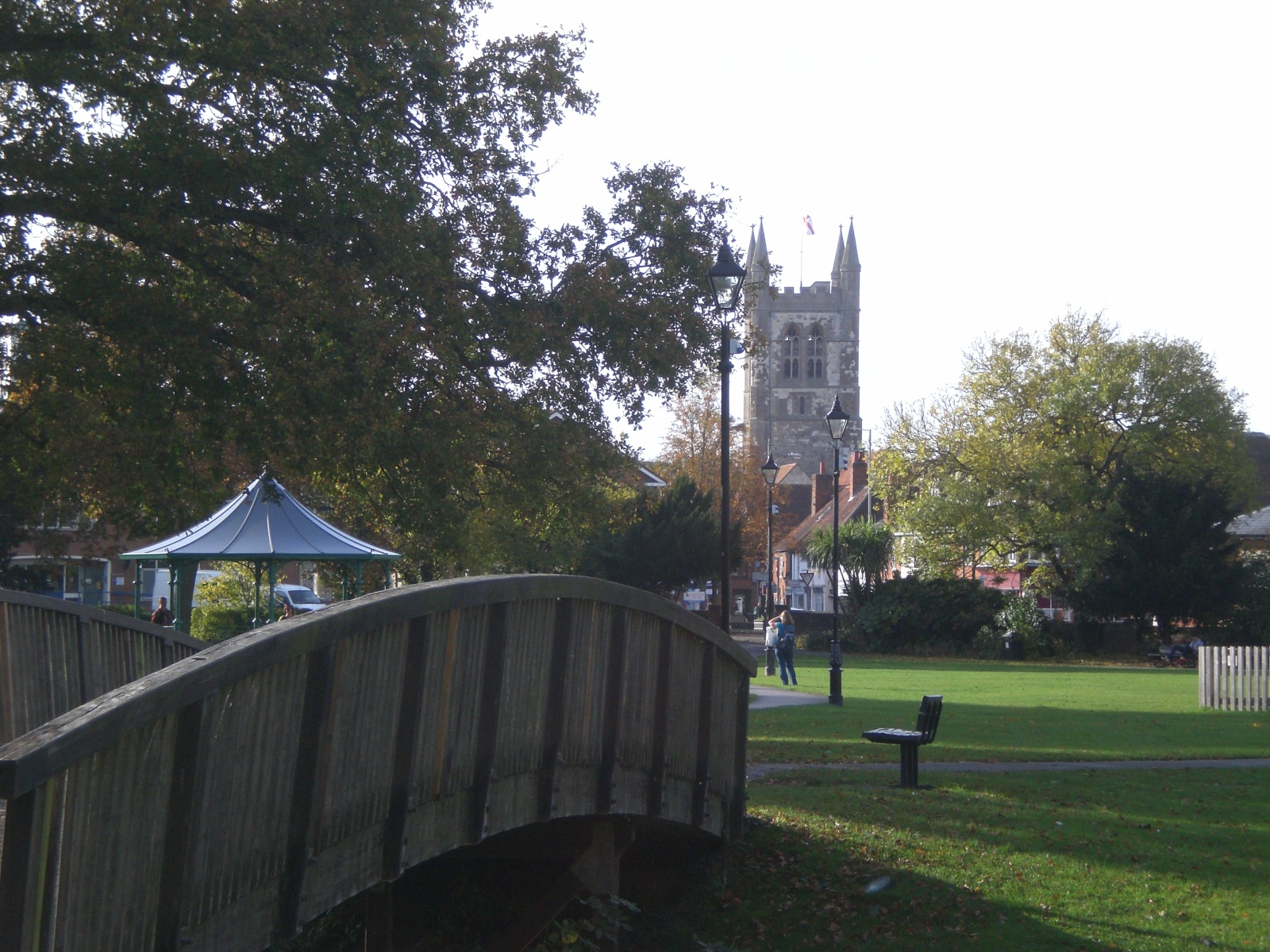
View of church from Gostrey Meadow, Farnham

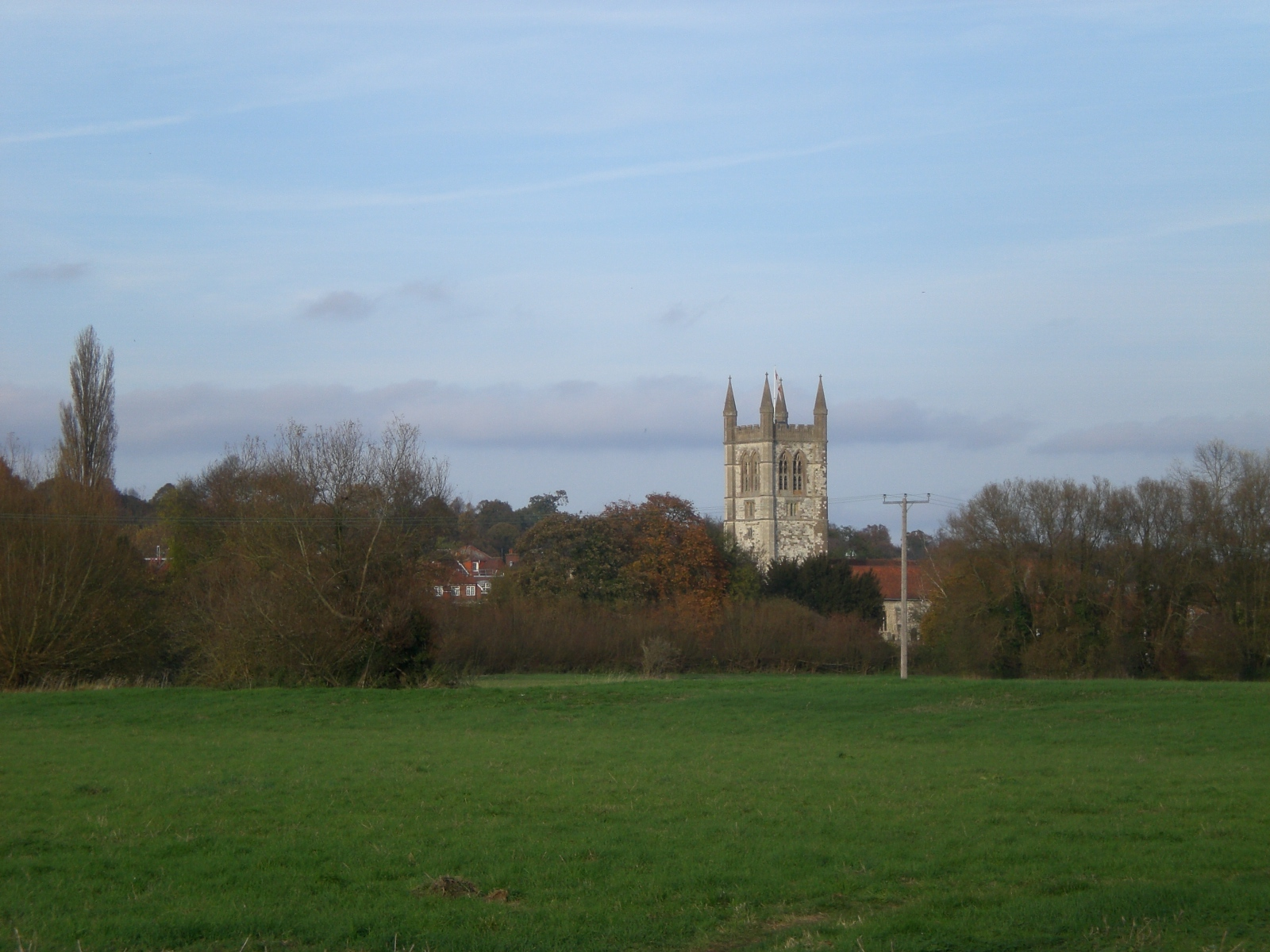
St Andrew's Church from the Bishop's Meadow, Farnham

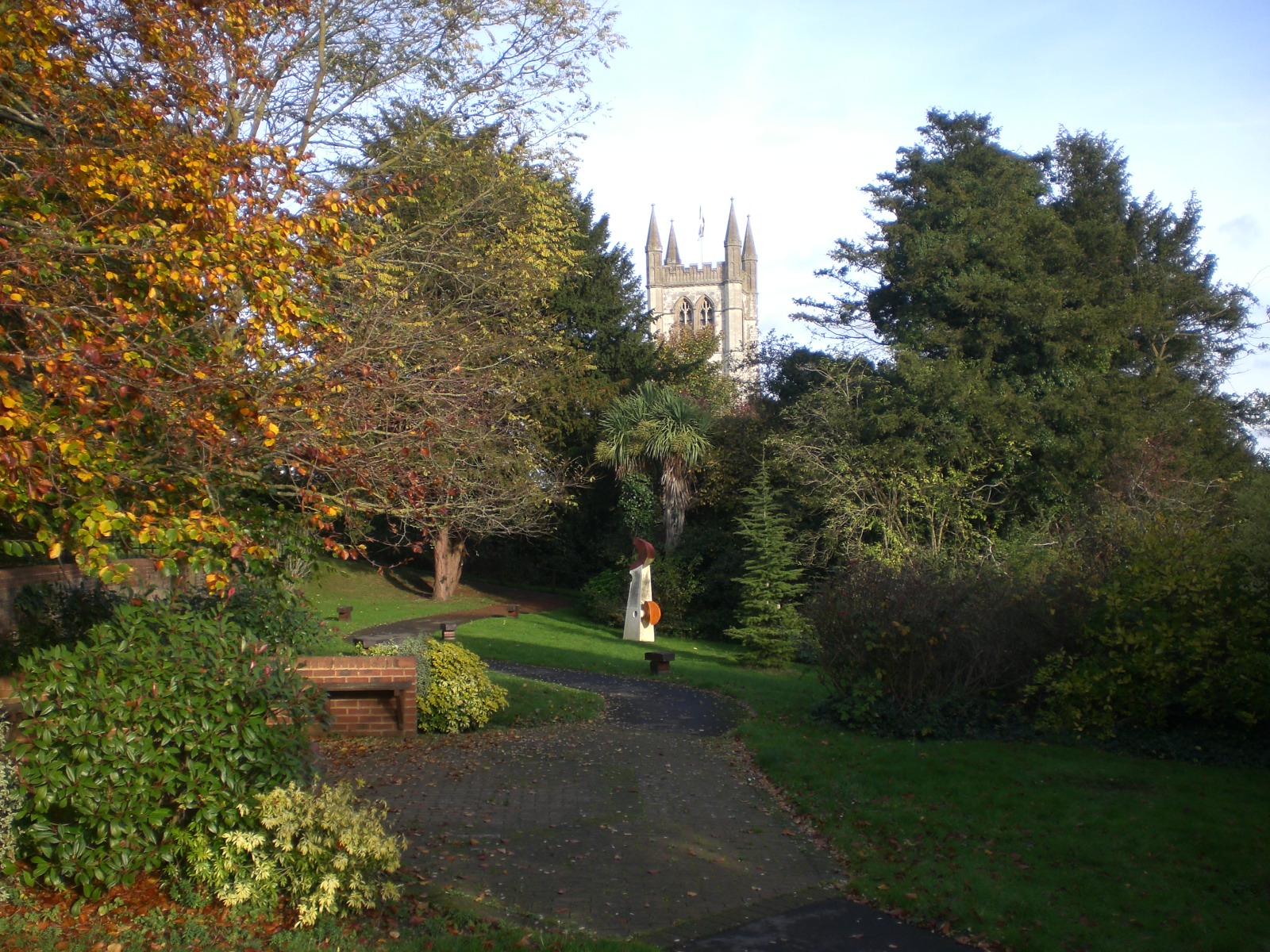
St Andrew's Church from Farnham Library Gardens

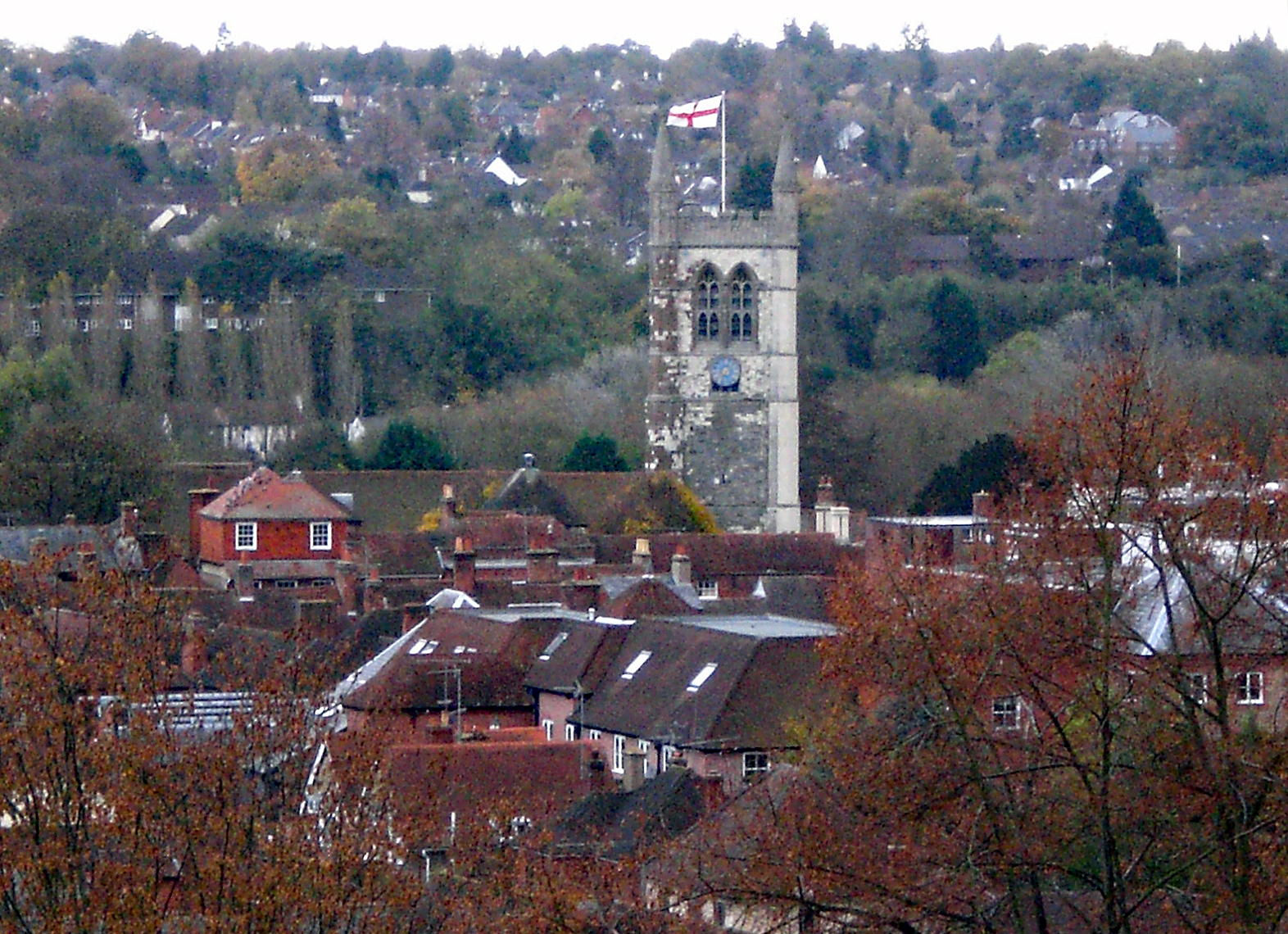
View of the church from Farnham Castle

== See also ==
- Farnham
- Farnham Castle
- St Peter's Church, Wrecclesham
