= Bernard Randolph =

Bernard Randolph may refer to:

- Bernard Randolph (merchant) (died c.1690), English merchant and writer
- Bernard P. Randolph (1933–2021), United States Air Force general
- Bernard Randolph (cricketer) (1834–1857), English cricketer
