= Leveson Randolph =

English cricketer and clergyman

Personal information
- Full name: Leveson Cyril Randolph
- Born: 28 May 1824; Much Hadham, Hertfordshire, England
- Died: 1 March 1876 (aged 51); Norwood, Surrey, England
- Batting: Unknown
- Relatives: Bernard Randolph (brother); Cyril Randolph (cousin)

Domestic team information
- Years: Team
- 1845: Oxford University

Career statistics
Competition	First-class
Matches	1
Runs scored	0
Batting average	0.00
100s/50s	–/–
Top score	0*
Catches/stumpings	1/–
- Source: Cricinfo, 18 June 2020

Leveson Cyril Randolph (28 May 1824 – 1 March 1876) was an English first-class cricketer and clergyman.

The son of The Reverend Thomas Randolph, he born in May 1824 at Much Hadham, Hertfordshire. He was educated at Westminster School, before going up to Christ Church, Oxford. While studying at Oxford, he made a single appearance in first-class cricket for Oxford University against Cambridge University in The University Match of 1845 at Lord's. Batting twice in the match, he ended the Oxford first innings of 66 unbeaten without scoring, while in their second innings of 96 he was dismissed for the same score by Stephen Rippingall. His cousin, Cyril Randolph, also played for Oxford in this match.

After graduating from Oxford, Randolph took holy orders in the Church of England. He was vicar of East Garston in Berkshire from 1853–70, before becoming vicar at St Luke's Church, West Norwood until his sudden death there in March 1876. He was married to Anne Boscawen from July 1854, with the couple having six children, including John Hugh Granville Randolph, who would later become Bishop of Guildford. His brother, Bernard Randolph, was also a first-class cricketer.
