= St Martin-in-the-Fields =

Church in London

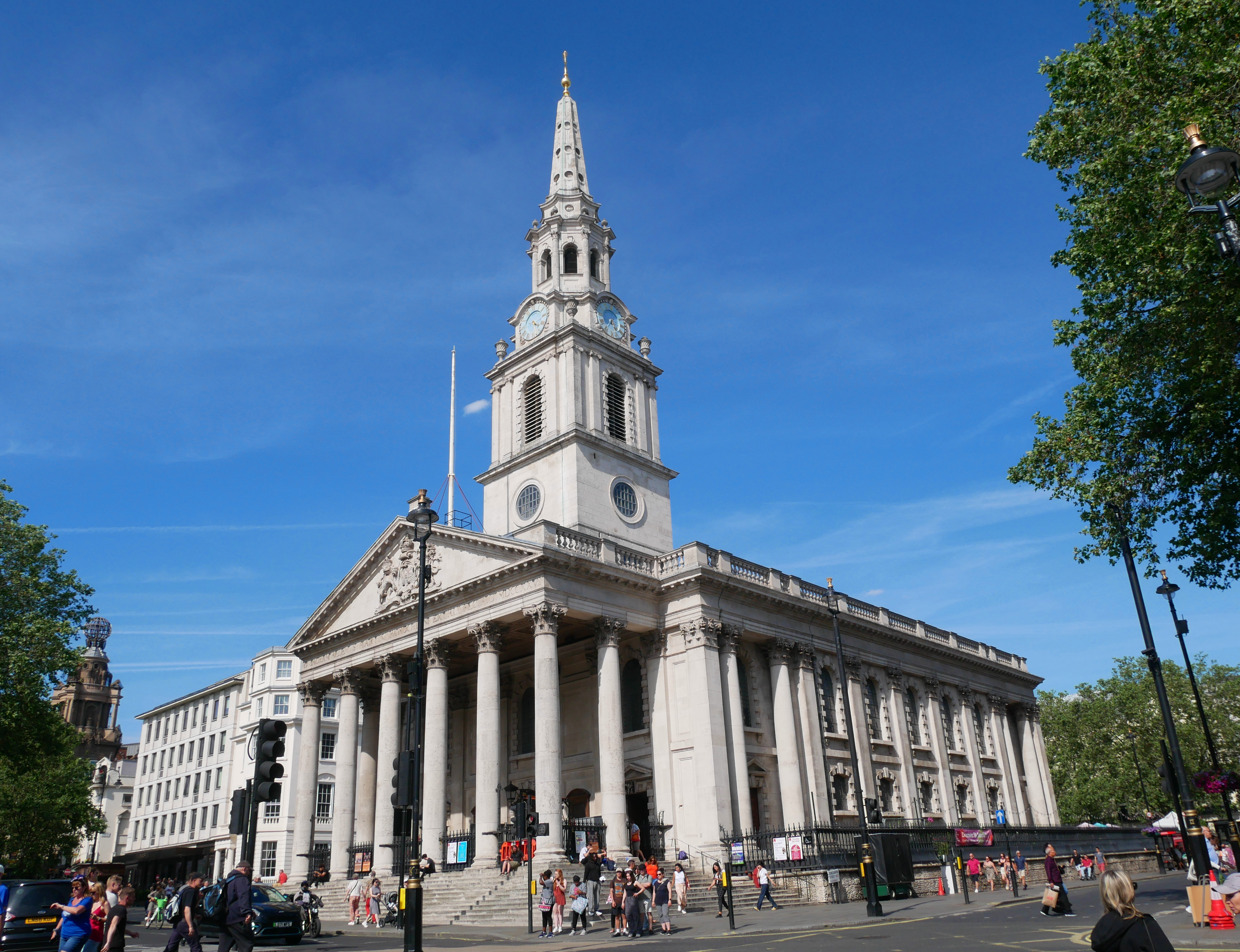
- The church in 2023

- Location within City of Westminster
- 51°30′32″N 0°07′37″W
- OS grid reference: TQ 30102 80541
- Location: Trafalgar Square, Westminster; London, WC2
- Country: England
- Denomination: Church of England
- Previous denomination: Roman Catholic
- Website: www.stmartin-in-the-fields.org

History
- Status: Parish church
- Dedication: Saint Martin

Architecture
- Functional status: Active
- Heritage designation: Grade I
- Architect: James Gibbs
- Architectural type: Church
- Style: Neoclassical
- Years built: 1721–1726

Administration
- Province: Canterbury
- Diocese: London
- Archdeaconry: London (previously Charing Cross)
- Deanery: Westminster (St Margaret)

Clergy
- Vicar: Sam Wells

Listed Building – Grade I
- Official name: Church of St Martin in the Fields
- Designated: 24 February 1958
- Reference no.: 1217661

St Martin-in-the-Fields is a Church of England parish church at the north-east corner of Trafalgar Square in the City of Westminster, London. Dedicated in honour of Saint Martin of Tours, there has been a church on the site since at least the medieval period. This location, at that time, was farmlands and fields beyond the London wall.

St Martin's became a principal parish church west of the old City in the early modern period as Westminster's population grew. When its medieval and Jacobean structure was found to be near failure, the present building was constructed in an influential neoclassical design by James Gibbs in 1722–1726. The church is one of the visual anchors adding to the open-urban space around Trafalgar Square.

== History ==
=== Roman era ===
Excavations at the site in 2006 uncovered a group of burials dating from c A.D. 350, including a sarcophagus burial dating from c. A.D. 410. The site is outside the city limits of Roman London (as was the usual Roman practice for burials) but is particularly interesting for being so far outside (1.6 km or 1 statute mile west-south-west of Ludgate), and this is leading to a reappraisal of Westminster's importance at that time. The burials are thought by some to mark a Christian centre of that time (possibly reusing the site or building of a pagan temple) or possibly even developing around the shrine of a martyr.

=== Saxon ===
The Roman burial ground was acknowledged by the Saxons, who also buried their dead there. To have such a long time span as a burial ground makes St Martin-in-the-Fields relatively unusual. It is possible that the Saxon town of Lundenwic essentially grew eastwards from the early burial group (Museum of London Archaeology).

=== Medieval and Tudor ===
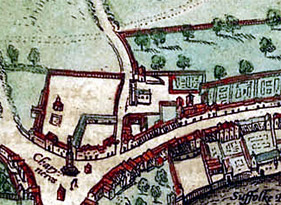
St Martin-in-the-Fields and Charing Cross, circa 1562

The earliest extant reference to the church is from 1222, when there was a dispute between the Abbot of Westminster and the Bishop of London as to who had control over it. The Archbishop of Canterbury decided in favour of Westminster, and the monks of Westminster Abbey began to use it.

Henry VIII rebuilt the church in 1542 to keep plague victims in the area from having to pass through his Palace of Whitehall. At this time it was literally "in the fields", occupying an isolated position between the cities of Westminster and London.

=== Seventeenth century ===
By the beginning of the reign of James I, the local population had increased greatly and the congregation had outgrown the building. In 1606 the king granted an acre (0.4 ha) of ground to the west of St Martin's Lane for a new churchyard, and the building was enlarged eastwards over the old burial ground, increasing the length of the church by about half. At the same time, the church was, in the phrase of the time, thoroughly "repaired and beautified". Later in the 17th century, capacity was increased by the addition of galleries. The creation of the new parishes of St Anne, Soho, and St James, Piccadilly, and the opening of a chapel in Oxenden Street also relieved some of the pressure on space.

As it stood at the beginning of the 18th century, the church was built of brick, rendered over, with stone facings. The roof was tiled, and there was a stone tower, with buttresses. The ceiling was slightly arched, supported with what Edward Hatton described as "Pillars of the Tuscan and Modern Gothick orders". The interior was wainscotted in oak to a height of 6 ft (1.8 m), while the galleries, on the north, south and west sides, were of painted deal. The church was about 84 ft (26 m) long and 62 ft (19 m) wide. The tower was about 90 ft (27 m) high.

A number of notables were buried in this phase of the church, including Robert Boyle, Nell Gwyn, John Parkinson and Sir John Birkenhead.

=== Rebuilding ===
Church of St. Martin-in-the Fields Act 1719
- Act of Parliament
- Parliament of Great Britain
- Long title: An Act for rebuilding the Parish Church of Saint Martin in the Fields, in the City of Westminster, at the Charge of the Inhabitants of the said Parish.
- Citation: 6 Geo. 1. c. 32 Pr.
- Territorial extent: Great Britain

Dates
- Royal assent: 11 June 1720
- Commencement: 23 November 1719 (Note: Start of session.)
- Repealed
Other legislation
Repealed by	London Government (City of Westminster) Order in Council 1901
Relates to	St. Martin-in-the Fields Church Rebuilding Act 1723

Status: Repealed

St. Martin-in-the Fields Church Rebuilding Act 1723
- Act of Parliament
- Parliament of Great Britain
- Long title: An Act for compleating the re-building the Parish Church of St. Martin in the Fields.
- Citation: 10 Geo. 1. c. 4 Pr.
- Territorial extent: Great Britain

Dates
- Royal assent: 19 March 1724
- Commencement: 9 January 1724
- Repealed
Other legislation
Relates to	Church of St. Martin-in-the Fields Act 1719; St. Botolphs Bishopsgate Church Rebuilding Act 1723

Status: Current legislation

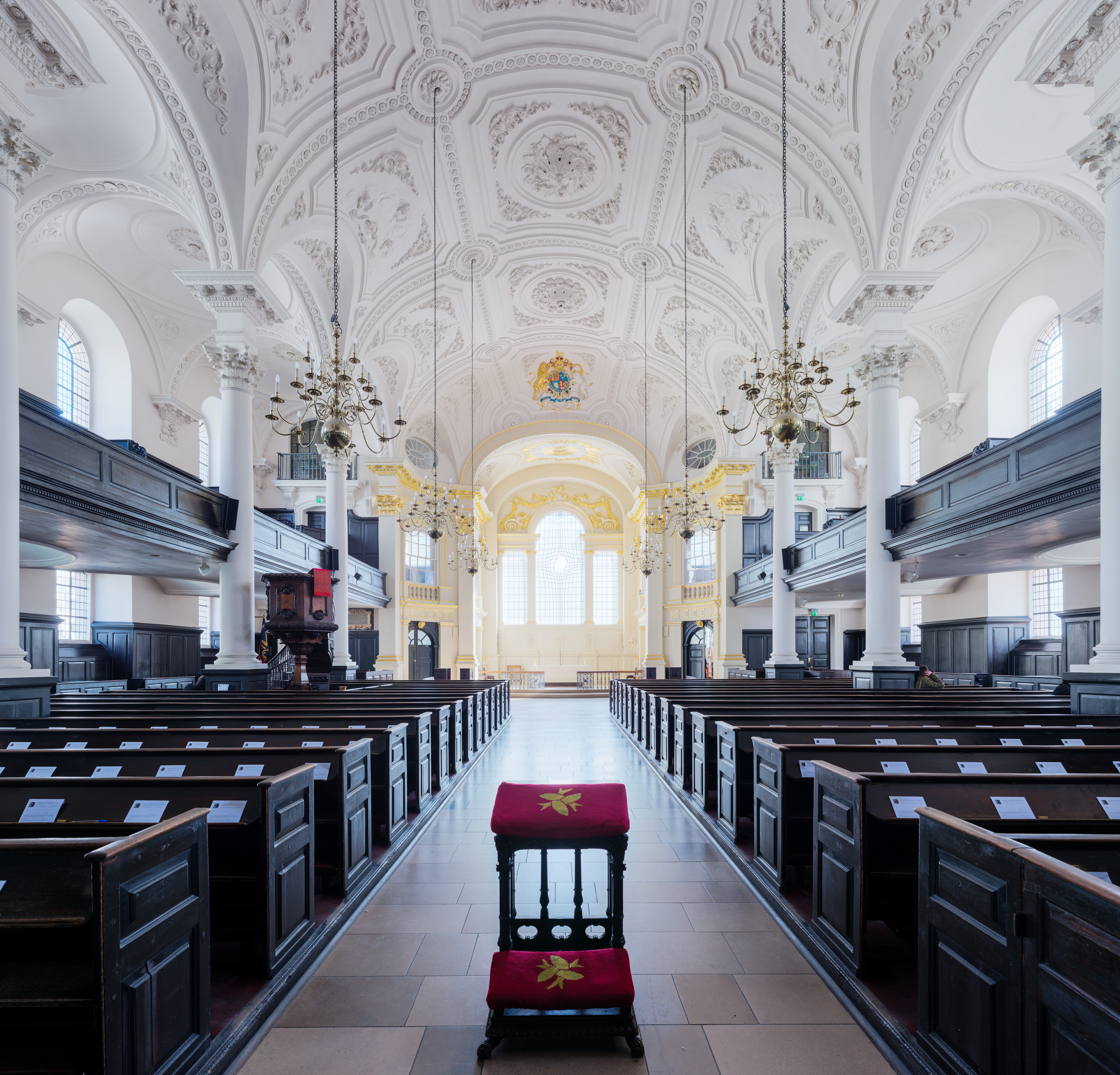
Interior of St Martin-in-the-Fields

A survey of 1710 found that the walls and roof were in a state of decay. In 1720, Parliament passed an act of Parliament, the Church of St. Martin-in-the Fields Act 1719 (6 Geo. 1. c. 32 Pr.) for the rebuilding of the church allowing for a sum of up to £22,000, to be raised by a rate on the parishioners. A temporary church was erected partly on the churchyard and partly on ground in Lancaster Court. Advertisements were placed in the newspapers that bodies and monuments of those buried in the church or churchyard could be taken away for reinterment by relatives.

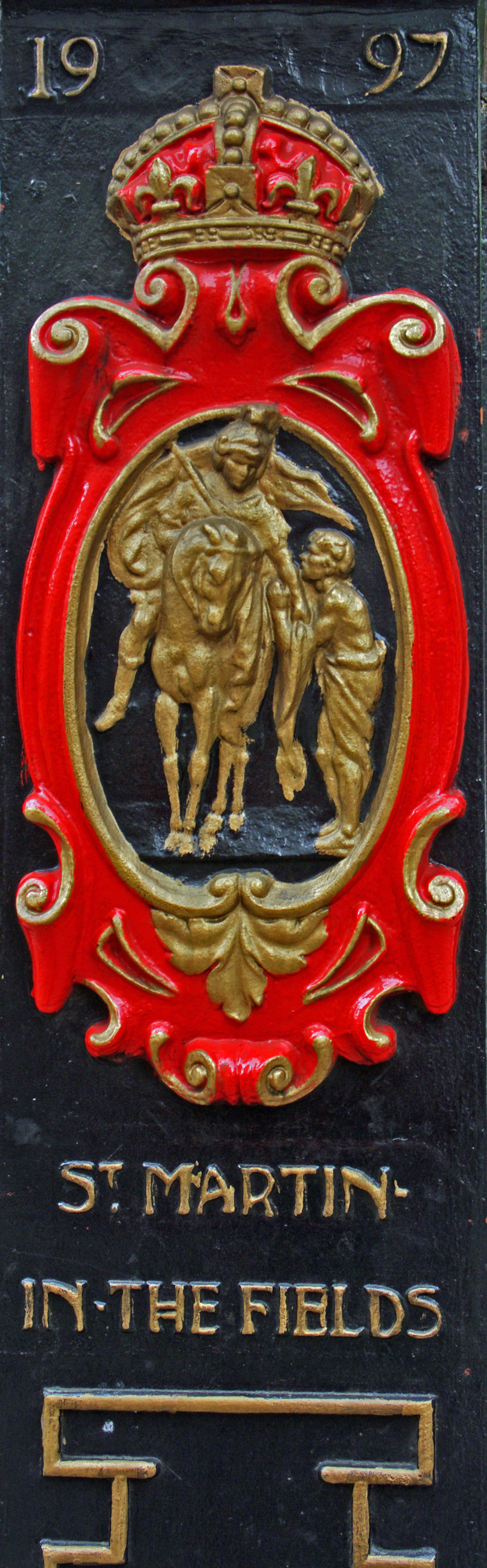
Lamp post detail

The rebuilding commissioners selected James Gibbs to design the new church. His first suggestion was for a church with a circular nave and domed ceiling, but the commissioners considered this scheme too expensive. Gibbs then produced a simpler, rectilinear plan, which they accepted. The foundation stone was laid on 19 March 1722, and the last stone of the spire was placed into position in December 1724. The total cost was £33,661 including the architect's fees.

The west front of St Martin's has a portico with a pediment supported by a giant order of Corinthian columns, six wide. The order is continued around the church by pilasters. In designing the church, Gibbs drew upon the works of Christopher Wren, but departed from Wren's practice in his integration of the tower into the church. Rather than considering it as an adjunct to the main body of the building, he constructed it within the west wall, so that it rises above the roof, immediately behind the portico, an arrangement also used at around the same time by John James at St George, Hanover Square (completed in 1724), although James' steeple is much less ambitious. The spire of St Martin's rises 192 ft (59 m) above the level of the church floor.

The church is rectangular in plan, with the five-bay nave divided from the aisles by arcades of Corinthian columns. There are galleries over both aisles and at the west end. The nave ceiling is a flattened barrel vault, divided into panels by ribs. The panels are decorated in stucco with cherubs, clouds, shells and scroll work, executed by Giuseppe Artari and Giovanni Bagutti.

Until the creation of Trafalgar Square in the 1820s, Gibbs's church was crowded by other buildings. J. P. Malcolm, writing in 1807, said that its west front "would have a grand effect if the execrable watch-house and sheds before it were removed" and described the sides of the church as "lost in courts, where houses approach them almost to contact".

The design was criticised widely at the time, but subsequently became extremely famous, being copied particularly widely in the United States. Although Gibbs was discreetly Catholic, his four-wall, long rectangular floor plan, with a triangular gable roof and a tall prominent centre-front steeple (and often, columned front-portico), became closely associated with Protestant church architecture world-wide.

In Britain, the design of St Andrew's in the Square church (built 1739–56) in Glasgow was inspired by the church. In the American Colonies, St. Michael's Anglican Church (Charleston, South Carolina) (built 1751–61), was heavily influenced by St Martin-in-the-fields, though the columns of its front portico are of the Tuscan order, rather than the Corinthian order. All Souls Church, Unitarian (Washington, D.C.) is also based on it, but without the royal insignia. St. George's Church, Dublin (built 1802), though obviously influence by St Martin's-in-the-fields, that influence seems to be via St Andrews in the Square, as exampled in the copying of its Ionic columns instead of St Martin's Corinthian columns. In India, St Andrew's Church, Egmore (built 1818–1821), Madras (now Chennai), is another example. In South Africa, the Dutch Reformed Church in Cradock is modelled on St Martin-in-the-Fields.

Various notables were soon buried in the new church, including the émigré sculptor Louis-François Roubiliac (who had settled in this area of London) and the furniture-maker Thomas Chippendale (whose workshop was in the same street as the church, St Martin's Lane), along with Jack Sheppard in the adjoining churchyard. This churchyard, which lay to the south of the church, was removed to make way for Duncannon Street, constructed in the 19th century to provide access to the newly created Trafalgar Square. Two small parcels of the churchyard survived, to the north and east of the church. The Metropolitan Public Gardens Association laid them out for public use in 1887; unusually for the MPGA, it paved them with flagstones as well as planted them with trees. For many years covered in market stalls, the churchyard has been restored including with the provision of seating.

St Martin's is a Grade I listed building. Its walls and railings, also designed by Gibbs, have a separate Grade I listing.

=== Recent times ===
Audio description of the church by Michael Elwyn

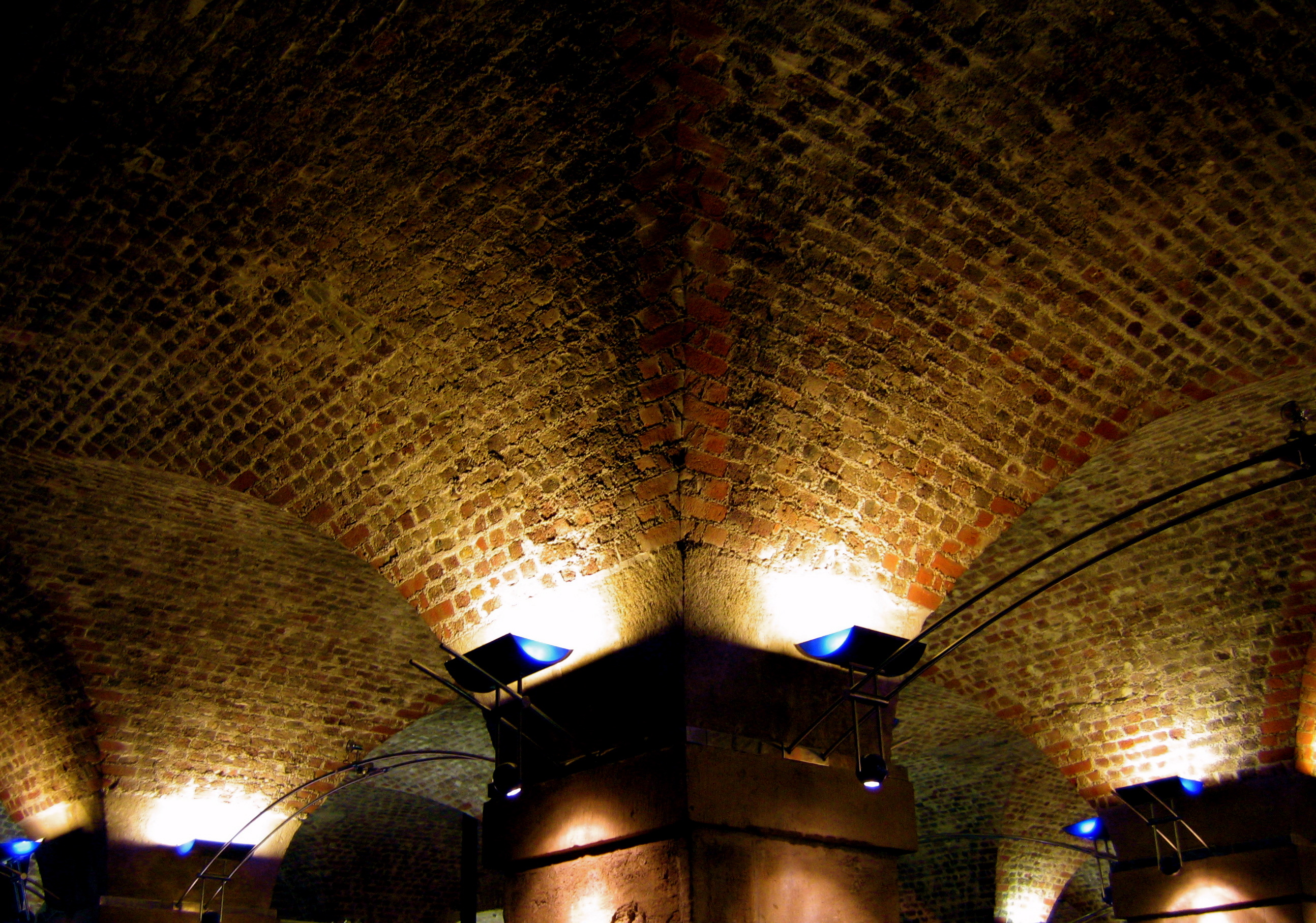
The ceiling of the café in the crypt

Because of its prominent position, St Martin-in-the-Fields is one of the most famous churches in London. Dick Sheppard, Vicar from 1914 to 1927 who began programmes for the area's homeless, coined its ethos as the "Church of the Ever Open Door". The church is famous for its work with young and homeless people through The Connection at St Martin-in-the-Fields, created in 2003 through the merger of two programmes dating at least to 1948. The Connection shares with The Vicar's Relief Fund the money raised each year by the BBC Radio 4 Appeal's Christmas appeal.

The crypt houses a café which hosts jazz concerts whose profits support the programmes of the church. The crypt is also home to the London Brass Rubbing Centre, established in 1975 as an art gallery, book, and gift shop. A life-sized marble statue of Henry Croft, London's first pearly king, was moved to the crypt in 2002 from its original site at St Pancras Cemetery.

In January 2006, work began on a £36-million renewal project. The project included renewing the church itself, as well as provision of facilities encompassing the church's crypt, a row of buildings to the north and some significant new underground spaces in between. The funding included a grant of £15.35 million from the Heritage Lottery Fund. The church and crypt reopened in the summer of 2008.

Since 2012 its vicar is Sam Wells.

Twelve historic bells from St Martin-in-the-Fields, cast in 1725, are included in the peal of the Swan Bells tower in Perth, Australia. The current set of twelve bells, cast in 1988, which replaced the old ones are rung every Sunday between 9 am and 10 am by the St Martin in the Fields Band of Bell Ringers. The bells are also rung by the Friends of Dorothy Society each year as part of London Pride.

== In popular culture ==
Being in a prominent central London location, the exterior of the church building frequently appears in films, including Notting Hill and Enigma, and television programmes, including Doctor Who and Sherlock.

References to the church take place in the following novels:

- 1850: David Copperfield by Charles Dickens
- 1908: A Room with a View by E. M. Forster
- 1928: The Last Post, the fourth and final novel in Ford Madox Ford's tetralogy Parade's End
- 1949: Nineteen Eighty-Four by George Orwell (in which a future Totalitarian regime abolishes religion and turns the building into a military museum)
- 1949: The Parasites by Daphne du Maurier
- 2004: Quicksilver by Neal Stephenson
- 2012: Winter of the World by Ken Follett

References to the church occur in the following poems:

- 1893: "The Kingdom of God" by Francis Thompson
- 2009: "Now traveller, whose journey passes through" by Andrew Motion

The St Mary's Church in Pune is designed in the style of St Martin's.

The church may be the St Martin's referred to in the nursery rhyme known as Oranges and Lemons.

== Royal connections ==
The church has a close relationship with the royal family, whose parish church it is, as well as with 10 Downing Street and the Admiralty.

== Almshouses ==
The church established its own almhouses and pension-charity on 21 September 1886. The 19 church trustees administered almshouses for women and provided them with a weekly stipend. The almshouses were built in 1818, in Bayham Street (to a design by Henry Hake Seward), on part of the parish burial ground in Camden Town and St Pancras and replaced those constructed in 1683.

== Charity ==
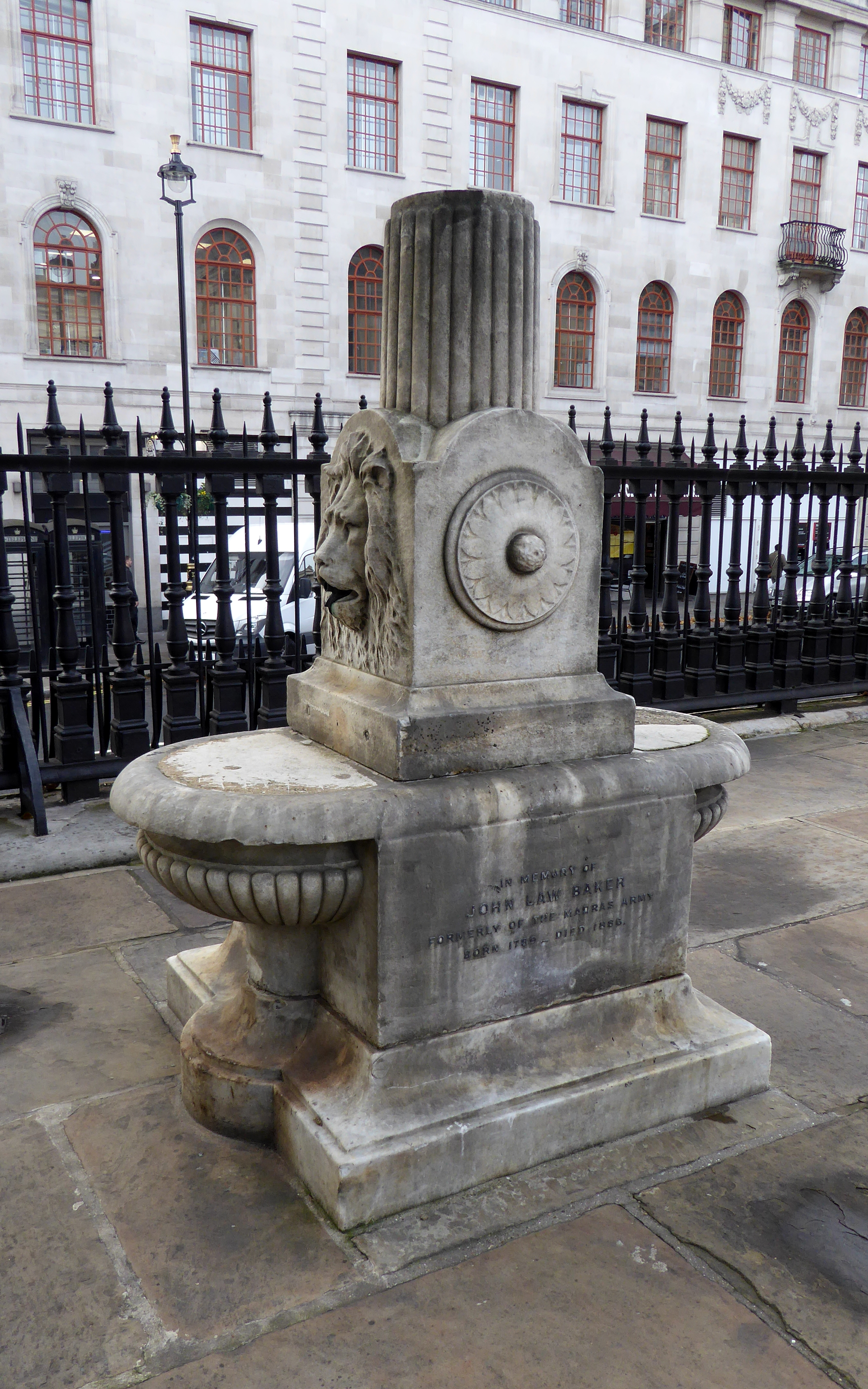
The John Law Baker drinking fountain stands in the churchyard

The St Martin-in-the-Fields charity supports homeless and vulnerably housed people. The church has raised money for vulnerable people in its annual Christmas Appeal since 1920 and in an annual BBC radio broadcast since December 1927.

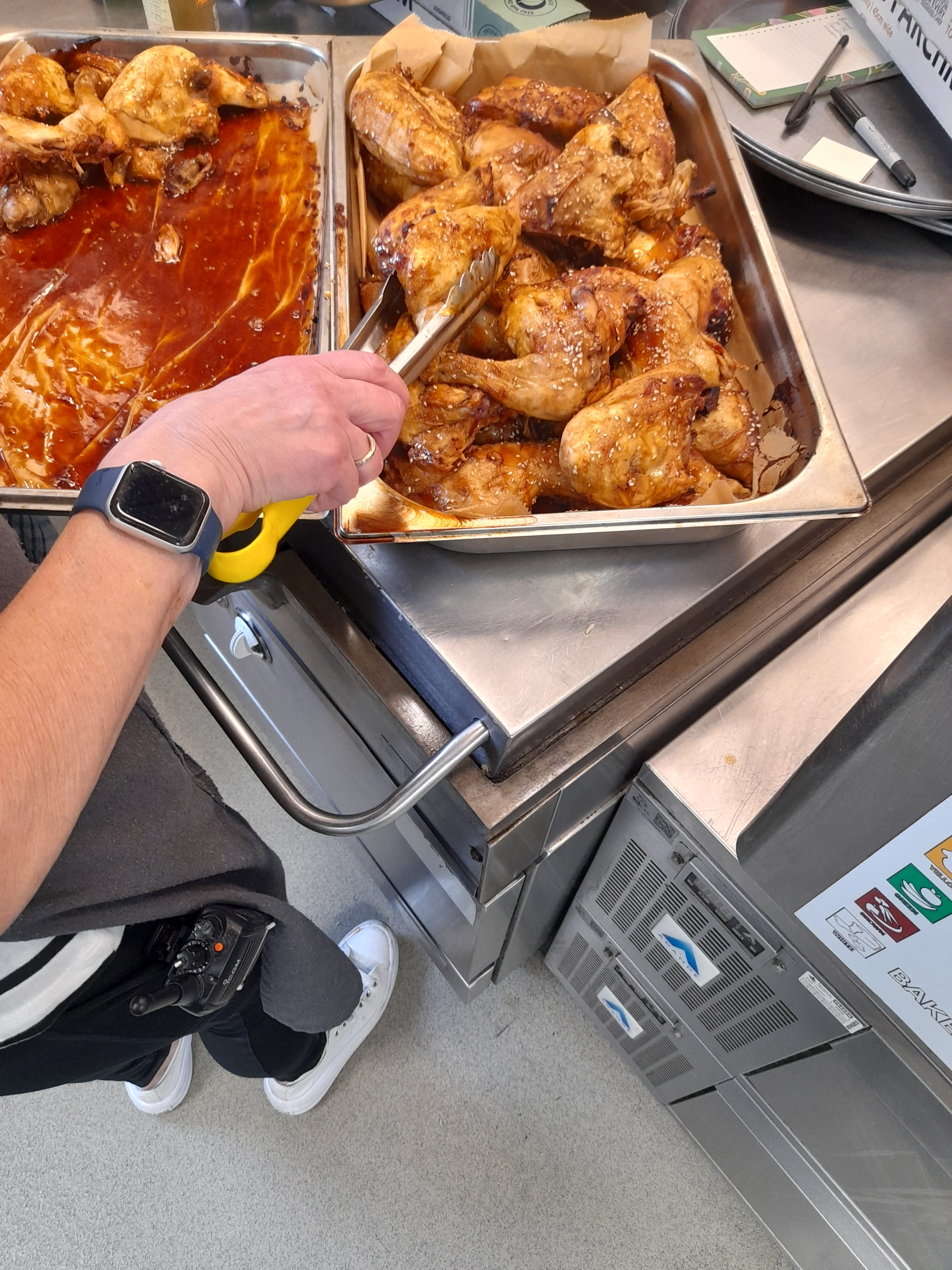
Connections providing guests tasty nourishing meals. Donated chicken prepared with Teriyaki sauce.

The Connection at St Martin's is located next to the church, and works closely with the church's charity. It supports 4000 homeless people in London each year, by providing accommodation, medical and dental care, skills training, and creative activities as well as offering shower facilities and hot fresh cooked meals for registered guests.

== Vicars ==
- 1539: Edmund Watson
- 1539: Robert Beste
- 1554: Thomas Wells
- 1572: Robert Beste
- 1572: William Wells
- 1574: Thomas Langhorne
- 1574: William Ireland
- 1577: Christopher Hayward
- 1588: William Fisher
- 1591: Thomas Knight
- 1602: Thomas Mountford
- 1605–1611: Francis Marbury
- 1632: William Bray
- 1641: John Wincopp
- 1643: Thomas Strickland
- 1644–1648: Daniel Cawdry
- 1648: Gabriel Sangar
- 1661: Nicholas Hardy
- 1670: Thomas Lamplugh
- 1676: William Lloyd
- 1680: Thomas Tenison
- 1692: William Lancaster
- 1693: Nicholas Gouge
- 1694–1716: William Lancaster
- 1716–1723: Thomas Green
- 1723–1756: Zachariah Pearce
- 1756–1775: Erasmus Saunders
- 1776–1812: Anthony Hamilton
- 1812–1824: Joseph Holden Pott
- 1824–1834: George Richards
- 1834–1848: Sir Henry Robert Dukinfield, Bart.
- 1848–1855: Henry Mackenzie
- 1855–1886: William Gilson Humphry
- 1886–1903: John Fenwick Kitto
- 1903–1914: Leonard Edmund Shelford
- 1914–1927: Hugh Richard Laurie Sheppard
- 1927–1940: William Patrick Glyn McCormick
- 1941–1947: Eric Loveday
- 1948–1956: Lewis Mervyn Charles-Edwards
- 1956–1984: Austen Williams
- 1985–1995: Geoffrey Brown
- 1995–2011: Nicholas Holtam
- 2012–present: Samuel Wells

== Music ==
The church is known for its regular lunchtime and evening concerts: many ensembles perform there, including the Academy of St Martin in the Fields, which was co-founded by Sir Neville Marriner and John Churchill, a former Master of Music at St Martin's.

=== Organ ===
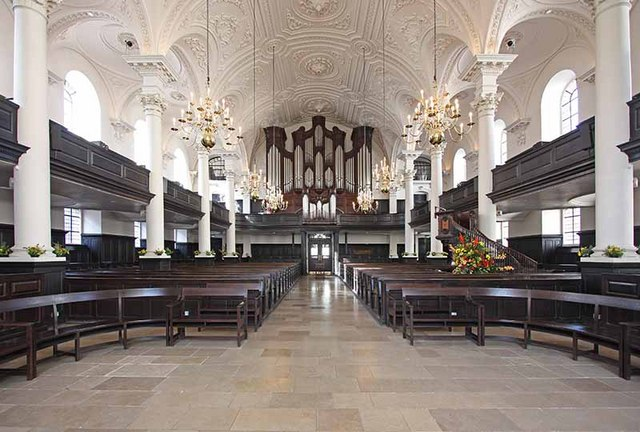
West end and organ by J. W. Walker

The organ is housed in the west gallery. The first organ to be installed in the new Gibbs church of 1726 was built by Christopher Schreider (now in St Mary the Virgin, Wotton-under-Edge, Gloucestershire). The current instrument was built in 1990 by J.W. Walker & Sons.

==== List of organists ====
Organists include:

- John Weldon 1714–1736
- Joseph Kelway 1736–1781 (formerly organist of St Michael, Cornhill)
- Benjamin Cooke 1781–1793
- Robert Cooke 1793–1814 (son of Benjamin Cooke)
- Thomas Forbes Gerrard Walmisley 1814–1854
- William Thomas Best 1852–1855?
- W. H. Adams, appointed 1857
- H. W. A. Beale
- William John Kipps 1899–1924
- Martin Shaw 1920–1924
- Arnold Goldsborough 1924–1935
- John Alden 1935–1938
- Stanley Drummond Wolff 1938–1946
- John Churchill 1949–1967
- Eric Harrison 1967–1968
- Robert Vincent 1968–1977 (later organist of Manchester Cathedral)
- Christopher Stokes 1977–1989 (later Director of Music, St Margaret's Westminster Abbey and Organist & Master of the Choristers Manchester Cathedral)
- Mark Stringer 1989–1996 (Assistant Organist 1985-1989), sometime Director of Music, Methodist Central Hall, Westminster); Director of Music, Wells cathedral School, 2015-2021
- Paul Stubbings 1996–2001 (later Director of Music, St Mary's Music School, Edinburgh)
- Nick Danks 2001–2008
- Andrew Earis 2009–

== St Martin's school ==
In 1699 the church founded a school for poor and less fortunate boys, which later became a girls' school. It was originally sited in Charing Cross Road, near the church. At one time it was known as St Martin's Middle Class School for Girls, and was later renamed St Martin-in-the-Fields High School for Girls. It was relocated to a site in Lambeth in 1928.

The school badge depicted the eponymous Saint Martin of Tours. The school's Latin motto Caritate et disciplina translated as "With love and learning".

== See also ==
- Academy of St Martin in the Fields
- Christ Child – sculpture (1999)
- Peter G. Dyson
- List of churches in London
- St. George's Church, Dublin, considered one of the finest stylistic "daughter" churches to St Martin-in-the-Fields
