= Ian Brackley =

British Anglican bishop (born 1947)

- Bishop of Dorking
- Diocese: Diocese of Guildford
- In office: 1996–30 September 2015 (retired)
- Predecessor: David Wilcox
- Successor: Jo Bailey Wells
- Other post: acting Bishop of Portsmouth (2009–2010)

Orders
- Ordination: 1971 (deacon); 1972 (priest)
- Consecration: 1996

Personal details
- Born: 13 December 1947 (age 78)
- Denomination: Anglican
- Spouse: Penny
- Children: 2
- Education: Keble College, Oxford

Ian James Brackley (born 13 December 1947) is a retired British Anglican bishop. He was the Bishop of Dorking from 1996 to 2015.

Brackley was educated at Westcliff High School for Boys. and Keble College, Oxford, He was ordained as a deacon on 19 September 1971 (Michaelmas). and on 24 September 1972 – both times by Oliver Tomkins, Bishop of Bristol, at Bristol Cathedral. He began his ordained ministry as a curate at St Mary Magdalene, Lockleaze. From 1977 until 1980 he was chaplain at Bryanston School then vicar of East Preston, St Wilfrid's Church, Haywards Heath (1988–1996) and finally Rural Dean of Cuckfield before his appointment to the episcopate. He was consecrated a bishop at Westminster Abbey on 25 January 1996. A keen golfer,

Brackley is married with two children. He retired from the See of Dorking on 30 September 2015.

During the 2009–2010 episcopal vacancy in the Diocese of Portsmouth, Brackley served as the commissary bishop (essentially "acting diocesan bishop"), since that diocese has no suffragan bishop to perform that role as would be more usual.

On 11 February 2017, 14 retired bishops signed an open letter to the then-serving bishops of the Church of England. In an unprecedented move, they expressed their opposition to the House of Bishops' report to General Synod on sexuality, which recommended no change to the church's canons or practises around sexuality. By 13 February, a serving bishop (Alan Wilson, Bishop of Buckingham) and nine further retired bishops – including Brackley – had added their signatures; on 15 February, the report was rejected by synod. Brackley now lives in the Petersfield area and was licensed an honorary assistant bishop of the Diocese of Portsmouth in 2016.

Brackley is a keen golfer.

== Styles ==
- The Reverend Ian Brackley (1971–1996)
- The Right Reverend Ian Brackley (1996–present)

Church of England titles
Preceded by David Wilcox	Bishop of Dorking; 1996–2015	Succeeded by Jo Bailey Wells
