= Henry Croft (pearly) =

Founder of Pearly Kings and Queens (1861–1930)

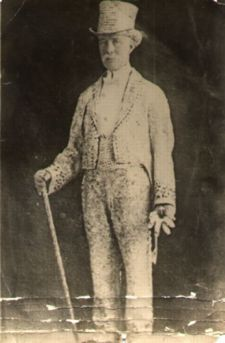
- Henry Croft as Pearly King
- Born: 24 May 1861; St Pancras Workhouse, Somers Town, London
- Died: 1 January 1930 (aged 68); St Pancras workhouse
- Occupation: Road sweeper
- Known for: Founder of the Pearly Kings and Queens

Henry Croft (24 May 1861 — 1 January 1930) was a road sweeper in London and founder of the working class tradition of Pearly Kings and Queens.

== Early years ==
Croft was born at the St Pancras Workhouse in Somers Town, London, and baptised there on 5 June 1861. He was raised in an orphanage after his father, a musician, died in around 1871. He worked as a municipal road sweeper from around 1876, employed by St Pancras vestry and later St Pancras Metropolitan Borough Council until the 1920s.

== Career ==
Croft started to wear his pearly suit to raise money for charity in the late 1870s. The origin of the pearly tradition is obscure. Croft began to decorate his clothes with mother-of-pearl buttons, which were mass-produced at factories in the East End of London. The inspiration for this form of decoration is a matter of debate. It may have been inspired by the clothes of costermongers (street vendors of fruit and vegetables) in Somers Town: some sources mention a common practice of adding decorative metal buttons to their plain clothes, others indicate that it was unknown. Croft himself was never a costermonger. Alternatively, the costume may also have been inspired by coster singers – such as Hyram Travers who performed as the "Pearly King" – or the stage clothes of other music hall entertainers.

By 1880, Croft was wearing a "smother" suit completely covered with thousands of white buttons. He later created more sparsely decorated "skeleton" suits. He is thought to have made at least seven suits to wear himself, two of which he left in his will. He also made pearly clothes – suits, hats, belts, and ties – for others. The suit would have drawn attention to Croft when he participated in charitable pageants and carnivals to raise money for local hospitals, an important source of funding before the National Health Service. Croft wore his pearly suit to raise funds for the London Temperance Hospital in the 1880, but the first surviving reference to him in a printed source is a photograph and accompanying letter in The Strand Magazine in February 1902, which describes "Mr F. Croft" as the "Pearlie King of Somers Town".

Croft was presented to Edward VII and Queen Alexandra at the Horse of the Year Show at Olympia in 1907, and led a display by costermongers and their donkeys at the show in 1912. By 1911, all 28 of the metropolitan boroughs of London had its own pearly king, pearly queen, and pearly family, often members of the local costermonger community. The Original Pearly Kings' and Queens' Association was established that year. South of the River Thames, the pearly families were associated into a Pearly Kings' and Queens' Guild. In July 1926, he claimed publicly that he was the "original Pearly-King in London".

Croft raised money for a variety of hospitals and other charities, including St Dunstan's, the Hospital Saturday Fund, and the Sons of Phoenix temperance society. He received a medal from the Lord Mayor of London for raising £72 following the 1928 Thames flood. He is thought to have received around 2,000 medals and ribbons to recognise his fund-raising efforts, which were estimated to have totalled around £4,000 to £5,000.

== Death and legacy ==
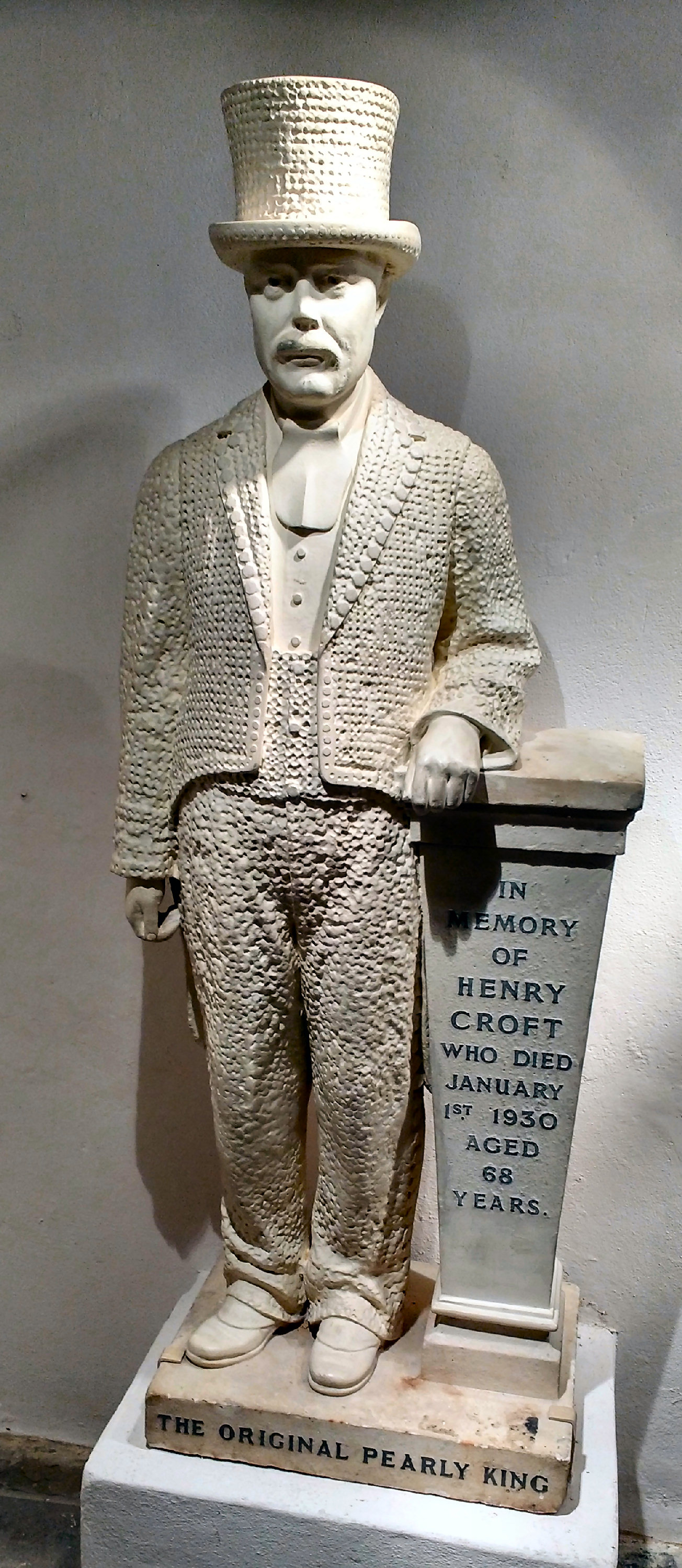
Statue, St Martin in the Fields

Croft died from lung cancer in St Pancras workhouse, where he had been born more than 68 years earlier. He was buried at St Pancras Cemetery in East Finchley. His funeral cortège stretched for approximately half a mile, with a procession that included a horse-drawn hearse, musicians, 400 pearly kings and queens, and representatives from the charities that he had supported. The event was filmed by Pathé News. (Ian Dury requested that the same hearse was to be used at his funeral in April 2000.)

=== Croft's family and memory ===
Croft had married Lily Newton on 21 February 1892, at Bedford New Town Chapel in St Pancras. He was survived by his wife and by eleven of their twelve children, his eldest son having been killed in action in the First World War.

A life-sized marble statue of Croft, standing 5 feet (1.5 m) high, wearing a "smother" pearly tail-coat with top hat and cane, was commissioned in 1931 and erected at his burial site in 1934. After being vandalised several times, the statue was restored and removed to the crypt of St Martin-in-the-Fields in 2002, where the Original Pearly Kings and Queens Society has held its harvest festival since 1956. Perpetuating the family tradition, Croft's great-granddaughter later became pearly queen of Somers Town.
