= Bernard Randolph (cricketer) =

English cricketer

Personal information
- Full name: Bernard Montgomery Randolph
- Born: 10 April 1834; Much Hadham, Hertfordshire, England
- Died: 3 July 1857 (aged 23); Oxford, Oxfordshire, England
- Batting: Unknown
- Bowling: Unknown
- Relatives: Leveson Randolph (brother)

Domestic team information
- Years: Team
- 1856: Sussex
- 1855–1857: Oxford University

Career statistics
Competition	First-class
Matches	7
Runs scored	207
Batting average	15.92
100s/50s	–/1
Top score	61
Balls bowled	52
Wickets	1
Bowling average	20.00
5 wickets in innings	–
10 wickets in match	–
Best bowling	1/6
Catches/stumpings	4/–
- Source: Cricinfo, 29 September 2012

Bernard Montgomery Randolph (10 April 1834 – 3 July 1857) was an English cricketer. Randolph's batting and bowling styles are unknown. He was born at Much Hadham, Hertfordshire, and was educated at Charterhouse School and Christ Church, Oxford.

Randolph made his first-class debut for Oxford University against the Marylebone Cricket Club in 1855 at the Magdalen Ground, Oxford. He made two further first-class appearances for the university in that season, before making two further appearances in 1856. It was in 1856 that he made a single first-class appearance for Sussex against Surrey at the Royal Brunswick Ground, Hove. He made a final first-class appearance for Oxford University in 1857 against the Marylebone Cricket Club. In his six first-class appearances for the university, he scored 199 runs at an average of 18.09, with a high score of 61. This score came against Cambridge University in 1855.

He died at 3 July 1857 at Christ Church, Oxford, while still undertaking his studies. His brother, Leveson, also played first-class cricket for Oxford University. His nephew was John Randolph, the Suffragan Bishop of Guildford.
