= George Sumner (bishop of Guildford) =

English bishop (1824–1909)

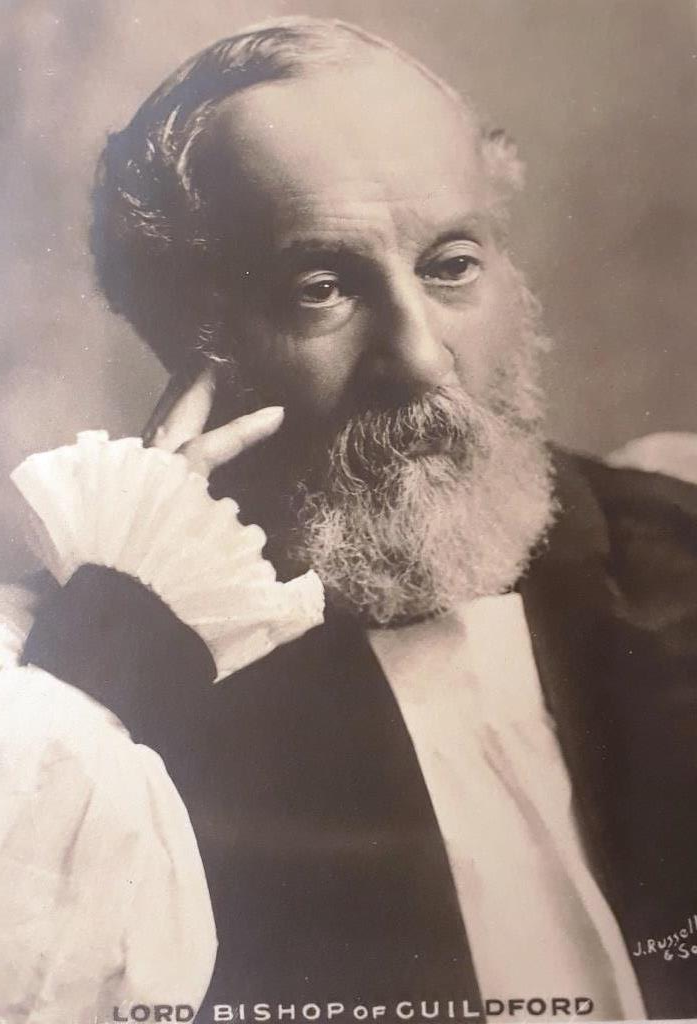
Rt Rev George Sumner, Bishop of Guilldford

George Henry Sumner (3 July 1824 – 11 December 1909) was the Bishop of Guildford (a suffragan bishop in the Diocese of Winchester) at the end of the 19th century and the beginning of the 20th century.

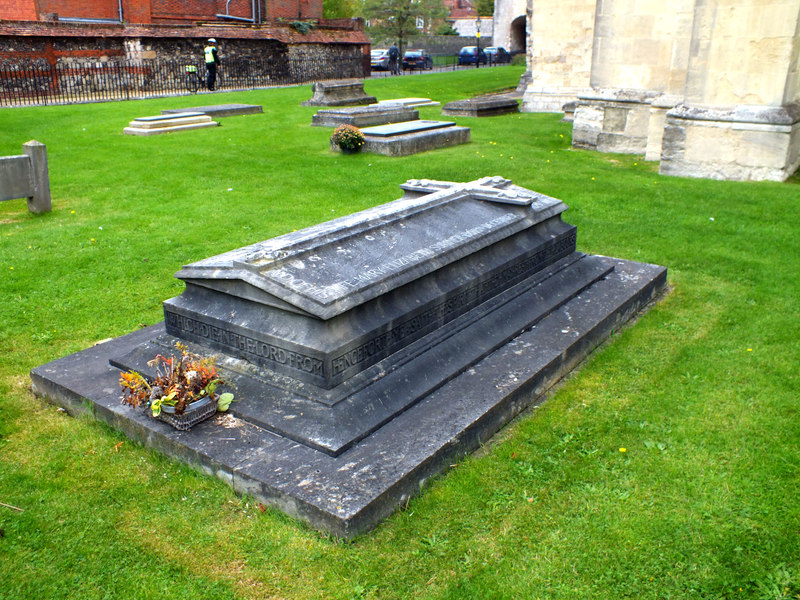
Tomb of Sumner and his wife

Born into an ecclesiastical family — his father, Charles Sumner, was Bishop of Winchester from 1827 until 1869 — and educated at Eton College and Balliol College, Oxford, he was ordained to the priesthood in 1847. His first position was a curacy in Crawley after which he was the Rector of Old Alresford and then the Archdeacon of Winchester before his ordination to the episcopate, nine years after the death of his predecessor John Utterton.

In 1904, Sumner was ageing but not ready to retire fully, so a new suffragan See of Dorking was erected and Cecil Boutflower was appointed Bishop of Dorking early the next year. When Boutflower departed for Japan, Sumner resigned the See in early 1909 (before John Randolph's consecration on 21 February 1909) and Randolph was appointed Bishop of Guildford, succeeding Boutflower in duties and Sumner in the See.

His wife, Mary Sumner, was the founder of the Mothers’ Union.

Church of England titles
Vacant Title last held by John Utterton	Bishop suffragan of Guildford; 1888–1909	Succeeded by John Randolph
