= Cecil Boutflower =

British Anglican bishop (1863–1942)

- Bishop of Southampton
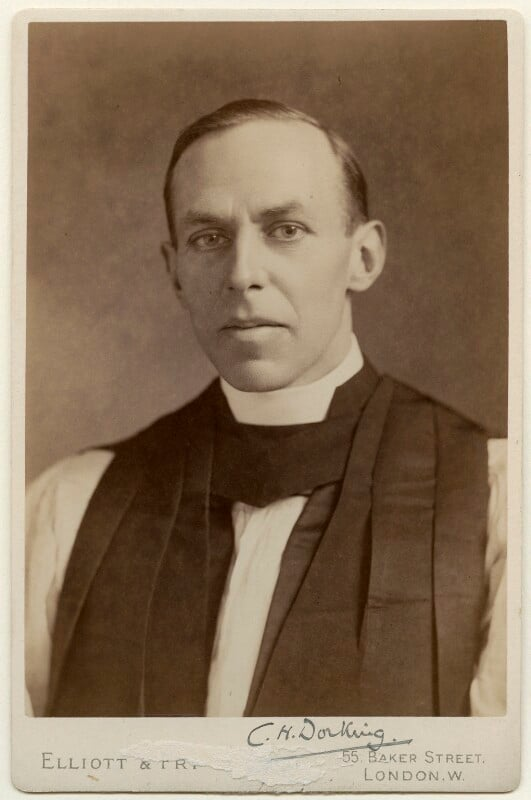
- Boutflower in 1905
- Diocese: Diocese of Winchester
- In office: 1921–1933 (ret.)
- Predecessor: James Macarthur
- Successor: Kenneth Healey
- Other posts: Archdeacon of Furness (1901–1905); Bishop of Dorking (1905–1909); Bishop of South Tokyo (1909–1921)

Orders
- Ordination: 1887
- Consecration: 1905 by Randall Davidson (Canterbury)

Personal details
- Born: 15 August 1863
- Died: 19 March 1942 (aged 78)
- Denomination: Anglican
- Education: Christ Church, Oxford

Cecil Henry Boutflower /ˈboʊflaʊər/ (15 August 1863 – 19 March 1942) was an Anglican bishop who served both at home and abroad.

He was born at Brathay, Windermere, into a distinguished clerical family, the fourth son of The Ven Samuel Peach Boutflower, Archdeacon of Carlisle, by his second wife, Margaret Redmayne, daughter of Giles Redmayne of Brathay Hall and sister of George Tunstal Redmayne. His elder half-brother The Rev Douglas Samuel Boutflower was Rural Dean of Easington. He was educated at Uppingham and Christ Church, Oxford. Ordained in 1887, he began his career with a curacy at St Mary, South Shields and was then successively Chaplain to the Bishop of Durham, Vicar (then Archdeacon) of Barrow-in-Furness before ascending to the episcopate, where he was to serve in three posts until retirement.

In 1904, George Sumner, Bishop suffragan of Guildford in the Diocese of Winchester was ageing but not fully retired, so a new suffragan See of Dorking was erected and Boutflower was appointed Bishop of Dorking early the next year; He was consecrated a bishop by Randall Davidson, Archbishop of Canterbury, in Westminster Abbey on the Feast of the Conversion of St Paul (25 January) 1905. His appointment as the only bishop of Dorking was, functionally, an interruption in the See of Guildford; Boutflower took on suffragan duties in the north of the diocese. When Boutflower departed England for missionary duty in Japan at the start of 1909 (or very end of 1908), Sumner was persuaded to resign the See and John Randolph was appointed Bishop of Guildford, succeeding Boutflower in duties and Sumner in the see.

He served in Japan as bishop in South Tokyo until he was appointed again as a suffragan for the Winchester, this time Bishop of Southampton. That See was resigned by his predecessor on 30 April 1921; Boutflower had recently returned to England and held the See by Ascension Day (5 May). He had returned to England in ill-health, held a canonry at Winchester Cathedral with his See; and eventually retired effective 30 September 1933, having been in ill health again for at least seven months prior.

A staunch advocate of missionary service, he married late in life, in 1933, to Joyce Segar, daughter of Halsall Segar, a priest.

Church of England titles
Preceded by George Sumner as Bishop suffragan of Guildford	Bishop of Dorking; 1905 – 1909	Succeeded by John Randolph as Bishop suffragan of Guildford
Preceded by William Awdry	Bishop of South Tokyo; 1909 – 1921	Succeeded by Samuel Heaslett
Preceded by James Macarthur	Bishop of Southampton; 1921–1933	Succeeded by Arthur Karney
