= David Wilcox (bishop) =

British Anglican bishop

The Right Reverend David Wilcox
- Bishop of Dorking
- Church: Church of England
- Diocese: Diocese of Guildford
- In office: 1986–1995
- Predecessor: Kenneth Evans
- Successor: Ian Brackley
- Other post: Honorary assistant bishop in Diocese of Chichester (1995–2025)

Orders
- Ordination: 1954 (deacon); 1955 (priest) by Bertram Simpson
- Consecration: c. 1986 by Robert Runcie

Personal details
- Born: 29 June 1930 (age 96)
- Denomination: Anglican
- Spouse: Pamela Hedges
- Children: 2 sons, 2 daughters
- Education: St John's College, Oxford

David Peter Wilcox (29 June 1930 - 8 December 2025) was a retired British Anglican bishop. He was the Bishop of Dorking, a suffragan bishop in the Diocese of Guildford.

== Early life and education ==
Wilcox was educated at Northampton Grammar School and St John's College, Oxford. He married Pamela Hedges in 1956 and they had two sons and two daughters.

== Ordained ministry ==
Ordained a deacon on Trinity Sunday (13 June) 1954 by Bertram Simpson, Bishop of Southwark, in Southwark Cathedral and a priest the following year, he began his career with a curacy at St Helier, St Peter (Bishop Andrewes Church) Hammersmith in the Southwark Diocese and was then successively: a lecturer at Lincoln Theological College; a USPG missionary in Bangalore; vicar of Great Gransden; and canon residentiary of Derby Cathedral. From 1977 to 1985, he was concurrently principal of Ripon College Cuddesdon and vicar of the Church of All Saints, Cuddesdon.

He was then appointed to the episcopate as Bishop suffragan of Dorking — a post he held from 1986 until 1995. He was ordained and consecrated a bishop (thereby taking up his suffragan See) on 30 January 1986, by Robert Runcie, Archbishop of Canterbury, at Southwark Cathedral. In retirement he continued to minister, as an honorary assistant bishop within the Diocese of Chichester.

Wilcox was criticised in 2007 for having failed to inform police of a case of child abuse involving a church choirmaster in 1990. This was one of several cases across the Church of England which led to Archbishop Rowan Williams announcing the Past Case Review, an exercise in which independent reviewers were appointed by each diocese to review files on clergy and other employees.

His son Pete Wilcox is Bishop of Sheffield.
