= Jo Bailey Wells =

Bishop, priest and academic

The Right Reverend Jo Bailey Wells
- Bishop of Dorking
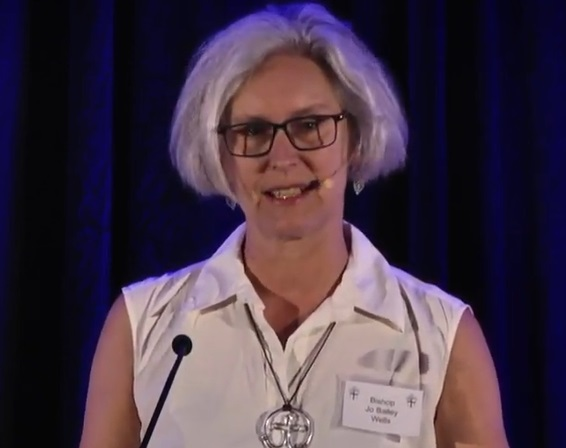
- Wells in 2022
- Church: Church of England
- Diocese: Guildford
- In office: 29 June 2016 to January 2023
- Predecessor: Ian Brackley
- Other posts: Bishop for Episcopal Ministry, Anglican Communion Office (2023–present)
- Previous post: Chaplain to the Archbishop of Canterbury (2013–2016)

Orders
- Ordination: 1995 (deacon); 1996 (priest)
- Consecration: 29 June 2016 by Justin Welby

Personal details
- Born: Joanne Caladine Bailey; 24 June 1965 (age 61) Bradford, England
- Denomination: Anglicanism
- Spouse: Sam Wells
- Children: Two
- Occupation: Theologian; Biblical scholar Priest
- Education: Corpus Christi College, Cambridge; University of Minnesota; St John's College, Durham

Joanne Caladine Bailey Wells (née Bailey; born 24 June 1965) is a British Anglican bishop, theologian, and academic. Since January 2023, she has served at the Anglican Communion Office in London as "Bishop for Episcopal Ministry". Previously, she was a lecturer in the Old Testament and biblical theology at Ridley Hall, Cambridge, and then associate professor of Bible and Ministry at Duke Divinity School, Duke University, North Carolina. From 2013 until 2016, she had served as Chaplain to the Archbishop of Canterbury; she was then Bishop of Dorking, a suffragan bishop in the Diocese of Guildford, 2016–2023.

== Early life and education ==
Wells was born on 24 June 1965 in Bradford, West Yorkshire, England. She was educated at Queenswood School, an all-girls private school in Hertfordshire, and attended sixth form at Marlborough College, an independent school in Wiltshire. She took a gap year before university, and spent some time at a Christian mission in Transkei, South Africa.

She matriculated into Corpus Christi College, Cambridge in 1984, only the second year that the college admitted women, to study Natural Sciences. She graduated with a Bachelor of Arts (BA) degree in 1987: as per tradition, her BA was promoted to a Master of Arts (MA Cantab) degree in 1990. During her time at Cambridge, she was awarded a half-blue for ice hockey. She was awarded a Rotarian scholarship to continue her studies at a university in America. She chose to study intercultural communication at the University of Minnesota. While in the United States, she became involved in the Episcopal Church and was a youth pastor at the Messiah Episcopal Church in Saint Paul, Minnesota. She graduated with a post-graduate Master of Arts (MA) degree in 1989 or 1990.

While in America, she felt the call to ordination, and returned to England. She studied theology at St John's College, Durham, graduating with a second BA in 1992. She then trained for ordained ministry at Cranmer Hall, Durham, an Anglican theological college that is part of St John's College. When she started theological college, women were not yet ordained as priests in the Church of England. She continued her studies, and graduated from the University of Durham with a Doctor of Philosophy (PhD) degree in 1997. Her doctoral thesis was titled "A holy nation: Israel's call to holiness in a canonical perspective".

== Ordained ministry ==
Wells was ordained in the Church of England as a deacon in 1995 and as a priest in 1996. From 1995 to 2001, she was part of the ministry team of Clare College, Cambridge: she served as chaplain from 1995 to 1998 and as dean from 1998 to 2001. Having been ordained into a chaplaincy post, she missed out on the usual curacy training post.

From 1997 to 2001, Wells was Director of Studies in theology at Clare College, Cambridge and an affiliated lecturer in the Faculty of Divinity, University of Cambridge. From 2001 to 2005, she was a lecturer in Old Testament and Biblical theology at Ridley Hall, Cambridge, an Anglican theological college. She also served as the college's pastoral tutor. From 2005 to 2012, she was an associate professor of Bible and Ministry at Duke Divinity School and director of its Anglican Episcopal House of Studies.

In February 2013, Wells was named as the next chaplain to the Archbishop of Canterbury. Her first duty as chaplain was to carry the primatial cross at the enthronement of the new Archbishop of Canterbury, Justin Welby, at Canterbury Cathedral on 21 March 2013. She had known Welby when they were both students at Durham. She was also made a Canon Theologian of Liverpool Cathedral in 2015.

=== Episcopal ministry ===
On 24 March 2016, Wells was announced as the next Bishop of Dorking, a suffragan bishopric in the Diocese of Guildford. She was consecrated a bishop on 29 June 2016 by Justin Welby, the Archbishop of Canterbury, during a service at Canterbury Cathedral.

On 17 October 2022, it was announced that Wells would be leaving Guildford to become the Bishop for Episcopal Ministry in the Anglican Communion; she took up the post in January 2023 and is based in the Anglican Communion Office. According to Bishop Anthony Poggo, Secretary General of the Anglican Communion, this new role was designed to "foster a collaborative, engaged, enriched fellowship among the bishops of the Anglican Communion, inspiring ever greater companionship, learning and interchange between provinces." On February 5, 2024, she was one of two women to meet with Pope Francis and his Council of Cardinal Advisors, and spoke with them about her experience as an ordained woman and about the Anglican Church's journey to the ordination of women.

== Personal life ==
In 1994, Bailey married Sam Wells, a Church of England priest. They have two children: a son and a daughter.

== Selected works ==
- Wells, Jo Bailey (2000). God's Holy People: a theme in Biblical theology. Sheffield: Sheffield University Press. ISBN 978-1841270968.
- Killingray, Margaret; Wells, Jo Bailey (2000). Using the Ten Commandments. Cambridge: Grove Books Ltd. ISBN 978-1851744435.
- Wells, Jo Bailey (2006). Isaiah: A Devotional Commentary for Study and Preaching. Oxford: Bible Reading Fellowship. ISBN 978-1841011516.
