= Cyril Randolph =

English cricketer and clergyman

Personal information
- Full name: Cyril Randolph
- Born: 9 February 1826; Eastry, Kent, England
- Died: 29 May 1912 (aged 86); Chartham, Kent, England
- Batting: Unknown
- Bowling: Unknown
- Relatives: Leveson Randolph (cousin)

Domestic team information
- Years: Team
- 1844–1847: Oxford University

Career statistics
Competition	First-class
Matches	11
Runs scored	99
Batting average	5.82
100s/50s	–/–
Top score	24
Balls bowled	769
Wickets	47
Bowling average	17.62
5 wickets in innings	3
10 wickets in match	1
Best bowling	8/?
Catches/stumpings	4/–
- Source: Cricinfo, 10 August 2019

Cyril Randolph (9 February 1826 – 29 May 1912) was an English first-class cricketer and clergyman.

The only son of the Reverend George Randolph and his wife, Catherine Elizabeth Drummond, he was born on 9 February 1826. He was educated at Eton College, before going up to Christ Church, Oxford. While studying at Oxford, he made his debut in first-class cricket for Oxford University against the Marylebone Cricket Club at Oxford in 1844. He played first-class cricket for Oxford until 1847, making seven appearances. Playing as a bowler, he took 39 wickets for Oxford. He took five wickets in an innings on three occasions and ten wickets in a match once. In addition to playing first-class cricket for Oxford, he also appeared twice each for the Gentlemen of England and the Gentlemen of Kent.

After graduating from Oxford he became an Anglican clergyman. He was the curate of Riverhead, Kent from 1850–63, before becoming the rector of Staple, Kent from 1863–73. He served as the rector of Chartham from 1873 until his death in May 1912. He married Frances Selina Hervey in 1851, with the couple having eleven children. His wife predeceased him by one year.
