= Bishop of Dorking =

Anglican church office

The Bishop of Dorking is an episcopal title used by a suffragan bishop of the Church of England Diocese of Guildford, in the Province of Canterbury, England. The title takes its name from the town of Dorking in Surrey. However, the bishop of Dorking lives in Guildford.

The first suffragan bishop was appointed for the Diocese of Winchester; the see's erection in 1904 and Boutflower's appointment in 1905 was in order to supplement the work of the suffragan bishops of Southampton and of Guildford — the latter, George Sumner, was ageing. The appointment of the only bishop of Dorking for that diocese was, functionally, an interruption in the See of Guildford; Boutflower took on suffragan duties in the north of the diocese. When Boutflower departed for missionary duty in Japan, Sumner was persuaded to resign the See of Guildford and John Randolph was appointed bishop suffragan of Guildford, succeeding Boutflower in duties and Sumner in his see.

Winchester diocese was subdivided in 1927 to create what is now the Diocese of Guildford, in which the appointment of bishops of Dorking resumed in 1968.

== List of the bishops of Dorking ==
Bishops of Dorking
From	Until	Incumbent	Notes
1905	1909	Cecil Boutflower	Suffragan for north of Winchester diocese (see Bishop suffragan of Guildford) Translated to South Tokyo, and later to Southampton.
1909	1968	in abeyance	
1968	1986	Kenneth Evans	
1986	1996	David Wilcox	
1996	2015	Ian Brackley	Retired 30 September 2015.
2016	2023	Jo Bailey Wells	From her consecration, on 29 June 2016; resigned c. January 2023.
2023	present	Paul Davies	Consecrated 29 September 2023.
