= Sam Wells (priest) =

Anglican clergy (born 1965)

The Reverend Canon Sam Wells
- Vicar of St Martin-in-the-Fields
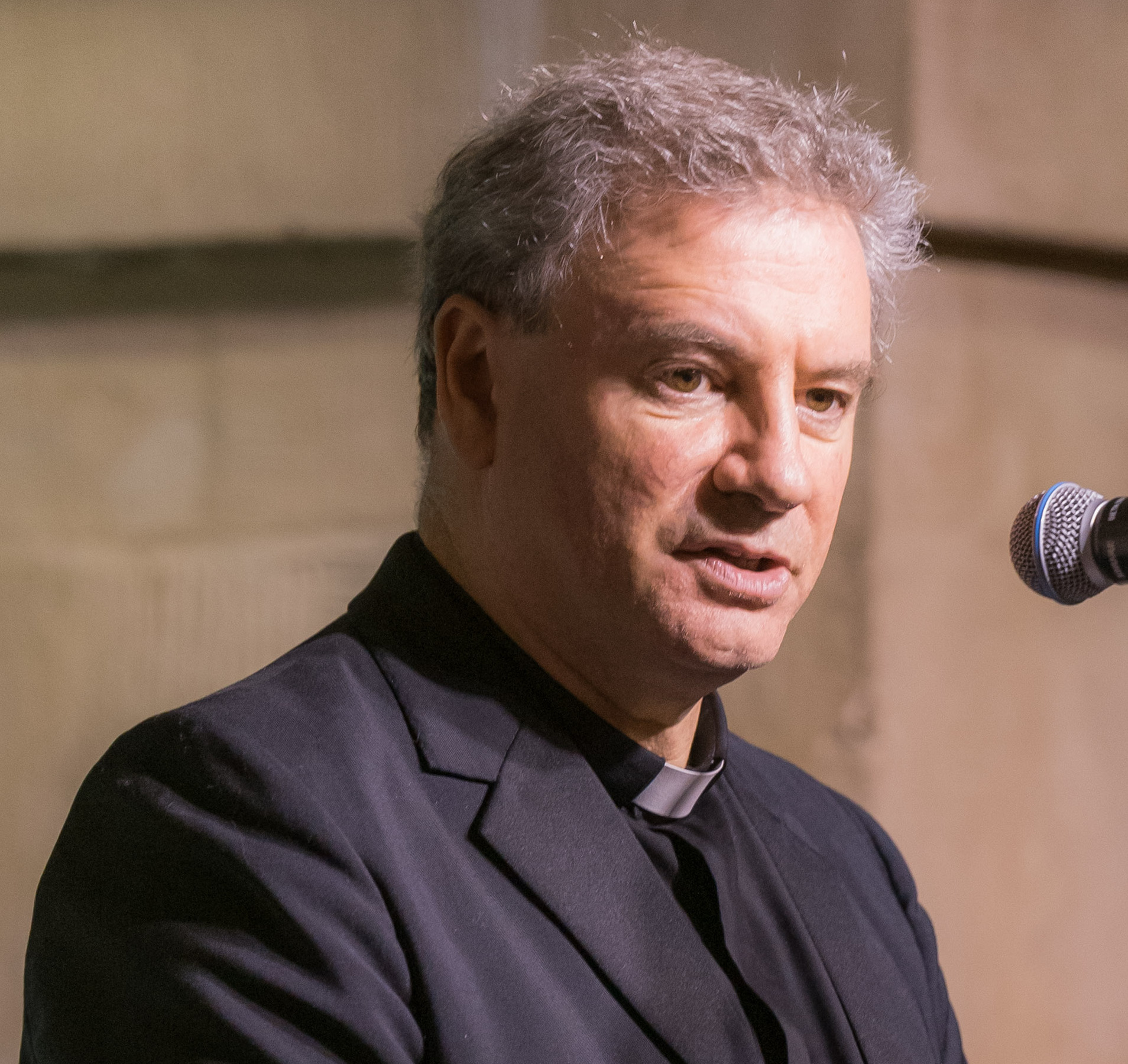
- Wells preaching in 2023
- Church: Church of England
- Diocese: London
- In office: 2012
- Previous post: Dean of Duke Chapel (2005–2012)

Orders
- Ordination: 1991 (deacon); 1992 (priest)

Personal details
- Born: 1965 (age 60–61)
- Denomination: Anglican
- Spouse: Jo Wells
- Children: Two
- Profession: Priest, theologian
- Education: Merton College, Oxford; New College, Edinburgh; Durham University

Samuel Martin Bailey Wells (born 1965) is an English priest of the Church of England. Since 2012, he has been the vicar of St Martin-in-the-Fields in central London, and visiting professor of Christian Ethics at King's College London. In 2018, he was installed as Honorary Canon Theologian of Guildford Cathedral.

== Early life and education ==
Wells was born in 1965 in Chatham, Ontario, Canada, to Stephen Wells, an Anglican priest, and Ruth Wells (née Moran), a midwife. The family moved to England when he was an infant. He was educated at Bristol Grammar School; originally an all-boys direct grant grammar school when he joined, the school became an independent school in 1979 and mixed sex in 1980.

Having won a scholarship, he studied modern history at Merton College, Oxford, and graduated in 1987 with a Bachelor of Arts (BA) degree; as per tradition, his BA was promoted to a Master of Arts (MA Oxon) degree. From 1987 to 1988, he was a pastoral assistant at St Luke-in-the-City, Liverpool, In 1988, he entered Edinburgh Theological College to train for ordination. During his time at theological college, he also studied systematic theology at New College, University of Edinburgh, and graduated in 1991 with a Bachelor of Divinity (BD) degree. He later undertook post-graduate study in Christian ethics at Durham University, and received his Doctor of Philosophy (PhD) degree in 1996. His doctoral thesis was titled "How the Church performs Jesus' story: improvising on the theological ethics of Stanley Hauerwas".

== Ordained ministry ==
Wells was ordained in the Church of England as a deacon in 1991 and as a priest in 1992. From 1991 to 1994, he served his curacy at St Luke's Church, Wallsend, in the Diocese of Newcastle; the vicar was John Inge, later to become Bishop of Worcester. He then moved to the Diocese of Ely where he became a curate of the parish of St Andrew's, Cherry Hinton, with All Saints, Teversham. From 1997 to 2003, he was priest-in-charge of St Elizabeth's Church, Earlham, Norwich in the Diocese of Norwich. He was additionally rural dean of Norwich South between 1999 and 2003. He then returned to the Diocese of Ely, and was priest-in-charge of St Mark's, Newnham, Cambridge, from 2003 to 2005.

He served in parish appointments for 14 years in Newcastle, Cambridge and Norwich, of which spent ten years of his ministry in areas of social disadvantage. For six years he was involved in establishing a community-led development trust, called the North Earlham, Larkman and Marlpit Development Trust. Wells was also involved in the 'Body, Mind and Spirit' project at St Elizabeth's Earlham, offering children opportunities to participate in creative play.

=== Dean of Duke Chapel ===
In 2005, Wells became dean of Duke Chapel and research professor of Christian ethics at Duke Divinity School, North Carolina. He developed and chaired the Faith Council, which consists of 12 members from different faith traditions. He initiated dialogue and led discussions on faith and ethics.

While acting as the Dean at Duke Chapel, Wells coordinated the ministry and music of the chapel, preached and led worship. He also oversaw the campus ministries and taught in the divinity school and the school of public policy. He worked with the local Durham community through organisations such as the Religious Coalitions for a Nonviolent Durham to foster a closer relationship with the university and the city.

=== Vicar of St Martin-in-the-Fields ===
Since 2012, Wells has been the vicar of St Martin-in-the-Fields in central London. He was inducted by Richard Chartres, Bishop of London, on 2 July 2012. As vicar, in addition to his pastoral ministry, Wells is a trustee of The Connection at St Martin's, and of the St Martin-in-the-Fields Trust. From 2014, he has been a regular contributor to Thought for the Day on BBC Radio 4.

In his review of How Then Shall We Live?, Walter Brueggemann wrote, "Sam Wells arguably has the liveliest, most agile, best informed, critically disciplined mind in the entire Christian community. And he has a baptised heart of honesty, compassion, and passion to match his baptized mind. In this book he ranges over a cluster of complex issues and at every turn his sound judgement instructs us as he moves easily from life to Scripture and back through church tradition. This book will serve many of us well who live with daily perplexities that admit no resolution."

== Personal life ==
In 1994, Wells married to Jo Bailey Wells, later an Anglican bishop. They have two children; a son and a daughter.

== Publications ==
- Constructing an Incarnational Theology: A Christocentric View of God's Purpose (Cambridge University Press 2025)
- How to Preach: Times, Seasons, Texts and Contexts (Norwich: Canterbury 2023)
- The Moment of Truth: Reflections on Incarnation and Resurrection (Norwich: Canterbury 2023)
- Living God's Future Now: Conversations with Contemporary Prophets (Norwich: Canterbury 2022)
- Act Justly: Practices to reshape the world (Norwich: Canterbury 2022)
- Being With: A Course Exploring Christian Faith and Life: Leaders' Guide (Norwich: Canterbury 2022)
- Humbler Faith, Bigger God: Finding a Story to Live By (Grand Rapids: Eerdmans: Norwich: Canterbury 2022)
- Finding Abundance in Scarcity: Steps to Church Transformation (edited, Norwich: Canterbury 2021)
- A Cross in the Heart of God: Reflections on the Death of Jesus (Norwich: Canterbury 2020)
- Love Mercy: The Twelve Steps of Forgiveness (Norwich: Canterbury 2020)
- In Conversation: Samuel Wells and Stanley Hauerwas with Stanley Hauerwas, facilitated by Maureen Knudsen Langdoc (New York: Church Publishing 2020)
- With. Thoughts One Can't Do Without (Milan: Juxta 2020)
- The Heart of it All: The Bible's Big Picture (Norwich: Canterbury 2019)
- A Future that's Bigger than the Past: Catalysing Kingdom Communities (Norwich: Canterbury 2019)
- Walk Humbly: Encouragements for Living, Working, and Being (Grand Rapids: Eerdmans: Norwich: Canterbury 2018)
- Face-to-Face: Meeting Christ in Friend and Stranger (Norwich: Canterbury 2019: Nashville: Abingdon 2020)
- Liturgy on the Edge: Pastoral and Attractional Worship (edited, Norwich: Canterbury 2018)
- Who Is My Neighbour? The Global and Personal Challenge (edited, with Richard Carter, London: SPCK 2018)
- Incarnational Mission: Being with the World (Grand Rapids and Norwich: Eerdmans and Canterbury 2018)
- For Good: The Church and the Future of Welfare (with David Barclay and Russell Rook, Norwich: Canterbury 2017)
- Incarnational Ministry: Being with the Church (Grand Rapids and Norwich: Eerdmans and Canterbury 2017)
- Hanging by a Thread: The Questions of the Cross (Norwich: Canterbury 2016; New York: Church Publishing 2018)
- Eucharistic Prayers (with Abigail Kocher, Grand Rapids: Eerdmans 2016)
- Joining the Angels' Song: Eucharistic Prayers for Sundays and Holy Days, Years A, B & C (with Abigail Kocher, Norwich: Canterbury 2016)
- How Then Shall We Live? Christian Engagement with Contemporary Issues (Norwich: Canterbury 2016 and New York: Church Publishing 2017)
- A Nazareth Manifesto: Being with God (Oxford: Wiley-Blackwell 2015)
- Shaping the Prayers of the People: The Art of Intercession (with Abigail Kocher, Grand Rapids: Eerdmans, 2014)
- Crafting Prayers for Public Worship: The Art of Intercession (Norwich: Canterbury, 2013)
- Esther and Daniel: Brazos Commentary on the Bible (with George Sumner, Grand Rapids, MI: Brazos, 2013)
- Learning to Dream Again: Rediscovering the Heart of God (Grand Rapids: Eerdmans 2013; UK edition, with substantial alterations, Norwich: Canterbury 2013)
- Be Not Afraid: Facing Fear with Faith (Grand Rapids, MI: Brazos, 2011)
- What Anglicans Believe: An Introduction (Norwich: SCM/Canterbury Press, 2011)
- What Episcopalians Believe: An Introduction (Harrisburg, PA: Church Publishing Inc., 2011)
- Living Without Enemies: Being Present in the Midst of Violence (with Marcia Owen; Downers Grove: IVP, 2011)
- Christian Ethics: An Introductory Reader (Oxford: Wiley-Blackwell, 2010)
- Introducing Christian Ethics (with Ben Quash; Oxford: Wiley-Blackwell, 2010); second edition (with Ben Quash and Rebekah Eklund, Oxford: Wiley-Blackwell, 2017)
- Liturgy Comes to Life (Durham, NC: Duke Chapel, 2010)
- Living Out Loud (with Stanley Hauerwas; edited by Luke Bretherton, et al.; London: Paternoster, 2010)
- Praying for England: Priestly Presence in Contemporary Culture (edited with Sarah Coakley; London and New York: Continuum, 2008)
- Speaking the Truth: Preaching in a Pluralistic Culture (Nashville: Abingdon, 2008) Revised and expanded edition (Norwich: Canterbury 2018)
- Power and Passion: Six Characters in Search of Resurrection (the Archbishop of Canterbury's Lent Book 2007; Grand Rapids: Zondervan, 2007)
- God's Companions: Reimagining Christian Ethics (Oxford: Blackwell, 2006)
- The Blackwell Companion to Christian Ethics (edited with Stanley Hauerwas; Oxford, UK; *Cambridge, MA: Blackwell, 2004; Second Edition, Revised and Expanded, 2011)
- Improvisation: The Drama of Christian Ethics (Grand Rapids, MI: Brazos; London: SPCK, 2004)
- Community-Led Estate Regeneration and the Local Church (Cambridge: Grove Booklets, 2003)
- Faithfulness and Fortitude: In Conversation with the Theological Ethics of Stanley Hauerwas (edited with Mark Thiessen Nation; Edinburgh: T & T Clark, 2000)
- Transforming Fate into Destiny: The Theological Ethics of Stanley Hauerwas (Carlisle: Paternoster, 1998; reissued Eugene, Oregon: Cascade, 2004)
