= John Utterton =

John Sutton Utterton was the first Bishop of Guildford (then a suffragan bishop in the Diocese of Winchester) in the last third of the 19th century.

Born in 1814 and educated at Oriel College, Oxford, he was perpetual curate of Holmwood, rector of Calbourne and then the Archdeacon of Surrey before his ordination to the episcopate. He was consecrated a bishop on 15 March 1874, by John Jackson, Bishop of London, at Lambeth Parish Church. He died on 21 December 1879, and his successor was not appointed until 1898.

The oak screen in front of the Guardian Angels' Chapel at Winchester Cathedral was erected in his memory in 1892

Church of England titles
Preceded by Inaugural appointment	Bishop of Guildford; 1874 –1879	Vacant Title next held by George Sumner
