= Pearly Kings and Queens =

Charitable figures of London boroughs

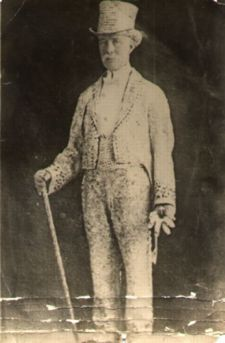
Henry Croft, the first Pearly King, c. 1900

Pearly Kings and Queens, known as pearlies, are an organised charitable tradition of working-class culture in London, England.

== Henry Croft ==
The practice of wearing clothes decorated with mother-of-pearl buttons is first associated with Henry Croft (1861–1930), an orphan street sweeper who collected money for charity. At the time, London costermongers (street traders) were in the habit of wearing trousers decorated at the seams with pearl buttons that had been found by market traders. In the late 1870s, Croft adapted this to create a sequin suit to draw attention to himself and aid his fund-raising activities. In 1911 an organised pearly society was formed in Finchley, north London.

Croft's funeral in January 1930 was attended by 400 followers and received national media coverage. In 1934, a memorial referring to Croft as "The original Pearly King" was unveiled in St Pancras Cemetery and in a speech to mark the occasion he was said to have raised £5,000 for those suffering in London's hospitals.

== Pearly organisations ==
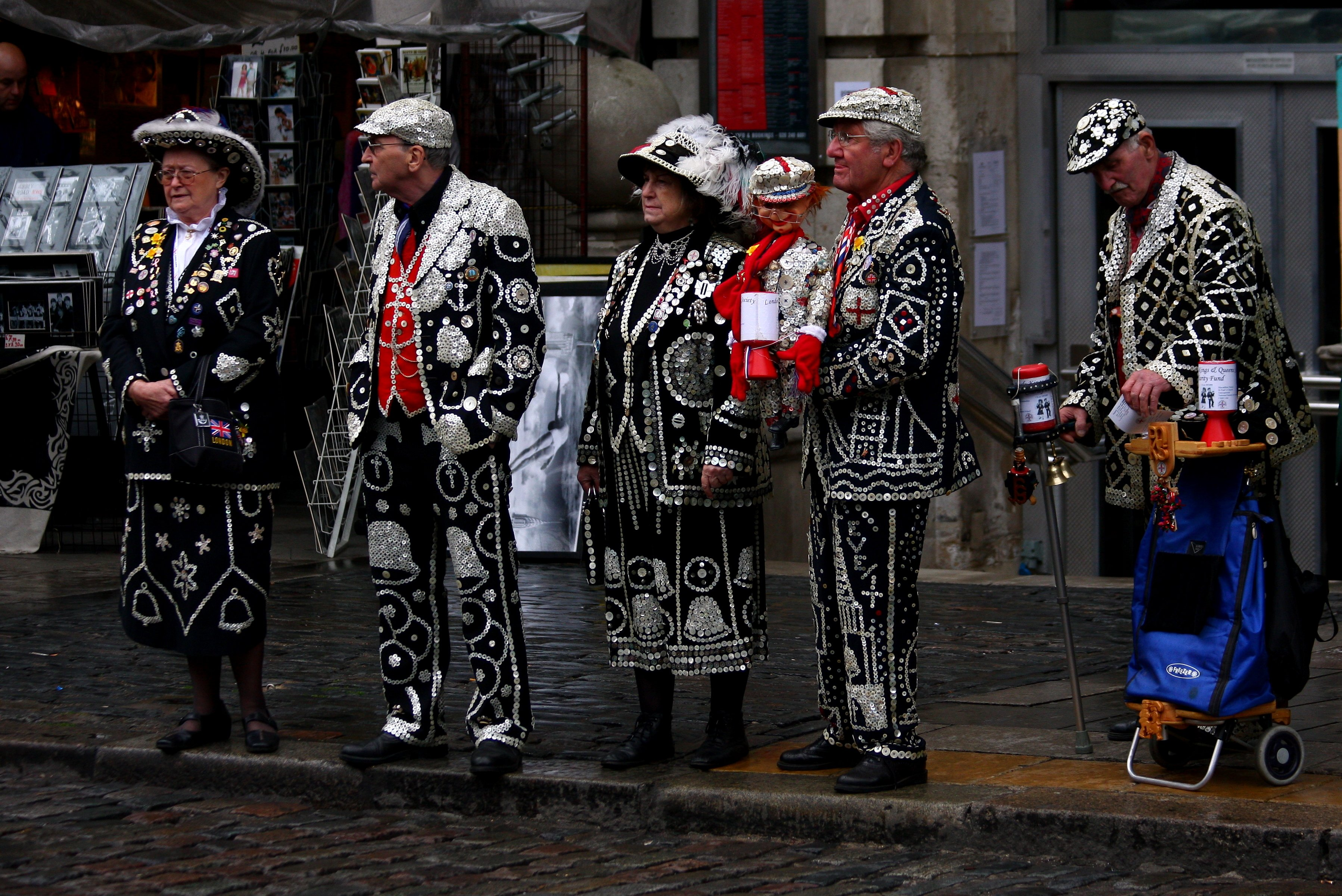
A group of Pearly Kings and Queens collecting for charity at Covent Garden in London, 2008

The pearlies are now divided into several active groups. Croft's founding organisation is called the Original London Pearly Kings and Queens Association. It was reformed in 1975 and holds the majority of the original pearly titles which are City of London, Westminster, Victoria, Hackney, Tower Hamlets, Shoreditch, Islington, Dalston and Hoxton. Other groups have also been established over the years. The oldest is the Pearly Guild, which began in 1902. Modern additions include the London Pearly Kings and Queens Society, which started in 2001and the Pearly Kings and Queens Guild. Despite the rivalries, each group is associated with a church in central London and is committed to raising money for London-based charities. A parade of real-life Pearly Kings and Queens was featured at the 2012 Summer Olympics Opening Ceremony.
