= Bernard Randolph (merchant) =

Bernard Randolph (baptised 1643 – c. 1690) was an English merchant and author on the Morea and Aegean islands.

== Life ==
Randolph was born in Canterbury, the son of Edmund Randolph M.D. and his wife Deborah Master; Edward Randolph was his elder brother. In 1664 he was a merchant at Smyrna in the Levant trade.

Randolph then visited the Morea and Mystras in 1669, shortly after a peace was concluded between the Venetian Republic and Ottoman Empire. He was resident in the mainland of Greece 1671–9. In 1680 he was in Crete.

In the period 1683–4 Randolph made voyages to New England, in support of his brother Edward's work there as a customs official. He then returned to England. He is thought to have died by about 1689.

== Works ==
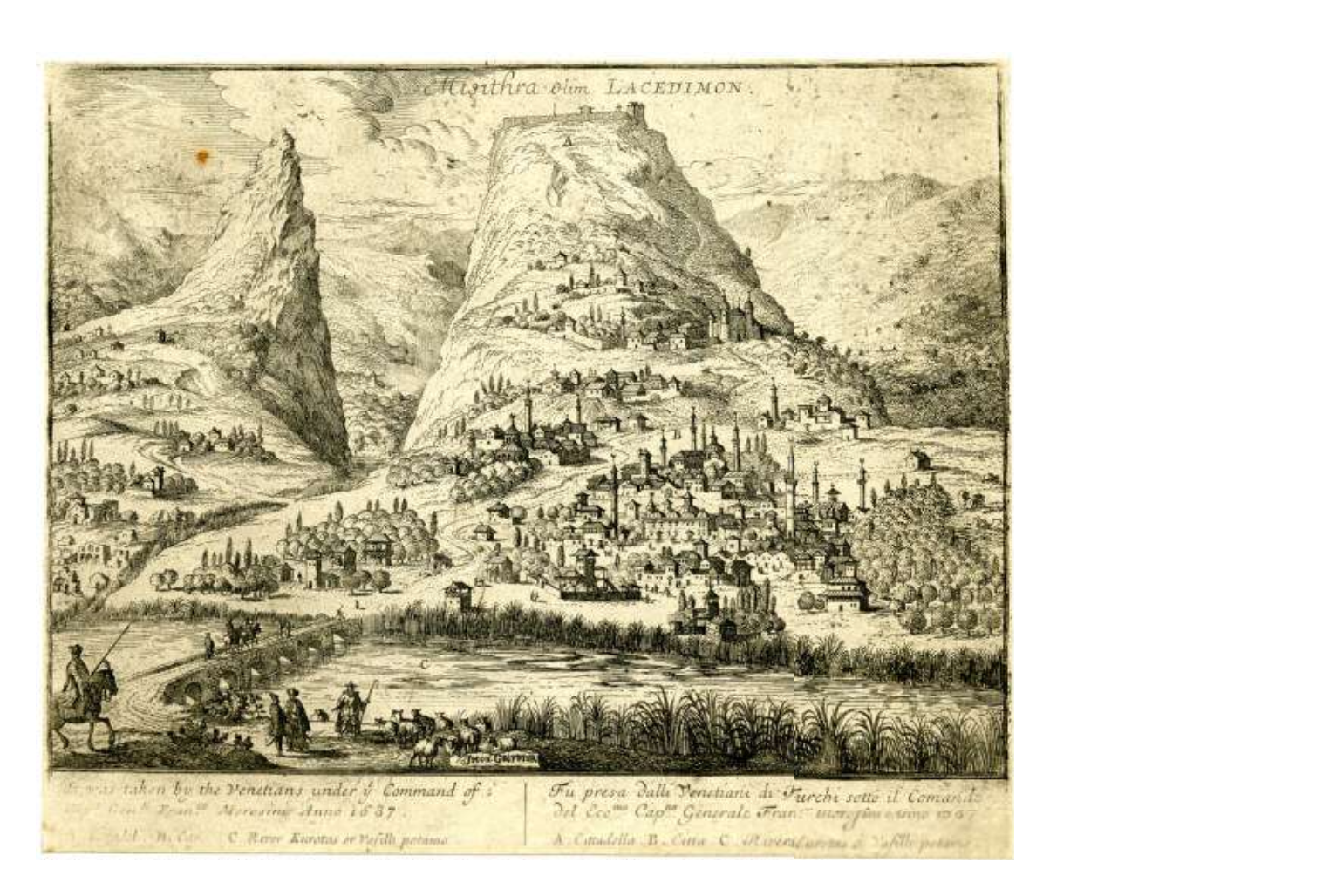
Misithra olim Lacedimon, engraving around 1687 of the attack by Venetian forces on Mystras, once wrongly thought to be the site of ancient Sparta

Randolph published:

- The Present State of the Morea (1686), illustrated with engravings from his own topographical drawings.
- The Present State of the Islands in the Archipelago (1687), travel writing on the Aegean islands and commentary on the Great Turkish War
