= John Randolph (bishop of Guildford) =

English bishop (1866–1936)

- Bishop of Guildford
- Diocese: Diocese of Winchester
- In office: 1909–1927 (res.)
- Predecessor: George Sumner
- Other post: Dean of Salisbury (1928–1935)

Orders
- Ordination: 1890
- Consecration: 1909 by Randall Davidson (Canterbury)

Personal details
- Born: 20 January 1866
- Died: 21 March 1936 (aged 70)
- Denomination: Anglican
- Education: Trinity College, Cambridge

John Hugh Granville Randolph (20 January 1866 – 21 March 1936) was the Bishop of Guildford (a suffragan bishop in the Diocese of Winchester) and then Dean of Salisbury in the Church of England in the first decades of the 20th century.

Randolph was born into an ecclesiastical family: his father was a priest, Leveson Randolph. Educated at Eton and Trinity College, Cambridge, he was ordained into the priesthood in 1890. His first post was a curacy in Margate, after which he was Vicar of All Saints’, Westbrook, then St Mark's, North End, before his appointment to the episcopate.

In late 1908/early 1909, Cecil Boutflower, Bishop of Dorking, a suffragan bishop in the Diocese of Winchester, departed for Japan; Boutflower had taken the See of Dorking only because George Sumner (Bishop of Guildford) did not resign his See; on Boutflower's resignation, Sumner was persuaded to resign the See of Guildford (by the time of Randolph's consecration). Therefore, Randolph was appointed as successor to both suffragans: to Boutflower in duties and Sumner in the see. He was consecrated on 21 February 1909, by Randall Davidson, Archbishop of Canterbury, at Lambeth Palace Chapel. Between the erection of the Diocese of Guildford on 1 May 1927 and his installation as Dean of Salisbury, he had no official post, but gave assistance to the bishops of Winchester, of Guildford and of Portsmouth. He became a Doctor of Divinity (DD).

Church of England titles
Preceded by George Sumner	Bishop suffragan of Guildford; 1909–1927	diocesan See established first bishop: John Greig
Preceded by Andrew Burn	Dean of Salisbury; 1928–1935	Succeeded by Edward Henderson
