= Bishop of Guildford (suffragan) =

Anglican suffragan bishop in England

The Bishop of Guildford was a suffragan bishop of the Church of England Diocese of Winchester in the Province of Canterbury.

In the late nineteenth century there were three suffragan bishops of Guildford appointed to assist six successive Bishops of Winchester, in overseeing the Diocese of Winchester. In 1904, George Sumner was ageing but not fully retired, so a Bishop of Dorking was also appointed early the next year; The appointment of Cecil Boutflower as the only Bishop of Dorking was, functionally, an interruption in the See of Guildford; Boutflower took on suffragan duties in the north of the Diocese. When Boutflower departed for missionary duty in Japan, Sumner was persuaded to resign the See and John Randolph was appointed Bishop of Guildford, succeeding Boutflower in duties and Sumner in the See.

Bishops of Guildford
From	Until	Incumbent	Notes
1874	1879	John Utterton	Died in office on 21 December 1879
1879	1888	See vacant	
1888	1909	George Sumner	Duties given to the Bishop of Dorking, 1905. Resigned the See in early 1909; d. December 1909.
1909	1927	John Randolph	Subsequently became Dean of Salisbury (1928–1935)
