= 1995 Benson & Hedges Cup =

- Administrator: Test and County Cricket Board
- Cricket format: Limited overs cricket (55 overs per innings)
- Champions: Lancashire (3rd title)
- Participants: 22
- Matches: 57
- Most runs: 469 Trevor Ward (Kent)
- Most wickets: 15 Javagal Srinath (Gloucestershire)

The 1995 Benson & Hedges Cup was the twenty-fourth edition of cricket's Benson & Hedges Cup. It was an English limited overs county cricket tournament which was held between 23 April and 15 July 1995.

It had been agreed before the close of the 1994 season that the Benson & Hedges Cup would revert to a zonal system, having been a knockout tournament for the 1993 and 1994 tournaments. Ireland, having entered the tournament for the first time in 1994, retained their place, meaning there were 22 teams.

The competition was won by Lancashire County Cricket Club for a record third time, defeating Kent County Cricket Club by 35 runs in the final at Lord's on 15 July 1995.

== Fixtures and results ==
=== Group stage ===
==== Group A ====
Team	Pld	W	L	NR	A	Pts	NRRA100
Lancashire	5	4	0	1	0	9	22.567
Nottinghamshire	5	3	1	1	0	7	0.704
Warwickshire	5	2	2	1	0	5	4.685
Durham	5	2	2	1	0	5	-3.172
Minor Counties	5	1	3	1	0	3	-11.761
Leicestershire	5	0	4	1	0	1	-7.583

==== Group B ====
Team	Pld	W	L	NR	A	Pts	NRRA100
Yorkshire	4	3	0	0	1	7	17.348
Worcestershire	4	3	1	0	0	6	26.025
Derbyshire	4	2	1	0	1	5	-3.116
Northamptonshire	4	1	3	0	0	2	-1.499
Scotland	4	0	4	0	0	0	-37.356

==== Group C ====
Team	Pld	W	L	NR	A	Pts	NRRA100
Gloucestershire	5	5	0	0	0	10	9.991
Middlesex	5	4	1	0	0	8	7.699
Glamorgan	5	3	2	0	0	6	16.454
Essex	5	1	3	1	0	3	-2.485
Hampshire	5	1	3	1	0	3	-6.099
Combined Universities	5	0	5	0	0	0	-28.048

==== Group D ====
Team	Pld	W	L	NR	A	Pts	NRRA100
Kent	4	4	0	0	0	8	27.137
Somerset	4	2	2	0	0	4	12.172
Surrey	4	2	2	0	0	4	4.665
Sussex	4	2	2	0	0	4	0.460
Ireland	4	0	4	0	0	0	-46.005

=== Quarter-finals ===
30, 31 May 1995
(scorecard)

Gloucestershire; 113 all out (49.4 overs)	v	Somerset; 114/4 (35.1 overs)
Bob Dawson 38; Mushtaq Ahmed 3/23 (10.4 overs)		Marcus Trescothick 52; Javagal Srinath 2/35 (10.1 overs)

Somerset won by 6 wickets
The Royal and Sun Alliance County Ground, Bristol
Umpires: Vanburn Holder & Barrie Leadbeater
Player of the match: Jeremy Batty (Somerset)

- Reserve day used. Somerset were 64/2 at the close of the first day's play.

30 May 1995
(scorecard)

Kent; 250/9 (55 overs)	v	Middlesex; 224 all out (54.4 overs)
Trevor Ward 64; Angus Fraser 4/49 (11 overs)		Jason Pooley 47; Matthew Fleming 3/41 (10.4 overs)

Kent won by 26 runs
St Lawrence Ground, Canterbury
Umpires: Dickie Bird & Mervyn Kitchen
Player of the match: Mark Ealham (Kent)

30 May 1995
(scorecard)

Nottinghamshire; 201/8 (55 overs)	v	Lancashire; 205/4 (49.4 overs)
Chris Lewis 48; Ian Austin 3/45 (11 overs)		Graham Lloyd 72*; Kevin Evans 2/28 (9 overs)

Lancashire won by 6 wickets
Old Trafford, Manchester
Umpires: John Holder & Barrie Meyer
Player of the match: Graham Lloyd (Lancashire)

30 May 1995
(scorecard)

Yorkshire; 88 all out (48.5 overs)	v	Worcestershire; 89/3 (22.5 overs)
David Byas 47; Stuart Lampitt 4/16 (7.5 overs)		Tom Moody 32*; Mark Anderson 2/15 (6 overs)

Worcestershire won by 7 wickets
Headingley Cricket Ground, Leeds
Umpires: John Harris & Ken Palmer
Player of the match: Stuart Lampitt (Worcestershire)

=== Semi-finals ===
13, 14 June 1995
(scorecard)

Kent; 250/9 (55 overs)	v	Somerset; 219/8 (55 overs)
Mark Ealham 52; Mushtaq Ahmed 2/28 (11 overs)		Andy Hayhurst 69*; Tim Wren 3/34 (11 overs)

Kent won by 31 runs
St Lawrence Ground, Canterbury
Umpires: John Holder & George Sharp
Player of the match: Mark Ealham (Kent)

- Reserve day used. Kent were 250/9 (55 overs) at the end of the first day's play.

13 June 1995
(scorecard)

Worcestershire; 261/5 (55 overs)	v	Lancashire; 264/8 (54.2 overs)
Graeme Hick 109; Wasim Akram 3/59 (11 overs)		Wasim Akram 64; Graeme Hick 2/30 (5 overs)

Lancashire won by 2 wickets
New Road, Worcester
Umpires: Roy Palmer & Alan Whitehead
Player of the match: Wasim Akram (Lancashire)

=== Final ===
15 July 1995
(scorecard)

Lancashire; 274/7 (55 overs)	v	Kent; 239 all out (52.1 overs)
Mike Atherton 93; Dean Headley 2/57 (11 overs)		Aravinda de Silva 112; Mike Watkinson 3/42 (10.1 overs); Gary Yates 3/42 (11 overs)

Lancashire won by 35 runs
Lord's, London
Umpires: Nigel Plews & David Shepherd
Player of the match: Aravinda de Silva (Kent)

== See also ==
- Benson & Hedges Cup
