= The Bible Speaks Today =

The Bible Speaks Today is a series of biblical commentaries published by the Inter-Varsity Press. It includes Old and New Testament commentaries as well as books on biblical themes. All the titles begin with "The Message of..."

Tremper Longman notes that the series is "readable, accurate, and relevant." John Stott's volume on Romans was a winner in the 1995 Christianity Today Book Awards.

== Titles ==
=== Old Testament ===
- David J. Atkinson, The Message of Genesis 1–11
- Joyce G. Baldwin, The Message of Genesis 12–50
- J. Alec Motyer, The Message of Exodus
- Derek Tidball, The Message of Leviticus
- Raymond Brown, The Message of Numbers
- Raymond Brown, The Message of Deuteronomy
- David G. Firth, The Message of Joshua
- Michael Wilcock, The Message of Judges
- David J. Atkinson, The Message of Ruth
- Mary J. Evans, The Message of Samuel
- John W. Olley, The Message of Kings
- Michael Wilcock, The Message of Chronicles
- Robert Fyall, The Message of Ezra & Haggai
- Raymond Brown, The Message of Nehemiah
- David G. Firth, The Message of Esther
- David J. Atkinson, The Message of Job
- Michael Wilcock, The Message of Psalms 1-72
- Michael Wilcock, The Message of Psalms 73-150
- David J. Atkinson, The Message of Proverbs
- Derek Kidner, The Message of Ecclesiastes
- Tom Gledhill, The Message of the Song of Songs
- Barry G. Webb, The Message of Isaiah
- Christopher J. H. Wright, The Message of Jeremiah
- Christopher J. H. Wright, The Message of Lamentations
- Christopher J. H. Wright, The Message of Ezekiel
- Dale Ralph Davis, The Message of Daniel
- Derek Kidner, The Message of Hosea
- J. Alec Motyer, The Message of Amos
- Rosemary Nixon, The Message of Jonah
- David Prior, The Message of Joel, Micah & Habakkuk
- Gordon Bridger, The Message of Obadiah, Nahum and Zephaniah
- Barry G. Webb, The Message of Zechariah
- Peter Adam, The Message of Malachi

=== New Testament ===
- John Stott, The Message of the Sermon on the Mount
- Michael Green, The Message of Matthew
- Donald English, The Message of Mark
- Michael Wilcock, The Message of Luke
- Bruce Milne, The Message of John
- John Stott, The Message of Acts
- John Stott, The Message of Romans
- David Prior, The Message of 1 Corinthians
- Paul Barnett, The Message of 2 Corinthians
- John Stott, The Message of Galatians
- John Stott, The Message of Ephesians
- J. Alec Motyer, The Message of Philippians
- Dick Lucas, The Message of Colossians & Philemon
- John Stott, The Message of 1 & 2 Thessalonians
- John Stott, The Message of 1 Timothy & Titus
- John Stott, The Message of 2 Timothy
- Raymond Brown, The Message of Hebrews
- J. Alec Motyer, The Message of James
- Edmund P. Clowney, The Message of 1 Peter
- Dick Lucas and Christopher Green, The Message of 2 Peter & Jude
- David Jackman, The Message of John's Letters
- Michael Wilcock, The Message of Revelation

=== Themes ===
- Ian Payne, The Message of Humanity
- Patrick Mitchel, The Message of Love
- Howard Peskett and Vinoth Ramachandra, The Message of Vision
- Tim Chester, The Message of Prayer
- Philip Graham Ryken, The Message of Salvation
- Trevor J. Burke, The Message of Sonship
- Keith Ferdinando, The Message of Spiritual Warfare
- Chris Green, The Message of the Church
- Derek Tidball, The Message of the Cross
- K Warrington, The Message of the Holy Spirit
- T Desmond Alexander, The Message of the Kingdom of God
- Peter Lewis, The Message of the Living God
- Robert Letham, The Message of the Person of Christ
- Paul Beasley-Murray, The Message of the Resurrection
- Steve Motyer, The Message of the Second Coming
- Brian Edgar, The Message of the Trinity
- Tim Meadowcroft, The Message of the Word of God
- Daniel J Estes, The Message of Wisdom
- Diane Tidball, The Message of Women
- John Risbridger, The Message of Worship
