= Colin Fletcher (bishop) =

British Anglican bishop

The Right Reverend Colin Fletcher
- Bishop of Dorchester
- Diocese: Diocese of Oxford
- In office: 2000–2020
- Predecessor: Anthony Russell
- Successor: Gavin Collins
- Other posts: Chaplain to George Carey, Archbishop of Canterbury (1993–2000); Acting Bishop of Oxford (2006–2007 & 2014–2016)

Orders
- Ordination: 1975 (deacon); 1976 (priest) by Ross Hook
- Consecration: 4 October 2000 by George Carey

Personal details
- Born: 17 November 1950 (age 75)
- Denomination: Anglican
- Spouse: (m. 1980)
- Children: three
- Education: Trinity College, Oxford

Colin William Fletcher (born 17 November 1950) is a British retired Anglican bishop. He served as area Bishop of Dorchester in the Diocese of Oxford.

== Early life and ministry ==
Fletcher was educated at Marlborough College and Trinity College, Oxford, and came to faith through the Iwerne camps as a teenager. After studying at Wycliffe Hall, Oxford he was ordained into the Church of England: he was made a deacon at Michaelmas 1975 (20 September), in Bradford Cathedral and ordained a priest the following Michaelmas (19 September 1976), at Holy Trinity Church, Skipton; both times by Ross Hook, Bishop of Bradford. His ordained ministry began with a curacy at Shipley.

Fletcher was then a tutor at Wycliffe Hall and after that Vicar of Holy Trinity in Margate for eight years, before becoming chaplain to George Carey, Archbishop of Canterbury — a post he held for seven years. During his time as chaplain, he was co-chair of the Lambeth Group, which was set up to advise the British government on the "spiritual aspects of the millennium".

== Episcopal career ==
Fletcher was appointed to the episcopate in 2000, succeeding Anthony Russell on his appointment as Bishop of Ely. He was consecrated as a bishop in Westminster Abbey by George Carey, Archbishop of Canterbury, on 4 October 2000 (St Francis of Assisi's day). Following the retirement of Richard Harries as Bishop of Oxford, Fletcher was Acting Bishop of Oxford until the appointment of John Pritchard (2 June 2006 – 23 March 2007); in 2014 he became acting bishop again following Pritchard's retirement (31 October 2014 – September 2016). Fletcher announced his intention to retire on 4 October 2020.

In retirement, he has been licensed as an honorary assistant bishop of the Diocese of Oxford since 2021.

== Awards ==
Fletcher was awarded the Officer of the Order of the British Empire in the Millennium Honours List. In 2008 he was awarded the Cross of St Augustine, the second highest international award for outstanding service to the Anglican Communion, by Rowan Williams, Archbishop of Canterbury.

== Private life ==
Fletcher is a keen ornithologist. He married in 1980 and has three children.

His brother is Philip Fletcher (1946-2022), a reader and retired public servant.

== Styles ==
- The Reverend Colin Fletcher (1976–1988)
- The Reverend Canon Colin Fletcher (1988–2000)
- The Right Reverend Colin Fletcher (2000–present)
