= Mark Wilson (priest) =

Anglican archdeacon

Mark John Crichton Wilson (born January 1946) was the Archdeacon of Dorking in the Church of England from 1996 to 2005 when he retired.

== Life and ministry ==
Wilson was educated at St Paul's Cathedral School, St John's School, Leatherhead, and Clare College, Cambridge. He was ordained after studies at Ridley Hall, Cambridge, in 1970. After curacies in Luton, Bedfordshire and Ashtead, Surrey, he was the chaplain at Epsom College from 1977 to 1981. He was Vicar of Christ Church, Epsom Common, from then until his appointment as archdeacon in 1996. Since his retirement he has practised as a psychotherapist.

== Notes ==
Church of England titles
Preceded by Christopher William Herbert	Archdeacon of Dorking; 1982–1990	Succeeded by Julian Tudor Henderson
