= Windsor Roberts =

British Archdeacon

Ven. Windsor Roberts (1898–1962) was an Able Seaman towards the end of World War I who later served as parish priest in naval Bristol and parts of the Portsmouth conurbation, particularly during World War II and finally served as Archdeacon of Dorking from 1957 until his death.

== Birth and early life ==
Windsor Roberts was born in Pontnewynydd in Monmouthshire on 4 May 1898, the son of John Wesley Roberts and his wife, Mary Jane Jones. When the census of Wales was taken in 1901 his father was described as an underground labourer living at 49, Hanbury Road there with his wife, four daughters and three-year-old son.

He was educated at West Monmouth School, after which he was briefly employed as a pupil teacher.

He joined the Armed Forces on 29 May 1916, engaging himself to serve three years in the Wales Division, Royal Naval Volunteer Reserve. He was mustered as an Ordinary Seaman aboard HMS Victory VI, shore establishment, Portsmouth, on 6 November 1916, advanced to Able Seaman on 6 February 1917 and transferred to HMS President (shore establishment), London on 1 July 1917, being mustered for duty at Western Rhyl Wireless Telegraphy Station. He was re-mustered as a telegraphist on 10 January 1918.

He joined HMS Teutonic on 1 September 1918, serving on convoy escort and troop transport in the North Atlantic for two months and in merchant duties and manoeuvres after the peace of 11 November 1918 before being discharged to shore on demobilisation on 4 February 1919.

== Professional career ==
The First World War being over and his naval service having ended, Roberts went up to St John's College, Durham, to train for the Anglican ministry, graduating BA in 1922.

He was made a deacon in the Church of England by the Bishop of Bristol, Dr. George Nickson, with a title to St. Paul's, Bedminster, on 17 December 1922. He served as curate there, 1922–1926.

He was ordained priest by the Bishop in Bristol Cathedral on 23 December 1923.

In 1926 he was appointed curate of the Temple Church (“Holy Cross”) in the city of Bristol, then - in 1928 - moved to St. Mary's, Portsea, Portsmouth.

He was successfully nominated by the Vicar of Portsea to the Bishop of Portsmouth for the vacant benefice of St. James's, Milton in Portsmouth in January 1931, and remained as vicar there until 1947. He was appointed as Rector of Alverstoke by Portsmouth Harbour in April 1947.

He served as Surrogate, 1931–1957, and as a Proctor (representative) in Convocation, 1945–1957, in and for that diocese, meanwhile appointed an Honorary Canon of Portsmouth Cathedral in 1947 and serving as Commissary in England for the Bishop of Uganda, the Right Reverend Leslie Wilfrid Brown, 1953–1959, and as Rural Dean of Alverstoke, 1954–1957.

== Archdeacon of Dorking ==
Roberts was recruited to serve as Archdeacon of Dorking by an old friend, Ivor Watkins, the newly appointed Bishop of Guildford, and appointed as such in March 1957.

Having moved to the diocese of Guildford, he was appointed as Rector of Bisley in April 1957. He became an Examining Chaplain to the new Bishop of Guildford, the Right Reverend George Reindorp, in July 1961.

== Death ==
Windsor Roberts died in the Milford Chest Hospital in Milford, Surrey on 23 December 1962. A memorial service was held for him in Guildford Cathedral on 14 January 1963.

Roberts, who never married, was survived by his six sisters: Misses Blodwen, Sarah, Greta, Gladys and Gwen Roberts and Mrs F. Hayward.

== Notes ==
Church of England titles
Preceded by David Goodwin Loveday	Archdeacon of Dorking; 1957–1962	Succeeded by Kenneth Dawson Evans
