= William Purcell (priest) =

William Henry Samuel Purcell (1912-1994) was Archdeacon of Dorking from 1968 until 1982.

== Biography ==
Purcell was born in or near to Norwich on 22 January 1912. Purcell was educated at Norwich School and Fitzwilliam College, Cambridge and ordained in 1938. After a curacy in Headingley, Yorkshire he was raised to the position of a Minor Canon of Ripon Cathedral in that county. He held incumbencies (as priest leading a church) at St Matthew, Chapel Allerton, in Leeds, Yorkshire and Epsom, Surrey before his appointment as Archdeacon which he retired at the age of 70. He lived a further 12 years until 4 June 1994.

== Notes ==
Church of England titles
Preceded by Kenneth Dawson Evans	Archdeacon of Dorking; 1968–1982	Succeeded by Peter Graham Hogben
