= Breadmore =

Breadmore is an English surname. Notable people with the surname include:

- Lauren Breadmore (born 1983), Australian tennis player
- Martin Breadmore (born 1967), British archdeacon
