= Conrad Meyer =

Conrad Meyer may refer to:

- Conrad Meyer (painter) (1618–1689)
- Conrad Ferdinand Meyer (1825–1898), Swiss poet
- Conrad Meyer (bishop) (1922–2011), British religious leader
