= Peter Hogben =

Peter Graham Hogben (5 July 1925 – 26 November 2011) was Archdeacon of Dorking from 1982 until 1990.

== Biography ==
Hogben was educated at The Harvey Grammar School and left school to commence wartime service with the Royal Engineers. When peace returned he worked for two firms of agricultural auctioneers (in Kent and in Hertfordshire).

He was ordained in 1961 and was Curate at St John, Hale, Surrey from 1961 to 1964. He was Vicar of Westborough, Guildford from 1964 to 1971; and Vicar of Ewell before his appointment as Archdeacon from 1982 until his retirement eight year later.

Church of England titles
Preceded by William Purcell	Archdeacon of Dorking; 1982–1990	Succeeded by Christopher Herbert
