= Edward Newill =

Edward Joseph Newill was Archdeacon of Dorking from 1936 to 1954.

== Biography ==
Born at Admaston, Shropshire on 26 January 1877, he was educated at King Edward's School, Birmingham and Hertford College, Oxford; and ordained in 1901. After curacies in Guildford and Norland, West Yorkshire he was Vicar of Witley, Surrey and then Rural Dean of Godalming before his appointment as Archdeacon in 1936. He served and ministered until his death almost 18 years later.

He died in Surrey on 24 July 1954 aged 77.

== Notes ==
Church of England titles
Preceded by Cyril Henry Golding-Bird	Archdeacon of Dorking; 1936–1954	Succeeded by David Goodwin Loveday
