= Admaston, Shropshire =

Village in Shropshire, England

Coordinates: 52.714°N 2.543°W

Admaston
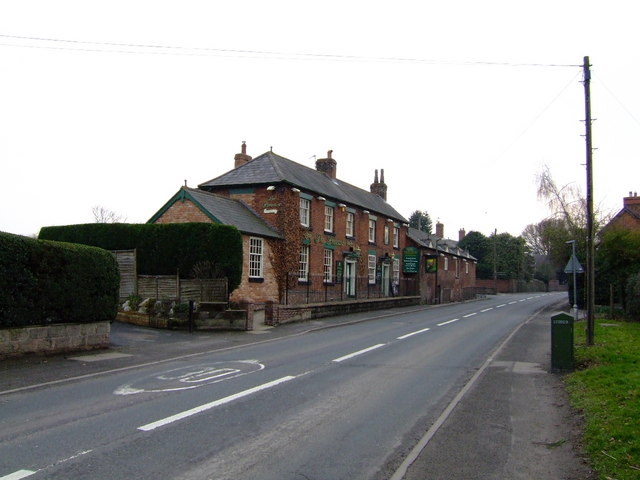
- The Pheasant public house in Admaston

- Admaston shown within Telford in orange

- Location within Shropshire
- OS grid reference: SJ632129
- Civil parish: Wrockwardine
- Unitary authority: Telford and Wrekin
- Ceremonial county: Shropshire
- Region: West Midlands
- Country: England
- Sovereign state: United Kingdom
- Post town: TELFORD
- Postcode district: TF5
- Dialling code: 01952
- Police: West Mercia
- Fire: Shropshire
- Ambulance: West Midlands
- UK Parliament: The Wrekin

Admaston is a village in Wrockwardine civil parish, borough of Telford and Wrekin in Shropshire, England. It lies northwest of Wellington. The village was known for the restorative qualities of its spa water from the mid-18th century through much of the 19th century.

== History ==
The village of Admaston dates to before the time of the Domesday Book, which records the area as being held by Almund and his son Alward, from the Earl of Shrewsbury. The village name derives from Saxon "Eadmund's Tun", translating to "Eadmund's Homestead".

Admaston achieved some level of fame in the 18th century when its natural saline spring was developed into a small spa. The spa building opened in 1750 and had established a hotel by 1805. By this time the waters of Admaston Spa were revered for their restorative qualities but the spa's popularity began to decline from the 1860s and it became a private home. The imposing main building with its distinctive clock house was used as the headquarters of the Admaston Home Guard during the Second World War, after which it was restored and is now once again a private residence.

Until the 1960s, the village was surrounded by predominantly farmland, much of this land was built on to significantly expand the residential development in the area for nearby Telford.

== Services ==
Admaston has a row of shops, including a hairdresser, Post Office, and two small convenience stores. It also has one public house, The Pheasant, a Methodist church and a Newfrontiers church called Hope Community Church Admaston. St Peter's Church at Wrockwardine is Admaston's Church of England parish church.

Local recreational services include two football pitches and a bike park, whilst the new addition of a football and basketball games area has been popular with the local young people. A charity, The Admaston House Community Centre Trust runs the local community centre. Another local charity St Christopher's Hall Trust, has several weekly clubs and activities at the community centre. St Christopher's Hall Trust also organise a week of community events at the end of July called Admaston Fun Week. A holiday club for primary school children runs in the morning and events for families and young people in the evening.

== Notable people ==
Edward Newill, clergyman who became Archdeacon of Dorking, was born at Admaston in 1877.

Former TT road racer William (Bill) Doran lived in Station Road, Admaston, at time of his death in 1973.

Donald Fear, winner of game show Who Wants to be a Millionaire? in 2020, is a resident of Admaston.

== See also ==
- Listed buildings in Wrockwardine
