= Michael Green (theologian) =

British theologian, Anglican priest, Christian apologist and author (1930-2019)

The Reverend Canon Michael Green
- Born: Edward Michael Bankes Green; 20 August 1930
- Died: 6 February 2019 (aged 88)
- Education: Exeter College, Oxford; Queens' College, Cambridge
- Occupations: Anglican cleric and theologian
- Notable work: Evangelism in the Early Church
- Spouse: Rosemary
- Children: 4

Ecclesiastical career
- Church: Church of England

Academic work
- Institutions: St Aldate's, Oxford; Regent College, Vancouver; Holy Trinity, Raleigh, NC; Wycliffe Hall, Oxford
- Main interests: Apologetics and evangelism

Edward Michael Bankes Green (20 August 1930 – 6 February 2019) was a British theologian, Anglican priest, Christian apologist and author of more than 50 books.

== Early life, education and ministry ==
Green's mother was Australian and his father was Welsh. He became a committed Christian through the Iwerne camps ministry of E. J. H. Nash (known as "Bash"). He was educated at Clifton College and Exeter College, Oxford (Bachelor of Arts 1953, Master of Arts 1956) and subsequently at Queens' College, Cambridge (Bachelor of Arts 1957, Master of Arts 1961, Bachelor of Divinity 1966) while preparing for ordained ministry at Ridley Hall. He was admitted to the degree of Doctor of Divinity by the Archbishop of Canterbury (1996) and the University of Toronto (1992). He was ordained deacon in 1957 and priest in 1958.

Green was an assistant curate of Holy Trinity, Eastbourne (1957–60), a tutor at the London College of Divinity (1960–69), Principal of St John's College, Nottingham (1969–75) and Rector of St Aldate's Church, Oxford and chaplain of the Oxford Pastorate (1975–86). He had additionally been an honorary canon of Coventry Cathedral from 1970 to 1978. He then moved to Canada where he was Professor of Evangelism at Regent College, Vancouver from 1987 to 1992. He returned to England to take up the position of advisor to the Archbishop of Canterbury and the Archbishop of York for the Springboard Decade of Evangelism. In 1993 he was appointed one of the Six Preachers of Canterbury Cathedral. Despite having officially retired in 1996, he became a Senior Research Fellow and Head of Evangelism and Apologetics at Wycliffe Hall, Oxford in 1997. He lived in the town of Abingdon near Oxford.

Green was married to Rosemary for 61 years, and they had four children: Tim, Sarah, Jenny, and Jonathan.

== Apologetics and evangelism ==
Green was a prolific writer, with much of his work written for a popular reading audience, although he also contributed to academic studies. Many of his best known books discuss the twin topics of evangelism and apologetics.

One of Green's objectives was to equip lay Christian believers in their grasp of the gospel message and to then have confidence to converse with others about faith matters. These practical objectives are clear in books such as Evangelism, Now and Then and Sharing Your Faith With Friends and Family. At a technical level Green contributed an academic study of the praxis and theory of evangelism in Evangelism in the Early Church. This work explores the development of evangelism through the New Testament texts and from the early Church Fathers. He built on those foundational studies in his advocacy of evangelism at a parish church level, both through his personal ministry and in his book Evangelism Through the Local Church.

Green's apologetic work generally focussed on popular misconceptions and objections held by non-Christians. In books such as You Must Be Joking, World on the Run and Why Bother With Jesus, he dealt with attitudes of religious indifference and scepticism. He also addressed a variety of objections concerning religious hypocrisy and religious pluralism as well as popular questions of doubt and unbelief. He also examined the evidences for the life, death and resurrection of Christ in Man Alive and again in the revision of that book, The Day Death Died.

Green also explored academic challenges to faith, such as in the collection of essays he prepared as a reply to Don Cupitt's work on The Myth of God Incarnate, which were published less than six months later under the title The Truth of God Incarnate. In that analysis Green and his colleagues addressed the problems of myth and history as propounded in modern biblical scholarship, especially concerning the relationship between the events of Jesus' ministry and teaching and the doctrine of the Incarnation.

One of Green's more recent works, The Books the Church Suppressed: Fiction and Truth in The Da Vinci Code, is an argument for orthodox Christianity against Gnosticism as presented in The Da Vinci Code. Green here linked Gnosticism with a decline in society. He also claimed that Gnosticism leads to a decline in morality, so that by ordaining a homosexual bishop the Episcopal Church of the United States has itself shown Gnostic tendencies. He considered aspects of apologetic methodology and strategy in his co-authored work with Alister McGrath.

Aside from his apologetic writings, Green also addressed issues of discipleship in the Christian life, ministry and leadership in the church, the doctrine of baptism, pneumatology (study of the Holy Spirit) and demonology. He also wrote non-technical commentaries on certain books of the New Testament. In 2 Peter Reconsidered he provided a solid exegesis and defended the authenticity of the book; through his interpretation he also showed his Arminianism.

Green led a mission to Winchester College in the 1970s, which was followed by the rapid growth of the school's "Christian Forum", an evangelical group which by 1977 numbered around 100 schoolboys, a sixth of the school's total number. The barrister John Smyth regularly attended and addressed the group; according to the Makin Review, published in 2024, Green was told in 1982 by a curate at Winchester College about Smyth's serial sadomasochistic abuse of boys at the school but, in Green's words, was "sworn to secrecy" (section 12.1.10 (s)).

Adventure of Faith is his spiritual autobiography.

== Works ==
=== Books ===
- Green, Michael (1964). Called to Serve: ministry and ministers in the church. Christian Foundations. Vol. 4. London: Hodder & Stoughton. OCLC 560313475.
- ——— (1967). Man Alive. Pocket books. Leicester: Inter-Varsity. ISBN 9780851103396. OCLC 12173522.
- ——— (1968). Runaway World. London: Inter-Varsity Press. ISBN 9780877846888. OCLC 560313524.
- ——— (1968). 2 Peter Reconsidered. The Tyndale New Testament Lecture, 1960. London: Tyndale Press. ISBN 0851110207.
- ——— (1970). Evangelism in the Early Church. London: Hodder & Stoughton. ISBN 9780340107072. OCLC 103058.
- ——— (1973). New Life, New Lifestyle. London: Hodder & Stoughton. ISBN 9780340355121. OCLC 779105434.
- ——— (1975). I Believe in the Holy Spirit. I believe ... Vol. 1. London: Hodder & Stoughton. ISBN 9780340177679. OCLC 2830638.
- ——— (1976). You Must Be Joking: Popular Excuses for Avoiding Jesus Christ. London: Hodder & Stoughton. ISBN 9780340211267. OCLC 3984467.
- ——— (1979). Evangelism, now and then. London: Inter-Varsity Press. ISBN 9780851104096. OCLC 16498844.
- ——— (1979). Why Bother With Jesus?. Hodder Christian paperbacks. London: Hodder & Stoughton. ISBN 9780340240083. OCLC 8099124.
- ———; Holloway, David; Watson, David C. K. (1980). Church and Homosexuality: a positive answer to current questions. London: Hodder & Stoughton. ISBN 9780340254837. OCLC 59143579.
- ——— (1981). I Believe in Satan's Downfall. I believe ... London: Hodder & Stoughton. ISBN 9780340265680. OCLC 16562413.
- ——— (1982). The Day Death Died: did Jesus Christ really rise from the dead?. London: Inter-Varsity Press. ISBN 9780851104386. OCLC 60045196.
- ——— (1982). To Corinth with Love: the vital relevance today of Pauls's advice to the Corinthian church. London: Hodder & Stoughton. ISBN 9780849931109. OCLC 859945404.
- ——— (1982). The Second Epistle of Peter and the Epistle of Jude. Tyndale New Testament Commentaries. Grand Rapids, MI: Eerdmans. ISBN 9780802822680. OCLC 855192293.
- ——— (1983). Freed to Serve: training & equipping for ministry. Hodder Christian paperbacks. London: Hodder & Stoughton. ISBN 9780340281956. OCLC 9663756.
- ——— (1983). World on the Run. Leicester: Inter-Varsity. ISBN 9780851104355. OCLC 12461594.
- ——— (1984). The Empty Cross of Jesus. Jesus library. Downers Grove, IL: InterVarsity Press. ISBN 9780877849308. OCLC 11235761.
- ——— (1987). Baptism. London: Hodder & Stoughton. ISBN 9780340410561. OCLC 16093252.
- ——— (1989). Was Jesus who he said he was?. Ann Arbor, MI: Servant Publications. ISBN 9780892836246. OCLC 19269764.
- ——— (1990). Evangelism Through the Local Church. London: Hodder & Stoughton. ISBN 9780340529164. OCLC 476403012.
- ——— (1990). Who Is This Jesus?. London: Hodder & Stoughton. ISBN 9780340546109. OCLC 857996568.
- ——— (1991). My God. Guildford, UK: Eagle. ISBN 9780863470417. OCLC 30158006.
- ——— (1993). The Dawn of the New Age. London: Daybreak. ISBN 9780232519808. OCLC 28255931.
- ———; McGrath, Alister (1993). Springboard for Faith. London: Hodder & Stoughton. ISBN 9780340601303. OCLC 29634710.
- ———; Stevens, R. Paul (1994). New Testament Spirituality: true discipleship and spiritual maturity. Guildford, UK: Eagle Publishing. ISBN 9780863471131. OCLC 1029107313.
- ——— (1998). After Alpha. Eastbourne, UK: Kingsway Publications. ISBN 9780854767779. OCLC 935843070.
- ——— (2001). The Message of Matthew: The Kingdom of Heaven. Bible Speaks Today Series. Leicester, UK: Inter-Varsity Press. ISBN 9780851115368. OCLC 1064106938.
- ——— (2002). But Don't All Religions Lead to God?: Navigating the Multi-Faith Maze. Leicester, UK: Inter-Varsity Press. ISBN 9780851112817. OCLC 50936332.
- ——— (2004). Thirty Years That Changed the World: The Book of Acts for Today. Grand Rapids, MI: Eerdmans. ISBN 9780802827661. OCLC 727069164.
- ——— (2004). St. Thomas Becket. Leominster, UK: Gracewing. ISBN 9780852445907. OCLC 60416898.
- ——— (2005). Avoiding Jesus: Answers for Skeptics, Cynics, and the Curious. Grand Rapids, MI: Baker Books. ISBN 9780801065613. OCLC 57965803.
- ——— (2005). Sharing Your Faith With Friends and Family. Grand Rapids, MI: Baker Books. ISBN 978-0-80106-525-5. OCLC 56904346.
- ——— (2005). The Books the Church Suppressed: fiction and truth in The Da Vinci code. Oxford, UK: Monarch Books. ISBN 9781854246981. OCLC 62890855.
- ——— (2009). Lies, Lies, Lies!: exposing myths about the real Jesus. Nottingham: Inter-Varsity Press. ISBN 9781844743919. OCLC 368052166.
- ——— (2011). Compelled by Joy: a lifelong passion for evangelism. Nottingham: Inter-Varsity Press. ISBN 9781844745425. OCLC 756593624.
- ——— (2013). Jesus for Sceptics. Nottingham: Inter-Varsity Press. ISBN 978-0-95722-123-9.
- ——— (2018). 30 Days with Jesus. Bath, UK: Bible Trust. ISBN 978-1-78690-382-2.

=== Edited by ===
- ———, ed. (1977). The Truth of God Incarnate. Hodder Christian paperbacks. London: Hodder & Stoughton. ISBN 9780340225752. OCLC 925338799. Grand Rapids, Mich.: Eerdmans, 1977 ISBN 9780802817266 OLCC 3292512

=== Chapters ===
- ——— (1977). "Jesus in the New Testament". In ——— (ed.). The Truth of God Incarnate. Hodder Christian paperbacks. London: Hodder & Stoughton. pp. 36–42. ISBN 9780340225752. OCLC 925338799.
- ——— (1977). "Jesus and historical scepticism". In ——— (ed.). The Truth of God Incarnate. Hodder Christian paperbacks. London: Hodder & Stoughton. pp. 115–. ISBN 9780340225752. OCLC 925338799.

== Autobiography ==
- Adventure of Faith: Reflections on 50 Years of Christian Service, Zondervan, Grand Rapids, 2001 ISBN 0-00-710542-8
