= Joyce Baldwin =

British biblical scholar (1921–1995)

- Born: 1 August 1921
- Died: 30 December 1995 (aged 74)
- Occupations: Theologian, author

Joyce G. Baldwin (1 August 1921 – 30 December 1995) was a British evangelical biblical scholar and theological educator who became one of the leading women in the field of biblical scholarship in her day. At a time when the Church of England did not ordain women to any of its orders (deacon, priest or bishop), she championed the cause of women's ministry through influential writing, teaching and practical example.

== Biography ==
Joyce Baldwin was born in Essex, but her family later moved to Nottingham. She studied at Mundella Grammar School and the University of Nottingham. Baldwin began her professional career as a teacher of modern languages in Lancashire, England. In 1947 she trained for ministry with the China Inland Mission, gaining a diploma in theology from the University of London whilst studying for missionary service at the recently formed London Bible College. In 1949, she travelled to China, joining the CIM language school in Chongqing. Her missionary service was curtailed by communist restrictions, which forced CIM to withdraw its overseas missionaries. She left China in 1951, seriously ill with dysentery. This illness led to her being unable to recommence missionary service again. Instead, she became a lecturer at Dalton House in Bristol (a training college for women missionaries and Anglican parish workers), which led to her lifelong career as a teacher of Old Testament, along with Philosophy and Ethics. She swiftly attained her degree in divinity, eventually becoming Vice-Principal and then Principal of Dalton House.

In 1971, Dalton House amalgamated with the two men's Anglican colleges in Bristol, Clifton Theological College and Tyndale Hall, to form Trinity College, Bristol. Joyce Baldwin became Dean of Women of the newly formed college, working alongside Alec Motyer, as Principal and J.I. Packer, as Vice-Principal.

When Alec Motyer left in 1981 to return to parish ministry, George Carey was appointed to succeed him. However, Carey postponed taking up his new office for a year, in order to prepare his parish, St Nicholas, Durham, for the forthcoming vacancy. Joyce Baldwin was appointed Principal for a fixed-term to cover the intervening year until her own retirement.

Joyce Baldwin was author of a number of commentaries on Old Testament books, including Daniel and Esther. She also spoke and wrote in favour of the ordination of women.

In 1983, she married Jack Caine, a friend whom she had known as a teenager, following the rekindling of their friendship shortly before her retirement. She was ordained deacon following the Church of England's decision to admit women to that order in 1987. However, when the decision was made to admit women to the priesthood, she declined to be further ordained, feeling that her life's calling had already been fulfilled.

Tremper Longman describes her as a "balanced and sane exegete".

== Selected works ==
- Haggai, Zechariah and Malachi (1972) IVP (Tyndale Old Testament Commentaries) ISBN 0-851-11825-9
- Women Likewise (1973) Church Pastoral Aid Society ISBN 0-854-91113-8
- Daniel (1978) IVP (Tyndale Old Testament Commentaries) ISBN 0-851-11832-1
- Lamentations - Daniel (1984) Scripture Union ISBN 0-875-08162-2
- Esther (1985) IVP (Tyndale Old Testament Commentaries) ISBN 0-851-11840-2
- The message of Genesis 12-50 : from Abraham to Joseph (1986) IVP (The Bible Speaks Today Series) ISBN 0-851-10759-1
- 1 and 2 Samuel (1988) IVP (Tyndale Old Testament Commentaries) ISBN 0-851-11640-X
