= Diocese of Guildford =

Diocese of the Church of England

Coordinates: 51.2411°N 0.5900°W

Diocese of Guildford Dioecesis Guildfordiensis
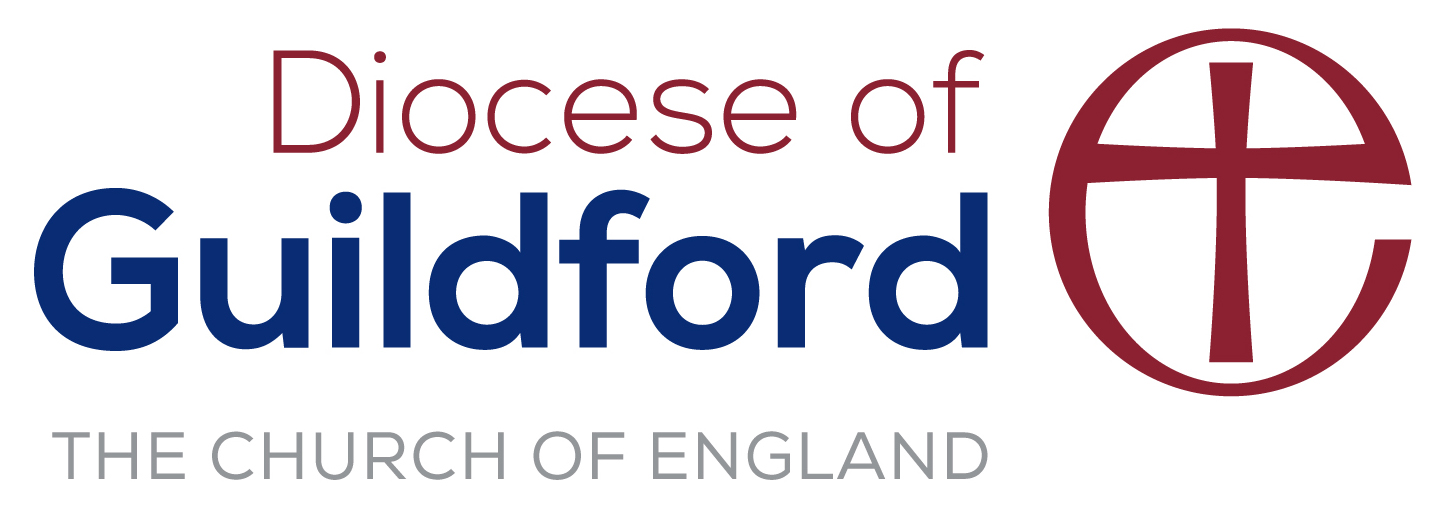

- Coat of arms

- Flag

Location
- Ecclesiastical province: Canterbury
- Archdeaconries: Dorking; Surrey

Statistics
- Parishes: 160
- Churches: 217

Information
- Cathedral: Guildford Cathedral
- Language: English

Current leadership
- Bishop: Bishop of Guildford (vacant; acting: the Bishop of Dorking)
- Suffragan: Paul Davies, Bishop of Dorking
- Archdeacons: Martin Breadmore, Archdeacon of Dorking; Catharine Mabuza, Archdeacon of Surrey

Website
- cofeguildford.org.uk

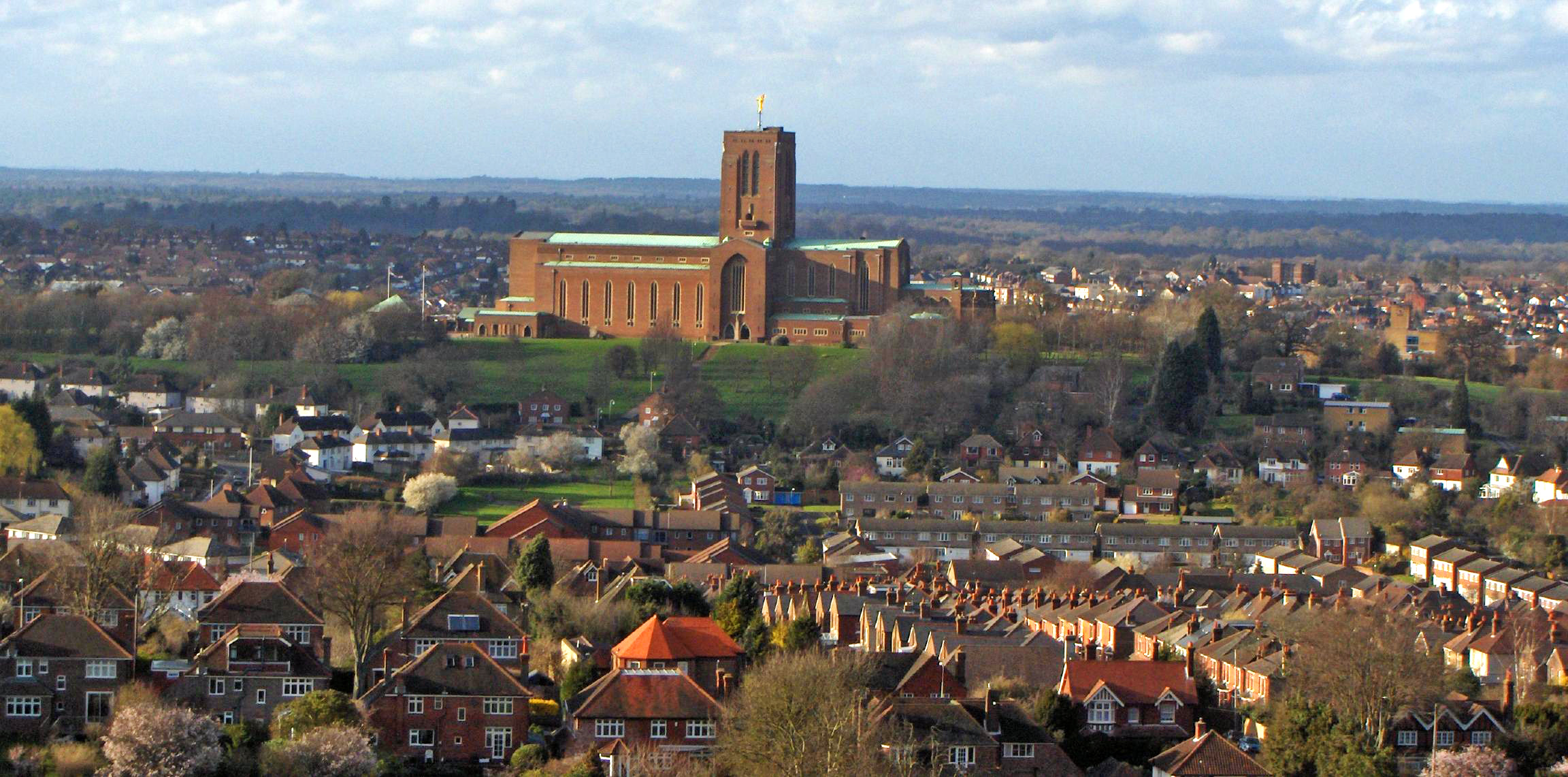
Guildford Cathedral

The Diocese of Guildford is a Church of England diocese covering eight and half of the eleven districts in Surrey, much of north-east Hampshire and a parish in Greater London. The cathedral is Guildford Cathedral and the bishop is the Bishop of Guildford. Of the two provinces of the church, it is in the Province of Canterbury.

== History ==
The diocese was formed on 1 May 1927 from part of the Diocese of Winchester.

== Organisation ==
Of the eleven secular districts of Surrey, eight and a half are in the diocese. The excluded parts are: Spelthorne, part of the Diocese of London; Tandridge; and the Redhill and Reigate half of Reigate and Banstead both in the Diocese of Southwark.

Rushmoor district in Hampshire and the eastern belt of Hart District are in the diocese, the belt being three-church Fleet, Crookham (comprising Church Crookham & Crookham Village), Cove, Minley, Hawley (which includes Blackwater) and Crondall & Ewshot church parishes.

Part of Rowledge church parish is in East Hampshire district rather than Surrey. Chessington (in Greater London) is in the diocese.

=== Bishops ===
The diocesan Bishop of Guildford is assisted by the Bishop suffragan of Dorking. The suffragan see of Dorking was re-created in 1968, having briefly existed in the Diocese of Winchester from 1905 to 1909. The diocese usually operates an informal area scheme in which the diocesan bishop mostly oversees Surrey archdeaconry and the suffragan Dorking, dividing the episcopal workload between the western and eastern parts of the diocese respectively, and each to work with an archdeacon as well as the administrative staff. Alternative episcopal oversight (for parishes in the diocese which reject the ministry of priests who are women) is provided by the provincial episcopal visitor, Norman Banks, Bishop suffragan of Richborough, who is licensed as an honorary assistant bishop of the diocese in order to facilitate his work there.

There are also two former bishops living in the diocese who are licensed as honorary assistant bishops:

- 2006–present: Michael Baughen, retired Bishop of Chester, lives in Godalming.
- 2009–present: Christopher Herbert, retired diocesan Bishop of St Albans, lives in Wrecclesham and is also licensed in Winchester and Chichester dioceses.

=== Archdeaconries ===
- Archdeaconry of Surrey (established 12th century) – Archdeacon of Surrey: Catharine Mabuza; generally overseen by the diocesan Bishop of Guildford
  - includes Deaneries of Aldershot, Cranleigh, Farnham, Godalming, Guildford and Surrey Heath
- Archdeaconry of Dorking (established 1928) – Archdeacon of Dorking: Martin Breadmore; generally overseen by the Bishop suffragan of Dorking
  - includes Deaneries of Dorking, Emly, Epsom, Leatherhead, Runnymede, Woking
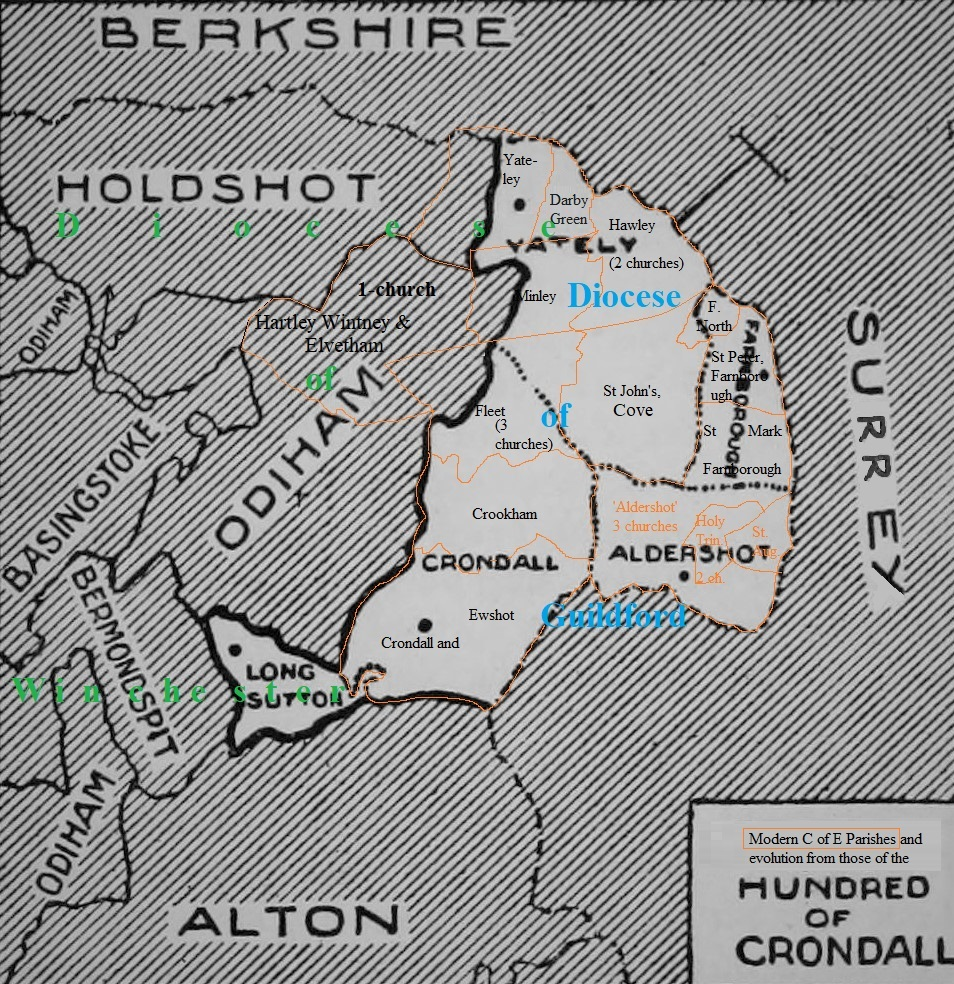
In the far west of the diocese is a church-rich zone from Aldershot to Minley that has chiefly evolved from four original church parishes (bold). The diocese takes in three of those, still under the same parish names yet today reduced in size due to subdivision, nine of ten additional later church parishes shown; each with one core church and also (at present) six supplemental C of E churches.

== Publications and work ==
=== Charitable work ===
Around 90 Church schools are financially linked to the Diocese of Guildford, including two Secondary schools.

The Bishop of Guildford's Foundation supports faith-linked projects and groups that respond to local needs and help build stronger communities. It expresses a sense of communal solidarity with people in need and provides a mechanism for wealthier parishes and church members to channel support to needier groups. Grants are made to a wide variety of causes, including charities working with people who have disabilities, family support projects, youth and children's workers, organisations developing employment for vulnerable people, community organisations, projects for the homeless, school healthy breakfast clubs restricted to the most disadvantaged or troubled families, the Guildford Street Angels team, a less mobile elderly group in Box Hill, and play activities and facilities for children in two of the neediest housing estates.

=== Special ministries ===
Typically non-parochial ministry in the working hours of local priests, chaplains are appointed to 14 schools, to 10 further education colleges/universities, 23 hospitals and homes, the four prisons, Guildford and Woking town centres, Community of St Peter and Acorn Christian foundation, to the Ambulance Service. The diocese subsidises a BSL qualified Chaplain Among Deaf People.

== Bibliography ==
- Church of England Statistics 2002
