= John Taylor (bishop of St Albans) =

British bishop and theologian

- Bishop of St Albans
- Diocese: Diocese of St Albans
- In office: 1980–1995
- Predecessor: Robert Runcie
- Successor: Christopher Herbert
- Other posts: Honorary assistant bishop in Ely (1995–2016) and in Europe (1997–2016); Lord High Almoner (1988–1997)

Orders
- Ordination: 1956 (priest)
- Consecration: 1 May 1980

Personal details
- Born: 6 May 1929
- Died: 1 June 2016 (aged 87)
- Denomination: Anglican
- Parents: George & Gwendoline
- Spouse: Linda Barnes (m. 1956)
- Children: 1 son; 2 daughters
- Profession: Academic & writer (theologian)
- Education: Christ's College, Cambridge; Jesus College & Ridley Hall

John Bernard Taylor (6 May 1929 – 1 June 2016) was a British bishop and theologian who served as Bishop of St Albans.

== Education ==
Taylor was educated at Watford Grammar School for Boys and Christ's College, Cambridge (graduating Bachelor of Arts with first class honours {BA Hons} in Classics), and trained for the ministry at Ridley Hall and Jesus College, Cambridge (as Lady Kay scholar); he proceeded Cambridge Master of Arts (MA Cantab).

== Priestly ministry ==
He was made deacon (presumably c. Michaelmas 1956 at Southwark), and ordained priest at Michaelmas 1957 (22 September), by Bertram Simpson, Bishop of Southwark, at Southwark Cathedral. After a curacy at St Lawrence Church, Morden, he served as Vicar of Henham and Elsenham from 1959 to 1964. During that time he was appointed an examining chaplain to John Tiarks (and later John Trillo), Bishop of Chelmsford in 1962, continuing until 1980.

He was Vice-Principal of Oak Hill Theological College from 1964 to 1972. He was appointed Vicar of All Saints', Woodford Wells and Diocesan Director of Ordinands in 1972; he departed Woodford (but remained DDO) in 1975 to become Archdeacon of West Ham.

== Episcopal ministry ==
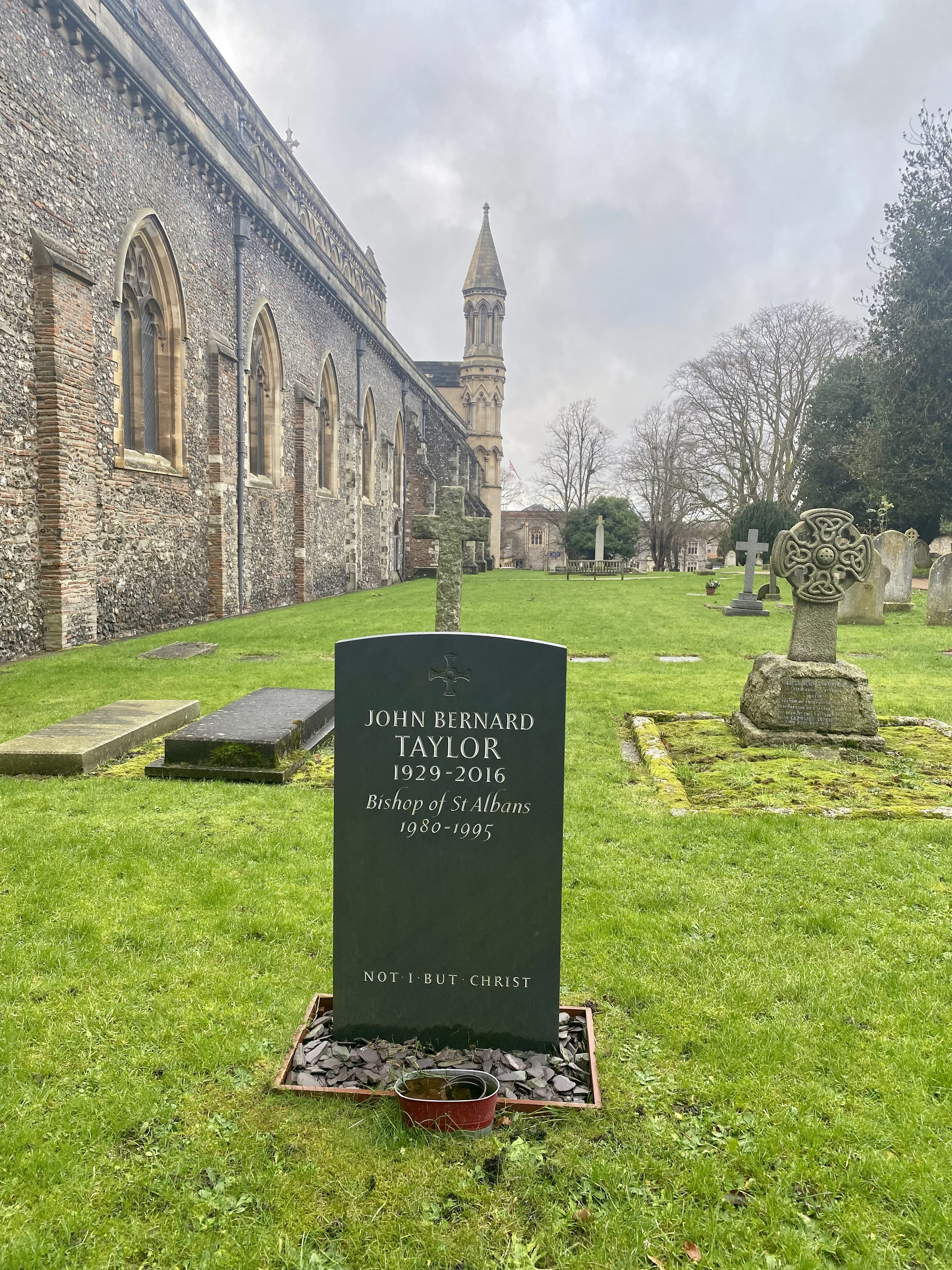
Taylor's grave in the grounds of St Albans Cathedral in 2021

In 1980, Taylor was chosen to succeed Robert Runcie (the new Archbishop of Canterbury) as Bishop of St Albans; he was consecrated a bishop on 1 May, by Runcie, at Westminster Abbey). He was enthroned at St Albans Abbey on 14 June 1980, took his seat (as a Lord Spiritual) in the House of Lords in 1985 and retired in August 1995; his successor was Christopher Herbert. Taylor succeeded David Say, Bishop of Rochester as Lord High Almoner in 1988 and stepped down in 1997: his successor in that post was Nigel McCulloch, Bishop of Wakefield. He retired to Cambridge, where he served as an honorary assistant bishop in the Diocese of Ely until his death; he was also licensed to the same role in the Diocese in Europe from 1997 onwards.

== Other work ==
Taylor authored a number of religious books. He became a Knight Commander of the Royal Victorian Order (KCVO) in 1997.

=== Books ===
- Taylor, John B. (1966). Prime, Derek (ed.). A Christian's Guide to the Old Testament. The Christian's Guide Series. Vol. 10. London: Hodder & Stoughton.
- ——— (1967). Evangelism Among Children and Young People. London: Scripture Union. OCLC 9518176.
- ——— (1969). Ezekiel: An introduction and commentary. Tyndale Old Testament Commentaries. Vol. 26. London: Tyndale Press. OCLC 915290814.
- ——— (1970). The Minor Prophets. Bible Study Books. Grand Rapids, MI: Eerdmans. OCLC 97379.
- ——— (1978). Understanding the Old Testament. Bible Study Books. London: Scripture Union. ISBN 978-0-854-21638-3. OCLC 85083690. — republishing of The Minor Prophets
- ——— (1983). Preaching through the Prophets. London; St Louis, MO: Mowbray Publishing; CBP Press. ISBN 978-0-264-66554-2. OCLC 900943658.
- ——— (1983). Thinking about Islam. World Religions. Guildford, Surrey: Lutterworth Educational. ISBN 978-0-718-82583-6. OCLC 47982418.
- ——— (1989). Going On: guidelines for the newly confirmed. London: Daybreak. ISBN 978-0-232-51859-7. OCLC 20420052.
- ——— (1994). Preaching on God's Justice. Mowbray Preaching Series. London: Mowbray Publishing. ISBN 978-0-264-67338-7. OCLC 31739180.
- ——— (2009). Ezekiel. Tyndale Old Testament Commentaries. Vol. 26 (Reissue ed.). Leicester: Inter-Varsity Press. ISBN 978-1-844-74336-0. — recent edition of Ezekiel: An introduction and commentary

=== Articles ===
- ——— (1995). "William Tyndale: Bible Translator". Anvil. 12 (1): 35–43.
- ——— (1998). "And He Shall Purify: an Exposition of Malachi Chapters Two and Three". Anvil. 15 (1): 6–12.
- ——— (1997). "Purple Reflections: Life as an Evangelical Bishop". Anvil. 14 (3): 183–88.
