= Philip Fletcher =

British public servant (1946–2022)

Philip John Fletcher, CBE (2 May 1946 – 10 February 2022) was a British public servant.

== Career ==
From 1968 to 1995, he was a career civil servant, mainly working in the Department of the Environment and rising to the rank of deputy secretary. He served as the final Receiver of the Metropolitan Police (1996 to 2000); and then led Ofwat as its Director General (1 August 2000 to 31 March 2006) and as Chairman (1 April 2006 to 2012).

== Personal life and death ==
Fletcher was an Anglican Christian, and served as a Reader (lay minister) in the Church of England. He was a member of the Archbishops' Council from 2007 to 2016. His brother is Colin Fletcher, the former bishop of Dorchester.

He was appointed Commander of the Order of the British Empire (CBE) in the 2006 New Year Honours for services to Ofwat. Fletcher died on 10 February 2022, at the age of 75.
