= Derek Kidner =

British Old Testament scholar

Frank Derek Kidner
- Born: 22 September 1913; London, England
- Died: 27 November 2008 (aged 95); Histon, Cambridgeshire, England
- Education: Royal College of Music, Ridley Hall, Cambridge, Christ's College, Cambridge
- Occupation: Warden of Tyndale House
- Notable work: Genesis: an introduction and commentary (1967)
- Religion: Christian
- Theological work
- Era: Mid 20th Century
- Language: English
- Main interests: Old Testament studies

Frank Derek Kidner (22 September 1913 – 27 November 2008) was a British Old Testament scholar, best known for writing commentaries.

== Life ==
Kidner studied piano at the Royal College of Music, before preparing for Anglican ministry at Ridley Hall, Cambridge and Christ's College, Cambridge. While at Cambridge, he continued his interest in music through performances with the Cambridge University Musical Society.

His first role in the Church of England was as Curate of St Nicholas Church, Sevenoaks. He then served as the vicar of Holy Cross Church, Felsted. Kidner then taught at Oak Hill Theological College for thirteen years, before becoming Warden of Tyndale House in 1964. In the same year, he published his first Bible commentary, on the Book of Proverbs, in the Tyndale Old Testament Commentaries series. He was chairman of the editorial committee which compiled Christian Praise, a hymn book "for use by Churches, Schools [and] Youth Fellowships" published by The Tyndale Press in 1957.

Kidner retired from his post at Tyndale House in 1978 and moved to Histon where he spent the last 30 years of his life. He continued writing commentaries, concluding with The Message of Jeremiah in 1987.

== Works ==
Kidner wrote commentaries on the books of Genesis, Ezra–Nehemiah, Psalms, Proverbs, Ecclesiastes, Jeremiah, and Hosea, the most popular of which were published in the Tyndale Old Testament Commentaries and The Bible Speaks Today series. When Inter-Varsity Press replaced some of the volumes in these series due to their age, Kidner's original commentaries were republished as part of a new Kidner Classic Commentaries series.

== Bibliography ==
- The Proverbs: an introduction and commentary. TOTC. Leicester & Downers Grove: InterVarsity Press. 1964.
- Genesis: an introduction and commentary. TOTC. Leicester & Downers Grove: InterVarsity Press. 1967.
- Psalms 1-72: an introduction and commentary on Books I and II of the Psalms. TOTC. Leicester & Downers Grove: InterVarsity Press. 1973.
- Psalms 73-150: a commentary on Books III-V of the Psalms. TOTC. Leicester & Downers Grove: InterVarsity Press. 1975. ISBN 9780877842651.
- Ezra and Nehemiah: an introduction and commentary. TOTC. Leicester & Downers Grove: InterVarsity Press. 1979.
- Love to the Loveless: the Message of Hosea. Downers Grove: InterVarsity Press. 1981.
- The Wisdom of Proverbs, Job, and Ecclesiastes: an Introduction to Wisdom Literature. Downers Grove: InterVarsity Press. 1985.
- The Message of Jeremiah: Against Wind and Tide. Leicester & Downers Grove: InterVarsity Press. 1987.
- A Time to Mourn, and a Time to Dance: Ecclesiastes & the Way of the World. Downers Grove: InterVarsity Press. 1976.
- The Message of Ecclesiastes: a Time to Mourn, and a Time to Dance. Downers Grove: InterVarsity Press. 1976.
