= Alex Cornish =

- Origin: Edinburgh, Scotland
- Genres: Alternative rock, indie rock
- Years active: 2008–present
- Label: Bellevue Records
- Website: www.alexcornishmusic.com

Alex Cornish is an Edinburgh-based singer-songwriter. He was educated at The Harvey Grammar School, Folkestone.

His debut album, Until the Traffic Stops, was released in 2008 on Bellevue Records and was co-produced by Stuart Wilson. Later in 2008, the album was remixed with much of it re-recorded, this time with Cornish working on his own. The album re-released at the end of April 2009. Cornish wrote, sang and performed all the tracks on the album, in his home studio in Edinburgh. with Simon Berriman (drums) and Bevis Hungate (piano) contributing. They also form part of Cornish's live band. Cornish has been played on BBC Radio 1, BBC Radio 2, BBC 6 Music and XFM Scotland. He was the Sunday Times hottest download of the week. One of his tracks, "I'm on the Right Side", was used as the play out track to the film Solstice. Cornish spent 2009 touring and supported Alison Moyet throughout November and December 2009. His second album Call Back was released on 27 September 2010. The album was recorded in Cornish's home studio and also at Watercolour Studios in the Highlands of Scotland. In May 2010 he performed in session for BBC Radio 2 alongside Ellie Goulding. The cover version of "Brothers in Arms" performed in that session was included on the Saturday Sessions CD which was released on Sony in October 2010. In 2010, Cornish toured through various Cafe Neros in the UK sponsored by the Nokia Music Store. He also supported Amy Macdonald. Cornish has also supported, amongst others, Tom McRae, and Starsailor. Cornish's third album No Shore was released in June 2011, described by The Sunday Times as 'a beautiful album'.

In 2013, Cornish toured all over the UK with Mercury Music Prize nominated Kathryn Williams. He also played piano in Williams' band. In 2014, Cornish toured the UK with his own band and also supported Alison Moyet on various dates including The Royal Albert Hall in London. Cornish's fourth album, Beyond the Serenade, was released in May 2015. In January 2015, Cornish was live in session with Dermot O'Leary on BBC Radio 2 alongside Idlewild. Cornish's music has featured in many US TV shows including Showtime's The Big C and ABC's Private Practice.

In 2023 Cornish appeared on the BBC Quay Sessions – his second appearance – with his regular musicians Bevis Hungate and Paul Gilbody and a string quartet. In 2024 he released two albums, the first (Henry Found the Time) mixed by Paul Savage at Chem 19 and the second mixed at his own studio (Squall Critical).

In addition to writing songs, Cornish has also arranged and played strings for various artists as well as writing music for TV. Credits include Wainwright Walks for the BBC and the strings and brass arrangements for the band Morcheeba.

== Discography ==
- Until the Traffic Stops (2009)
- Call Back (2010)
- No Shore (2011)
- Beyond the Serenade (2014)
- Hang on the Word (2017)
- So Long to Looking In (2020)
- We Don't Know What You're Thinking (2022)
- Henry Found the Time (2024)
- Squall Critical (2024)
- One Step Forward (2026)
