= Vicar general =

Principal administrative deputy of the bishop of a diocese

A vicar general (previously, archdeacon) is the principal deputy of the bishop or archbishop of a diocese or an archdiocese for the exercise of administrative authority and possesses the title of local ordinary. As vicar of the bishop, the vicar general exercises the bishop's ordinary executive power over the entire diocese and, thus, is the highest official in a diocese or other particular church after the diocesan bishop or his equivalent in canon law.

The title normally occurs only in Western Christian churches, such as the Latin Church of the Catholic Church and the Anglican Communion. Among the Eastern churches, the Mar Thoma Syrian Church, based in Kerala, India, uses this title and remains an exception. The titles for the equivalent officer in the Eastern churches are syncellus and protosyncellus. The term is also used within some religious orders.

== Ecclesiastical organisation ==
=== Catholic Church ===
In the Catholic Church, a diocesan bishop or archbishop must appoint at least one vicar general for his diocese or archdiocese, but may appoint more than one. The Second Vatican Council referred to the office of vicar general as "the most important office in the diocesan curia".

The vicar general, by virtue of office, is the bishop's agent in administration, acting as second-in-command for diocesan executive matters. (A priest in a separate office, the judicial vicar, serves a similar role with regard to the exercise of ordinary judicial power of governance in the diocese, which is normally exercised in ecclesiastical courts.) Vicars general must be priests, auxiliary bishops, or coadjutor bishops. If a coadjutor bishop exists for a diocese, the diocesan bishop or archbishop is to appoint him as a vicar general. Other auxiliary bishops are usually appointed vicars general or at least episcopal vicars. A vicar general is a local ordinary and, as such, acquires his powers by virtue of office and not by delegation. He is to possess a doctorate or at least a licentiate in canon law (JCL, JCD) or theology (STL, STD) or be truly expert in these fields. Dioceses whose territory is split into different states usually have one each.

The similarly titled episcopal vicar shares in the bishop's ordinary executive power like the vicar general, except that the episcopal vicar's authority normally extends over only a particular geographic section of a diocese or over certain specific matters. These might include issues concerning religious institutes, education, matrimonial matters, or the faithful of a different rite. These, too, must be priests or auxiliary bishops.

The equivalent officer in the Eastern Catholic Churches is called the syncellus.

Priests appointed as vicars general or episcopal vicars are freely appointed or removed by the diocesan bishop or archbishop, and are appointed for a fixed duration. They lose their office when the term expires, or when the episcopal see falls vacant (sede vacante). Auxiliary bishops may also be removed from the office of vicar general, but must at least be appointed episcopal vicar. An auxiliary bishop who is an episcopal vicar, or a coadjutor bishop who is vicar general, may only be removed from office for a grave reason. Likewise, while they lose their vicar general or episcopal vicar office title sede vacante, they retain the duties and responsibilities of the office—specifically, they can still be exercised while the see is vacant serving as right-hand to the diocesan or apostolic administrator to establish continuity—until the succeeding bishop is installed or assumes office on a diocese. A coadjutor bishop has the right of succession, so if the see falls vacant, he becomes the diocesan bishop or archbishop immediately. These offices should not be confused with the vicar forane or "dean/archpriest", as such vicars do not have ordinary executive power.

The appointment of a vicar general is also a useful tool for a diocesan bishop or archbishop who has additional functions attached to his episcopate. The most notable example is in the diocese of Rome. The Pope is 'ex officio' the diocesan bishop of Rome, but spends most of his time governing the Latin Church and the global Catholic Church. His vicar general therefore functions as the de facto bishop of the diocese. The Vicar General of Rome also serves the same role for the suburbicarian diocese of Ostia, the traditional see of the Dean of the College of Cardinals, ever since it was merged with the diocese of Rome. The Vicar General of Rome, who is normally a cardinal, known as the Cardinal Vicar, is one of the few church officials in Rome to remain in office sede vacante. The current Vicar General of Rome is Cardinal Baldassare Reina.

A similar example is found in the United States, where the archbishop of New York also functioned as ordinary of the military services from World War I until the 1980s: in addition to being responsible for the archdiocese of New York, the same archbishop was also responsible for the Military Ordinariate. This had the status of an apostolic vicariate, and functioned as the equivalent of a diocese defined by quality (that is, all Catholic members of the U.S. military and their dependents) rather than by geography. The archbishop had two separate administrations, therefore, and two sets of vicars general to manage each. This arrangement ended with the establishment of the wholly separate Archdiocese for the Military Services, USA.

In some male religious orders, the title designates a person with authority in the Order after its superior general, for example the Mill Hill Missionaries have a Vicar General with responsibility for the missionaries' work in Europe and North America.

Generic coat of arms of a vicar general

=== Anglican Communion ===
Vicars-General retain important administrative and judicial functions in the Church of England.

Following the Act of Supremacy of 1534, Henry VIII appointed Thomas Cromwell as his vicar general, a delegation of the powers with which Henry was invested by the Act as a result of becoming supreme head of the Church of England.

During the COVID-19 pandemic, the Church of England licensed bishop-designates as episcopal vicars until they were permitted to hold consecration services. For example, Gavin Collins was licensed as an episcopal vicar in the Diocese of Oxford from his earlier-planned consecration date (28 January 2021) until his consecration as Bishop of Dorchester (14 April 2021).

== See also ==
- Appointment of Catholic bishops
