= Toby Booth =

English rugby union coach

Toby Booth (born 6 February 1970) is an English rugby union coach, most recently head coach at Ospreys in the United Rugby Championship. He was educated at The Harvey Grammar School, Folkestone, a prominent football-playing school.

He became a qualified electrician, before attending St. Mary's University College, Strawberry Hill (1994–97), where he studied Sports Science. He later worked as a lecturer there whilst completing his MSc.

== Coaching career ==
Booth joined London Irish in 2002 as assistant academy manager where he helped recruit the first players for the academy – many of whom went on to play for the Exiles' and Bath's first teams. After coming through the ranks at the academy he was appointed head coach at London Irish in 2008 after the previous coach, Brian Smith, became an England coach. Booth's team reached the final of the Guinness Premiership in his first season in charge after finishing third in the league. They went on to finish sixth (twice) and seventh.

In May 2012 Booth left London Irish for Bath to work under new head coach Gary Gold as forwards' coach, two months after Smith's return to the Exiles as director of rugby. In November 2019 he joined Harlequins as assistant coach. It was announced in February 2020 that Booth would be joining Ospreys as head coach at the end of the 2019/2020 season.

In Booth's first 4 years in charge his Ospreys have often been the best performing Welsh side in the URC, twice winning the regional Welsh Shield. In the 2023/24 season Booth guided them to the playoffs after they were given just a 2% chance of making the final 8 - the first time any Welsh side had made the knockout stages in 6 years, after the knockouts had been expanded to 8 teams. Booth left the Ospreys on the 17th of December 2024.

== Personal life ==
Whilst being interviewed on Sky Sports News, Booth mentioned he is a Manchester City supporter.
