= Conrad Meyer (bishop) =

English Catholic priest

- Bishop of Dorchester
- Diocese: Diocese of Oxford
- In office: 1979–1990 (ret.)
- Predecessor: Peter Walker
- Successor: Anthony Russell
- Other posts: Archdeacon of Bodmin (1969–1979); area bishop for Oxfordshire (1984–1990); Honorary assistant bishop, Truro (1990–1994); Roman Catholic priest (1994–2011)

Orders
- Ordination: CofE: 1948 (deacon); 1949 (priest); RC: 1995 (priest) by Frederic Cockin (CofE Bristol); Christopher Budd (RC Plymouth)
- Consecration: CofE: 1979 by Donald Coggan (Canterbury)

Personal details
- Born: 2 July 1922
- Died: 23 July 2011 (aged 89)
- Denomination: Anglo-Catholic (until 1994); Roman Catholic (thereafter)
- Education: Pembroke College, Cambridge

Conrad John Eustace Meyer (2 July 1922 – 23 July 2011) was an English Catholic priest and a former Church of England bishop.

Meyer was the son of William Eustace Meyer. He was educated at Clifton College and Pembroke College, Cambridge. During the Second World War he served in the Royal Naval Volunteer Reserve. He was made deacon in Advent 1948 (19 December) and ordained priest the following Advent (18 December 1949) — both times by Frederic Cockin, Bishop of Bristol, at Bristol Cathedral. His first ordained ministry positions were curacies at Ashton Gate and Kenwyn. He was vicar of Devoran from 1954 to 1964. From 1969 to 1979 he was Archdeacon of Bodmin. On 25 January 1979, he was consecrated a bishop by Donald Coggan, Archbishop of Canterbury, at Westminster Abbey; to serve as Bishop suffragan of Dorchester, a position that he held until 1987; he became the first area bishop in 1984 when the diocese's area scheme was erected. From 1990 to 1994 he was an honorary assistant bishop in the Diocese of Truro.

In February 1994, Meyer announced his decision to be received into full communion with the Catholic Church; in September 1994, Meyer became a Roman Catholic and in June 1995 he was ordained as a Roman Catholic priest by Christopher Budd, Roman Catholic Bishop of Plymouth, at Buckfast Abbey. In 2009 he was made a monsignor by Pope Benedict XVI.

Church of England titles
Preceded by Peter Walker	Bishop of Dorchester; 1979–1988	Succeeded by Anthony Russell
