= Peter Walker (bishop) =

British bishop

The Right Reverend Peter Walker
- Bishop of Ely
- Church: Church of England
- Diocese: Diocese of Ely
- In office: 1977 to 1989
- Predecessor: Edward Roberts
- Successor: Stephen Sykes

Orders
- Ordination: 1954
- Consecration: 1972

Personal details
- Born: Peter Knight Walker; 6 December 1919
- Died: 28 December 2010 (aged 91)
- Denomination: Anglicanism
- Education: Leeds Grammar School
- Alma mater: The Queen's College, Oxford

Peter Knight Walker (6 December 1919 – 28 December 2010) was an Anglican bishop.

== Early life and education ==
Walker was educated at Leeds Grammar School and The Queen's College, Oxford.

During the Second World War, he served in the Royal Naval Volunteer Reserve (RNVR). He was then a teacher at The King's School, Peterborough and Merchant Taylors' School, Northwood.

== Ordained ministry ==
Walker was ordained in 1954. His first ordained ministry position was a curacy at Hemel Hempstead, after which he was fellow, dean and lecturer at Corpus Christi College, Cambridge. From 1962 to 1972 he was principal of Westcott House, Cambridge.

In 1972 he was consecrated to the episcopate as the Suffragan Bishop of Dorchester. In 1977 he was translated to become the Bishop of Ely, a position he held until his retirement in 1989.

== Death ==
He died in Cambridge on 28 December 2010, aged 91.

Church of England titles
| Preceded by David Goodwin Loveday | Bishop of Dorchester; 1972–1977 | Succeeded by Conrad John Eustace Meyer |
| Preceded by Edward James Keymer Roberts | Bishop of Ely; 1977–1989 | Succeeded by Stephen Sykes |
