= Kenneth Riches =

Anglican bishop (1908–1999)

The Right Reverend Kenneth Riches
- Bishop of Lincoln
- Church: Church of England
- Diocese: Diocese of Lincoln
- In office: 1957 to 1974
- Predecessor: Maurice Harland
- Successor: Simon Phipps
- Other posts: Bishop of Dorchester (1952–1957); Principal of Cuddesdon College (1945–1952)

Orders
- Ordination: 1932 (deacon); 1933 (priest)
- Consecration: 1952

Personal details
- Born: 20 September 1908
- Died: 15 May 1999 (aged 90)
- Denomination: Anglicanism
- Education: Colchester Royal Grammar School
- Alma mater: Corpus Christi College, Cambridge; Cuddesdon College

Kenneth Riches (20 September 1908 – 15 May 1999) was an Anglican bishop during the second half of the 20th century. He served as the bishop of Dorchester from 1952 to 1957, and as the Bishop of Lincoln from 1957 to 1974. He was also the principal of Cuddesdon College, an Anglo-Catholic theological college, between 1945 and 1952.

== Early life and education ==
Riches was born on 20 September 1908. He was educated at Colchester Royal Grammar School, a state grammar school in Colchester, Essex. He studied theology at Corpus Christi College, Cambridge, graduating with a first class Bachelor of Arts (BA) degree in 1931. As per tradition, his BA was promoted to a Master of Arts (MA Cantab) in 1935. He then trained for Holy Orders at Cuddesdon College, an Anglo-Catholic theological college near Oxford.

== Ordained ministry ==
Riches was ordained in the Church of England as a deacon in 1932 and as a priest in 1933. From 1932 to 1935, he served his curacy at St Mary's Church, Portsea. From 1935 to 1936, he was an assistant curate at St John the Evangelist, East Dulwich in the Diocese of Southwark. Then, from 1936 to 1942, he served as chaplain and librarian of Sidney Sussex College, Cambridge. On 2 September 1939, he was commissioned into the Royal Army Chaplains' Department as a Chaplain to the Forces 4th Class (equivalent in rank to captain). From 1942 to 1945, he was Rector of Bredfield with Boulge in the Diocese of St Edmundsbury and Ipswich and the Director of Service Ordination Candidates.

In 1945, Riches was appointed Principal of Cuddesdon College, an Anglo-Catholic theological college near Oxford, and Vicar of All Saints Church, Cuddesdon.

=== Episcopal ministry ===
In 1952, he was consecrated a bishop and appointed as Bishop of Dorchester, a suffragan bishop in the Diocese of Oxford. In 1956, he was translated to the Bishopric of Lincoln.

While Bishop of Lincoln he failed to act on allegations of child abuse. He was informed in 1969 about abuse committed by Roy Griffiths, then deputy head teacher and boarding master of Lincoln Cathedral School, but did not act. He was informed of further allegations in 1970, but neither the Diocese nor the school informed the police. Griffiths was allowed to leave and take up a job at an Anglican school in Papua New Guinea. In 2018, Griffiths was convicted of abusing six boys at the school between 1963 and 1970, following an investigation into historical sexual abuse in the Diocese.

=== Views ===
Riches supported closer links between Anglicans and Methodists. He was a supporter of the ordination of women. He belonged to the Catholic tradition of the Church of England.

Church of England titles
Preceded by Gerald Allen	Bishop of Dorchester; 1952– 1957	Succeeded by David Loveday
Preceded by Maurice Harland	Bishop of Lincoln; 1957 – 1974	Succeeded by Simon Phipps
