= Archdeacon of Dorking =

Church of England ecclesiastical office

The Archdeacon of Dorking is a senior ecclesiastical officer in the Diocese of Guildford, responsible for clergy discipline and church buildings within the area of her/his archdeaconry.

== History ==
The Archdeaconry of Dorking is a subdivision of the Church of England Diocese of Guildford (itself part of the Province of Canterbury.) The archdeaconry consists of the deaneries of Dorking, Emly, Epsom, Leatherhead, Runnymede and Woking. The archdeaconry of Dorking was split from archdeaconry of Surrey by Order in Council on 17 August 1928.

== List of archdeacons ==
- 1928–8 July 1930 (d.): Ronald Irwin DSO MC
- 1930–1936 (res.): Cyril Golding-Bird, Assistant Bishop (became Archdeacon of Surrey)
- 1936–24 July 1954 (d.): Edward Newill
- 1954–1957 (res.): David Loveday
- 1957–23 December 1962 (d.): Windsor Roberts
- 1963–1968 (res.): Kenneth Evans
- 1968–1982 (ret.): William Purcell
- 1982–1990 (ret.): Peter Hogben (afterwards archdeacon emeritus)
- 1990–1995 (res.): Christopher Herbert
- 1995–2005 (res.): Mark Wilson (archdeacon emeritus since 2011)
- 2005–2013: Julian Henderson (Note: Henderson was consecrated as Bishop of Blackburn in October 2013.)
- 2014–2019:Paul Bryer
- 24 November 2019 – present: Martin Breadmore

== Sources ==
- 1927 Diocese of Guildford Bishops Deans and Archdeacons of Dorking (Retrieved 16 February 2013)
