= Stephen Sykes =

English bishop and theologian (1939–2014)

The Right Reverend Stephen Sykes
- Bishop of Ely
- Church: Church of England
- Diocese: Ely
- In office: 1990 – 1 September 1999
- Predecessor: Peter Walker
- Successor: Anthony Russell
- Other posts: Principal of St John's College, Durham (1999–2006); Regius Professor of Divinity (Cambridge; 1985–1990); Van Mildert Professor of Divinity (Durham; 1974–1985)

Orders
- Ordination: 1964 (deacon); 1965 (priest)
- Consecration: 2 May 1990 by Robert Runcie

Personal details
- Born: 1 August 1939
- Died: 24 September 2014 (aged 75)
- Denomination: Anglican
- Spouse: Marianne Hinton (m. 1962)
- Children: 1 son; 2 daughters
- Profession: Academic (Professor of theology/divinity)
- Education: St John's College, Cambridge

Stephen Whitefield Sykes (1 August 1939 – 24 September 2014) was a Church of England bishop and academic specialising in divinity. He was Van Mildert Professor of Divinity at Durham University from 1974 to 1985, and Regius Professor of Divinity at Cambridge University from 1985 to 1990. Between 1990 and 1999, he served as the Bishop of Ely, the diocesan bishop of the Diocese of Ely. He was the Principal of St John's College, Durham from 1999 to 2006. He served as an Honorary Assistant Bishop in the Diocese of Durham during his time as head of St John's College and in retirement.

== Early life ==
Sykes was born on 1 August 1939 in Bristol, England; his father was the principal of one of the city's theological colleges. He was educated at Monkton Combe School, then an all-boys private school in Bath, Somerset. He matriculated into St John's College, Cambridge in 1958 to study theology. He graduated from the University of Cambridge with a first class Bachelor of Arts (BA) degree in 1961. He then trained for ordination at Ripon Hall, Oxford.

== Career ==
=== Ordained ministry ===
Sykes was ordained deacon in 1964 and priest in 1965. In 1964, he returned to St John's College, Cambridge, his alma mater, as dean of the college chapel. When he moved to Durham in 1974, he became a residentiary canon of Durham Cathedral. Having returned to Cambridge in 1985, he was given a corresponding honorary canonry at Ely Cathedral. He served as a curate of St John the Evangelist's Church, Cambridge, from 1985 to 1990.

On 2 May 1990, he was consecrated as the Bishop of Ely. He became a Lord Spiritual through seniority and served in the House of Lords from 31 August 1996 to 31 July 1999. He stepped down from this position on 1 September 1999 and returned to education. From 1999 to 2014, when he was head of St John's College and during retirement, he served as an honorary assistant bishop in the Diocese of Durham.

From 1991 he was a member of the Doctrine Commission of the Church of England. He served as its chairman from 1996 to 2002.

=== Academic career ===
In addition to serving as dean of St John's College, Sykes was a member of the Faculty of Divinity at the University of Cambridge. He was an assistant lecturer in divinity from 1964 to 1968, then a lecturer in divinity from 1968 to 1974. In 1974, he was appointed as the Van Mildert Professor of Divinity at Durham University. In 1985, he returned to Cambridge University to take up the chair of Regius Professor of Divinity. During a break from academia he served as a bishop: he was Bishop of Ely from 1990 to 1999. In 1999, he was appointed the principal of St John's College, Durham. St John's is both a college of Durham University and an Anglican theological college. He retired in 2006.

== Later life ==
Following his retirement, Sykes remained living in Durham. In his later years, he developed a neurological condition that confined him to a wheelchair.

Sykes died on 24 September 2014, aged 75. He was survived by his wife and children, though his wife died eight weeks later. His funeral was held in Durham Cathedral on 10 October 2014. He was later buried in Cambridge at a woodland burial site.

== Personal life ==
In 1962, Sykes married Marianne Hinton, known as Joy. Together they had three children; one son and two daughters. Their son, Richard, is a barrister and both daughters, Joanna and Juliet, are trained as teachers.

His brother was Hugh Sykes.

Academic offices
Preceded by Hugh Turner	Van Mildert Professor of Divinity (Durham); 1974–1985	Succeeded by Daniel W. Hardy
Preceded by Henry Chadwick	Regius Professor of Divinity (Cambridge); 1985–1990	Succeeded by David F. Ford
Preceded by David V. Day	Principal of St John's College, Durham; 1999–2006	Succeeded by David Wilkinson
Church of England titles
Preceded by Peter Walker	Bishop of Ely; 1990–1999	Succeeded by Anthony Russell
