= The Harvey Grammar School =

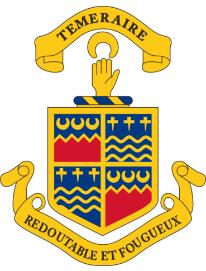

Location
- Cheriton Road; Folkestone, Kent, CT19 5JY; England; 51.08627°N 1.1573°E

Information
- Type: Grammar school Academy
- Motto: Téméraire Redoutable et Fougueux (Reckless, Formidable and Impetuous)
- Established: 1674; 352 years ago
- Founder: William Harvey
- Department for Education URN: 138480 Tables
- Ofsted: Reports
- Headmaster: Scott Norman
- Gender: Boys
- Age: 11 to 18
- Enrolment: 992
- Houses: Resolution; Discovery; Endeavour; Victory
- Colours: Red; Green; Blue; Yellow
- Website: http://www.harveygs.kent.sch.uk

The Harvey Grammar School is located in Folkestone, Kent, England. It is a grammar school with academy status founded by the family of William Harvey in 1674.

== Admissions ==
A selective grammar school for boys only, the school has around 1000 on its roll. Although officially known as the Harvey Grammar School, it is called The Harvey by many locals or abbreviated to HGS, as its partner school the Folkestone School for Girls is known "FSG".

The school is situated on Cheriton Road on the A2034 (once the A20) at the junction of the B2064 and near the Folkestone West railway station, Folkestone Cricket Club, Folkestone Optimists Hockey Club at the Three Hills Sports Park and Folkestone Invicta F.C. It is easily accessed from the last junction of the M20 motorway.

== History ==
The grammar school was established in 1674, following the death of William Harvey, the eminent physician and discoverer of the major details of blood circulation. A small class with one schoolmaster was first created, until Eliab Harvey, William's nephew, acting as executor of his uncle's will, founded a larger school of the name. Eliab Harvey was the Captain of HMS Temaraire, the ship immediately behind HMS Victory in the line at the Battle of Trafalgar. The school motto 'Temaraire, Redoutable et Fougueux' is a composite of HMS Temaraire, and the two French Ships Harvey captured at the battle.

In July 1921, the body of the headmaster of the day, 43-year-old Major Harold Arthur Denham, was found in undergrowth in Hawkinge with self-inflicted bullet wounds. An inquest later arrived at a verdict of "suicide while temporarily insane".

== Leadership and structure ==
The school has a well established house system, with four houses (Discovery, Endeavour, Resolution and Victory) that use the colours green, blue, red and yellow respectively. Each house is split into 5 separate forms and split between junior and senior (e.g., DJ1, DS1, EJ1, ES1, etc) The current head teacher is Scott Norman and current chair of governors is John Dennis. The current head boy is Mikey Drury, and the current Deputy Head boys are Sam Grant and Jacob Bailey.

== The school ==
The main school site is situated in the Folkestone suburb of Cheriton. It has been there since 1912-13 when the main building was constructed. In 1989, school buildings in the town centre, next to the Folkestone Library, were closed on completion of a new Science & Technology Block on the main site. A sports hall was added in 1997 and, in 2001, a further building was added with facilities for ICT, Art, Business Studies and Biology; this was named the John Edwards Centre in 2002 in honour of the school's headmaster from 1986 to 2002. In 2015, a new 12 classroom building was added and named the Wright building in honour of Bill Wright, who served as headteacher between 2008 and 2014. In 2017, a new P.E block was constructed of which includes a gymnasium and fitness suite along with 2 classrooms for the Religious Studies department. This new block is annexed with the current Sports Hall. The school also boasts an adjacent sports field named in honour of long serving Head of PE Alan Philpott, with a cricket pavilion named after former pupil Les Ames (Kent and England wicketkeeper-batsman); money for this was raised by the Old Harveians Association under the leadership of its president, John Smith. The pavilion was opened in 1997 by Colin Cowdrey in a ceremony also attended by Godfrey Evans, another famous former Kent and England wicketkeeper. In a special match to mark the pavilion opening, the school's 1st XI cricket team played a celebrity team that included ex Kent and England opening batsmen Brian Luckhurst and Mike Denness. The school also benefits from the proximity of the Three Hills sports facilities.

== The school's secret war contribution at Station X ==

Three former staff and a pupil at the Harvey worked at the once secret code breaking centre at Bletchley Park in Milton Keynes, which was recently made public and has become a tourist attraction. Their unique roles are honoured on a plaque in the school hall. The school's Headmaster Oliver Berthoud (1946–1952) was there, as was the school's long-serving secretary Miss Audrey Wind. Although they worked closely in the school it was not until a discussion one day in Mr Berthoud's office that he managed to get Miss Wind to admit to her involvement and they spoke at length about their time there.

On a visit to the school in late 2006 Miss Wind commented that no one was allowed to talk about their involvement. They were sworn to secrecy and it was amazing that four Harveians had worked for Ultra during the war. She is the sole survivor of the four but now in her eighties still gives talks on the topic at functions and at the school to boys studying the period. Following her half-century of service to the school, Miss Wind became the first and only female member of the school's old boys' association.

== Buildings ==
- Main Building - as seen from Cheriton Road
- Edwards Centre - named after former headmaster E.J. Edwards
- Wright Building - named after former headmaster W. T. Wright
- Science Block - incorporating Design & Technology and Performing Arts
- Sixth Form Centre
- Diner
- Sports Hall & Gym

== Notable former pupils ==
- Ronnie Aldrich - leader of the Squadronaires band
- Les Ames, Kent and England wicket-keeper-batsman
- Edward Argar MP, the Conservative member of parliament for Charnwood.
- Arthur David Baker, Professor, Queens College, City University of New York, NY, USA
- Mark D Baker, Professor, University of Guelph, Guelph, Ontario, Canada
- Michael Baker (academic), Professor of Marketing from 1971 to 1999 at the University of Strathclyde, and president from 1986 to 2005 of the Academy of Marketing
- Toby Booth, head coach at Ospreys rugby union club
- Air Marshal Sir Leslie Bower CB DFC DSO
- Andrew Brownsword, former greeting card magnate and owner of Bath Rugby Club, worth £195m (163 Times Rich List 2003). Owns the aBode chain of hotels.
- Alex Cornish, singer-songwriter
- Tom Fletcher CMG, Government advisor, former British ambassador, and principal of Hertford College, Oxford.
- Maj-Gen Alfred Gadd CBE, Director of Army Education from 1962 to 1965.
- Sir George Gardiner, Conservative MP for Reigate from 1974 to 1997, former chairman of the 92 Group
- Lewis Harmer, Drapers Professor of French from 1951 to 1967 at the University of Cambridge
- Steven Heard, British Olympic 800m runner, attended the school from 1973 to 1980.
- Charlie Hemphrey, cricketer.
- Peter Hogben, prominent clergyman.
- Sam Homewood, television presenter. Left the school in 2007.
- Richard Huckle (born 1986), convicted sex offender; dubbed "Britain's worst paedophile"
- Lord Imbert of New Romney, formerly Peter Imbert, Commissioner of the Metropolitan Police, who played a role in bringing the Balcombe Street siege to a conclusion.
- David Johnson CMG CVO, High Commissioner to Guyana and Ambassador to Suriname from 1993 to 1998
- Peter Kircher, former drummer with rock group Status Quo, was a pupil at the school in the 1950s and early 1960s
- Howard Losty, Director from 1971 to 1977 of the (GEC) Hirst Research Centre
- Michael Mingos, Principal of St Edmund Hall, Oxford and Professor of Inorganic Chemistry in the University of Oxford.
- Ken Packer, Professor in Chemistry, University of Nottingham from 1993 to 2001, and Editor from 1982 to 1988 of Molecular Physics
- Noel Redding, played bass guitar in the Jimi Hendrix Experience (there is a mural painting celebrating him near the school office, painted on site in sections by the pupils)
- Athol Riddell MBE, Professor of Surgery from 1964 to 1974 at the University of Bristol, and based at Southmead Hospital
- Andrew Cole CBE, Ex Director of Specialist Investigations at HMRC
- Gerald Sinstadt, television sports commentator
- Ian Stewart, mathematician
- Robert Tavernor, Emeritus Professor of Architecture and Urban Design at the London School of Economics (LSE)
- Anthony R. West, British chemist, and Professor of Electroceramics and Solid State Chemistry at the University of Sheffield.
- Tim Wren, Kent County cricketer.
- Peter J Philpott, Cunard Lines Captain and Master of the famous ocean liner Queen Mary 2
