= Tyndale Old Testament Commentaries =

Tyndale Old Testament Commentaries (or TOTC) is a series of commentaries in English on the Old Testament. It is published by the Inter-Varsity Press.

Constantly being revised since its first being completed, the series seek to bridge the gap between brevity and scholarly comment.

== Reviews ==
These commentaries are authored by respected English, South African, Australian, Irish, and American evangelical scholars. They are in the main directed toward a nonspecialist audience. They emphasize exegesis. They are brief, but usually informative. The second generation TOTC commentaries are beginning to appear with David Firth as main editor.

— Tremper Longman III

== Titles ==
- Steinmann, Andrew E. (2019). Genesis: An Introduction and Commentary. Vol. 1. Downers Grove, IL: IVP Academic. ISBN 9780830842513. - 496 pages

- replaced - Kidner, Derek. Genesis: An Introduction and Survey. Vol. 1. Downers Grove, IL: IVP Academic. - 240 pages

- Cole, R. Alan. Exodus: An Introduction and Survey. Vol. 2. Downers Grove, IL: IVP Academic. - 288 pages
- Sklar, Jay. Leviticus: An Introduction and Survey. Vol. 3. Downers Grove, IL: IVP Academic. - 336 pages

- replaced - Harrison, R. K. Leviticus: An Introduction and Survey. Vol. 3. Downers Grove, IL: Inter-Varsity Press. - ? pages

- Wenham, Gordon J. Numbers: An Introduction and Survey. Vol. 4. Downers Grove, IL: IVP Academic. - 272 pages
- Woods, Edward J. (2011). Deuteronomy: An Introduction and Survey. Vol. 5. Downers Grove, IL: IVP Academic. ISBN 9780830842810. - 333 pages*

- replaced - Thompson, J. A. Deuteronomy. Vol. 5. Downers Grove, IL: IVP Academic. - 349 pages

- Hess, Richard S. (2008). Joshua: An Introduction and Survey. Vol. 6. Downers Grove, IL: IVP Academic. ISBN 978-1-844-74261-5. - 336 pages
- Cundall, Arthur E.; Morris, Leon (1968). Judges and Ruth: An Introduction and Survey. Vol. 7. Downers Grove, IL: Inter-Varsity Press. ISBN 978-0-877-84896-7. - 336 pages
- Baldwin, Joyce G. 1 and 2 Samuel: An Introduction and Survey. Vol. 8. Downers Grove, IL: IVP Academic. - 320 pages
- Dharamraj, Havilah (2025). 1 and 2 Kings: An Introduction and Survey. Vol. 9. Downers Grove, IL: IVP Academic. - 336 pages

- replaced - Wiseman, Donald J. 1 and 2 Kings: An Introduction and Survey. Vol. 9. Downers Grove, IL: IVP Academic. - 336 pages

- Selman, Martin J. 1 Chronicles: An Introduction and Survey. Vol. 10. Downers Grove, IL: IVP Academic. - 274 pages
- Selman, Martin J. 2 Chronicles: An Introduction and Survey. Vol. 11. Downers Grove, IL: IVP Academic. - 304 pages
- Kidner, Derek. Ezra and Nehemiah: An Introduction and Survey. Vol. 12. Downers Grove, IL: IVP Academic. - 176 pages
- Reid, Debra (2008). Esther: An Introduction and Survey. Vol. 13. Downers Grove, IL: IVP Academic. ISBN 978-1-844-74244-8. - 176 pages

- replaced - Baldwin, Joyce G. Esther: An Introduction and Survey. Vol. 13. Downers Grove, IL: Inter-Varsity Press. - ? pages

- Andersen, Francis I. Job: An Introduction and Survey. Vol. 14. Downers Grove, IL: IVP Academic. - 318 pages
- Longman III, Tremper. Psalms: An Introduction and Survey. Vol. 15–16 (2nd ed.). Downers Grove, IL: IVP Academic. - 479 pages

- replaced Kidner, Derek (1975). Psalms 1-72: An Introduction and Survey. Vol. 15. Downers Grove, IL: Inter-Varsity Press. - 196 pages
- replaced Kidner, Derek (1975). Psalms 73–150: An Introduction and Survey. Vol. 16. Downers Grove, IL: Inter-Varsity Press. - 529 pages

- Kidner, Derek. Proverbs: An Introduction and Survey. Vol. 17. Downers Grove, IL: IVP Academic. - 192 pages
- Eaton, Michael A. Ecclesiastes: An Introduction and Survey. Vol. 18. Downers Grove, IL: IVP Academic. - 176 pages
- Duguid, Iain (2015). The Song of Songs: An Introduction and Survey. Vol. 19. Downers Grove, IL: IVP Academic. ISBN 978-0-830-84286-5. - 160 pages
- Motyer, J. Alec. Isaiah: An Introduction and Survey. Vol. 20. Downers Grove, IL: IVP Academic. - 432 pages
- Lalleman, Hetty (2013). Jeremiah and Lamentations: An Introduction and Survey. Vol. 21. Downers Grove, IL: IVP Academic. ISBN 978-0-830-84283-4. - 373 pages

- replaced Harrison, R.K. (1981). Jeremiah & Lamentations. Vol. 21. Downers Grove, IL: IVP Academic. ISBN 9780877842712. - 240 pages

- Taylor, John B. Ezekiel: An Introduction and Survey. Vol. 22. Downers Grove, IL: IVP Academic. - 277 pages
- Baldwin, Joyce G. Daniel: An Introduction and Survey. Vol. 23. Downers Grove, IL: IVP Academic. - 224 pages
- Hubbard, David Allan. Hosea: An Introduction and Survey. Vol. 24. Downers Grove, IL: IVP Academic. - 240 pages
- Hubbard, David Allan. Joel and Amos: An Introduction and Survey. Vol. 25. Downers Grove, IL: IVP Academic. - 256 pages
- Alexander, T. Desmond; Baker, David W.; Waltke, Bruce K. Obadiah, Jonah and Micah: An Introduction and Survey. Vol. 26. Downers Grove, IL: IVP Academic. - 224 pages
- Baker, David W. Nahum, Habakkuk, Zephaniah: An Introduction and Survey. Vol. 27. Downers Grove, IL: IVP Academic. - 144 pages
- Hill, Andrew E. (2012). Haggai, Zechariah, Malachi: An Introduction and Survey. Vol. 28. Downers Grove, IL: IVP Academic. ISBN 978-0830842827. - 368 pages

== See also ==
- Tyndale New Testament Commentaries
- Exegesis
