= Bishop of Dorchester =

Suffragan bishop in the Church of England

The modern Bishop Suffragan of Dorchester in the Diocese of Oxford, usually contracted to Bishop of Dorchester, is an episcopal title used by an area bishop of the Church of England Diocese of Oxford, in the Province of Canterbury, England. The Bishop of Dorchester, along with the Bishop of Buckingham and the Bishop of Reading, assists the Diocesan Bishop of Oxford in overseeing the diocese.

The title takes its name from the town of Dorchester-on-Thames in Oxfordshire, and was first used by the historic Bishops of Dorchester: at first for a West Saxon diocese (see Bishop of Winchester), and later for a Mercian diocese (see Bishop of Lincoln). Dorchester Abbey was built on the site of the ancient Cathedral. The suffragan See was erected by Order-in-Council (under the Suffragans Nomination Act 1888) on 2 February 1939. The bishops suffragan of Dorchester have been area bishops since the Oxford area scheme was founded in 1984.

== List of bishops ==
Suffragan Bishops of Dorchester
From	Until	Incumbent	Notes
1939	1952	Gerald Allen	Formerly Bishop of Sherborne; hitherto Assistant Bishop of Oxford since 1936; Archdeacon of Oxford and Canon of Christ Church
1952	1956	Kenneth Riches	Translated to Lincoln
1957	1972	David Loveday	
1972	1977	Peter Walker	Translated to Ely
1979	1988	Conrad Meyer	First area bishop from 1984.
1988	2000	Anthony Russell	Translated to Ely
2000	2020	Colin Fletcher	Retired 4 October 2020.
2021	present	Gavin Collins	Consecration postponed; licensed Episcopal vicar 28 January 2021; consecrated on 14 April 2021
