= Ronald Irwin =

Ronald John Beresford Irwin, DSO MC (1 August 1880 – 8 July 1930) was the first Archdeacon of Dorking, serving two years until his death aged 49.

== Life and career ==
Born on 1 August 1880, Irwin was educated at Winchester College and Keble College, Oxford. He was ordained in 1905 and was a chaplain in India from 1909 to 1923 and a chaplain to the Forces during World War I achieving the DSO and MC (see above) and Vicar of Lillington from 1922 to 1927. By Order in Council, a second Archdeaconry was added to the Diocese of Guildford on 17 August 1928 leading to a brief tenure in this new post as Irwin died on 8 July 1930 in the Brighton Registration District of the neighbouring county of Sussex aged 49.

Church of England titles
Preceded by Inaugural appointment	Archdeacon of Dorking; 1928–1930	Succeeded by Cyril Henry Golding-Bird
