= Calvin T. Samuel =

Barbados-born minister and theologian

Revd Dr Calvin T Samuel
- Spouse: Jaclyn Victor (m. 2025)

Academic background
- Education: Nazarene Theological College, Manchester Business School, King's College London
- Thesis: Holiness and Holy School - What is Wesleyan Holiness according to Scripture, Tradition, Reason and Experience and what might a Methodist holy school be? (2008)
- Doctoral advisor: Andrew Wright

Calvin T Samuel is a Barbados-born Methodist minister and theologian, working mostly in the UK. He has served as Director of the Wesley Study Centre at Durham University and Principal of the London School of Theology.

Samuel was born in Barbados. His father and mother were, respectively, a politician and teacher. He grew up in both Antigua and Barbados in the Caribbean. His early career was in banking before he moved to the UK in 1993 to study for an undergraduate degree in Theology and Pastoral Studies at Nazarene Theological College, Manchester. He subsequently gained an MBA from Manchester Business School and completed a PhD at King's College London.

Initially a licensed minister of the Wesleyan Holiness Church, he was received into full connexion and ordained into the Methodist Church in 2001. He was subsequently a member of Methodism’s Faith and Order Committee.

== Career in Education ==
Samuel was Assistant Director of Research and Faculty Administration at London Business School and a visiting lecturer in Biblical studies at Nazarene Theological College alongside his ministry. He was later appointed New Testament Tutor at Spurgeon's College, London.

He then became Director of the Wesley Study Centre, based at St John's College, Durham and was appointed Academic Dean of its Cranmer Hall ministerial training college. In 2017 he was appointed Principal of the London School of Theology until February 2019 when, during an internal investigation into alleged misconduct, his resignation was accepted.

In 2020 he was appointed Chair of Methodist Independent Schools Trust, whilst also serving as Methodist Presbyter for the Essex towns of Hockley & Hawkwell, Rochford and Rayleigh in the city of Southend.

Since 2024 Dr Samuel has been Director of Wadadli Wisdom an Executive Leadership Coaching Agency.

== Publications and media ==
Samuel has published two books:

- Samuel, Calvin T. (30 Jul 2018). More Distinct — Reclaiming Holiness for the World Today. IVP. ISBN 9781783597086.
- Samuel, Calvin T. (31 Dec 2018). Preparing for Marriage. Malcolm Down Publishing. ISBN 978-1910786987.

From time to time he has also broadcast devotional items on BBC Radio 4 and Premier Christian Radio.
