= Max Turner (theologian) =

British New Testament scholar

Martin Maximillian Barnaby Turner (1947 – 15 August 2026) was a British New Testament scholar.

He is evangelical, and a Baptist minister, although as a young Christian he was associated with the Elim Pentecostal Church. His charismatic roots have generated an interest in the theology of the Holy Spirit, especially in Luke-Acts.

His books on the subject have included The Holy Spirit and Spiritual Gifts: Then and Now (1996) and Power from on High: The Spirit in Israel's Restoration and Witness in Luke-Acts (1996). He also collaborated with Peter Cotterell on Linguistics and Biblical Interpretation (1989).

Until his retirement in 2011, Turner was Professor of New Testament at the London School of Theology. On retirement he was given the title of Emeritus Professor.

In 2012, a Festschrift was published in his honour. Christ in the New Testament and Christian Theology: Essays in Honor of Max Turner included contributions from Richard Bauckham, D. A. Carson, James D. G. Dunn, Joel B. Green, and I. Howard Marshall.

== Death ==
Turner died on 15 August 2026.
