= Anthony R. West =

British chemist and materials scientist

Anthony Roy West
- Born: 21 January 1947 (age 79); Sandwich, Kent, UK
- Education: University College Swansea; University of Aberdeen
- Scientific career
- Institutions: University of Aberdeen; University of Sheffield
- Doctoral advisor: Fredrik P. Glasser

Anthony Roy West FRSE, FRSC, FInstP, FIMMM (born 21 January 1947) is a British chemist and materials scientist, and Professor of Electroceramics and Solid State Chemistry at the University of Sheffield.

== Education ==
West was educated at The Harvey Grammar School and University College Swansea, where he gained a Bachelor of Science in chemistry in 1968. He then moved to the University of Aberdeen where he completed a PhD in 1971 under the supervision of Fredrik P. Glasser.

He was appointed lecturer at the University of Aberdeen in 1971 and gained his Doctor of Science (DSc) from the university in 1984. He became professor in chemistry in 1989. He then moved to the University of Sheffield in 1999 to become Head of the Department of Engineering Materials.

== Research ==
West's research has covered the synthesis of new oxide materials, crystal structure determination and structure-property relations with particular focus on ionic, electronic and mixed ionic-electronic conduction. This includes lithium ion conductors, oxygen ion conductor and superconductors. His research on these new materials has covered a broad range of conducting materials, including Li_{3}VO_{4}-Li_{4}(Si,Ge)O_{4} solid solutions with high lithium ion conductivity at room temperature, the Ca_{12}Al_{14}O_{33} oxide ion conductor and much research on barium titanate, such as that on the La-doped BaTiO3 high-permittivity dielectric. He discovered the first 5-volt cathode material for lithium battery applications, Li_{2}CoMn_{3}O_{8}.

One of his specialties has been development of the electrochemical impedance spectroscopy (see dielectric spectroscopy) technique for materials characterisation and electrical property measurements. He developed the impedance and modulus spectroscopy technique of data analysis with his colleague at Aberdeen, Malcolm Ingram and the Almond-West method for ac conductivity data analysis.

== Promotion of solid state and materials chemistry ==
West's book Solid State Chemistry and its applications and its condensed version "Basic Solid State Chemistry" are well-regarded texts in the field. An updated version of the former as a student edition was published in 2014.

West was the founder of the Royal Society of Chemistry's Journal of Materials Chemistry in 1991 and of the "Materials Chemistry" conference series in the UK, organising the first in Aberdeen in 1991.

== Awards and honours ==
West was awarded the John B. Goodenough Award of the Royal Society of Chemistry in 2013 for "his outstanding contributions to our understanding of structure-composition-property relationships in oxide-based materials, and their application in solid state devices, and for his preeminent role in promoting materials chemistry."

West is a Fellow of the Royal Society of Chemistry, Fellow of the Institute of Physics, Fellow of the Institute of Materials, Minerals and Mining and Fellow of the Royal Society of Edinburgh.

Awards:

- 2013 John B. Goodenough Award in Materials Chemistry, Royal Society of Chemistry
- 2009 Griffiths Medal and Prize, Institute of Materials, Minerals and Mining
- 2008 Epsilon de Oro Award, Spanish Society of Ceramics and Glass
- 2007 Chemical Record Lectureship, Chemical Societies of Japan
- 2008/09 Catedra de Excelencia, Universidad Carlos III, Leganés, Spain
- 1996 Industrial Award in Solid State Chemistry, RSC
- 1988/89 Research Support Fellowship, Royal Society of Edinburgh
- Honorary member of Materials Research Society of India
