= Julian Henderson =

British Anglican bishop (born 1954)

The Right Reverend Julian Henderson
- Bishop of Blackburn
- Church: Church of England
- Diocese: Diocese of Blackburn
- In office: 2013–2022
- Predecessor: Nicholas Reade
- Successor: Philip North
- Other post: Archdeacon of Dorking (2005–2013)

Orders
- Ordination: 1979 (deacon) by Gerald Ellison; 1980 (priest) by Jim Thompson
- Consecration: 10 October 2013 by John Sentamu

Personal details
- Born: 23 July 1954 (age 72)
- Denomination: Anglican
- Residence: Bishop's House, Salesbury
- Parents: Ian and Susan
- Spouse: Heather (m. 1984)
- Children: two
- Education: Keble College, Oxford; Ridley Hall, Cambridge

Member of the House of Lords
- Lord Spiritual
- Bishop of Blackburn; 6 February 2020 – 31 August 2022

Julian Tudor Henderson (born 23 July 1954) is a retired British Anglican bishop. From 2013 to 2022, he was the Bishop of Blackburn, the diocesan bishop of the Diocese of Blackburn in the Church of England. From 2005 to 2013, he was the Archdeacon of Dorking in the Diocese of Guildford.

== Early life and education ==
Henderson was born on 23 July 1954, to Ian and Susan Henderson. He was educated at Radley College, an all-boys public school in Oxfordshire before reading theology at Keble College, Oxford, where he graduated with a Bachelor of Arts (BA) degree in 1976. As per tradition, his BA was promoted to a Master of Arts (MA (Oxon)) degree in 1981. In 1977, he entered Ridley Hall, Cambridge, an Anglican theological college, and spent two years training for ordained ministry.

== Ordained ministry ==
Henderson was made a deacon in the Church of England at Michaelmas 1979 (30 September), by Gerald Ellison, Bishop of London, at St Paul's Cathedral, and ordained a priest the Michaelmas following (28 September 1980), by Jim Thompson, Bishop of Stepney, in his title church. He then served his three-year title post as assistant curate at St Mary's, Islington, London, being ordained a priest after the first year.

His first incumbency was as vicar of Emmanuel and St Mary in the Castle, Hastings, East Sussex from 1983 until he became vicar of Claygate (Holy Trinity), Surrey in 1992. While at Claygate, Henderson served as rural dean for Emly deanery from 1996 until 2001 and was made an honorary canon of Guildford Cathedral in 2001. In 2005, he was appointed Archdeacon of Dorking.

=== Episcopal ministry ===
10 Downing Street announced on 1 March 2013 that Henderson had been nominated diocesan Bishop of Blackburn. Having been elected by the Dean and Chapter of Blackburn Cathedral, his election was confirmed on 30 September 2013 at York Minster, he was consecrated a bishop there, by John Sentamu, Archbishop of York, on 10 October 2013, and inaugurated at his cathedral on 19 October 2013.

In August 2022, Henderson retired aftering announcing his intention to do so back in March of that year.

=== Views ===
Henderson is an Evangelical Anglican, and is the President of the Church of England Evangelical Council. He has also been described as a conservative evangelical. He supports traditional teaching relating to same-sex relationships.

In July 2024, he was commissioned by the Church of England Evangelical Council as an "overseer" to provided alternative spiritual oversight (not to be confused with the Church of England's official alternative episcopal oversight) to evangelical clergy and parishes in the Church of England who maintain traditional teaching on the doctrine of marriage and sexual ethics, following the General Synod's support for the introduction of a service of blessing for same sex couples.

== Personal life ==
Henderson married Heather in 1984, and they have two children.

== Styles ==
- The Reverend Julian Henderson (1979–2001)
- The Reverend Canon Julian Henderson (2001–2005)
- The Venerable Julian Henderson (2005–2013)
- The Right Reverend Julian Henderson (2013–present)
