= Jason Pooley =

English cricketer (born 1969)

Personal information
- Full name: Jason Calvin Pooley
- Born: 8 August 1969 (age 57); Hammersmith, London
- Batting: Left-handed
- Bowling: Right-arm off break

Domestic team information
- Years: Team
- 1989–1998: Middlesex
- FC debut: 13 September 1989 Middlesex v Kent
- Last FC: 13 June 1998 Middlesex v Oxford Univ.
- LA debut: 5 September 1990 Middlesex v Lancashire
- Last LA: 8 July 1998 Middlesex v Durham

Career statistics
Competition	First-class	List A
Matches	82	103
Runs scored	3,811	2,292
Batting average	30.48	25.46
100s/50s	8/17	1/14
Top score	138*	109
Balls bowled	60	–
Wickets	0	–
Bowling average	–	–
5 wickets in innings	–	–
10 wickets in match	–	–
Best bowling	–	–
Catches/stumpings	81/–	28/–
- Source: CricketArchive, 13 December 2008

Jason Calvin Pooley (born 8 August 1969) is a former cricketer, who represented Middlesex County Cricket Club in the County Championship. Pooley is now retired from cricket.

A left-handed batsman, Pooley played 82 first-class matches and 103 List A matches.

"He did not appear after 1998, when he was in effect a one-day specialist, becoming the second team coach in which role he continued to appear for the 2nd XI. He was also assistant coach to John Emburey."

Pooley's highest first-class score was 138* versus Cambridge University. His highest score against a county was 136, against Gloucestershire.

Pooley now lives with his wife and three children. His brother, Gregg, played second XI cricket for a number of counties.
