= Gavin Collins =

British Anglican bishop (born 1966)

The Right Reverend Gavin Collins
- Bishop of Dorchester
- Diocese: Diocese of Oxford
- In office: 2021–present
- Other post: Archdeacon of The Meon (2011–2021)

Orders
- Ordination: 1997 (deacon); 1998 (priest)
- Consecration: 14 April 2021 by Sarah Mullally

Personal details
- Born: Gavin Andrew Collins; 31 December 1966 (age 59)
- Denomination: Anglicanism
- Education: Trinity Hall, Cambridge; College of Law, Guildford; Trinity College, Bristol

Gavin Andrew Collins (born 31 December 1966) is a British Anglican bishop. He has been Bishop of Dorchester, an area bishop in the Diocese of Oxford, since 14 April 2021. From 2011 to 2021, he had been Archdeacon of The Meon in the Diocese of Portsmouth in Hampshire.

== Early life and education ==
Collins was born on 31 December 1966, and grew up in Sussex, England. He was educated at Sackville School, a comprehensive school in East Grinstead. He read law at Trinity Hall, Cambridge, graduating with a Bachelor of Arts (BA) degree in 1989, automatically progressing to a Master of Arts (MA Cantab) in 1993. While at Cambridge University, he served as prayer secretary of the Cambridge Inter-Collegiate Christian Union.

Having attended the College of Law, Guildford, he qualified as a solicitor and worked in the City of London. He left his legal career to train for ordination at Trinity College, Bristol, an evangelical Anglican theological college. He graduated with another BA in 1996 and a postgraduate Master of Arts (MA) degree in 1997.

== Ordained ministry ==
Collins was ordained in the Church of England as a deacon in 1997 and as a priest in 1998. He served his curacy at St Barnabas, Cambridge from 1997 to 2002. From 2002 to 2011, Vicar of Christ Church, Chorleywood, a conservative evangelical church in the Diocese of St Albans. He was additionally rural dean of Rickmansworth from 2006 to 2011. In 2009, he became an honorary canon of St Albans Cathedral. On 11 September 2011, Collins was collated as the second Archdeacon of The Meon at Portsmouth Cathedral.

Collins has been a member of the General Synod of the Church of England since 2013. He is one of the convenors of the Evangelical Forum, an open evangelical addition to the Synods' evangelical groupings. He contributed a chapter to Journeys in Grace and Truth: Revisiting Scripture and Sexuality, a book of essays from Anglican evangelicals who hold a positive view of same-sex relationships.

=== Episcopal ministry ===
Collins's appointment as the next Bishop of Dorchester, the area bishop for the whole county of Oxfordshire outside the cathedral city itself, was announced in November 2020. Due to the COVID-19 pandemic, his consecration as a bishop was postponed from 28 January, and instead he was licensed as episcopal vicar for the area ad interim; a role more common in the Roman Catholic Church and almost unique in the Church of England. His consecration was planned for 12 April, but because of the death of Prince Philip, Duke of Edinburgh that weekend, the service was held privately at Lambeth Palace on 14 April 2021 with a limited congregation under COVID restrictions, and it was not live-streamed. He was consecrated a bishop by Sarah Mullally, Bishop of London, in a service which began at 9:45am.

=== Views ===
In November 2022, Collins endorsed Steven Croft's call that clergy in the Church of England should be free to bless or marry same-sex partners and to enter into a same-sex marriage themselves; this is in contrast to the Church's current official position.

In November 2023, he was one of 44 Church of England bishops who signed an open letter supporting the use of the Prayers of Love and Faith (i.e. blessings for same-sex couples) and called for "Guidance being issued without delay that includes the removal of all restrictions on clergy entering same-sex civil marriages, and on bishops ordaining and licensing such clergy".

== Family ==
He is married to Christina and they have three children. He has a twin brother who is an Elder in the Baptist Church and a sister who is a Methodist Lay preacher.

== Selected works ==
- Gavin Collins (2016). "7. A Credible Witness". In Ozanne, Jayne (ed.). Journeys in grace and truth: revisiting scripture and sexuality. London: Ekklesia. ISBN 978-0993294242.

== Styles ==
- The Reverend Gavin Collins (1998–2009)
- The Reverend Canon Gavin Collins (2009–2010)
- The Venerable Gavin Collins (2011–2021)
- The Right Reverend Gavin Collins (2021–present)

Church of England titles
Preceded by Peter Hancock	Archdeacon of The Meon; 2011–present	Incumbent
