= Derek Tidball =

British theologian, sociologist of religion and Baptist minister

Derek Tidball Ph.D.
- Occupation: Erstwhile principal of London Bible College
- Spouse: Dianne Tidball
- Children: 1 son

Academic background
- Education: University of Durham, University of London
- Alma mater: Keele University
- Thesis: 'Evangelical Nonconformist Home Missions, 1796-1901' (1981)

Academic work
- Era: Late 20th and early 21st centuries
- Institutions: London School of Theology

Derek John Tidball is a British theologian, sociologist of religion, and Baptist minister. From 1995 to 2007 he was the principal of London Bible College which later took the name London School of Theology.

== Education ==
A graduate in sociology (University of Durham) and theology (University of London), Tidball was awarded a PhD (Keele University, 1981) for a dissertation entitled "Evangelical Nonconformist Home Missions, 1796-1901".

== Career ==
Tidball has served as minister of Northchurch Baptist Church in Berkhamsted and part-time tutor at the London Bible College (1972–77); Director of Studies of the London Bible College (1978–85); Senior Minister of Mutley Baptist Church, Plymouth (1985–91); Secretary for Evangelism and Mission of the Baptist Union of Great Britain (1991-1995); Principal of London School of Theology (the renamed London Bible College) (1995-2007) and as Visiting Scholar at Spurgeon's College, London. He is, however, no longer listed among BUGB Accredited Ministers.

Tidball has chaired, at various times, British Youth for Christ, the Shaftesbury Project, the British Church Growth Association and the Council of the Evangelical Alliance. He was President of the Baptist Union (1990–91) and is a vice-president of the Evangelical Alliance.

== Family ==
Tidball is married to the Reverend Dianne Tidball, Regional Minister for the East Midlands Baptist Association, England. They have one son.

== Publications ==
- An Introduction to the Sociology of the New Testament (Paternoster, 1983) (published in 1984 in the US by Academie Books, a division of Zondervan, under the title The Social Context of the New Testament)
- "On Wooing a Crocodile: An Historical Survey of the Relationship Between Sociology and New Testament Studies", Vox Evangelica 15 (1985), 95-110.
- Skilful Shepherds: An Introduction to Pastoral Theology (Apollos, 1986)
- Using the Bible in Evangelism (Bible Society, 1986)
- "A Response to A Question of Identity" in (ed.) D. Slater, A Perspective on Baptist Identity (Mainstream, 1987)
- A World without Windows, Living as a Christian in a Secular World, Scripture Union, 1987
- Who are the Evangelicals?: Tracing the Roots of Modern Movements (Marshall Pickering, 1994)
- "The Scandal of the Church in the Mission of God's people", in A. Billington, A. N. S. Lane & Max Turner (eds.), Mission and Meaning, (Paternoster, 1995)
- Builders and Fools: Leadership the Bible Way (IVP, 1999)
- The Reality is Christ: The Message of Colossians for Today (Christian Focus, 1999)
- The Message of the Cross (IVP, 2001)
- How Does God Guide? (Christian Focus, 2001)
- Discerning the Spirit of the Age (Kingsway, 2002)
- Thinking Clearly about the Bible (Monarch 2003)
- Wisdom from Heaven: The Message of James for Today (Christian Focus 2003)
- "The Pilgrim and the Tourist: Zygmunt Bauman and Postmodern Identity" in Craig Bartholomew and Fred Hughes (eds.), Explorations in a Christian Theology of Pilgrimage (Ashgate, 2004)
- The Message of Leviticus (IVP, 2005)
- "Power - 'In' and 'Upon': A Moody Sermon" in Timothy George (ed.), Mr Moody and the Evangelical Tradition (2005)
- "The Social Construction of Evangelical Conversion: A sideways glance" in Christopher Partridge and Helen Reid (eds.), Finding and Losing Faith: Studies in Conversion (Paternoster 2006)
- "A Baptist Perspective on David Wright's, What has Infant Baptism done to Baptism", Evangelical Quarterly 78.2 (April 2006)
- Meeting the Saviour: The glory of Jesus in the Gospel of John (BRF, 2007)
- "Penal Substitution: a Pastoral Apologetic" in The Atonement Debate: Papers from the London Symposium on the Theology of Atonement, Derek Tidball, David Hilborn, Justin Thacker (eds.), (Zondervan, 2008)
- Ministry by the Book (ISBN 0830838597, ISBN 978-0830838592, IVP Academic; 1 edition (July 1, 2009))
- "Post-war evangelical theology: a generational perspective", Evangelical Quarterly 81.2 (April 2009)
- "The Radical Evangelical: A Critical Appreciation" in Pieter J. Lalleman (ed.), Challenging to Change: dialogues with a radical Baptist theologian. Essays presented to Dr Nigel G. Wright on his sixtieth birthday (Spurgeon's College, 2009)
- Signposts: A devotional map of the Psalms (IVP, 2009)
- Preacher, Keep Yourself From Idols (IVP, 2011)
- The Message of Women: Creation, Grace and Gender [in series The Bible Speaks Today], co-authored with Dianne Tidball, (IVP, 2012)
