= Tim Wren =

English cricketer

Personal information
- Full name: Timothy Neil Wren
- Born: 26 March 1970 (age 56); Folkestone, Kent
- Batting: Right-handed
- Bowling: Left-arm medium
- Role: Bowler

Domestic team information
- Years: Team
- 1989–1997: Kent
- LA debut: 27 August 1989 Kent v Leicestershire
- Last LA: 25 May 1997 Kent v Sussex
- FC debut: 28 July 1989 Kent v Worcestershire
- Last FC: 28 June 1997 Kent v Cambridge University

Career statistics
Competition	First-class	List A
Matches	30	45
Runs scored	141	46
Batting average	6.71	7.66
100s/50s	0/0	0/0
Top score	23	7*
Balls bowled	4,024	1,773
Wickets	66	36
Bowling average	36.60	39.66
5 wickets in innings	3	1
10 wickets in match	0	0
Best bowling	6/48	6/41
Catches/stumpings	12/–	8/–
- Source: CricInfo, 5 April 2014

Timothy Neil Wren (born 26 March 1970) is an English former professional cricketer who played for Kent County Cricket Club during the 1990s.

== Early life ==
Wren was born at Folkestone in 1970, and attended Harvey Grammar School in the town. He made his debut for Kent's Second XI in 1987 and played under-25 cricket for the county the following year before making his First XI debut in 1989, opening the bowling and taking one wicket in a List A fixture against Leicestershire at Cheriton Road in Folkestone.

== Cricket career ==
A left-arm medium pace bowler, Wren made his first-class cricket debut the following season, playing in five of Kent's County Championship matches during 1990, although he took only six wickets. He played club cricket for Ashford Cricket Club during the early 1990s, where he was mentored by Peter Moralee, a Kent development coach working at Ashford Prep School, but Wren played only a handful of matches for the county side between 1991 and 1994, unable to break into the team on a regular basis.

Wren played most of his First XI cricket between 1994 and 1996, making seven first-class appearances in each of the three seasons and playing a significant role in Kent's one-day side during the period. He took 17 first-class and 8 List A wickets during 1994, and the following season took 23 first-class wickets, the most of his career. He also took 16 List A wickets as Kent won the Sunday league competition. After taking nine first-class and seven List A wickets in 1996 he played just five matches in 1997, taking only one wicket, and was released by the club at the end of the season.

== Post-retirement ==
After retiring from top-level cricket, Wren played in the Kent Cricket League for Sibton Park and Canterbury Cricket Clubs. His family owns a plumbing and heating engineering business in Folkestone and Wren worked in the company as an engineer during the off-season when he was playing professionally. He has since become a partner in the family business.
