= Anthony Russell (bishop) =

English Anglican clergyman (1943–2025)

The Right Reverend Anthony Russell
- Bishop of Ely
- Church: Church of England
- Diocese: Diocese of Ely
- In office: 2000 – 28 February 2010
- Predecessor: Stephen Sykes
- Successor: Stephen Conway
- Other posts: Bishop Suffragan of Dorchester in the Diocese of Oxford; 1988–2000; Chaplain to The Queen; 1983–1988

Orders
- Ordination: 1971
- Consecration: 1988

Personal details
- Born: 25 January 1943
- Died: 9 July 2025 (aged 82)
- Denomination: Anglican
- Profession: Author
- Education: St Chad's College, Durham

Member of the House of Lords
- Lord Spiritual
- Bishop of Ely; 10 December 2007 – 28 February 2010

Anthony John Russell (25 January 1943 – 9 July 2025) was an English Anglican bishop. He was the Diocesan Bishop of Ely from 2000 to 2010, having previously served as an area bishop in the Diocese of Oxford from 1988.

== Early life ==
Russell was born on 25 January 1943. He was educated at Uppingham School, St Chad's College, Durham (he gained a Bachelor of Arts {BA} degree) and Trinity College, Oxford, where he earned a Doctor of Philosophy (DPhil) degree. Russell studied for ordination at Ripon College Cuddesdon.

== Ecclesiastical career ==
Russell was made a deacon during Advent 1970 (13 December) by Launcelot Fleming, Bishop of Norwich, and ordained a priest the Michaelmas following (26 September 1971) by William Llewellyn, Bishop of Lynn – both times at Norwich Cathedral; he was then a curate in the Hilborough group of parishes in the Diocese of Norwich from 1970 to 1973. From 1973 to 1976 he was priest-in-charge of Preston-on-Stour with Whitchurch and of Atherstone on Stour in the Diocese of Coventry. For the next 11 years he was the vicar of Preston-on-Stour and Whitchurch with Atherstone and also canon theologian of Coventry Cathedral. From 1973 to 1982 he was chaplain of the Arthur Rank Centre and its director from 1983 to 1988.

From 1983 to 1988 Russell served as a chaplain to Elizabeth II. In 1987, he was nominated as Bishop Suffragan of Dorchester in the Diocese of Oxford and was consecrated on 2 February 1988 by Robert Runcie, Archbishop of Canterbury, at Westminster Abbey; before being nominated as the Bishop of Ely in 2000. Russell initiated proceedings in the church courts against the Vicar of Trumpington, Tom Ambrose. He retired on 28 February 2010.

== Works ==
Russell published a number of books, especially on the role of the church in the countryside. These included The Country Parson (1993), The Country Parish (1986) and The Clerical Profession (1980). He was a leading spokesman for the church on rural and farming matters.

== Personal life and death ==
Russell, as a keen horseman, upon appointment as area Bishop of Dorchester, changed his Oxfordshire episcopal residence in order to secure suitable stabling.

Russell died on 9 July 2025, at the age of 82.

== Other positions ==
- Member of the Rural Development Commission and was the Archbishops' Commissioner on Rural Areas.
- Vice president of the Royal Agricultural Society.
- RASE President from 2004 to 2005.
- President of the East of England Agricultural Society from 2007 to 2008.
  - He was made a fellow of the Royal Agricultural Societies in 2008.
- Governing council of Radley College.
- President of the Woodard Corporation, a federation of 44 Anglican schools in the private and maintained sectors.
- Member of the Rural Development Commission (1991–99).
- Trustee of the Rural Housing Trust (1983–2006).
- President of the Cambridgeshire Rural Community Council.
- Admitted to the House of Lords in 2007 and left upon his retirement.
- Honorary fellow of Wolfson College and St Edmund's College at Cambridge University (2000) and St Chad's College at Durham University (2007).
- Honorary fellow of Trinity College Oxford (2011)
