= London School of Theology =

British theological college

Coordinates: 51.6127°N 0.4311°W

- Former names: London Bible College
- Type: Theological seminary
- Established: 1943
- Academic affiliations: Middlesex University
- Principal: Mark J. Cartledge
- Location: London, England, United Kingdom
- Website: lst.ac.uk

The London School of Theology (LST), formerly London Bible College, is a British interdenominational evangelical theological college based in Northwood within the London Borough of Hillingdon.

== History ==
During the 1930s A. J. Vereker, secretary of the Crusaders' Union, Sir John Laing and others set up a meeting to propose a Bible college in London which would provide high quality academic training for Christian teachers in the City. The initial meeting, in May 1939, was followed by a larger one with greater representation, which set the vision and plans for the college.

Subsequent meetings that year, which included preacher Dr. D. Martyn Lloyd Jones, drew up a report which included an outline of the fundamentals of the college. It would be residential for 40 (expanding to 80) places with a possibility of including evening students. It aimed for its courses to be recognised by London University.

The 1939 outbreak of World War II put the plans temporarily on hold. The conveners resumed in early 1942 among a wider group of evangelical leaders. In October a doctrinal basis for the college was agreed. In November "The Bible College Council" was founded:

It was a nice blend of Anglicans and Freechurchmen, ordained men and lay, veterans and young blood. Foreign missions were all represented in the persons of the Rev. W. H. Aldis, the Rev. A. Stuart McNairn, D. M. Miller and F. Mitchell. Youth and home missions had their spokesmen in F. P. Wood of the National Young Life Campaign and men like Montague Goodman and F. D. Bacon. Ladies were later included - notably Mrs. Howard Hooker, Miss Irene Crocker and Miss Amy Miller.

— Harold Rowdon, London Bible College: The First Twenty-Five Years, pp. 18-19.

In March 1943, Graham Scroggie was invited to be the director of the college for the duration of the war, and to preside over teaching matters. Laing provided "generous financial help", and the council of All Nations Christian College gifted £200. In the autumn of that year, the first lectures and classes were held in Eccleston Hall, which marks "the beginning of the public activities of the college". The first faculty consisted of Ernest Kevan, L.F.E. Wilkinson (later principal of Oak Hill College) and Frank Colquhoun.

By 1944, over 300 students were enrolled, and two years later the number was up to 1,400.

In 1970 the college moved to Northwood on a campus previously occupied by the London College of Divinity (or London School of Divinity), an Anglican institution. The 1990s saw the opening of a new postgraduate centre, the Guthrie Centre, which had formerly housed the Centre for Islamic Studies.

Between 1962 and 1997 the College published its own journal, Vox Evangelica, which ran for 27 volumes. It was edited by Ralph P. Martin (1962-1964), Donald Guthrie (1962, 1965-1980), Harold H. Rowdon (1981-1991) and Anthony Billington (1992-1997). The majority of the early articles were written by members of the faculty.

In 2004 the name of the college was changed to the London School of Theology.

== Staff members ==
Its faculty has included New Testament scholars Donald Guthrie, R. T. France, Ralph P. Martin and Max Turner as well as Derek Tidball, a practical theologian and sociologist of religion. LST also had strong connections with the Anglican theologian John Stott, an important supporter and former council member of the college.

== Principals ==
- 1946–1965 – Ernest Kevan
- 1966–1980 – Gilbert Kirby
- 1980–1989 – Michael Griffiths
- 1989–1995 – Peter Cotterell
- 1995–2007 – Derek Tidball
- 2007–2008 – Anna Robbins (acting)
- 2008–2010 – Simon Steer
- 2010–2012 – Chris Jack (acting)
- 2012–2016 – No principal, senior leadership team model used
- 2017–2019 – Calvin Samuel
- 2019–2019 – Graham Twelftree (acting)
- 2019–present – Mark J. Cartledge

== Presidents ==
- 2014 – June 2016: Krish Kandiah

== Notable alumni ==
- Jeremy Balfour
- Alistair Begg
- Clive Calver
- Ruth Edwards
- Dan Forshaw
- Graham Kendrick Honorary Doctorate
- Sheila Walsh
