= David Loveday =

David Goodwin Loveday (13 April 1896 – 7 April 1985) was an Anglican bishop during the second half of the 20th century.

He was educated at Shrewsbury School, and after World War I service with the Oxfordshire and Buckinghamshire Light Infantry he went up to Magdalene College, Cambridge. Ordained in 1924, his first posts were chaplaincies at Aldenham School and Malvern, after which he became Headmaster of Cranleigh School from 1931 to 1954. He was then appointed Archdeacon of Dorking before his elevation to the episcopate as the 3rd Bishop suffragan of Dorchester in 1957. Retiring after 14 years, he continued to serve the Church as an assistant bishop within the Diocese of Oxford until his death.

Church of England titles
Preceded by Kenneth Riches	Bishop of Dorchester; 1957–1972	Succeeded by Peter Walker
