= Martin Breadmore =

Church of England archdeacon

Martin Christopher Breadmore (born 1967) has been the archdeacon of Dorking in the Church of England since November 2019.

Breadmore was educated at City of London Freemen's School in Ashtead, Surrey, then London University and ordained in 1994. He served as a curate in Herne Bay from 1993 to 1997, when he moved to St Paul, Camberley. Whilst in Camberley, he was chaplain to Elmhurst Ballet School.

In 2010, Breadmore was appointed Director for Ministry for the Kensington Area of the Diocese of London. He became archdeacon of Dorking in 2019.

== Styles ==
- The Reverend Martin Breadmore (1994–2019)
- The Venerable Martin Breadmore (2019–present)
