= Kenneth Evans (bishop of Dorking) =

Kenneth Dawson Evans (7 November 1915 – 29 June 2007) was the second suffragan bishop of Dorking in Guildford, Surrey, England.

Evans was educated at Dulwich College and Clare College, Cambridge. Ordained in 1938, he began his career with a curacy at St Mary Northampton and was then rector of Ockley before beginning a long ecclesiastical association with the Dorking area. From 1949, he was initially vicar, then archdeacon before ascending to the episcopate – a post he held from 1968 until 1986. In retirement, he continued to minister as an assistant bishop within the Guildford Diocese.

Church of England titles
Preceded by Interregnum	Bishop of Dorking; 1968–1986	Succeeded by David Peter Wilcox
