= Christopher Herbert =

British Anglican bishop (born 1944)

The Right Reverend Christopher Herbert
- Bishop of St Albans
- Church: Church of England
- Diocese: Diocese of St Albans
- Term ended: 1996 – 2009 (retired)
- Predecessor: John Taylor
- Successor: Alan Smith
- Other post: Archdeacon of Dorking (1990–1995)

Orders
- Ordination: 1967
- Consecration: 17 November 1995

Personal details
- Born: 7 January 1944 (age 82) Lydney, Forest of Dean, England
- Denomination: Anglican
- Profession: Teacher
- Education: University of Wales, Lampeter; Wells Theological College; University of Bristol; University of Leicester

Member of the House of Lords
- Lord Spiritual
- Bishop of St Albans; 8 December 1999 – 7 January 2009

Christopher William Herbert (born 7 January 1944) is a British Anglican bishop. From 1996 to 2009, he was the Bishop of St Albans.

== Early life and education ==
Herbert was born on 7 January 1944, in Lydney in the Forest of Dean. His father helped run the family road haulage business, but was also very proud of his roots as a foundryman in a local iron works.

Herbert was educated at Monmouth School and went on to read Biblical Studies and Philosophy at the University of Wales, Lampeter. He studied for the ordained ministry at Wells Theological College, and also obtained a Postgraduate Certificate in Education at the University of Bristol. He later obtained a PhD from the University of Leicester in 2008.

== Ordained ministry ==
Herbert was ordained in 1967 and from 1967 to 1971 was Assistant Curate at St Paul's, Tupsley, Hereford, and Assistant Master at the Bishop's School in Tupsley. From 1971 to 1976 he was Adviser in Religious Education, and from 1976 to 1981 Director of Education, for the Diocese of Hereford. From 1981 to 1990 he was Vicar of St Thomas on the Bourne, near Farnham, Surrey. He was appointed Director of Post-Ordination Training and honorary canon of Guildford Cathedral before becoming Archdeacon of Dorking in 1990.

=== Episcopal ministry ===
Herbert became Bishop of St Albans in 1995: he was consecrated a bishop by George Carey, Archbishop of Canterbury, at Southwark Cathedral on 17 November 1995; and was enthroned and installed at St Albans Cathedral on 20 January 1996. During his tenure as a diocesan bishop, he served as chairman of The Council of Christians and Jews and was a member of a Lords' select committee that considered a private member's bill pertaining to euthanasia and assisted suicide. During this time he was awarded honorary doctorates by the Universities of Hertfordshire and Bedfordshire.

Herbert retired from his post as Bishop of St Albans on 7 January 2009 – his 65th birthday.

== Publications ==
- The new creation: a dramatic project for integrated studies (Religious Education Press, 1971) ISBN 0-08-016601-6
- A place to dream – a new way of looking at churches and cathedrals, with John Hencher (Church Information Office, 1976) ISBN 0-7151-0352-0
- St Paul's: a place to dream – a new way of looking at St Paul's Cathedral (Friends of St Paul's, 1982) ISBN 0-902566-01-6
- The Edge of Wonder (anthology) (Church Information Office, 1981) ISBN 0-7151-4750-1
- Listening to children: a fresh approach to religious education in the primary years, with Mary Ellison (Church Information Office, 1983) ISBN 0-7151-0412-8
- On the Road (Beginnings) (Bible Society, 1984) ISBN 0-564-07053-X
- Be Thou My Vision: Diary of Prayer (Collins, 1985) ISBN 0-00-599888-3
- This Most Amazing Day (anthology) (Church House Publishing, 1986) ISBN 0-7151-0431-4
- The Question of Jesus, with Colin Alves and Alan Dale (Church House Publishing, 1987) ISBN 0-7151-0434-9
- Alive to God (Collins, 1987) ISBN 0-00-599998-7
- Ways into Prayer (Church House Publishing, 1987) ISBN 0-7151-0445-4
- Help in Your Bereavement (Collins, 1988.) ISBN 0-00-599971-5
- Prayers for Children (anthology) National Society, 1993) ISBN 0-7151-4816-8
- Pocket Prayers (anthology) (Church House Publishing, 1993) ISBN 0-7151-4039-6
- The Prayer Garden: an anthology of children's prayers (HarperCollins, 1994) ISBN 0-551-02812-2
- Words of Comfort (anthology) (National Society/Church House Publishing, 1994) ISBN 0-7151-4941-5
- A Little Prayer Diary (republication of Be Thou My Vision) (HarperCollins, 1996) ISBN 0-00-628019-6
- Pocket Prayers for Children (anthology, illustrated by Christina Forde) (National Society/Church House Publishing, 1999) ISBN 0-7151-4911-3
- English Easter Sepulchres: the history of an idea (PhD thesis). University of Leicester. 2007. hdl:2381/7769.
- Pocket Prayers: the classic collection (anthology) (Church House Publishing, 2009) ISBN 0-7151-4193-7
- Pocket Prayers for Commuters (anthology) (Church House Publishing, 2009) ISBN 0-7151-4194-5
- Foreshadowing the Reformation: Art and Religion in the 15th Century Burgundian Netherlands (Routledge, 2016) ISBN 978-1-138-68744-8
