= Stephen Sizer =

British priest (born 1953)

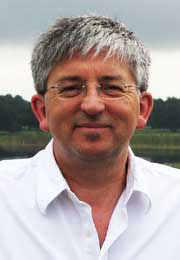
- Born: 27 July 1953 (age 73); Lowestoft, England
- Education: Sussex University, Trinity College, Bristol, Oxford University, Oak Hill College
- Occupation: Anglican priest
- Known for: Opposition to Christian Zionism

Ecclesiastical career
- Church: Church of England
- Ordained: 1983
- Congregations: Christ Church, Virginia Water, Surrey
- Title: Reverend
- Website: sizers.org

Stephen Robert Sizer (born 27 July 1953) is a priest in the Church of England. From 1997 to 2017, he was vicar of Christ Church, Virginia Water, in Surrey.

Sizer is known for online postings promoting Israel-related conspiracy theories. In October 2012, the Board of Deputies of British Jews lodged a complaint against Sizer with the Church of England under the Clergy Discipline Measure alleging that he had made antisemitic statements and published links to antisemitic web sites. Although he did not admit culpability, at a conciliation meeting in October 2013 Sizer agreed to have his online web usage monitored.

In 2015, the Board of Deputies lodged a further complaint against Sizer, this time for posting a link accusing Jews and Israel of responsibility for the 9/11 attacks in the United States. He was censured by the Bishop of Guildford, who imposed a complete ban on Sizer's use of all social media for at least six months.

In 2022, a Church of England tribunal found that his conduct had been "unbecoming to the office and work of a clerk in Holy Orders, in that he provoked and offended the Jewish community" and, by posting a link in 2015 to an article that was "virulently antisemitic in its content", he had "engaged in antisemitic activity". In January 2023 Sizer was prohibited from licensed ministry in the Church of England until 2030.

== Biography ==
Stephen Sizer was born in Lowestoft in 1953, the son of a carpenter. He began his career working for the Department of Health and Social Security (1971–1973) as a supplementary benefits visiting officer in east London. From there he went on to study geography (African and Asian studies) at Sussex University, (1973–1976). While at university he became a Christian. After graduation Sizer worked as a campus director/student counsellor with Agape at the Universities of London, Liverpool and Sussex. In 1980, he was accepted for training as a minister in the Church of England and gained a diploma in theology at Trinity College, Bristol. In 1983, he was ordained and became an assistant curate in St Leonards-on-Sea, then was appointed rector at St John's, Stoke, Guildford in 1986. He gained an MA in Theology from Oxford University in 1994.

He continued his formal studies and completed a PhD at Oak Hill Theological College (a "biblical training" college for Church of England vicars, accredited by Middlesex University) in 2003.

In 1997 he became the vicar of Christ Church, Virginia Water, where he was incumbent until Easter Sunday 2017, when he retired, relocated to the Southampton area and founded a charity, Peacemaker Trust.

== Career and opinions ==
Sizer was a Conservative Evangelical. He has been a member of Reform and the Church Society. He has endorsed the Jerusalem Declaration issued by the Global Anglican Future Conference and joined the resulting Fellowship of Confessing Anglicans.

In 2004, Sizer adapted his PhD thesis into a book, Christian Zionism – Road Map to Armageddon? He argues that Christian Zionism has led millions of Christians astray.

Sizer says that Christian Zionism has no biblical foundation or historical precedent. He writes that his motivation lies in the conviction that ignoring or stereotyping Palestinian Christians is a contradiction of faith and immoral before God. He suggests that "it is irresponsible to believe that God will bless Christians materially if they support the largely secular State of Israel".

=== Christian and Jewish responses ===
Sizer's book, Christian Zionism: Road Map to Armageddon? was commended by some Christians who embrace covenant theology, such as John Stott (Stott's essay "The Place of Israel" is included in Sizer's book Zion's Christian Soldiers?), Gary M. Burge, Gilbert Bilezikian, and Paul Copan.

Some reviews of Road Map to Armageddon? have been highly critical. A Christian opponent of Sizer, Bible teacher David Pawson, wrote a book Defending Christian Zionism - in response to Stephen Sizer and John Stott. Pawson has said of Sizer: "I am grateful to Stephen Sizer for drawing attention to the legitimate criticisms of dispensational Zionism. He has rendered a service to the cause of Zionism which was needed." Pawson debated with Sizer on Premier Christian Radio.

Other Christian authors who have criticised Sizer include Barry Horner and Paul Wilkinson, leaders of Christian missions to the Jewish people such as Mike Moore (General Secretary of Christian Witness to Israel) and Tony Higton. Later, having met Sizer, Tony Higton largely retracted his view and wrote:

Sizer is right to criticize the serious failings of some Christian Zionism. I agree with him in rejecting the following errors which are held by many Christian Zionists: Lack of godly compassion for the Palestinians, and of concern for their human rights and about their legitimate aspirations. A negative attitude toward Palestinians, and Arabs in general, to the point of racism. Uncritical support for Israel (a secular, sinful state like any other), justifying all its actions against the Palestinians.

British journalist Melanie Phillips has criticised Sizer and has condemned him in her writings. The historian Geoffrey Alderman has also criticized Sizer, accusing him of masking his "religious prejudices" in "academic guise." Jewish converts to Christianity such as Aaron Abramson and Jacob Prasch have disagreed with Sizer's views.

=== Allegations of antisemitism and misconduct (2012) ===
Sizer was accused in 2012 of linking from his Facebook profile to an article on an anti-Jewish American site espousing Holocaust denial called The Ugly Truth, which features cartoons celebrating Holocaust deniers and states that Israel is responsible for the wars in Iraq and Afghanistan. Sizer deleted the link in January 2012 after The Jewish Chronicle pointed out the link to him, reputedly two months after he had first been informed of the problem.

After complaints about his link to The Ugly Truth, Sizer's diocesan bishop, Christopher Hill, defended him. Hill believed posting the link could have been an accident, and insisted that Sizer "repudiates anti-Semitism and Holocaust denial" and was just drawing attention to an article about potential military action by Israel against Iran. After referring to Sizer's Facebook post, Nick Howard asserted in an article for the Standpoint issue of January–February 2012 that, given Sizer's statements on Press TV and elsewhere, the link made on his Facebook page is not an isolated, or "uncharacteristic", incident.

Several prominent people wrote to the Bishop of Guildford, Christopher Hill, in Sizer's defence. Amongst them was Dan Cohn-Sherbok, emeritus professor of Judaism at Aberystwyth University, who wrote, "I have been disturbed to read about the allegations made against Stephen Sizer. These are, I believe, completely without foundation: there is simply no evidence that he is an antisemite. It would be a mistake ... to construe Stephen Sizer's political criticisms as evidence of antipathy against Jews." The then-backbench Labour Member of Parliament Jeremy Corbyn wrote to Andrew Hill, Sizer's bishop, around April 2012. In his letter, Corbyn described Sizer's link as being "a technical oversight" and that those criticising Sizer were politically motivated and were "intent on discrediting the excellent work that Stephen does in highlighting the injustices of the Palestinian Israeli situation". They were, wrote Corbyn, "part of a wider pattern of demonising those who dare to stand up and speak out against Zionism".

The Board of Deputies of British Jews formally complained to the Church of England in late October 2012 over Sizer's actions since early 2010, under the terms of the Clergy Discipline Measure 2003. The complaint listed 10 incidents which the Board stated were antisemitic. These included statements made by Sizer, or material he had passed to his contacts. In addition to The Ugly Truth, they stated that he had linked to the Veterans Today website, and the Window into Palestine website which features an image of a Nazi flag with a swastika superimposed on the Star of David. The complaint stated in part: "we will not remain quiet in the face of actions and remarks capable of being seen as antisemitic even where they are disguised as anti-Zionist attacks on Israel".

A meeting took place with the Board of Deputies in October 2013. Jonathan Arkush, then vice-president of the Board of Deputies, told the BBC: "The thing that we did was to criticise him for publishing materials that were anti-semitic and anti-Jewish. Israel doesn't come into it". Sizer himself described the meeting as "very healthy" and accepted the comments from the Board of Deputies but did not regret what he had said.

=== Later allegations of antisemitism and misconduct (2014–2022) ===
In September 2014, by the invitation of Hamed Ghashghavi the secretary for international affairs of the "Second New Horizon Conference" Sizer attended the event in Tehran where 9/11 conspiracy theories such as "Zionist Fingerprints on the 9/11 Cover-up" and "9/11 and the Holocaust as pro-Zionist 'Public myths'" were under discussion. Sizer himself spoke in the Israel lobby in England session. Sizer said he was present at the conference as an "ambassador for reconciliation". According to him, the conference was anti-Zionist rather than antisemitic, and he disagreed with many of the speeches which were delivered.

Dave Rich of the Community Security Trust, a charity which monitors antisemitism in Britain, queried whether Sizer was still honouring the conciliation agreement he had made with the Jewish community. A spokesman for the British Board of Deputies said that attending "such a hate-filled event is irreconcilable with his position as a minister in the Church of England".

A few months later, on 20 January 2015 at 9.17 pm, Sizer posted a link on his Facebook page to a 9/11 conspiracy theory article entitled "9-11/Israel did it" on the WikiSpooks website. He asked in his posting: "Is this anti-Semitic? If so, no doubt I'll be asked to remove it. It raises so many questions". Sizer clarified that he "never believed Israel or any other country was complicit in the terrorist atrocity of 9/11, and my sharing of this material was ill-considered and misguided." Sizer removed the post at the request of the Board of Deputies, who said it was "unquestionably anti-Semitic". In correspondence with Jewish News online, he asked that evidence be provided to refute the conspiracy theory. After he removed the posting, Sizer continued to insist that it was "encouraging debate".

On 29 January 2015, the Church of England said in a statement that the comments made by Sizer were unacceptable and that the Diocese of Guildford would launch an investigation. On 30 January 2015, Sizer issued a statement of apology and announced that the diocese had suspended him from all social media and blogs. The Board of Deputies also published a statement condemning Sizer's behaviour.

On 9 February, it emerged that Sizer had been banned from social media by the new Bishop of Guildford, Andrew Watson, for at least six months for the Facebook post alleging Israeli responsibility for the 9/11 atrocities. He was also banned from commenting on issues relating to the Middle East, and from attending conferences on the subject. In his letter to the bishop, Sizer accepted that he would have to resign his ministry if he were to break the undertaking he had made.

The Church Times reported the bishop as saying that disciplinary action against Sizer had been considered, but an alternative approach was taken in order to resolve the matter quickly. The Board of Deputies praised the church for taking swift action, and hoped that good relations could be restored.

In October 2016, Sizer attended a meeting organised by Palestine Return Centre at the House of Lords chaired by Baroness Jenny Tonge, which gained negative media attention for comments made during the session. He wrote about the event online, thus breaking the agreement he had made. In a statement, Andrew Watson, Bishop of Guildford, said any further such incident would lead to "his tenure of office ending with immediate effect".

Sizer left his Christ Church post at Easter 2017. Just before his retirement, he again broke the terms of the agreement he had made by posting about the Middle East on Facebook.

=== 2022 tribunal ===
In May 2022, a Bishop's Disciplinary Tribunal for the Diocese of Winchester hearing was held at St Andrew's Church, Holborn, London with eleven accusations being made against Sizer for antisemitism and causing profound offence to Jews occurring from 2005 to 2017. Ecclesiastical disciplinary tribunals have previously been held in private, but Sizer exercised his right for the hearing to be held in public with the media having access. Sizer denied the claims of antisemitism and misconduct arguing his actions were against the state of Israel rather than Jews. The tribunal's finding, published in December 2022, was that Sizer's conduct was "unbecoming or inappropriate to the office and work of a clerk in Holy Orders within section 8(1)(d) of the Clergy Discipline Measure 2003 in that he provoked and offended the Jewish community and/or engaged in anti-Semitic activity". The tribunal wrote that "For the Tribunal to reach the conclusion that he was antisemitic, it would be contrary to all that the Respondent has said or written and what others have said on his behalf. It does conclude, however, that by posting the link to the Facebook page in January 2015, he was engaged in antisemitic activity." Sizer accepted the tribunal's "conclusions and the criticisms of my conduct, and apologise unreservedly for the hurt and offence caused." Mondoweiss reported that Sizer's barrister, Stephen Hofmeyr KC, later stated that “It is significant that not one word or statement from Dr Sizer has been shown to be antisemitic. There are none.”

On 30 January 2023 the penalty judgment of the Bishop's Disciplinary Tribunal was published; "The penalty of prohibition until December 2030 reflects the seriousness of the misconduct found by the Tribunal." The Archbishop of Canterbury, Justin Welby, was quoted as saying "It is clear that the behaviour of Stephen Sizer has undermined Christian-Jewish relations, giving encouragement to conspiracy theories and tropes that have no place in public Christian ministry and the church. I renew my call for the highest possible standards among ordained ministers of the Church of England in combatting antisemitism of all kinds."

Mondoweiss reported that the verdict was criticised by Jeff Halper, Jewish Voice for Labour and the Jewish Network for Palestine. Antony Lerman tweeted: "This disgraceful miscarriage of justice against someone who has never uttered a word of hate against Jews will be a permanent stain on the Church of England and the Board of Deputies."

=== Other public roles ===
Sizer is the founder and director of the Peacemaker Trust, a registered charity since 2017.

Sizer is a member of the executive of the Guildford Diocesan Evangelical Fellowship and a member of Guildford Diocesan Synod. He is a trustee and former chairman of the International Bible Society UK, publishers of the New International Version. He is a founding member of the Institute for the Study of Christian Zionism, a member of the Advisory Council of Evangelicals for Middle East Understanding, a trustee of the Amos Trust and on the UK Board of Reference for the Mar Elias Educational Institutions in I'billin, Israel. He is also on the editorial board of Living Stones Magazine.

Sizer has contributed articles for publications such as Evangelicals Now, Third Way, The Plain Truth and Friends of Al Aqsa. He has been a contributor to programmes on Premier Christian Radio and the Islamic Republic of Iran Broadcasting (IRIB). He has also appeared on Syrian TV and Al Manar TV.

== Published work ==
=== Author ===
- A Panorama of the Holy Land, with Jon Arnold, Eagle, 1998, ISBN 978-0-86347-171-1
- A Panorama of the Bible Lands, with Jon Arnold, Eagle, 2002, ISBN 978-0-86347-353-1
- In The Footsteps of Jesus and the Apostles, with Jon Arnold, Eagle, 2003, ISBN 978-0-86347-583-2
- Christian Zionism: Road Map to Armageddon?, Inter-Varsity Press, 2004, ISBN 978-1-84474-050-5
- Zion's Christian Soldiers, Inter-Varsity Press, 2007, ISBN 978-1-84474-214-1

=== Contributor ===
- Holy Land Hollow Jubilee: God, Justice and the Palestinians, eds. N. Ateek & M. Prior, Melisende, 1999, ISBN 978-1-901764-09-3
- They Came and They Saw: Western Christian Experiences of the Holy Land, ed. M. Prior, Melisende, 2000, ISBN 978-1-901764-40-6
- A Third Millennium Guide to Pilgrimage to the Holy Land, ed. D. Macpherson, Melisende, 2000, ISBN 978-1-901764-30-7
- The Land of Promise: Biblical, Theological, and Contemporary Perspectives, eds. Philip Johnson & Peter Walker, Inter-Varsity Press, 2000, ISBN 978-0-8308-2659-9
- Toronto in Perspective: Papers on the New Charismatic Wave of the Mid 1990s, ed. David Hilborn, Paternoster Press, 2001, ISBN 978-1-84227-099-8
- Speaking the Truth about Zionism and Israel, ed. Michael Prior, Melisende, 2004, ISBN 978-1-901764-26-0
- Heaven on Earth: The Temple in Biblical Theology, eds. D. Alexander & S. Gathercole, Paternoster Press, 2004, ISBN 978-1-84227-272-5
- Challenging Christian Zionism, eds. Naim Ateek, Cedar Duaybis, Maurine Tobin, Melisende, 2005, ISBN 978-1-901764-42-0
- With God on Our Side

== See also ==
- Antisemitism in Christianity
- Christian Zionism in the United Kingdom
