= Reindorp =

Reindorp is a surname. Notable people with the surname include:

- David Reindorp (born 1952), British Anglican priest
- George Reindorp (1911–1990), British Anglican bishop
