= Andrew Watson (bishop) =

British Anglican bishop (1961–2026)

The Right Reverend Andrew Watson
- Bishop of Guildford
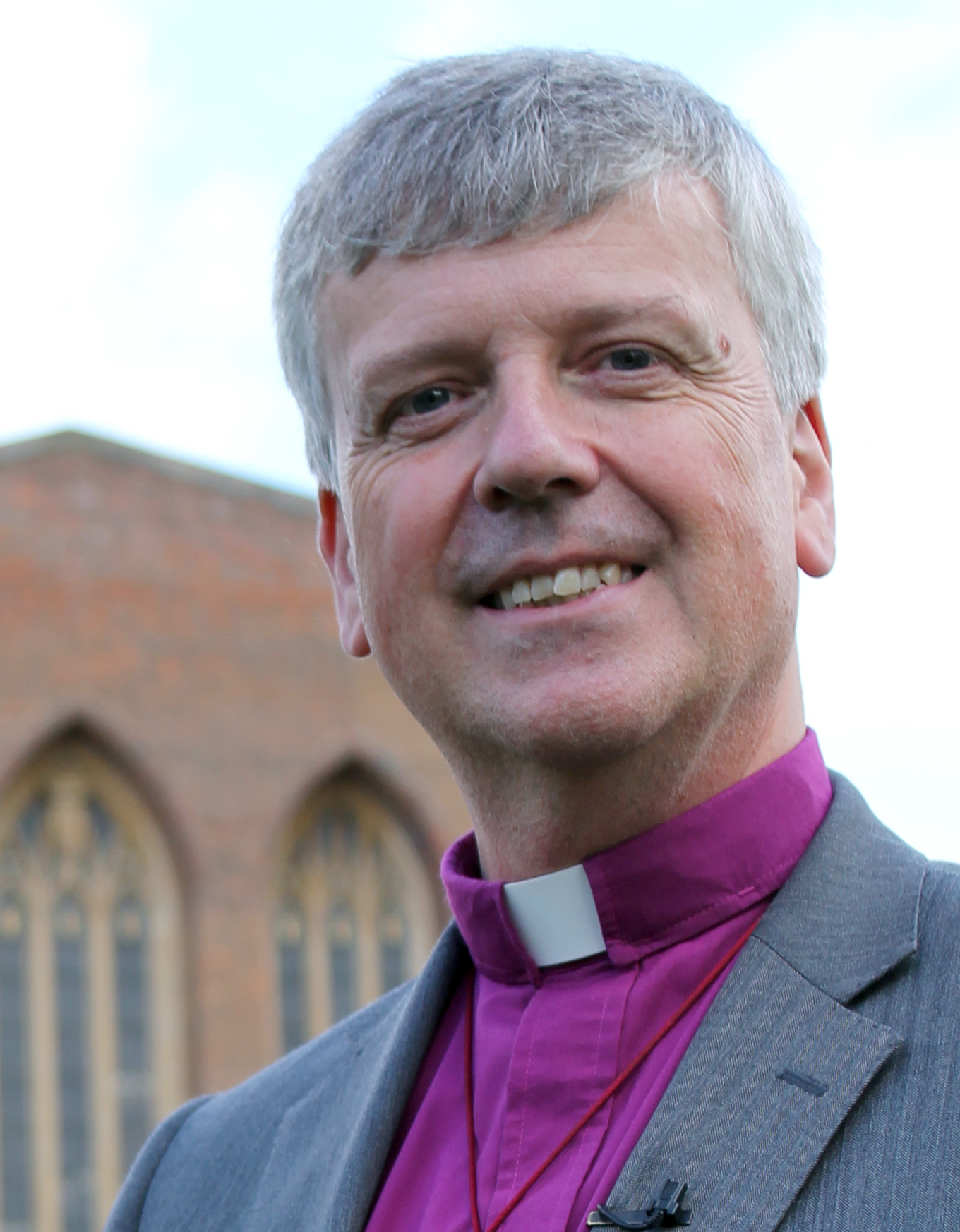
- Watson in 2014
- Church: Church of England
- Diocese: Diocese of Guildford
- In office: 2014–2026
- Predecessor: Christopher Hill
- Other post: Bishop of Aston (2008–2014)

Orders
- Ordination: 1987 (deacon); 1988 (priest) by Philip Goodrich
- Consecration: 28 October 2008

Personal details
- Born: 16 July 1961 Bicester, Oxfordshire, England
- Died: 3 March 2026 (aged 64) Surrey, England
- Denomination: Anglican
- Residence: Willow Grange, Jacobs Well
- Spouse: Beverly Watson (m. 1986)
- Children: 4
- Occupation: Anglican cleric and author
- Education: Corpus Christi College, Cambridge

Member of the House of Lords
- Lord Spiritual
- Bishop of Guildford; 9 February 2022 – 3 March 2026

Andrew John Watson (16 July 1961 – 3 March 2026) was a British religious leader who served as Bishop of Guildford in the Church of England from 2014 until his death. He had previously served as Bishop of Aston in the Diocese of Birmingham from 2008 to 2014.

== Early life and education ==
Watson was born on 16 July 1961 in Bicester, Oxfordshire, to Angus Watson, music director at Stowe School and later Winchester College, and his wife, Alison. A keen musician, he played the bassoon in the National Youth Orchestra of Great Britain from 1974 to 1976.

He was educated at Winchester College and went on to study law at Corpus Christi College, Cambridge, where he also held a music exhibition and sang in the chapel choir. He received his Bachelor of Arts degree in 1982, which was later promoted to a Master of Arts degree. Following two years working as a caretaker and youth worker at St Mary's Islington in London, he returned to Cambridge in 1984, where he completed a second degree (in theology) while training for ordination at Ridley Hall.

== Ordained ministry ==
Leaving Ridley in 1987, Watson was ordained as a deacon that Michaelmas (27 September) at St Stephen's, Redditch, and as a priest the following Petertide (3 July 1988) at Worcester Cathedral, on both occasions by Philip Goodrich, Bishop of Worcester. His first positions were curacies at St Peter's church, Ipsley, in the Diocese of Worcester (1987–1991) and at St John's & St Peter's, Notting Hill, in the Diocese of London (1991–1996). During his time in Notting Hill, he oversaw the restoration of St. Peter's, a Grade II* listed building, as well as the development of a community café on Portobello Road and a prison fellowship team at Wormwood Scrubs. Watson then moved to be Vicar of St Stephen's, East Twickenham (1996–2008), overseeing the building of the CrossWay Hall, and sending out three church planting teams to All Souls St Margarets, St. Saviours in Sunbury and the Ivybridge estate. Whilst at Twickenham, he was also Area Dean of Hampton from 2003 onwards.

=== Episcopal ministry ===
In 2008, Watson was appointed Bishop of Aston in the Diocese of Birmingham, and was consecrated as a bishop on 28 October 2008. There he designed the diocesan mission strategy, "Transforming Church", and built on the diocese's historic links with the church in Malawi. He also engaged in interfaith work, especially in response to the death of three young Muslim men in the 2011 summer riots.

On 26 September 2014, it was announced that he would be the next Bishop of Guildford. The confirmation of his election to the See of Guildford occurred on 24 November 2014, and his ministry was inaugurated at Guildford Cathedral on 28 February 2015.

Watson was introduced into the House of Lords as one of the Lords Spiritual on 9 February 2022.

=== Views ===
In 2023, following the news that the House of Bishops of the Church of England was to introduce proposals for blessing same-sex relationships, Watson signed an open letter which stated:

Many Christians in the Church of England and the Anglican Communion, together with Christians from across the churches of world Christianity, continue to believe that marriage is given by God for the union of a man and woman and that it cannot be extended to those who are of the same sex. [...] Without seeking to diminish the value of many committed same-sex relationships, for which there is much to give thanks, we find ourselves constrained by what we sincerely believe the Scriptures teach which cannot be set aside.

During the Church of England's February 2023 General Synod meeting, Watson was one of four bishops in the house to vote against the successful proposal to introduce blessings and prayers for same-sex relationships. He also voted against introducing "standalone services for same-sex couples" on a trial basis during a meeting of the General Synod in November 2023; the motion passed.

== Family and interests ==
In 1986 Watson married Beverly Woolcock, whom he had met at Cambridge. She was ordained as a deacon in 2008 and as a priest the following year. They had four children.

Watson was the author of The Fourfold Leadership of Jesus (2010), Confidence in the Living God (2009), The Way of the Desert (2011) and The Great Vocations Conversation (with Magdalen Smith, 2018). He variously chaired the CPAS Trustees, the Panel for World Mission & the Anglican Communion, and the Ordained Vocations Working Group, which oversaw a considerable rise in the number of ordained vocations over the years 2015 to 2020.

The grandson of Church Mission Society missionaries in China, Watson had a strong commitment to the global church, especially in parts of the world where Christians face discrimination and persecution. As a young adult he met with Christians behind the Iron Curtain, and later travelled to China, India, Pakistan and parts of Africa where religious extremism was on the rise. He preached at the 70th anniversary of the Church of South India in Chennai in 2017 and at the Sialkot Convention in Pakistan in 2019. On 10 November 2018, he and his wife took a walk on Longsands Beach in Tynemouth exactly 100 years after his grandfather received his call to missionary service there.

Watson wrote a setting of George Herbert's "Love Bade Me Welcome", which was sung at his consecration, and a mass for choir and organ for the 60th anniversary of the consecration of Guildford Cathedral in 2021.

In February 2015, his handling of the controversy over anti-semitic material that was shared online by Stephen Sizer was praised by the Jewish community.

In February 2017, he said that as a young man he was beaten by John Smyth.

== Illness and death ==
On 10 February 2026, Watson revealed that he had been diagnosed with inoperable pancreatic cancer. In a pastoral letter dated 20 February, he wrote: "I don't fear the prospect of dying and find to my relief that my faith in the 'resurrection of the body and the life everlasting' has only grown stronger over the past few weeks". At the end of February, about 2,000 clergy and lay people attended an all-day prayer vigil at Guildford Cathedral in a show of support for Watson.

Watson died on 3 March 2026, at the age of 64. The Bishop of Dorking, Paul Davies said that, "in the midst of the shock and sadness" of his final weeks, Watson had been an "inspiration". The Archbishop of Canterbury, Sarah Mullally, who had visited Watson at home before he died, said that he was a "man of deep Christian faith" who had made an "enormous contribution to the life of the Church of England − and ... the global Church", recalling him as a "gentle man and generous with those who held differing theological views".

Church of England titles
Vacant Title last held by John Austin	Bishop of Aston; 2008–2014	Succeeded by Anne Hollinghurst
Preceded by Christopher Hill	Bishop of Guildford; 2014–2026	Vacant
