= Christian Zionism in the United Kingdom =

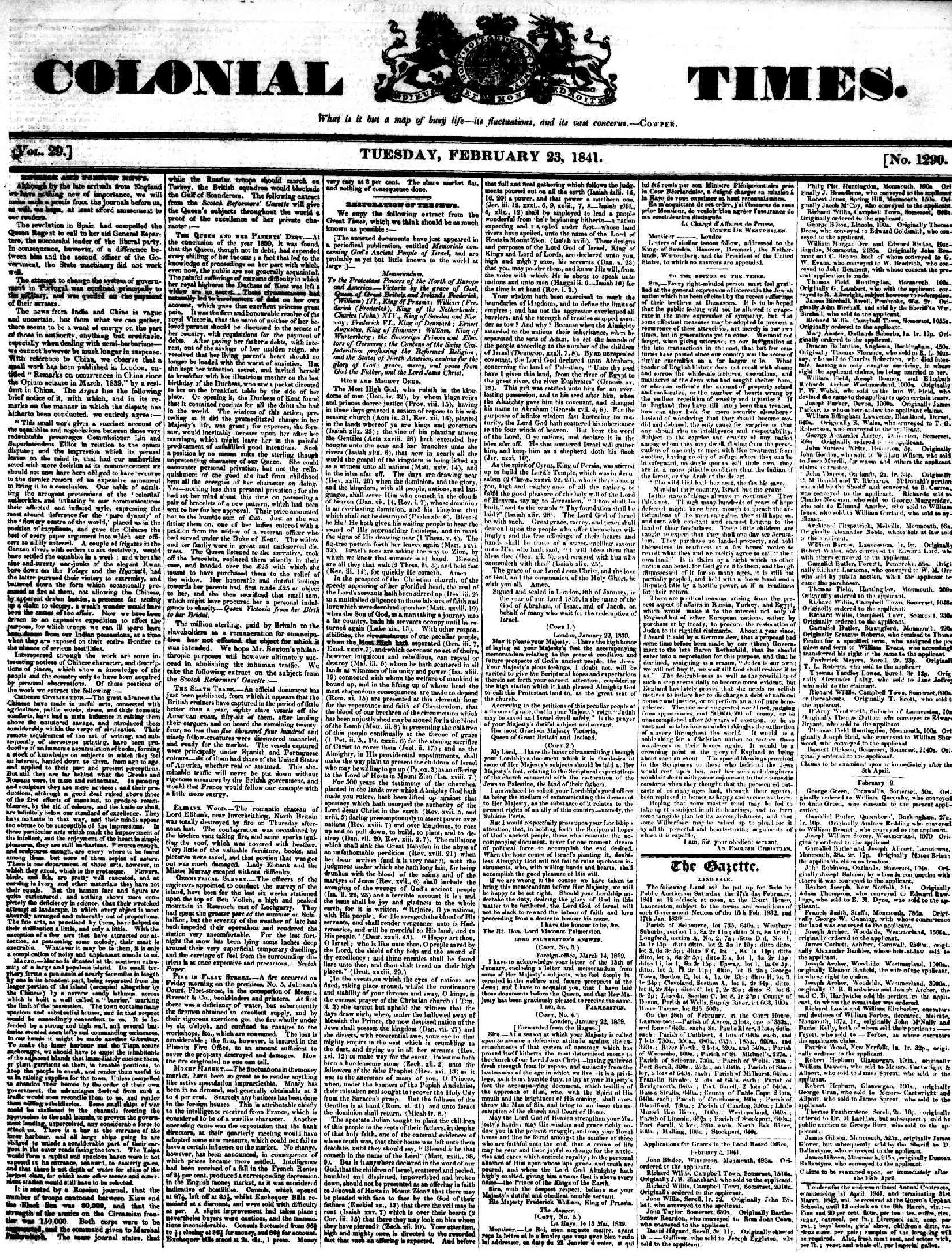
"Memorandum to the Protestant Powers of the North of Europe and America", published in the Colonial Times (Hobart, Tasmania, Australia), in 1841

Christian Zionism in the United Kingdom is a Christian ideology that sees the return of the Jews to Israel as a fulfilment of scriptural prophecy. Supporters of Christian Zionism believe that the existence of the Jewish state can and should be supported on theological grounds.

== History ==
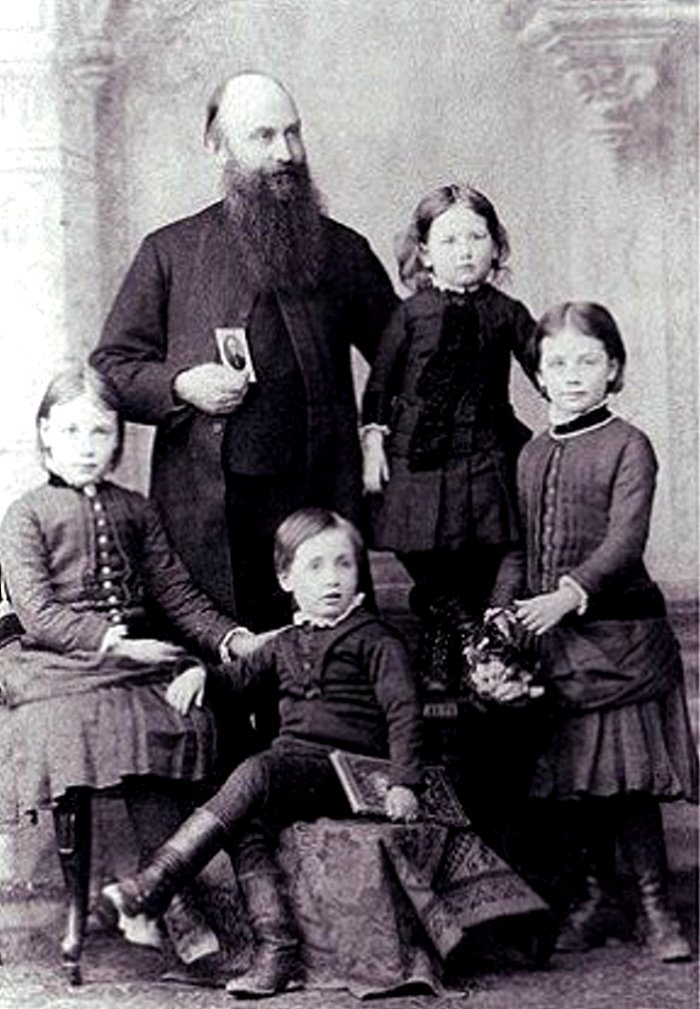
William Hechler, an 'indefatigable' supporter of Theodor Herzl

Christian Zionism preceded Zionism amongst both secular and rabbinic Jews, and much of the initiative for this came from within the United Kingdom. Expectations of a national return of the Jews to their homeland, often called Restorationism, were widely held amongst the Puritans, also heralding greater tolerance and the gradual readmission of Jews to England.

In effect, Zionism stood at the cradle of the resettlement of Jews to England.

17th century Congregationalists like John Owen, and Baptists like John Gill, and John Rippon, some 18th century Methodists and 19th century preachers like C. H. Spurgeon, Presbyterians like Samuel Rutherford, Horatius and Andrew Bonar, and Robert Murray M'Chyene, and many Anglicans including Bishop J. C. Ryle and Charles Simeon held similar views. Simeon wrote in 1820, 'the Jews at large, and the generality of Christians also, believe that the dispersed of Israel will one day be restored to their own land'

The meaning of our text, as opened up by the context, is most evidently, if words mean anything, first, that there shall be a political restoration of the Jews to their own land and to their own nationality. C. H. Spurgeon in 1864, 32 years before Herzl's Der Judenstaat.

Jewish Christians like Joseph Frey, who founded the London Society for the Jews, Joseph Wolff, and two theologians Ridley Herschell and Philip Hirschfeld formed an important link between the earlier Restorationism of German Lutheran pietists and British evangelicals, and played a large part in galvanizing widespread evangelical support in the UK. Herschell founded the British Society for the Propagation of the Gospel Among the Jews (now known as the Christian Witness to Israel) and the Evangelical Alliance in 1845. In 1840, G. W. Pieritz, another Jewish missionary for the London Society played an important role in exposing the Damascus blood libels to the British public in The Times. Erasmus Scott Calman was a Latvian Jewish Christian, resident in Jerusalem from 1833, who in 1840 also lobbied vigorously for Jewish settlement in Palestine.

Early political momentum from the 1790s to encourage and facilitate a Jewish return to Israel was doctrinally post millennial in character, being based on Puritan teaching. Influential premillennial teachers like James Frere, James Haldane Stewart and Edward Irving in the 1820s and 30s spurred a shift in widely held opinion, with equal advocacy for the restoration. The close associates Edward Bickersteth and Lord Shaftesbury were prominent premillennial proponents of Restoration, though Bickersteth did not publicly come to this view of the millennium until 1835, and both held differently nuanced views but jointly considered a return to the land would precede the receipt of spiritual life.

Perhaps the greater paradox was that Victorian England's leading Christian Zionist had been encouraged and confirmed in his restorationist views by Jewish converts who were far more zealous in the Zionist cause than most of their fellow Jews. On Lord Shaftesbury, Donald Lewis, Professor Church History, Regent College, Vancouver.

Shaftesbury repeatedly lobbied Lord Palmerston for moves to stimulate Jewish return to the Middle East, primarily by the appointment of a British Consul in Jerusalem in 1838. He also pressed for the building of Christ Church, the first place of Reformed worship in Jerusalem despite Ottoman and local opposition and the consecration in 1841 of a Jewish joint Anglican and Prussian Bishop in Jerusalem. Shaftesbury's labours paved the way for the Balfour Declaration.

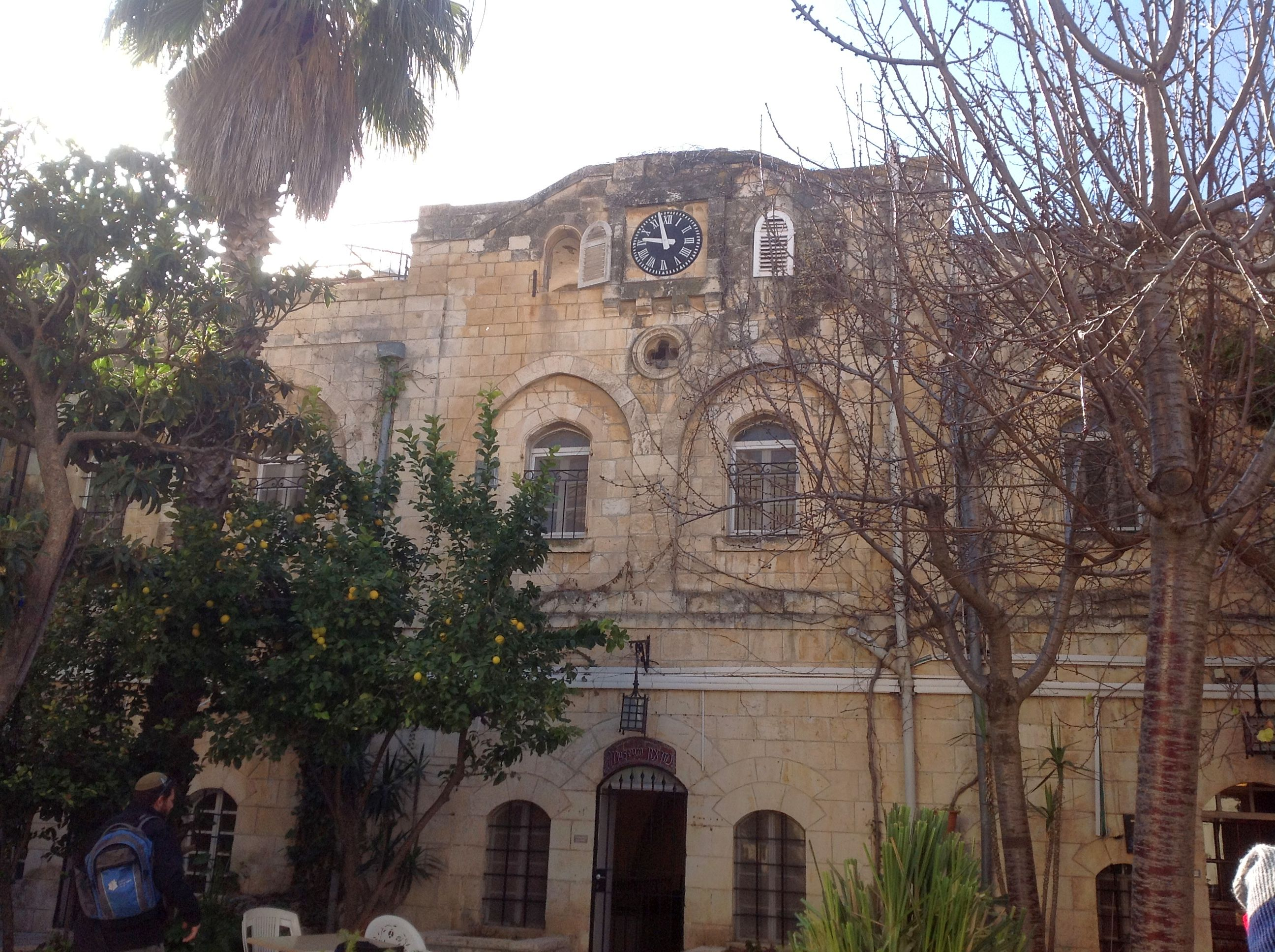
Christ Church, the first Protestant church in Jerusalem, and the result of a petition of 1,400 clergy and 15,000 laity on 18 March 1845 to Lord Aberdeen

William Hechler, an Anglican minister has been described as 'not only the first, but the most constant and the most indefatigable of Herzl’s followers'. Due to his German court connections, Hechler initially introduced Herzl to the Grand Duke of Baden, and through him hoped to present early Zionist proposals to Kaiser Wilhelm II, prompting one historian to suggest that with less German suspicion, the Zionist cause might instead have been brought to birth through its own initiative.

Christian Zionists like John Henry Patterson and Orde Wingate played crucial roles in the initiation and development of the Haganah, sometimes despite British Government opposition.

Some proponents of Christian Zionism believe that Israel must belong to the Jewish people as one of the prerequisites for the return of Jesus to earth. This eschatology has been criticized by Stephen Sizer. He and Christian Zionist David Pawson have publicly debated the issue.

In 2007, the Israeli English-language newspaper The Jerusalem Post, reported on the Jerusalem Summit Europe conference held in London, describing it as an attempt "to stem the tide of rising Islamic fundamentalism" and of moral relativism. According to the paper, the goal was to "rekindle the faded force of Christian Zionism in the United Kingdom."

== Organisations ==
Exploits Ministry is one of the London organizations which promotes Christian Zionism.

Other organisations are Christian Friends of Israel, UK, the Church's Ministry Among Jewish People (The Israel Trust of the Anglican Church), Intercessors for Britain (IFB), Prayer for Israel (PFI), Derek Prince Ministries, Christians United for Israel UK, Beit Yeshua, North East Messianic Fellowship, Bridges of Peace, C L Ministries, Evangelical Sisterhood of Mary, Hatikvah Film Trust, International Christian Embassy Jerusalem, UK, Messianic (Christian) Educational Trust, Paul Heyman International Ministries, Revelation TV, the Israel Britain Evangelistic Association and Christian Zionists for Israel UK.

== See also ==
- Anti-Zionism
- Christian eschatology
- Christian right
- Christianity and Judaism
- Dispensationalism
- Zionism
- British Israelism
- 1290 Edict of Expulsion of the Jews from England
