= Joe Fison =

74th Bishop of Salisbury

Joseph Edward Fison (18 March 1906 – 2 July 1972) was an Anglican bishop. He was the 74th Bishop of Salisbury.

== Biography ==
Fison was educated at Shrewsbury School and then at The Queen's College, Oxford, where he took second-class honours in Classical Moderations and Greats and first-class honours in the Final Honour School of Theology while training at Wycliffe Hall (though he could not take the degree of Bachelor of Arts, having already taken it for his classics degree). He graduated from the University of Oxford with a BA in 1929, MA in 1934, and BD in 1950 (a postgraduate degree awarded in recognition of his scholarship).

From 1930 until 1933 he taught at the English Mission College in Cairo and after being ordained both deacon and priest in 1934 he embarked on a clerical career that was to last nearly 40 years. He started his ordained ministry as chaplain and tutor at Wycliffe Hall before serving a curacy at St Aldate's Church, also in Oxford. With the Second World War came service in the Royal Naval Volunteer Reserve, latterly as Senior Chaplain in Jerusalem.

In peacetime he rose rapidly in the Church of England hierarchy. He held residentiary canonries at Rochester Cathedral (1945–52) and Truro Cathedral (also Sub-Dean) (1952–59) before moving to another university city, Cambridge, to be Vicar of the Great St Mary's from 1959 to 1963. Finally, he was appointed Bishop of Salisbury. Many saw the appointment of such a cultured and urbane man to such a rural diocese as Salisbury as akin to "harnessing a racehorse to a farm cart," but he proved a distinctive success. A "cultured man with some knowledge of literature", he died in office and was succeeded by George Reindorp, previously Bishop of Guildford.

== Notes ==
Church of England titles
Preceded by William Louis Anderson	Bishop of Salisbury; 1963–1972	Succeeded by George Reindorp
