= William Hechler =

English Restorationist Anglican clergyman and eschatological writer

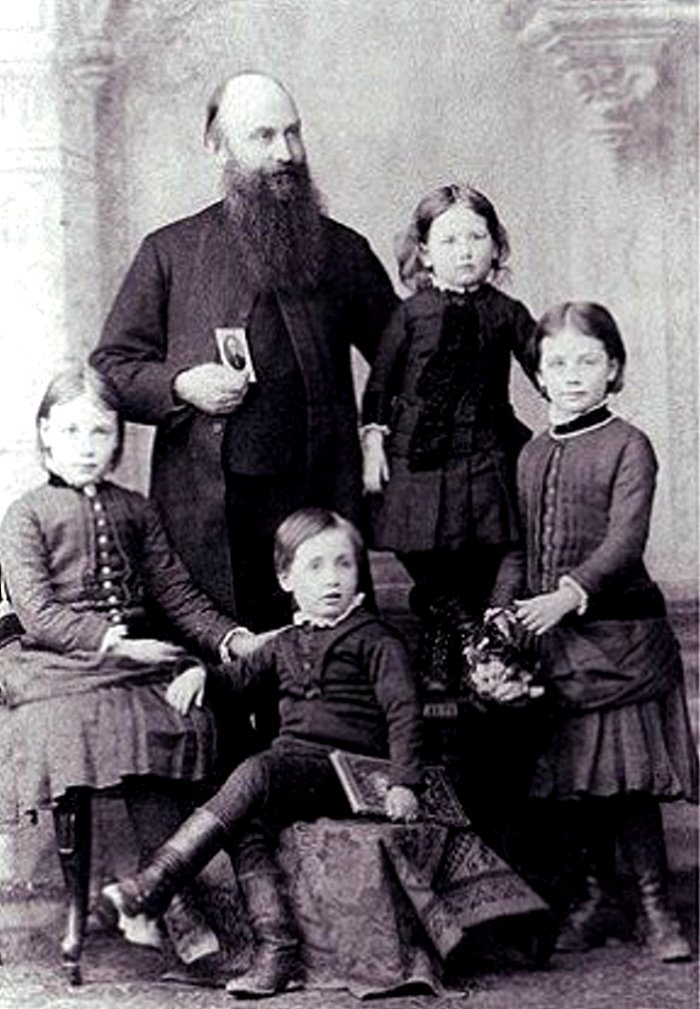
Reverend William Hechler and family

William Henry Hechler (1 October 1845 – 30 January 1931) was an English Restorationist Anglican clergyman; eschatological writer; crusader against antisemitism; promoter of Zionism; and aide, counselor, friend and endorser of Theodor Herzl, the founder of modern Zionism.

== Biography ==
William Henry Hechler was born in the Hindu holy city of Benares, India. His father was Dietrich Hechler (1812–1878) born in Vögisheim, Germany, now part of Müllheim. Dietrich moved to Islington, near London, becoming an Anglican priest, studying at an Anglican seminary in preparation for overseas missionary service. While in London, he married Catherine Cleeve Palmer. They were sent to India by the "Church Missionary Society."

After the death of his mother in 1850, Hechler attended boarding schools in London and in Basel. Hechler demonstrated a perceptive ability in religious studies and languages. His bi-national education cemented his German-English heritage. Over his lifetime he gained proficiency in English, German, Hebrew, Greek, Latin, Arabic, Italian, Spanish, Portuguese, French and two African dialects.

In 1854, Dietrich Hechler returned to London for health reasons and took a position with the London Society for Promoting Christianity Amongst the Jews. His father's Philo-Semitism deeply influenced William. The family relocated to Karlsruhe, Germany in 1866. William's interest in Jewish studies and Palestine evolved under the influence of developing European Evangelical Restorationist theology. He began developing his own eschatological theories and timelines for the Second Coming of Jesus Christ.

== Military career ==
After completing his studies at Turbingen and Islington in 1870, Hechler became an Anglican clergyman. An Anglophile as well as a Germanophile, Hechler enlisted in the German army during the Franco-Prussian War of 1870–1871. He served as a clergyman and medical aide. He was wounded and was twice decorated with distinction.

== Missionary and pedagogic work ==
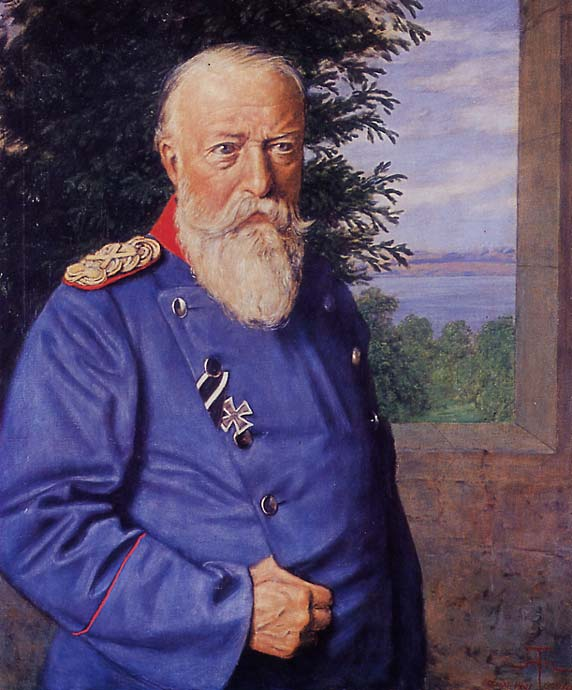
Grand Duke Friedrich I of Baden, by Hans Thoma

At the end of the war, Hechler accepted a missionary post in Lagos, Nigeria. After contracting malaria, Hechler returned to Germany, where his father did missionary work with Jews in Karlsruhe. Hechler was sufficiently recovered by 1873 that he became the household tutor to the children of Frederick I, Grand Duke of Baden. Through Friedrich's son Ludwig, Hechler developed a relationship with the Grand Duke's nephew, the young Hohenzollern prince, and later German Kaiser Wilhelm II. While at the Grand Duke's court, Hechler expounded on his Restorationist views. Hechler's Restorationist theology resonated with the Grand Duke. Prince Ludwig of Baden died prematurely in 1876. Hechler left the Grand Duke's court to accept a position in the Irish County of Cork. There he married Henrietta Huggins (d-1922). They had four children, Hannah (d-1877), Amy Victoria (1878–1961), Ludwig Ernest (1880–1972) and Miriam Ada (1882–1938). Hechler's position in Cork was not successful and he moved to London in 1879.

Hechler attempted to secure an appointment as the Anglican Bishop in Jerusalem at the Christ Church there. It was a position he desired all his life. Hechler wrote what is still considered one of the finest histories of the Protestant Church in Palestine to help obtain the position, "The Jerusalem Bishopric", 1885. Deteriorating relations between Prussia and the United Kingdom blocked his appointment. This disappointment, and corresponding spousal strains, led to his marriage failing the same year. However, he did secure an appointment as the Chaplain of the British Embassy in Vienna. Hechler remained Chaplain from 1885 to 1910.

== Early Zionist activism ==
Two years later (1881), he became "Metropolitan Secretary" of the Church Pastoral Aid Society. In his new position, he had the opportunity to expand his interest in Jewish affairs and Restorationism. In 1882, in his official capacity, he traveled to Germany, France and Russia to investigate the Jewish situations there. Hechler was particularly shocked and revolted by the violent pogroms being instituted in Russia against the Jews. Traveling through Odessa, he met the proto-Zionist, Leon Pinsker, author of Auto–Emancipation, a treatise on a Jewish solution to endemic antisemitism by the establishment of a separate State. Hechler observed emerging Zionist hopes in the Eastern Jewry.

Stopping in Constantinople, Hechler attempted to deliver, through the British Ambassador, a letter to the Sultan of Turkey from Queen Victoria of the United Kingdom. The letter, a Restorationist solution to antisemitism, called upon the Sultan to permit the Jews to return to Palestine. The British Ambassador refused to present the letter.

In 1884 Hechler wrote his own treatise, "The Restoration of the Jews to Palestine." He called for the Jews to return to Palestine as a pre-condition for the return of Jesus. Hechler wrote, "It is the duty of every Christian to love the Jews." Hechler did not believe that conversion of the Jews to Christianity was a pre-condition of their return to Palestine or for the advent of the Second Coming.

"Not only the first, but the most constant and the most indefatigable of Herzl's followers."

Hechler maintained an austere, yet eccentric, religious life as Chaplain of the British Embassy. In his private residence, he collected Bibles, maps of Palestine and constructed a scale model of the Jewish Temple that had stood in Jerusalem. He studied the Bible closely, working out timelines for the Restoration of the Jews and the Second Coming of Jesus. He predicted that in 1897 or 1898 a major event would occur that would lead to the Restoration of the Jews. In early March 1896, Hechler had been perusing the Viennese book stalls when he happened upon a book, Der Judenstaat, by Theodor Herzl. It had been published just a few weeks earlier.

== Meeting with Herzl ==
Herzl was a well known Viennese writer for the Neue Freie Presse. He had been assigned to cover the infamous Captain Alfred Dreyfus trial in Paris. Dreyfus, a Jewish French military officer, had been convicted (falsely) of selling French military secrets to the Prussians during the recent war. France erupted in spasms of antisemitism that shocked Herzl from his assimilated Jewish complacency to reconsider the realities of deeply embedded antisemitism. Herzl composed the thoughts he had been struggling with over a number of months prior to the conviction of Dreyfus and published them in a book, Der Judenstaat (The Jewish State). Herzl's solution to antisemitism was simple. If France or any country did not want Jews, the Jewish solution was to return to their ancient homeland and reestablish a Jewish State.

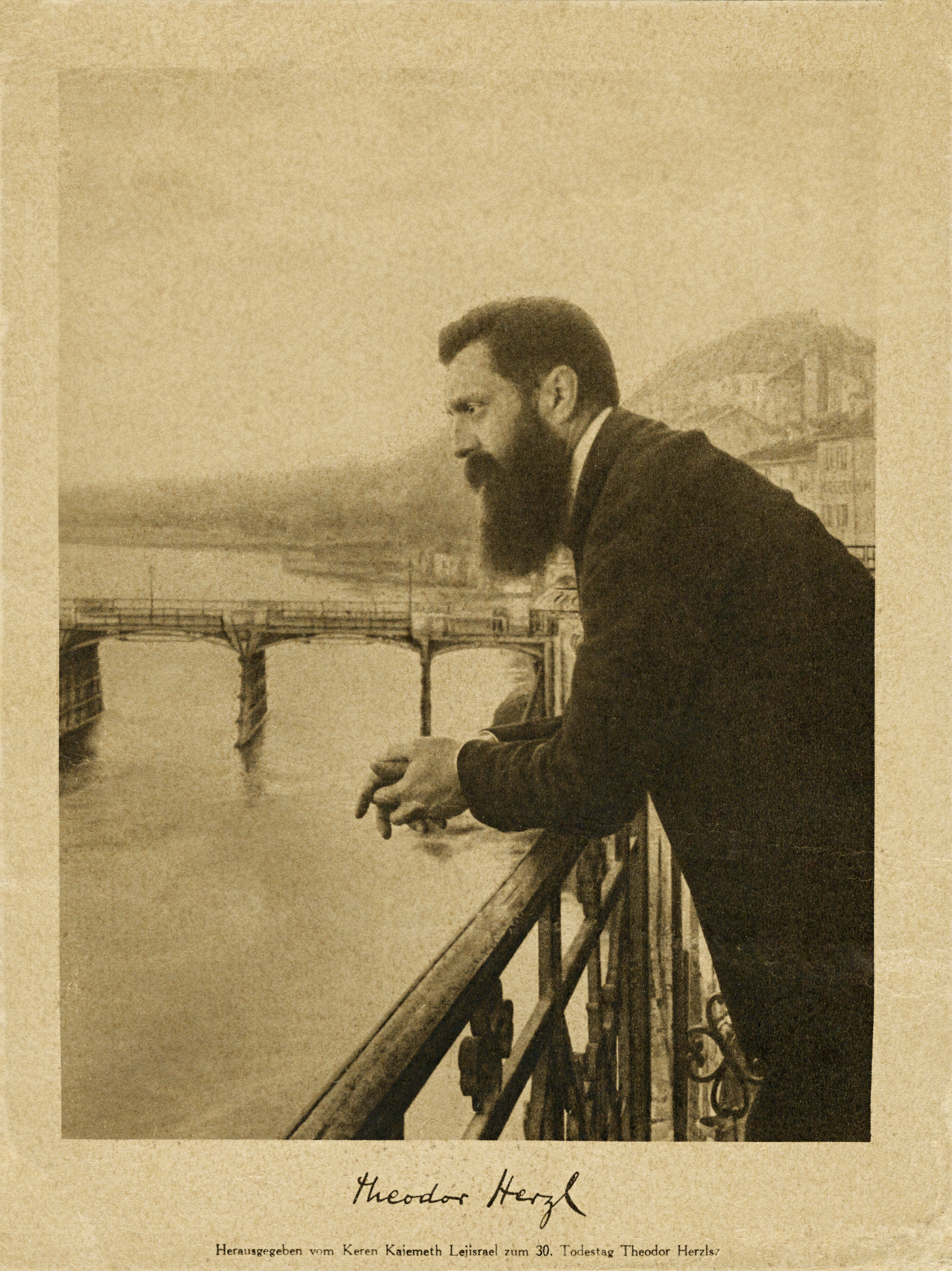
Theodor Herzl in Basel, photographed during Fifth Zionist Congress in December 1901, by Ephraim Moses Lilien.

On 10 March 1896 Herzl recorded in his diary his first meeting with Reverend Hechler.

The Rev. William H. Hechler, chaplain to the British Embassy in Vienna, called on me.

A likeable, sensitive man with the long grey beard of a prophet. He waxed enthusiastic over my solution. He, too, regard my movement as a "prophetic crisis" – one he foretold two years ago. For he had calculated in accordance with a prophecy dating from Omar's reign (637-638) that after 42 prophetical months, that is, 1,260 years, Palestine would be restored to the Jews. This would make it 1897-1898.

When he read my book, he immediately hurried to Ambassador Monson (British Ambassador in Vienna) and told him: the fore-ordained movement is here! Hechler declares my movement to be a "Biblical" one, even though I proceed rationally in all points.

He wants to place my tract in the hands of some German princes. He used to be a tutor in the household of the Grand Duke of Baden, he knows the German Kaiser and thinks he can get me an audience.

Less than a week later, Herzl went to see Hechler.

Yesterday, Sunday afternoon, I visited the Rev. Hechler. Next to Colonel Albert Goldsmid, he is the most unusual person I have met in this movement so far. He lives on the fourth floor; his windows overlook the Schillerplatz. Even while I was going up the stairs I heard the sound of an organ. The room which I entered was lined with books on every side, floor to ceiling.

Nothing but Bibles.

A window of the very bright room was open, letting in the cool spring air, and Mr. Hechler showed me his Biblical treasures. Then he spread out before me his chart of comparative history, and finally a map of Palestine. It is a large military staff map in four sheets which, when laid out, covered the entire floor. "We have prepared the ground for you!" Hechler said triumphantly.

He showed me where, according to his calculations, our new Temple must be located: in Bethel! Because that is the center of the country. He also showed me the models of the ancient Temple.

He sang and played for me on the organ a Zionist song of his composition… But I take him for a naïve visionary with a collector's enthusiasm, and I particularly felt it when he sang his songs to me.

In his diary, Herzl records his true motivation for coming to see Hechler. Herzl needed Hechler. Herzl had no access to the German Royal family and international legitimacy. He needed Hechler to help gain him entre and hence recognition by a great European power of his ideas re: Political Zionism. Herzl continued in his diary:

"Next we came to the heart of the business. I said to him: I must put myself into direct and publicly known relations with a responsible or non responsible rule – that is, with a minister of state or a prince."

"Then the Jews will believe in me and follow me. The most suitable personage would be the German Kaiser. But I must have help if I am to carry out the task. Hitherto I have had nothing but obstacles to combat, and they are eating my strength."

"Hechler immediately declared that he was ready to go to Berlin and speak with the Court Chaplain as well as with Prince Gunther and Prince Heinrich. Would I be willing to give him the travel expenses?"

"Of course I promised them to him at once. They will come to a few hundred guilders, certainly a considerable sacrifice in my circumstances. But I am willing to risk it on the prospect of speaking with the Kaiser."

"…To be sure, I think I detect from certain signs that he is a believer in the prophets. He said, for example, "I have only one scruple: namely, that we must not contribute anything to the fulfilment of the prophecy. But even this scruple is dispelled, for you began your work without me and would complete it without me."...........He considers our departure for Jerusalem to be quite imminent and showed me the coat pocket in which he will carry his big map of Palestine when we shall be riding around the Holy Land together. That was his most ingenious and most convincing touch yesterday."

Hechler left for Berlin almost immediately but failed to speak with the Kaiser. He returned with a different plan, a different path to the Kaiser. Herzl was a political neophyte and did not know what to do.

On 23 April 1896 Herzl wrote in his diaries of his arrival in Karlsruhe at Hechler's request:

"Arrived here at eleven last night. Hechler met me at the station and took me to the Hotel Germania, which had been "recommended by the Grand Duke. We sat in the dining-room for an hour. I drank Bavarian beer, Hechler milk. He told me what had happened. The Grand Duke had received him immediately upon his arrival, but first wanted to wait for his privy-councilor's report on my Jewish State."

"Hechler showed the Grand Duke the "prophetic tables" which seemed to make an impression. When the Kaiser arrived, the Grand Duke immediately informed him of the matter. Hechler was invited to the reception and to the surprise of the court-assembly the Kaiser addressed him with the jocular words: "Hechler, I hear you wanted to become a minister of the Jewish State.""

Two days later, on 25 April, Hechler brought a very nervous Herzl to a private audience with the Grand Duke. It was the first time that Herzl was able to share his vision of Political Zionism and his solution to the "Jewish Problem" with German royalty.

Frederick I, Grand Duke of Baden was very taken with Hechler's eschatological predictions and with Herzl's pragmatic solution to the Jewish problem through restoration of the Jews to Palestine. The Grand Duke became a lifelong advocate of Herzl and the Zionist cause. He used his office and his relationship with his nephew, Kaiser Wilhelm II to support Herzl and Zionism.

== Zionist political legitimacy ==
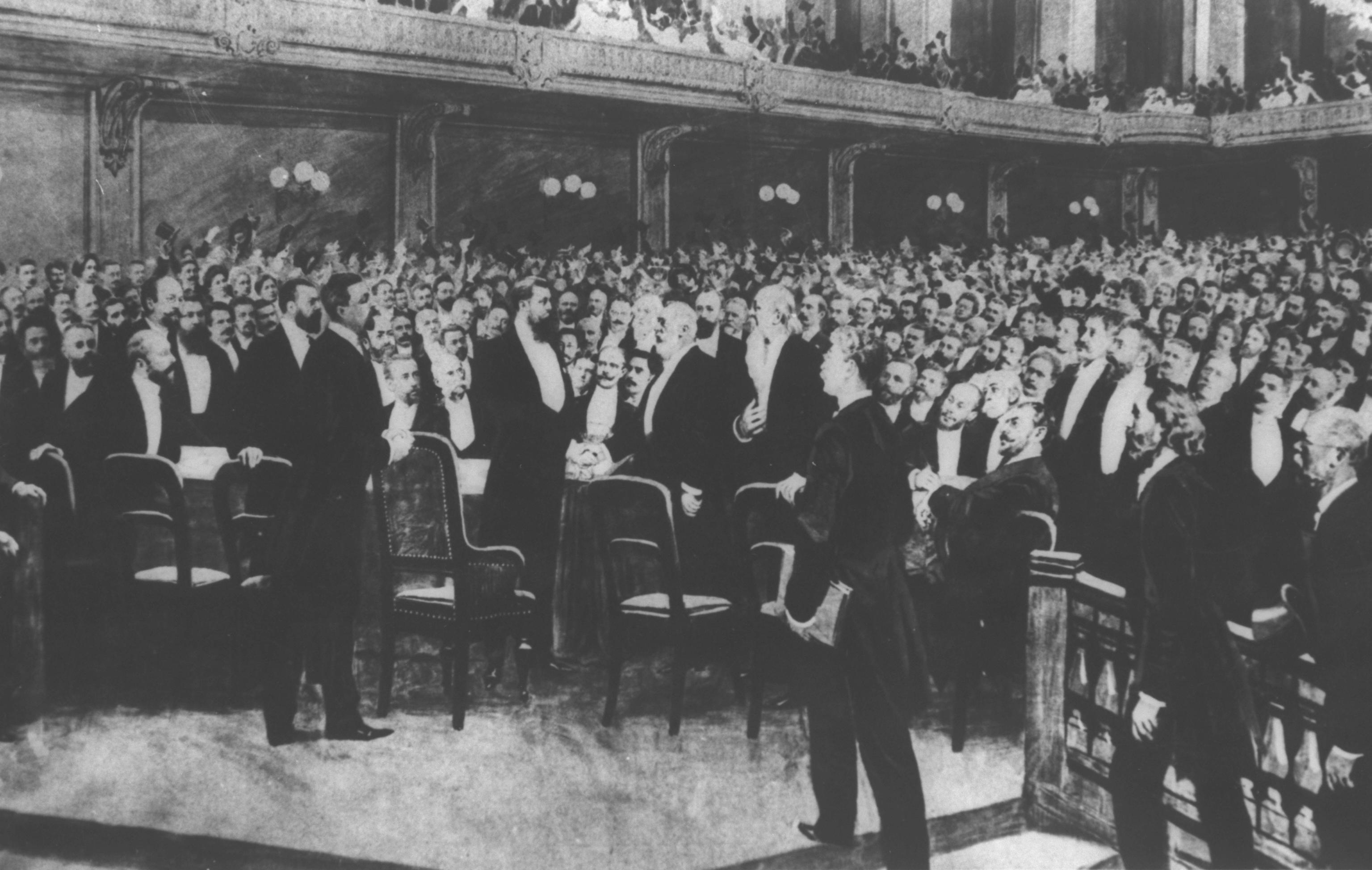
The delegates at the First Zionist Congress, held in Basel, Switzerland (1897).

=== Early meetings with Herzl ===
Throughout 1897, Hechler worked to introduce Herzl to the Christian world, speaking at every opportunity or writing to every interested clergyman. August 1897, Theodor Herzl convoked the First World Zionist Congress in Basel, Switzerland. Herzl invited Hechler to the Congress as a non-voting delegate and the "first Christian Zionist." The Zionist movement was still tiny and was not recognised as legitimate by the majority of Jews or any major European world power. Hechler continued working to secure an audience for Herzl with the Kaiser. Through the German ambassador to Austria, Philipp-Fuerst-von-Eulenburg (1847–1921), whose wife had been a student of Hechler's, Hechler arranged an introduction to the Ambassador for Herzl. Von Eulenburg was a very close personal friend of the Kaiser's.

=== Meetings with the Kaiser ===
Hechler's plans to bring Herzl before the Kaiser were coming together. The Kaiser was well apprised of Herzl and Zionism through the Grand Duke of Baden who continued his solicitations for Herzl. He was now also approached as to the political expediency of Zionism and Herzl by von Eulenburg.

During the early fall of 1898, Kaiser Wilhelm II of Germany planned a trip to Palestine to visit the German settlements there and dedicate the Lutheran Church of the Redeemer, Jerusalem. Theodor Herzl was invited to a private audience with Kaiser Wilhelm on 15 October 1898, when the Kaiser stopped in Constantinople for a State visit.

The Kaiser asked Herzl what he wished him to ask of the Sultan:

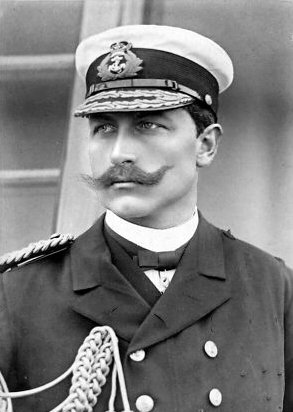
Wilhelm II, circa 1890

"Tell me in a word what I am to ask the Sultan.' "A Chartered Company – under German protection," was Herzl's request.

It would be the foundational backing and protection for the Jewish State – Herzl's and Hechler's goal.

The Kaiser brought the subject up twice with the Sultan. The Sultan refused to consider granting the Jews a charter to Palestine even in return for the Jews assuming the Turkish foreign debt.

Palestine, 29 October 1898, outside a small Rothschild funded Jewish agricultural settlement, Herzl publicly awaited the Kaiser on his way to Jerusalem. The Kaiser's and his cortege stopped to speak briefly with Herzl. It was the first public acknowledgement of Herzl as the leader of the world Zionist movement by a major European power. Photographs were taken of the event but poorly positioned so that only partials of the meeting were actually recorded. A composition of the images was made later for historical and world presentation.

On 2 November 1898 Theodor Herzl and the Zionist delegation who accompanied him, formally went to Kaiser Wilhelm's encampment outside of Jerusalem. Herzl was publicly received. At the public presentation outside of Mikveh, and in Jerusalem, Herzl realized that Kaiser Wilhelm had failed with the Sultan and no longer had interest in him or Zionism.

World perception of the German Kaiser's meeting with Herzl outside of Mikveh and in Jerusalem were the opposite of Herzl's.

The (London) Daily Mail, the most popular mass newspaper in Great Britain, wrote on Friday 18 November 1898

"An Eastern Surprise Important Result of the Kaiser's Tour Sultan and Emperor Agreed in Palestine Benevolent Sanction Given to the Zionist Movement One of the most important results, if not the most important, of the Kaiser's visit to Palestine is the immense impetus it has given to Zionism, the movement for the return of the Jews to Palestine. The gain to this cause is the greater since it is immediate, but perhaps more important still is the wide political influence which this Imperial action is like to have. It has not been generally reported that when the Kaiser visited Constantinople Dr. Herzl, the head of the Zionist movement, was there; again when the Kaiser entered Jerusalem he found Dr. Herzl there. These were no mere coincidences, but the visible signs of accomplished facts."

The perception of success and the accomplishments were different. Kaiser Wilhelm had backed away from supporting Herzl and Zionism. Herzl thought he failed. Hechler was uncertain but remained steadfast. The world press saw the events as momentous and successful. Hechler had succeeded in bringing political legitimacy to Theodor Herzl and Zionism.

Herzl returned to Vienna and asked Hechler to try to find out what had gone wrong. Hechler was never successful in determining the events. Herzl turned his attention to gaining access to the Royal House of power in Great Britain. He asked Hechler to intercede but Hechler's influence and access was to the German court. The Zionist movement under Herzl continued to evolve and grow. Eventually, Hechler would attend five Zionist Congresses as Herzl's aide and friend. Herzl never succeeded again in gaining access to the courts of power that Hechler had provided.

=== Herzl's death ===
Due to overwork, stress and preexisting medical conditions, Herzl died on 3 July 1904. He was 44. At his side the day earlier, the last non-family to be with Herzl was Reverend Hechler. Hechler recorded Herzl's last words, "Greet Palestine for me. I gave my heart's blood for my people."

Before his death Herzl had asked that the Zionist community remember and honour Hechler for all that he had done for him and Zionism.

== Later years and death ==
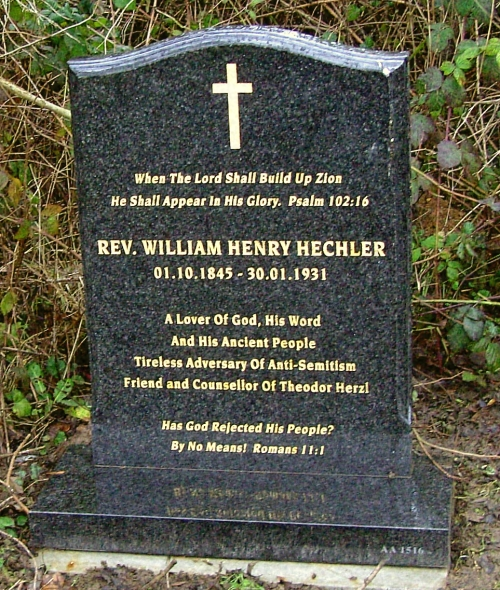
Hechler memorial

Hechler was 59 years old when Theodor Herzl died. He remained Chaplain of the British Embassy until 1910, when a new ambassador, arrived who was less tolerant of Hechler's views. Hechler retired to Great Britain. Hechler was remembered in Vienna not only for his eccentricities and his support of Zionism but for being a founding member of the First Vienna Football (Soccer) Club. In retirement, Hechler continued spreading the word about Zionism, Herzl and Restorationism. He befriended the great philosopher Martin Buber, the great portrait painter Philip de László and the head of Scotland Yard, Robert Anderson. Hechler was actively against World War I, which put an end to his romantic dream of unity between the British and German peoples. He may have met Bertha Suttner, the Austrian pacifist.

Beginning in the late 1920s the Zionist Executive provided a small monthly pension of 10 pounds to Hechler. He worked for Mildmay Hospital, in a minor clerical position, until shortly before his death in 1931. At the age of 85, he died alone, leaving the not inconsiderable sum of £1954 16s 11d in his will, living at 80 North Hill Highgate at the time. In 1934, the Jewish community of Vienna proposed a statue be erected in honour of Reverend Hechler. It was never done. Vienna, by 1934, was already rapidly on the road that would lead to National Socialism (Nazism) and the Holocaust. Austria was absorbed into Germany during the Anschluss of February 1938.

== Legacy and commemoration ==
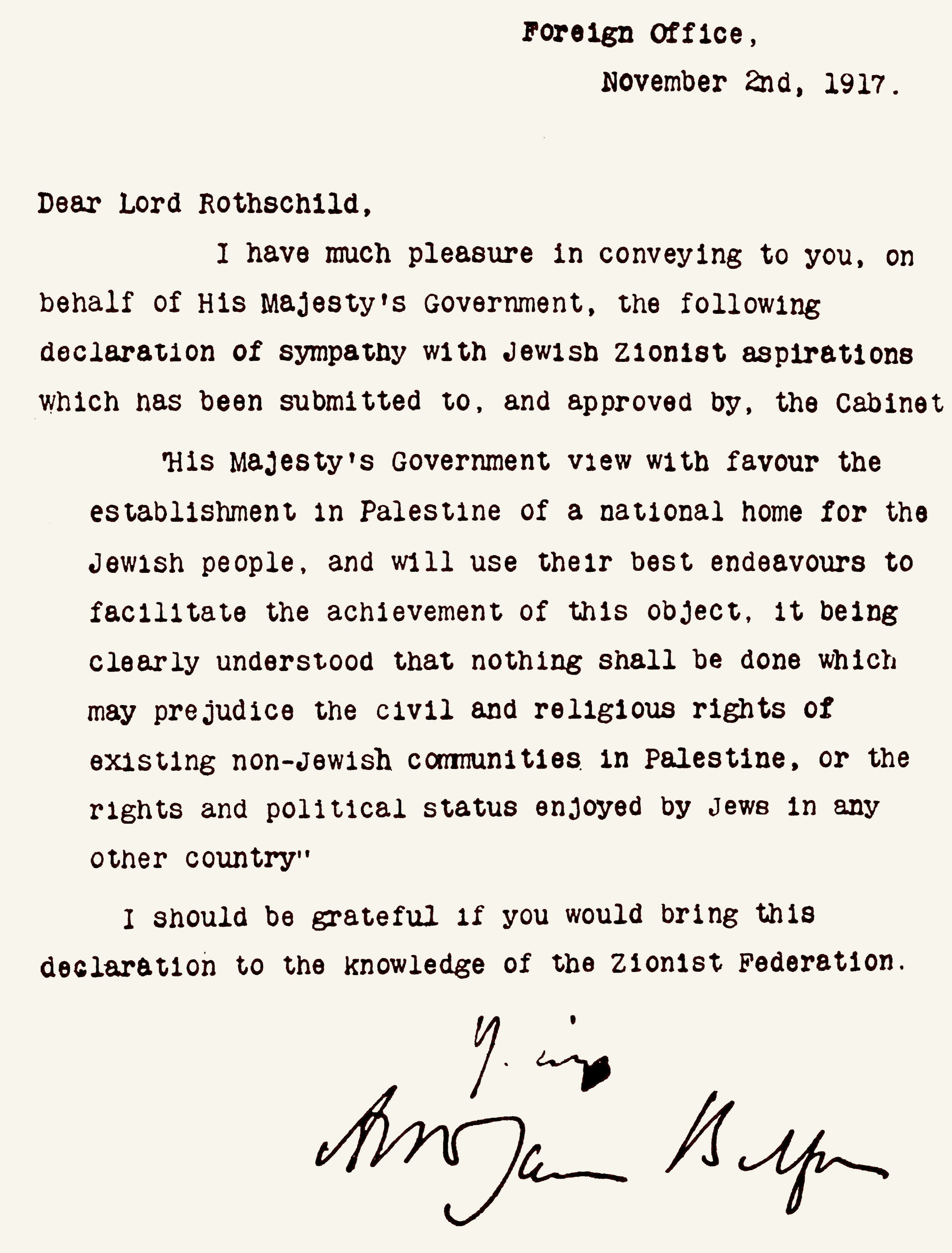
Balfour Declaration

Hechler lived to see the Political Zionist Movement of Theodor Herzl, that he had worked and succeeded in legitimizing in public opinion, given the backing of a major European world power. Hechler's predictions of a coming catastrophe for the Jewish people occurred, 6,000,000 European Jews were murdered from 1939 to 1945. Seventeen years after Hechler's passing the State of Israel came into being, in May 1948.

In 2010, the forgotten unmarked gravesite of Reverend William Henry Hechler was rediscovered in London. Led by the Jewish American Society for Historic Preservation and the British Christian Zionist Movement, an appropriate graveside memorial was erected on 31 January 2011.
