= Michael Adie =

English bishop (1929–2024)

The Rt Revd Michael Adie CBE
- Bishop of Guildford
- Diocese: Diocese of Guildford
- In office: 1983–1994
- Predecessor: David Brown
- Successor: John Gladwin
- Other posts: Archdeacon of Lincoln; 1977–1983

Orders
- Ordination: 1955
- Consecration: c. 1983

Personal details
- Born: 22 November 1929 Romford, England
- Died: 4 March 2024 (aged 94)
- Denomination: Anglican
- Spouse: Anne Devonald Roynon
- Children: Three daughters, one son; Elizabeth Devonald; Andrew Mark Devonald; Margaret Rosamond Devonald; Helen Catherine Devonald. 11 Grandchildren. 5 great grandchildren.
- Education: St John's College, Oxford

Michael Edgar Adie, CBE (22 November 1929 – 4 March 2024) was an English Anglican clergyman who was Bishop of Guildford from 1983 until his retirement in 1994.

== Biography ==
Michael Edgar Adie was born in Romford, Essex on 22 November 1929, the son of Walter Granville Adie and Kate Emily Adie (née Parrish). He was educated at Westminster School and St John's College, Oxford. He is a distant relative of the broadcaster and journalist Kate Adie.

Adie was ordained in 1955 and after a curacy at St Luke, Pallion, Sunderland he became Resident Chaplain to the Archbishop of Canterbury. After that he was Vicar of St Mark, Sheffield, Rural Dean of Hallam, Rector of Louth, and Archdeacon of Lincoln before being elevated to the episcopate.

Adie played a significant role in introducing the measure in General Synod that led to the ordination of women priests. He was Chairman of the General Synod Board of Education and was appointed a Commander of the Order of the British Empire (CBE) in the 1994 Birthday Honours for services to education.

After retiring from Guildford, he became honorary assistant bishop in the Diocese of Chichester in 1996 and, in 1995, of Portsmouth, where, in the latter diocese, he lived at Froxfield, Hampshire.

In 1957, he married Anne Devonald Roynon (1930–2013); they had three daughters and one son. Michael Adie died of pneumonia on 4 March 2024, at the age of 94.

== Notes ==
Church of England titles
Preceded by David Brown	Bishop of Guildford; 1983–1994	Succeeded by John Gladwin
