= With God On Our Side (film) =

2009 film by Porter Speakman Jr.

With God On Our Side is a 2009 film by Porter Speakman Jr. and Kevin Miller (filmmaker), the latter of whom is the co-creator of the documentary Expelled: No Intelligence Allowed. The documentary criticizes the theology behind Christian Zionism and the attitude toward the Israeli-Palestinian conflict taken by many American evangelicals, as well as the indifference by many Westerners toward the plight of Palestinian Christians. The film argues that Christians who take the Bible seriously should not "take either side" in the conflict, but rather be peacemakers and stand up for the rights of all people in the region. In the film, Palestinian Christians are interviewed and share their families' stories. Leading evangelical supporters (such as John Hagee) and critics of Christian Zionism (Stephen Sizer) are also given the opportunity to share their views.

Jürgen Bühler of the International Christian Embassy Jerusalem said that the views expressed in the film are "unfortunately colored by a strong sense of Palestinian nationalism.”

Frank Schaeffer in The Huffington Post said the film "is the most powerful, humane and compassionate documentary exposé of the Christian Zionist movement, and the impact of their ideology on the lives they have touched (and ruined), ever made. It is well crafted, subtle and fair."

The film makes use of a quote presumably from David Ben-Gurion. The source of the quote is from the revisionist historian Ilan Pappe's work The Ethnic Cleansing of Palestine, but cannot be verified from Ben-Gurion's writings as authentic, leading the producers to issue an important correction in 2011. This prompted two critics to claim the film is tendentious.
