= Guthrie Moir =

British television producer, Liberal Party politician, prominent Christian and writer

George Guthrie Moir MA (30 October 1917 – 29 November 1993), was a British television producer, Liberal Party politician, prominent Christian and writer who was one of the founders of Independent Television.

== Background ==
He was the son of James William and May Flora Moir. He was educated at Berkhamsted School in Hertfordshire and Peterhouse, Cambridge. In 1951 he married Sheila Maureen Ryan, SRN. They had one son and two daughters. One of his daughters was Suzy Moir who married The Reverend Canon David Reindorp.

In 1940 he joined up with the 5th Suffolk Regiment as an officer. In 1942 he became a Prisoner of War in Singapore. He was put to work on the notorious Burma Railway for three and a half years.

== Political career ==
He was a member of the Liberal Party. His first involvement in politics was being elected to Aylesbury Rural District Council in 1947, on which he served for two years. In 1949 he was elected as an Independent to Buckinghamshire County Council on which he served until 1975. He stood as a Liberal candidate at the United Kingdom general election of 1950 in his home constituency of Aylesbury in Buckinghamshire. He finished third and did not stand for parliament again.

General Election 1950: Aylesbury
Party	Candidate	Votes	%	±%
Conservative	Gerard Spencer Summers	17,623	44.7	−3.1
Labour	Anthony Shannon Harman	14,262	36.2	+4.1
Liberal	George Guthrie Moir	7,547	19.1	−1.0
Majority		3,361	8.5	−7.2
Turnout			83.4	
Conservative hold		Swing	-3.6	

In 1950 he became the Director of the European Youth Campaign. In 1952 he was elected the second ever President of the World Assembly of Youth, serving until 1956.

== Professional career ==
In 1958 he became Assistant Controller and Executive Producer at Rediffusion Television. In 1968 he became head of Education and Religious programmes at Thames Television. (He was a Member of the General Synod of the Church of England, formerly House of Laity, Church Assembly, from 1956–75.)

== Publications ==
- (editor) Why I Believe, 1964
- (editor) Life’s Work, 1965
- (editor) Teaching and Television: ETV Explained, 1967
- (editor) Beyond Hatred, 1969
- The Suffolk Regiment, 1969
- Into Television, 1969

He wrote contributions for The Times, Times Educational Supplement, Church Times, The Contemporary Review and The Frontier.

== See also ==
- World Assembly of Youth
- Aylesbury (UK Parliament constituency)
