= David Reindorp =

English Anglican priest

The Reverend Canon David Reindorp TD DL

Personal details
- Born: 21 October 1952 (age 73) London, England
- Denomination: Anglican
- Occupation: Priest, army chaplain
- Education: Trinity College, Cambridge; Westcott House, Cambridge

David Reindorp TD DL (born 21 October 1952) is an English Anglican priest who was the incumbent of Chelsea Old Church in London from 2006 to 2021.

== Biography ==
Reindorp was born in Westminster, England to the Right Reverend George Reindorp (Bishop of Guildford and Salisbury) and Alix Edington. Reindorp spent several of his early years in South Africa before returning to attend Lancing College in West Sussex. After a brief time as an insurance broker for Lloyd's of London, he worked as a social worker before attending Trinity College, Cambridge and Westcott House, Cambridge. He was ordained as a priest in the Diocese of Ely in 1982.

Reindorp had curacies in Cambridge and in Hitchin, Hertfordshire, before becoming Vicar of St John the Evangelist, Waterbeach, Cambridgeshire in 1988 followed by an incumbency in a church of the same name in the centre of Cambridge. He was made an honorary canon of Ely Cathedral in March 2005.

Reindorp was inducted as the Vicar of Chelsea Old Church, one of London's oldest churches, situated on the bank of the River Thames in the affluent area of Chelsea. He was padre to the Honourable Artillery Company, the oldest regiment in the British Army, holding the rank of major, and to the Worshipful Company of Fan Makers.

Reindorp developed a reputation as a public speaker with talks such as "Millionaire or Bust" which charted his career from shipping broker to priest. He has also appeared in several reality television programmes in England, including Bad Lads' Army in which he had the role of an army chaplain.

== Personal life ==
Reindorp married Suzy Moir, a psychotherapist and daughter of Guthrie Moir, one of the founders of Independent Television, in Salisbury Cathedral in 1974. The couple were married by Reindorp's father, Bishop George Reindorp. They have three children.

The Reindorp family currently live in their home on Cheyne Walk in Chelsea, London.
