= World Assembly of Youth =

International organization

World Assembly of Youth Assemblée Mondiale de la Jeunesse Asamblea Mundial de la Juventud
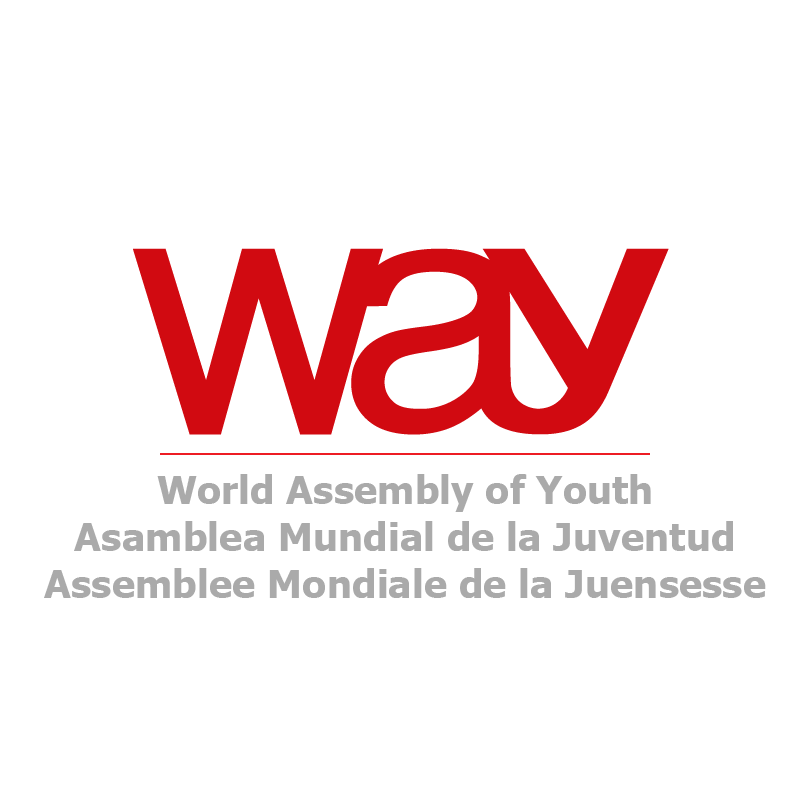
- Abbreviation: WAY
- Founded: 24 August 1949
- Type: INGO
- Purpose: Youth
- Headquarters: World Youth Complex, Lebuh Ayer Keroh, Ayer Keroh, 75450 Melaka, Malaysia
- Region served: Worldwide
- Official language: English; French; Spanish
- General Secretary: (Albania) Ediola Pashollari
- President: (Malaysia) Idris Haron
- Main organ: General Assembly
- Affiliations: UNAIDS UNEP ILO UNESCO UNFPA UNICEF WHO UNDP ECOSOC DPI UNCTAD
- Staff: 12
- Volunteers: 1300
- Website: way.org.my

The World Assembly of Youth (WAY; French: Assemblée Mondiale de la Jeunesse; Spanish: Asamblea Mundial de la Juventud) is the international coordinating body of national youth councils and national youth organisations. The full members of WAY are national youth councils. WAY currently has 140 member organisations from all continents. As the international coordinating body of national youth councils, WAY has special consultative status with the United Nations, the highest status possible for a non-governmental organization. WAY co-operates with the UN and many of its special agencies, particularly with UNAIDS, UNEP, ILO, UNESCO, UNFPA, UNICEF, UNDP, UNCTAD and WHO.

The World Assembly of Youth recognises the Universal Declaration of Human Rights as the basis of its action and services. WAY promotes the work of youth organisations in areas such as: democracy, environment, human rights, population, health, drugs, community development, leadership training, and cultural and religious tolerance. It provides opportunities for youth representatives from different countries to exchange ideas and experiences, to coordinate programme plans, and to reach a better understanding of each other's problems due to differences in racial, religious, and national backgrounds.

The regional structure of the National Youth Councils in all the continents, Asian Youth Council, European Youth Forum, Caribbean Youth Forum, Forum for the Integration of Asean Youth, Pacific Youth Council, Arab Youth Union, Pan-African Youth Union, African-Arab Youth Council, SADC Youth Movement, are consultative members.

The WAY Headquarters is located in the World Youth Complex in Melaka, Malaysia, having been previously established in London, Paris, Brussels, Copenhagen, and Kuala Lumpur. The organization is financed from annual membership fees and voluntary contributions from its member organisations, and it has three official languages: English, French, and Spanish.

== History ==
In 1949, an initiative was undertaken to establish a youth organisation to promote global cooperation and understanding amongst the young people of the world. Recognising the need for a universal youth organisation, youth leaders from national youth councils of all member countries of the United Nations were invited to attend an international conference in London. In August 1949, the international conference held at Westminster Hall in London established the World Assembly of Youth.

The draft charter, which had been prepared in February 1949 in Ashbridge, England, was ratified at the first official meeting of WAY in Brussels a year later. The meeting, organised by the Belgian Youth Council, was attended by more than 100 young people from 37 countries. The WAY Charter was ratified by 29 of the national youth councils present, and WAY began its work on behalf of the world youth community.

The WAY headquarters has moved throughout the years to various bases including Brussels, Paris, London and Copenhagen. In 1999, the WAY headquarters moved to Kuala Lumpur, Malaysia, and now has finally established its headquarters building, the World Youth Complex, in Melaka, a southern state of Malaysia.

== Past leadership ==
=== Presidents ===
Term	President	Nationality
1949 - 1952	Mr Maurice Sauvé	Canada
1952 - 1954	Mr Guthrie Moir	Great Britain
1954–1956	Mr Guthrie Moir	Great Britain
1956–1958	Mr Antoine Lawrence	Guinea
1958–1962	Mr Ravindra Varma	India
1962–1964	Mr Carlos Delgado	Peru
1964–1966	Mr Romeo Maione	Canada
1966–1969	Mr Alessandro Berti	Italy
1969–1972	Mr Peter Schieder	Austria
1972–1975	Mr Thomas Sandiford	Guyana
1975–1982	Mr Ole Lovig Simonsen	Denmark
1982–1988	Mr Ole Lovig Simonsen	Denmark
1988–1993	Mr Ole Lovig Simonsen	Denmark
1993–2000	Mr Datuk Seri Mohd Ali Rustam	Malaysia
2000–2005	Mr Datuk Seri Mohd Ali Rustam	Malaysia
2005– 2010	Mr Datuk Seri Mohd Ali Rustam	Malaysia
2010–Present	Mr Datuk Seri Ir. Idris Haron	Malaysia

=== Secretaries general ===
Term	Secretary general	Nationality
1949 - 1952	Mr Paul Mercereau	France
1952 - 1954	Mr Paul Mercereau	France
1954 - 1956	Ms Helen M. Dale de Mestral	United Kingdom
1956 - 1958	Ms Helen M. Dale de Mestral	United Kingdom
1958 - 1962	Mr David Wirmark	Sweden
1962 - 1964	Mr David Wirmark	Sweden
1964 - 1966	Mr Carl-Axel Valén	Sweden
1966 - 1969	Mr Jyoti Shankar Singh	India
1969 - 1972	Mr Jyoti Shankar Singh	India
1972 - 1975	Mr Carlos Antonio Carrasco	Bolivia
1975 - 1982	Mr John Danquah	Ghana
1982 - 1988	Mr Shiv Khare	India
1988 - 1993	Mr Shiv Khare	India
1993 - 2000	Mr Heikki Pakarinen	Finland
2000 - 2004	Mr Donald Tinotenda Charumbira	Zimbabwe
2004 - 2007	Mr Donald Tinotenda Charumbira	Zimbabwe
2007 - 2010	Ms Ediola Pashollari	Albania
2010–Present	Ms Ediola Pashollari	Albania

== Activities ==
The World Assembly of Youth has two main tasks:

To represent its members towards international organisations and institutions and promote the work of voluntary youth organisations all over the world. WAY deals with all issues affecting youth in international, regional, and local level.

WAY organises events on global, regional, and national levels. These events are often carried out in cooperation with other international youth organisations, regional youth structures or national affiliates. WAY's representatives participate in various UN working groups and other meetings promoting youth issues and the interests of member organisations.

== Aims ==
- Increase inter-ethnic respect and to foster inter-cultural and international understanding and cooperation.
- Facilitate the collection of information about the needs and problems of youth.
- Disseminate information about the methods, techniques and activities of youth organisations.
- Promote the interchange of ideas between youth of all countries.
- Assist in the development of youth activities and to promote, by mutual aid, the extension of the work of voluntary youth organizations.
- Cooperate in the development of national youth councils of voluntary youth organizations.
- Establish and maintain relations with the international organisations, both voluntary and governmental.
- Support and encourage the national movements of non-self governing countries in their struggle for national liberation.
- Promote tolerance, understanding, solidarity and cooperation among young men and women irrespective of race, sex, language, religion or political orientation.
- Encourage the full participation of young men and women in the development process of their countries.
- Improve the equality between young men and women.
- Promote the democratic participation of young people both in their own organisations and in the life of society as a whole.
- Act as a representative body of national youth councils to the UN and other appropriate governmental and non-governmental international bodies.

== Main organs ==
=== General Assembly ===
The paramount body of WAY is the General Assembly, which determines the policies and programmes of the organisation. The General Assembly is convened every four years, and votes on the admission of new members and the adoption of policies. The General Assembly also elects the officers who are charged with the responsibility of implementing WAY's programmes. The officers include the Bureau and the Executive Committee.

=== Bureau ===
The Bureau consists of WAY's president and five Vice Presidents, who are elected at the General Assembly. The Bureau meets between meetings of the executive committee to review and supervise the work of the Secretariat.

==== Current members ====
Name	Position	Nationality
Datuk Seri Utama Ir. Idris Haron	President	Malaysia
Munkhbat Ayush	Vice President	Mongolia
Hussein Abdullah M. Al-Ahmed	Vice President	Yemen
Preye Jerome Ketebu-Brown	Vice President	Nigeria
Benedice Louis Sibanda	Vice President	Botswana
Mohamed M M Suliman	Vice President	Libya

=== Executive committee ===
The Executive Committee has 13 members. The present members are of 13 different nationalities from North and South, East and West. The executive committee is charged with the general administration of WAY and the implementation of programmes drawn up by the General Assembly. The executive committee meets at least once a year.

==== Current members ====
Name	Position	Nationality
	EXCO Member	Korea
Blagica Petrova	EXCO Member	North Macedonia
Muesse Kazapua	EXCO Member	Namibia
Simone Phillip	EXCO Member	Trinidad and Tobago
Belmani Abdel Jalal	EXCO Member	Morocco
Leyla R. Israfilova	EXCO Member	Azerbaijan
Mustafa M. Radja	EXCO Member	Indonesia

=== Secretariat ===
The Secretariat headed by the Secretary General Ms. Ediola Pashollari and support staff, carry out the daily work of the organisation in accordance with the guidelines established by the General Assembly and its elected bodies. The Secretariat of WAY is located in Melaka, Malaysia .

== Members ==
The World Assembly of Youth currently has 140 member organisations. There are four membership status granted by the executive committee at each General Assembly. These status are: Full, Associate, Observer, and Consultative. In accordance with Article IV and V of the WAY Charter, membership of WAY is granted as follows:

Full members of WAY are national youth councils which are representing a cross section of democratic, voluntary youth organisations in a country or territory, and which have ratified the Charter and are admitted by the Assembly by a vote of the majority of its members.

The Assembly has the power to admit national youth councils or national youth organisations, which are interested in regular co-operation with WAY, as associated members, provided that a member national youth councils of WAY does not already exist in the country in question.

Regional youth organisations with national youth councils as members may be provided consultative status. They shall be permanent invitees to the meetings of the Bureau and the executive committee without the right to vote.

The executive committee may admit international organisations, national youth councils and national youth organisations as observers, provided that a member national youth council does not exist in the country in question.

=== Africa ===
Country	Organization	Status
Algeria	National Youth Organisation (Algeria)	Observer
Angola	National Youth Council of Angola	Full
Benin	Benin Association for Youth Development	Observer
Botswana	Botswana National Youth Council	Full
Burkina Faso	Youth Solidarity Association	Observer
Cameroon	Cameroon National Youth Council	Full
Comoros	National Union of Youth of Comoros	Full
Congo	Forum for Youth Development	Observer
Congo DR	Congolese Association for Youth Development	Observer
Ethiopia	Ethiopia Youth League	Observer
Gambia	National Youth Council of Gambia	Full
Ghana	National Youth Council of Ghana	Full
Guinea Bissau	National Youth Council of Guinea Bissau	Full
Ivory Coast	Federation of Movements and Associations of Youth and Children of Ivory Coast	Full
Kenya	Kenya Association of Youth Organisations	Full
Lesotho	Lesotho Youth Federation	Full
Libya	National Organisation of Libyan Youth	Full
Madagascar	Madagascar Ecumenical Network of Youth and Students	Observer
Mali	Malian Movement for Youth Promotion	Full
Mauritius	National Youth Council of Mauritius	Full
Morocco	Youth Workers of Morocco	Observer
Mozambique	Organization of Mozambican Youth	Associate
Namibia	National Youth Council of Namibia	Full
Nigeria	National Youth Council of Nigeria	Full
Rwanda	Rwanda National Youth Council	Full
Senegal	National Youth Council of Senegal	Full
Seychelles	Seychelles People's Progressive Front Youth League	Observer
Sierra Leone	Sierra Leone Federation of Youth Organisations	Full
Somalia	Somalia Youth Council	Full
South Africa	South Africa Youth Council	Full
Sudan	General Sudanese Students Union	Observer
Swaziland	Swaziland National Youth Council	Full
Tanzania	Youth Council of Tanzania	Associate
Tunisia	National Union of Youth Organisations	Associate
Uganda	Uganda National Youth Council	Full
Western Sahara	Sahrawi Youth Union	Observer
Zambia	National Youth Development Council of Zambia	Full
Zimbabwe	Zimbabwe Youth Council	Full

=== Asia ===
Country	Organization	Status
Bangladesh	National Youth and Social Welfare Council	Full
Bhutan	Bhutan Youth Development Association	Associate
Brunei	Brunei Youth Council	Full
Cambodia	Cambodian Youth Development Center	Associate
China	All China Youth Federation	Observer
East Timor	East Timor National Youth Organisations	Full
India	Indian Committee of Youth Organisations	Full
Indonesia	National Youth Committee of Indonesia	Full
Iraq	General Federation of Iraqi Youth	Full
Jordan	National Union of Jordanian Youth	Full
Korea	National Council of Youth Organisations in Korea	Full
Kuwait	Public Authority for Youths and Sports	Observer
Malaysia	Malaysian Youth Council	Full
Mongolia	Mongolian Youth Federation	Full
Nepal	Social Youth Council of Nepal	Full
Pakistan	All Pakistan Youth Federation	Full
Philippines	National Youth Commission	Observer
Singapore	Peoples Association Youth Movement	Observer
Sri Lanka	National Youth Services Council of Sri Lanka	Full
Syria	Syrian Youth Union	Observer
Thailand	Thailand National Council of Youth and Child Development	Full
Vietnam	Vietnam Youth Federation	Observer
Yemen	Yemen Youth General Union	Full
UAE	Emirates National Students Union	Observer

=== Caribbean ===
Country	Organization	Status
Anguilla	Anguilla National Youth Council	Full
Bahamas	Bahamas National Youth Council	Full
Barbados	Barbados Youth Development Council	Full
Belize	Belize National Youth Council	Full
Dominica	National Youth Council of Dominica	Full
Guyana	Georgetown Youth Leaders Council	Full
Jamaica	National Youth Council of Jamaica	Full
Montserrat	Montserrat National Youth Council	Full
Puerto Rico	Youth Organisation Council of Puerto Rico	Full
Sao Tome and Principe	National Alliance of YMCAs	Observer
Saint Kitts	St. Kitts National Youth Council	Full
Suriname	Suriname National Youth Assembly	Full
Trinidad and Tobago	Trinidad and Tobago Youth Council	Full

=== Europe ===
Country	Organization	Status
Albania	Albanian Youth Federation	Observer
Armenia	National Youth Council of Armenia	Full
Czech Republic	National Youth Council of Bohemia, Moravia and Silesia	Full
Croatia	Croatia National Youth Council	Full
Germany	German National Committee for International Youth Work	Full
Greece	National Council of Hellenic Youth Organisations	Full
Latvia	National Youth Council of Latvia	Full
Luxembourg	National Youth Council Luxembourg	Full
North Macedonia	Youth Council of Macedonia	Full
Norway	Norwegian Children and Youth Council	Full
Poland	Polish Youth Council	Associate
Portugal	Youth Institute of Portugal	Observer
Russia	National Youth Council of Russia	Observer
Romania	National Youth Council of Romania	Full
Turkey	Youth Activities Services	Observer
United Kingdom	British Youth Council	Full

=== Latin America ===
Country	Organization	Status
Argentina	National Youth Council of Argentina	Full
Bolivia	National Council of Bolivian Youth	Full
Brazil	AMP	Observer
Chile	National Youth Council of Chile	Full
Colombia	National youth Committee of Colombia	Full
Cuba	Union of the Young Communist League	Observer
El Salvador	National Youth Council of El Salvador	Full
Ecuador	International Youth House of Ecuador	Full
Guatemala	Guatemala Youth Development Committee	Associate
Mexico	Mexican Institute of Youth	Observer
Nicaragua	National Youth Council of Nicaragua	Full
Paraguay	Paraguay Youth and Students Hostel Association	Observer
Peru	National Council of Peruvian Youth	Full

=== Pacific ===
Country	Organization	Status
Australia	Australian Youth Policy and Action Coalition	Full
Cook Islands	Cook Islands National Youth Council	Full
Fiji	Fiji National Youth Council	Full
Niue	Niue National Youth Council	Full
Papua New Guinea	National Youth Service	Full
Solomon Islands	Solomon Islands National Youth Congress	Full
Tonga	Tonga National Youth Congress	Full
Vanuatu	Vanuatu National Youth Council	Full
Western Samoa	Western Samoa National Youth Council	Full

=== North America ===
Country	Organization	Status
Canada	Canada World Youth	Full
USA	Youth Network Council	Full

=== Consultative ===
Country	Organization	Status
Sudan	African-Arab Youth Council	Consultative
Malaysia	Asian Youth Council	Consultative
Syria	Arab Youth Union	Consultative
Brazil	Caribbean Youth Forum	Consultative
Belgium	European Youth Forum	Consultative
Brazil	Forum for the Integration of Andean Youth	Consultative
Fiji	Pacific Youth Council	Consultative
Algeria	Pan-African Youth Union	Consultative
South Africa	Southern African Community Development Youth Movement	Consultative

== Volunteer programme ==
The World Assembly of Youth has established a volunteers programme that seeks to develop a dedicated corps of young people who will be willing to assist in WAY programmes and activities around the world.

== World Youth Institute ==
WAY established the World Youth Institute (WYI), with main function as a vehicle for education and training of young people around the world. The World Youth Institute is geared to be a leading institution for empowerment and capacity building through education, training, and development programmes.

== See also ==
- World Federation of Democratic Youth
- International Union of Students
