= David Brown (bishop) =

David Allan Brown (11 July 1922 – 13 July 1982) was Bishop of Guildford from 1973 until his death aged 60 in 1982.

He was born on 11 July 1922 and educated at Monkton Combe School and SOAS. He was ordained in 1949 and after a curacy at Immanuel, Streatham he was a Missionary with the Church Missionary Society in Sudan, Jordan, Lebanon and Syria from 1952 to 1966 and then Vicar of Christ Church, Herne Bay. A school in Woking is named in his memory.

Church of England titles
Preceded by George Reindorp	Bishop of Guildford; 1973–1982	Succeeded by Michael Adie
