= All Souls, St Margarets =

- St Margarets-on-Thames – All Souls
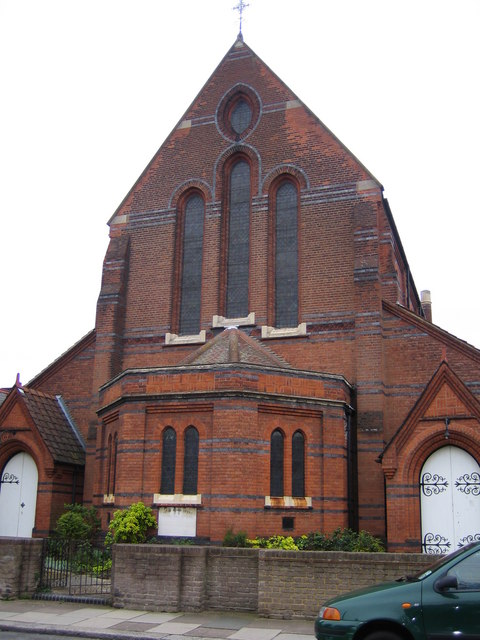
- All Souls, St Margarets
- 51°27′38.0″N 0°19′30.8″W
- Location: Northcote Road, Twickenham TW1 1PB
- Country: England
- Denomination: Church of England
- Churchmanship: Open Evangelical
- Website: www.allsoulschurch.org.uk

History
- Dedicated: 2 January 1898

Architecture
- Architect: Edward Monson
- Style: Gothic
- Years built: 1896-8

Specifications
- Materials: red brick

Administration
- Diocese: Diocese of London
- Archdeaconry: Middlesex
- Deanery: Hounslow
- Parish: All Souls, St Margarets-on-Thames

Clergy
- Vicar: Joe Sellers

All Souls, St Margarets, is a Church of England church on Northcote Road in St Margarets in the London Borough of Richmond upon Thames. Its vicar is Joe Sellers.

== History ==
=== The roots of the church ===
The roots of the church are quite unknown. In 1867 a small private congregation met in an unidentified cottage on an area known as the Railshead, which got its name from the large mansion, like many in the area which graced the riverbank. However, the suburbs were expanding, especially in St Margarets, with its ever growing number of roads and estates, and with that would come more members of the church. Before the railway station brought more people to this part of London, Twickenham was a pretty place with an abundance of Palladian and 18th-century villas, lining the Thames, which became known as 'The Arcadia'. However, the 2nd October 1876 (the opening of St Margarets Station) marked the day when the peace and beauty of such a place, would come to a halt. With this there would be more people coming to worship god, and a bigger congregation would form. On 2 February 1886 an iron chapel on Northcote Road started to be used.

=== The iron chapel ===
The iron room, as identified on the 1886 OS map, was used for worship from February 6, 1886. It was dedicated to St Margaret, and was located on Northcote Road, on the site of the current newer church hall. It was only intended to be temporary. It was built for £400 by Mr Harbrow of Brixton. Many churches had Iron or Tin tabernacles on the site of what would be the main church. The priest, Rev. W.C. Tuting, preached ‘The dangers of failure and dangers of success ’ (concerning the new church). The chapel continued to be served by All Saints Isleworth until 1889 until the living of All Saints ceased. It was then taken over by the London Diocesian Home Mission. Eventually, the construction of the church begun in 1896. When today's 1890s church was completed, the smaller iron tabernacle was used for Sunday Schools.

=== The new church ===
Plan of All Souls Church, by the architect, Edward Monson, 1895 or 6

Finally, the St Margaret’s area of Twickenham would have a proper place of worship. Plans were drawn up by Edward Monson, an Acton architect. He had already designed St Martin’s Hale Gardens, Acton, and St Alban the Martyr, South Parade, Acton Green. If you look at the façade of St Alban’s church you will notice that it is identical to All Souls’ façade. You will also notice that the nave is exactly the same, but the chancel is much larger, with a side chapel and (former) organ chamber. The chancel in All Souls Church appears unusually small for a church, creating a stubby effect of the church, with only a nave and no side chapels. This is because All Souls Church was never completed. Monson’s plans tell us that he intended the church to be identical with St Alban’s. The Richmond and Twickenham Times, from October 3, 1896 tell us that the church was intended to have the same layout as St Alban’s. However, it also states that a temporary chancel was going to be constructed, and when enough money had been raised, the church would be completed to Monson’s full plans. The church was built by William Pattinson and sons at a cost of £2,497. The foundation stone was laid by Alfred Earle, Lord Bishop of Marlborough, on October 3, 1896. The laying of the foundation stone’s ceremony, commented that day at 3:30 PM. It was a short ceremony, many invitations had been issued, and cordially responded to. During the ceremony, Alfred was presented with a trowel for laying the stone, by Monson, the architect.Marlborough advanced to the stone, tested it with the plummet, tapped it with the mallet, then he declared the following words:

’In the faith of Jesus Christ, we place this corner-stone in the name of God the Father, God the Son, and the Holy Ghost, amen.’

=== The consecration of the church ===
The day of consecration was 'bright and fine'. A very large congregation filled the church on the day. The Ceremony was performed by the Rt. Rev. Lord Bishop of London, on 2 January 1898. The Bishop, with several members of the local clergy and officials, assembled in the church room, and led a canopy to the western door. A procession was then formed. After passing around the site, entering at the western door, a special service commenced with Psalm CXXII. Then the petition for the consecration was presented to the Bishop, and chanting Psalm XXIV, the procession moved to the blue draped chancel. At the high altar, upon which candles had been lighted, the Bishop received the instruments of donation and other muniments of title, and invoked prayer for the church, after which he pronounced a prayer. Then the procession reformed, and walked to the west end, then to the font, to the side altar, to the chancel steps, to the prayer desk, the lectern, the pulpit, the choir stalls and the altar. Eventually, the consecration speech was read by the Bishop:

'By virtue of our sacred office in the Church of God we do now consecrate, and for ever set apart from all profane and common uses, this House of God, under the name of All Souls, and to the Glory of the every blessed Trinity, Father, Son and Holy Ghost. Amen. Peace be within these walls, and holiness which becometh God's House for ever. Behold a ladder set up on the earth, and the top of it reached to heaven; and behold the angels of God ascending and descending on it. Surely the Lord is in this place. This is none other than the house of God, and this is the gate of heaven.'

=== The new church in St Margarets ===
The new church was already popular in the community, and several clubs had been set up, such as the Working Mens' club. The first vicar was the Rev. Ernest Arundell Morgan.

=== Stewart Headlam ===
Stewart Headlam, the famous christian socialist, moved to St Margarets in about 1898. He preached here at All Souls. In 1905 an anonymous complaint was made that he carried the cross wrong at a communion.

== A guide to the church ==
=== The exterior ===
All Souls, c.1905

All Souls is not as the architect, Edward Monson, intended it. It was never completed, and that is why the chancel is so short. The architect also intended for a bellcote where the strange little tower on the south-east side of the roof. The aisles have tripled lancet windows, as do the clerestories. The baptistry has coupled lancets- three of them, the central one above the foundation stone. The exterior comprises of red brick, as does the interior. The view from the east is especially imposing and dramatic, when viewed from the main road. The façade has three main windows with a smaller one at the top. All is classic of the time.

=== The interior ===
The interior has some notable features mentioned here.

====== The baptistry ======
Interior of All Souls Church, Twickenham, 1906

The baptistry is a small addition to the lofty interior. It has two fine stained glass windows, dating from 1910, made by Leonard F. Pownall of Falmouth, signed by him. It is in memory of Helen Sharpe, a teacher, and it is supposed to depict her 'beloved son'. It shows St John the Baptist being baptised in the right lancet, with him as an adult on the left, supposed to be Sharpe's son. It is a suitable addition to the area in the church. The font is original to the church.

====== The South Aisle ======
Window to Helen Sharpe, All Souls Church Twickenham, 1910

Memorials

All Souls Twickenham plan by Edward Monson probably 1896

.Alfred Prior, died March 20, 1920 aged 74

.War Memorial

Windows .‘To the Glory of God the life and remembrance and work of Thomas,Robert and Eliza Moore Revs:RSD'Left Shield Alpha,Right Shield Omega, signed by Jones and Willis, 1926, three lancets. . 2000 Memorial window.

Organ

The organ inserted in 1983 from St Mary, Stamford Brook, All Souls Church, Twickenham Crucifix in All Souls Church, Twickenham

There is no organ in All Souls Church at present, although there has been in the past. The picture from 1906 above shows the pipes of the original organ, in the top right corner of the image. An organ is marked on Edward Monson's original plan, also shown above, in the location shown in the picture. The first organist in All Souls Church was Mr. Frederick.S.Abbott.There was another organ at the East end of the South Aisle , inserted in 1983. It came from St Mary Stamford Brook (now flats). It was made by Henry Willis and Co. in 1886. It is now located in St Martin Hereford.

====== North Aisle ======
Memorials

.Hertie Claude Milne(1980-1)

.Stewart Headlam

.Margaret Hill (died 1912)

Stained Glass

.Dated 1961 ‘In Remembrance of William,Water and Maria Pearce also their daughter Gertrude Maude’.Made up of three lancets,left;St Alban (above),St Augustine (below),right;St Peter.

.Window, the lights, hanging above door, unknown original position.Angels holding texts, and Christ Crowned with Thorns, made by Shrigley and Hunt, unknown date.

Chancel

The chancel is shorter than intended, as can be seen on the plan above, but enough money was never raised.

====== Crucifix ======
The crucifix hanging above the chancel probably dates from 1953, and is probably by The Faith Craft Works, 7 Tufton Street Westminster. It will be, if by them, by Francis Stephens. However, a crucifix appears on a contemporary view of the chancel on the 1920s parish magazines, but it is probably from 1953.

Window in all souls twickenham, 1961

====== Altar Table ======
The altar table is original to the church, made by Willis and Jones.

====== Stained Glass Windows ======
The three stained glass windows are the tallest in the church, having been installed in 1953, and made by Arthur S.Pearce. The left one shows the Annunciation; Nativity; Baptism; Transfiguration. The right one shows the Anointing of Jesus' feet; Entry to Jerusalem; Flagellation; Bearing cross and the central one shows the Risen Christ; Deposition.

The War Memorial

The war memorial in All Souls Church dates from the Great War (WWI) 1914-18. It lists 86 local men who gave their lives in the war. There are also two small crosses flanking it to Lawrence Frank Richards and Geoffrey Wilkins. The crosses originally came from muddy fields in Flanders. They are a reminder of the devastating number of people who gave their lives in the war.

War Memorial to 86 local men who gave their lives in the First World War, All Souls church, Twickenham

== List of vicars ==
=== 1898 - Ernest Arundell Morgan ===
Ernest Morgan

Born in 1865 in December 1865 in Blaina, Monmouthshire, Wales, Morgan was the son of David Morgan, born in 1820, and Amelia Towlson, born in 1826. Ernest Arundell Morgan married Bessie Leonora Morris and had 3 children. He passed away on 17 August 1938 in Stratton, Cornwall, England. Morgan started at All Souls in 1898, being the church's first vicar. He was suggested as a good vicar by the Rev. W.C.Tuting, who was the vicar before Morgan, when worship occurred in the small iron tabernacle. In his farewell letter in the parish magazine, Morgan stated that; ' I came, as some of you will remember , at a time of great anxiety.' Ernest came to St Margarets on 3 January 1898. He lived at Holly Lodge, St Margarets. Ernest Morgan was, after serving All Souls, instituted at St Andrew, Willesden Green on Tuesday, May 1, at 8pm.

=== 1906 - Thomas C. Crampton M.A. ===
The grave of Thomas Crampton

Crampton was baptised on 5 January 1860 at St George's Brentford High Street (now flats). His parents were Thomas James and Sarah Elizabeth Crampton. He became vicar in 1906. Very little is known about him or his time at All Souls. Crampton was introduced to All Souls by a Soirée in the Schoolroom and the Rev. Mr . Bell and Mrs.Bell, to their parishioners. The function was carried out by the churchwardens,Messrs. T.R Moore Keys and A. Prior, and they personally introduced the two rev.gentlemen to the parishioners as they arrived. Refreshments were handed round, and a brief programme of music was contributed by Miss Enid Staples, Miss Eda Hill, Mr.Graham, Mr.Flax, while Mrs. Cope, in absence of Mr. Walsham, acted as accompanist.,’and herself sang a very sweet little song’ (parish magazine). Crampton gave his thanks. He passed away on 3 April 1908 whilst serving All Souls and was buried in Teddington Cemetery. He was buried with his mother Sarah Elizabeth Crampton who was buried on 2 June 1906 aged 80.

1908 - Arthur Maitland Peckham

Born in Tottenham, Middlesex, England in January 1868 to Robert Peckham and Mary Ann Attree. Arthur Maitland Peckham married Kate Violet Maitland. He passed away on 8 April 1942 in Guildford, Surrey. He became the vicar of All Souls in 1908.

1914 - Edmund Douglas Merritt

1927 - Harold Frederick Peerless

1935 - Alfred Lisinea Pond

1947 - John James Frank Scammell

1954 - H.Nicholson
