= George Reindorp =

British Anglican bishop

The Right Reverend George Reindorp
- Bishop of Salisbury
- Church: Church of England
- Diocese: Salisbury
- In office: 1973–1981
- Predecessor: Joseph Fison
- Successor: John Baker
- Other post: Bishop of Guildford (1961–1973)

Orders
- Consecration: 1961

Personal details
- Born: 11 December 1911
- Died: 20 April 1990 (aged 78)
- Spouse: Alix Edington (died 1987); Bridget Mullens (1988–1990)
- Education: Trinity College, Cambridge

George Edmund Reindorp (11 December 1911 – 20 April 1990) was an Anglican bishop. He was the 5th Bishop of Guildford in the Church of England and subsequently the 75th Bishop of Salisbury.

Reindorp was educated at Felsted School and Trinity College, Cambridge. After a curacy in Kensington and wartime service in the Royal Naval Volunteer Reserve his ministry positions included the incumbency of St Stephen's with St John's, Westminster and Provost of Southwark Cathedral before his consecration to the episcopate. On Lady Day 1961 (25 March) at Southwark Cathedral, he was consecrated a bishop by Geoffrey Fisher, Archbishop of Canterbury, to serve as Bishop of Guildford. In 1973, he was installed as the Bishop of Salisbury. One of his first actions was summarily to determine (without interview) the licences of eight clergy who were either divorced and remarried or married to a spouse who had been previously divorced.

Reindorp married a South African doctor qualified in surgery, Alix Edington, in South Africa following the end of the Second World War. The Reindorps gained a reputation as public speakers on the British lecture circuit. Their clerical and medical backgrounds earned the couple the nickname "Body and Soul". Reindorp had four children with Alix. Two of his sons, David and Julian, have been ordained in the Church of England. Reindorp's only daughter, Fiona, married Sir Richard Baskerville Mynors, Bt. Reindorp's youngest son, Richard, became a teacher in the East End of London before moving into the Civil Service. After the death of his first wife in 1987, Reindorp married Lady Bridget Mullens (30 March 1918 – 25 January 1991). The service was conducted by his eldest son, Julian.

A prolific author and broadcaster he died in retirement three years after his first wife Alix. Reindorp has 10 surviving grandchildren, the eldest of whom, Nicola Reindorp, is the head of Oxfam International in the United States.

A biography of Reindorp was written but not published in full. Parts of his life were edited and published in a shortened form. This was privately circulated and focussed mainly on his time as a parish priest. He was mainly remembered for his sense of humour and sermons built around three key words, e.g. "launch", "nevertheless", "partners".

For many years in Guildford, Surrey, he had a school named after him. In 2003 Bishop Reindorp Secondary school was demolished and a new building built in its place, Christ's College, Guildford, as a "Christian college".

Church of England titles
Preceded by Hugh Edward Ashdown	Provost of Southwark; 1957–1961	Succeeded by Ernest William Southcott
Preceded by Ivor Stanley Watkins	Bishop of Guildford; 1961–1973	Succeeded by David Allan Brown
Preceded by Joseph Fison	Bishop of Salisbury; 1973–1982	Succeeded by John Austin Baker
