= Revelation TV =

British Christian TV channel

Programming
- Picture format: 16:9 SDTV

Links
- Website: www.revelationtv.com

Availability

Terrestrial
- Freeview: Channel 264

Revelation TV is a UK Protestant Christian Zionist television channel started by Howard and Lesley Conder in 2003. It broadcasts on Freesat channel 692, Freeview HD channel 264, Sky channel 581, the Roku box and is also available online on iOS and Android devices, Apple TV, Samsung and LG Smart TVs. The channel is based in Spain, with a small studio and office in England.

== History ==
Howard Conder (an ex-Jehovah's Witness) and his wife Lesley began the TV station in 2003 by forming a private company and remortgaging their home to put their own money into it. They built trust with their viewership and know their most ardent viewers by name.

Between 2004 and 2014, the station was censured five times by Ofcom, for homophobic comments made on air, and for graphic depiction of aborted fetuses in an item aired before a children's programme. In a 2007 interview with The Guardian, Howard Conder said that the regulator Ofcom had received complaints from viewers about the channel's views of homosexuality.

In 2007, following the lifting of Ofcom restrictions, the channel was allowed to ask for funds on air.

On 10 February 2010, American evangelist Justin Peters was interviewed live on Revelation TV. Peters is an outspoken critic of the Word of Faith movement and, during the interview, mentioned several prominent proponents of this doctrine by name such as Benny Hinn, Creflo Dollar and Kenneth Copeland. The programme was taken off-air before its scheduled end time, due to concerns that making accusations against specific individuals who were not present breached Ofcom rules on fairness. Lesley Conder criticised Peters the following morning, but the incident was widely discussed online.

On 1 December 2011 evangelist and preacher Jacob Prasch announced on his website that he had left Revelation TV after the channel began broadcasting a weekly Jesse Duplantis show. Prasch accused Duplantis of being a heterodox preacher of the Word of Faith doctrine. Presenter Bob Mitchell subsequently also left, and Prophetic Witness Movement International also pulled out of the station.

The channel moved to Spain in 2010. As of 2012, Revelation TV had a permanent television studio base in Spain. An underground car park space was converted into a new television studio, from which several programmes are now transmitted.

In November 2014 the Charity Commission for England and Wales said that Revelation TV was under investigation, after it identified regulatory concerns about trustees' benefits, conflicts of interest and a "potential significant loss of charitable funds". The Revelation Foundation said it welcomed the inquiry and would cooperate fully with proceedings. On 16 June 2015, the channel released a statement which said that the Charity Commission had identified no loss or misappropriation of charitable funds by the trustees. In October 2020, the Charity Commission for England and Wales closed the enquiry into Revelation TV. Although the enquiry did find failings in the structure and governance of the Revelation Foundation (the charity behind Revelation TV) it found no evidence of mis-appropriation of funds.

From around early 2015, fundraising commenced for the purchase of land and the building of a new purpose built television studio complex for the channel in Spain, as their current studio facilities, located in an underground car park space was deemed unfit for purpose, due to the lack of studio space, office space and restrictions imposed on them by their landlord.

By March 2019, the land was bought, and construction of the new television studio and complex nearing completion with final fitting out work being completed to install cameras, sound and other equipment. The new complex is expected to house three new studios, one of which will be a dedicated music studio. The full completion of the new studio complex was expected to be made by the end of 2019 or early 2020.

British politician Nigel Farage was interviewed on Revelation TV in November 2019. He talked about "globalists" and a "new world order".

=== Genesis TV ===
Another channel, Genesis TV, was formerly broadcast on Sky channel 592. It used to play much of the same content from RMusicTV, and a music show, The One to One Show, produced and hosted by presenter Michael Owusu. In February 2010 a Genesis TV presenter read off a message from a prankster who called himself 'Repmykipz', which claimed to be a story of salvation, but was merely an adaptation of the theme song of the American sitcom The Fresh Prince of Bel-Air. The presenter then went to another message from the same person consisting of the plot of Star Wars. A posting of the prank on YouTube went viral and as of 2015 had been viewed over one million times.

On 22 March 2010, Genesis TV allowed a debate between the leader of the British National Party, Nick Griffin and the leader of the Christian Party, George Hargreaves, as the two were competing against each other for the Barking constituency in the 2010 General election. Genesis TV was closed down and merged with Revelation TV on 1 April 2010. Revelation TV later moved to Sky channel 581 after the slot was given up by GOD TV.

On 10 March 2010, the station announced that Genesis TV and Revelation TV would be merging into a single channel, to be called Revelation TV, with effect from 1 April 2010.
