= Christopher Hill (bishop) =

British bishop

The Right Reverend Christopher Hill KCVO
- Bishop of Guildford
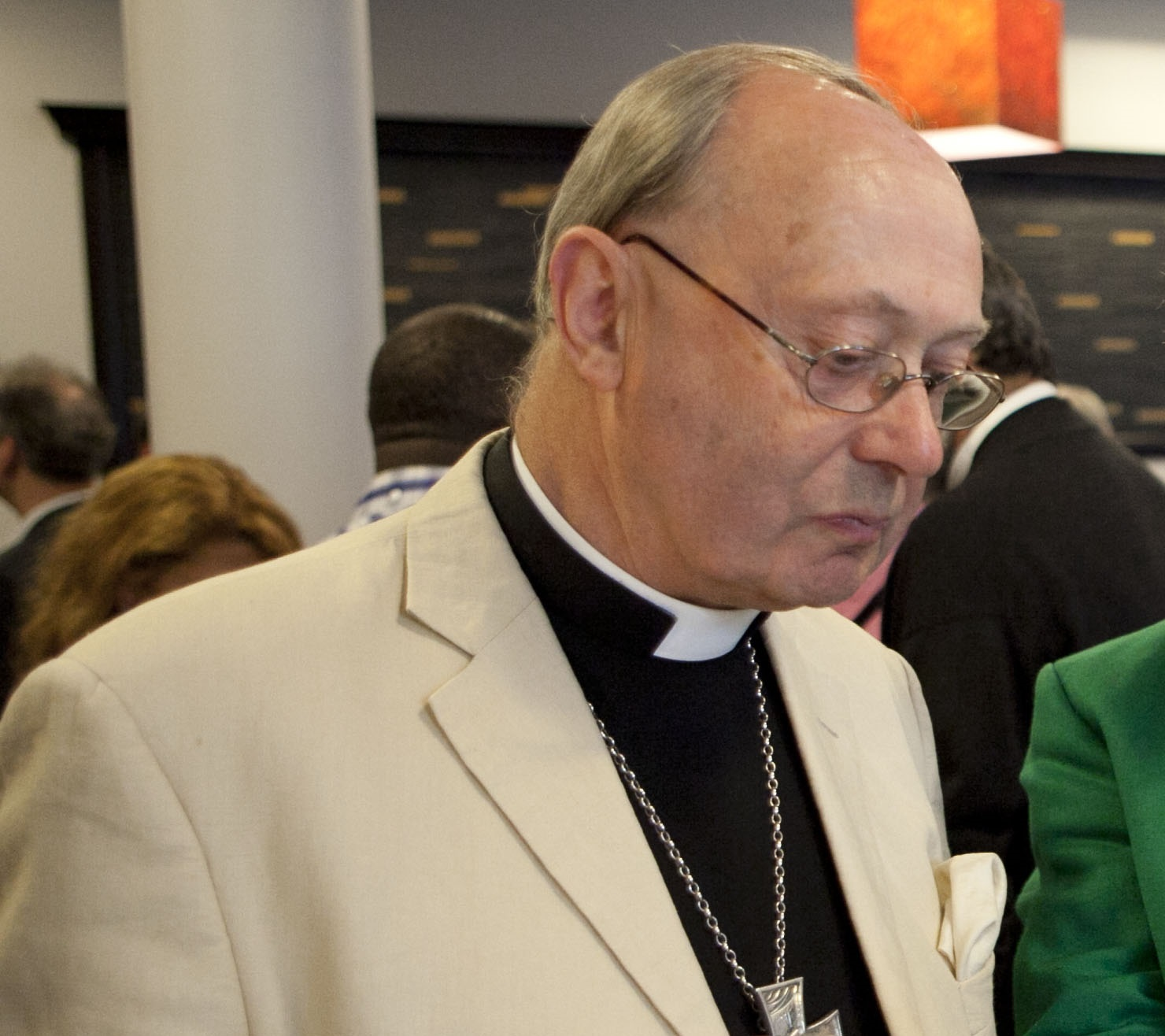
- Church: Church of England
- Diocese: Diocese of Guildford
- In office: 2004–2013
- Predecessor: John Gladwin
- Other posts: area Bishop of Stafford (1996–2004); Clerk of the Closet (2005–2014); President, Conference of European Churches (2013–present)

Orders
- Ordination: 1969 (deacon); May 1970 (priest)
- Consecration: 7 March 1996

Personal details
- Born: 10 October 1945 (age 81)
- Denomination: Anglican
- Residence: Willow Grange, Guildford
- Education: King's College London

Member of the House of Lords
- Lord Spiritual
- Bishop of Guildford; 27 May 2010 – 30 November 2013

Christopher John Hill, KCVO (born 10 October 1945) is a retired British Anglican bishop. From 1996 to 2004, he was the Bishop of Stafford, a suffragan bishop in the Diocese of Lichfield. From 2004 to 2013, he was the Bishop of Guildford, the diocesan bishop of the Diocese of Guildford. In addition, he served as the Clerk of the Closet in the Ecclesiastical Household of the Royal Household of the Sovereign of the United Kingdom from 2005 to 2014.

== Education and early career ==
Hill was educated at Sebright School and at King's College London (studying for his Bachelor of Divinity {BD} and Associate of King's College {AKC} then training for the ministry, gaining a Master of Theology {MTh}). He served his first curacy at Tividale in the Diocese of Lichfield from 1969 to 1973; he was then curate of Codsall from 1973 to 1974. From 1974 to 1981 he was the Archbishop of Canterbury's Assistant Chaplain for Foreign Relations and from 1982 to 1989 his Secretary for Ecumenical Affairs. From 1982 to 1989 he was also an honorary canon of Canterbury Cathedral. From 1987 to 1996 he was a chaplain to Elizabeth II. In 1989 he became a canon residentiary and the Precentor of St Paul's Cathedral, London, and from 1996 he was the area Bishop of Stafford in the Diocese of Lichfield.

Hill has been continuously involved in ecumenical affairs throughout his ministry. From 1974 to 1981 he was Co-Secretary of the Anglican-Roman Catholic International Commission. In 2013 he was elected president of the Council of European Churches.

== Controversies ==
In July 2009, Hill courted controversy over interference in another church's affairs by admonishing the Church of Sweden on their decision to approve same-sex marriage, sending a strongly worded letter to the head of the Church of Sweden, Archbishop Anders Wejryd, warning of "immediate and negative ecumenical consequences" owing to the decision.

== Retirement ==
On 28 March 2013, during his sermon at the Maundy Thursday Chrism Eucharist in Guildford Cathedral, Hill announced his intention to retire as Bishop of Guildford saying: "At the end of September, though I have not yet written the necessary formal letters to Queen and Archbishop, I shall hope to see many of you here for a farewell celebration for my retirement."

Ian Brackley, the suffragan Bishop of Dorking, acted as bishop commissary during the vacancy-in-see until the appointment of Andrew Watson as Bishop.

On 17 November 2014, it was announced that Hill had been succeeded as Clerk of the Closet.

== Personal life ==
In 1976, Hill married Hilary. Together they have four children: three sons and one daughter.

He is a member of the Athenaeum Club.

== Styles ==
- The Reverend Christopher Hill (1969–1989)
- The Reverend Canon Christopher Hill (1989–1996)
- The Right Reverend Christopher Hill (1996–present)

Church of England titles
Preceded by Michael Scott-Joynt	area Bishop of Stafford; 1996–2004	Succeeded by Gordon Mursell
Preceded by John Gladwin	Bishop of Guildford; 2004—2013	Succeeded by Andrew Watson
Preceded by Jonathan Bailey	Clerk of the Closet; 2005–2014	Succeeded by James Newcome
