= Bishop of Guildford =

Diocesan bishop in the Church of England

- Bishopric

anglican
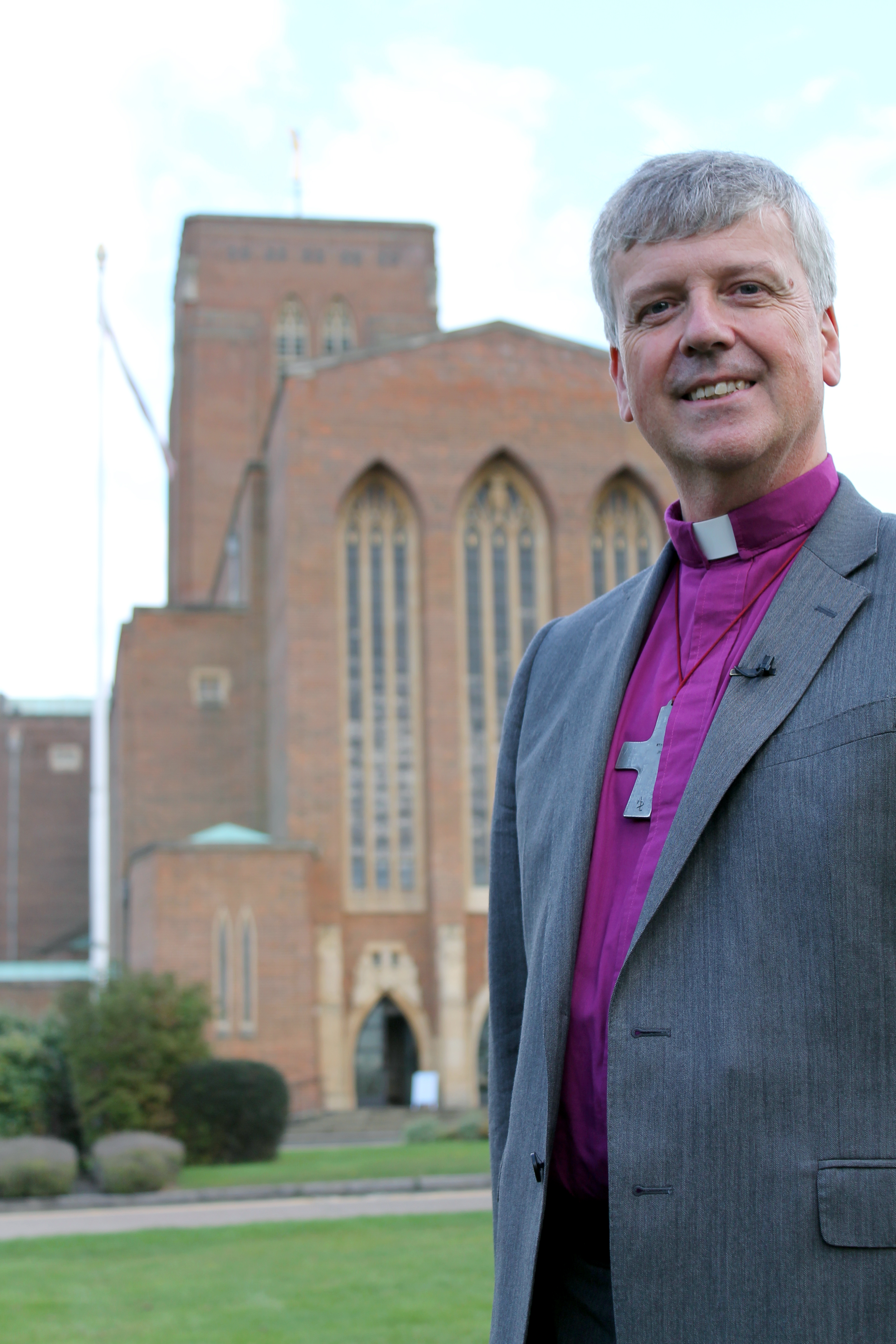
- Late bishop of Guilford, Andrew Watson (1961 – 2026)

Location
- Ecclesiastical province: Canterbury
- Residence: Willow Grange, Jacobs Well

Information
- Established: 1927
- Diocese: Guildford
- Cathedral: Guildford Cathedral

The Bishop of Guildford is the Ordinary of the Church of England Diocese of Guildford in the Province of Canterbury.

The title had first appeared as a suffragan see in the Diocese of Winchester in 1874. The Bishop suffragan of Guildford assisted the Bishop of Winchester in overseeing that diocese. Under George V, the Diocese of Guildford was created out of the north-eastern part of the Diocese of Winchester in 1927.

The diocese covers the western half of the County of Surrey. The see is in the town of Guildford where the seat is located at the Cathedral Church of the Holy Spirit which was built as a cathedral from 1936 to 1965. The bishop's residence is Willow Grange, Jacobs Well — to the north of Guildford.

The immediate past incumbent bishop was Andrew Watson, 10th Bishop of Guildford, from the confirmation of his election on 24 November 2014, until his death 3 March 2026 of pancreatic cancer.

== List of bishops ==
Bishops of Guildford
From	Until	Incumbent	Notes
1927	1934	John Greig	Translated from Gibraltar. Nominated on 1 June and confirmed on 28 June 1927. Resigned in 1934.
1934	1949	John Macmillan	Translated from Dover. Nominated on 19 October and confirmed on 22 November 1934. Resigned on 15 October 1949.
1949	1956	Henry Montgomery Campbell	Translated from Kensington. Nominated on 21 October and confirmed on 23 November 1949. Translated to London on 25 January 1956.
1956	1960	Ivor Watkins	Translated from Malmesbury. Nominated on 25 May and confirmed on 11 July 1956. Died in office on 24 October 1960.
1961	1973	George Reindorp	Nominated on 20 January and consecrated on 25 March 1961. Translated to Salisbury on 15 January 1973.
1973	1982	David Brown	Nominated on 23 July and consecrated on 1 November 1973. Died in office on 13 July 1982.
1983	1994	Michael Adie	Nominated on 5 May and consecrated on 30 June 1983. Retired in 1994.
1994	2004	John Gladwin	Nominated and consecrated in 1994. Translated to Chelmsford in 2004.
2004	2013	Christopher Hill	Translated from Stafford. Nominated and confirmed in 2004.
2014	2026	Andrew Watson	Consecrated Bishop suffragan of Aston in 2008; election confirmed 24 November 2014.
2026	present	Vacant see	

== Assistant bishops ==
Among those who have served as assistant bishops of the diocese have been:

- 1930–1955 (d.): Cyril Golding-Bird, Archdeacon of Dorking (until 1936), then of Surrey (until 1949); former Bishop of Kalgoorlie and of Mauritius
- In 1952, Freddy Hawkes, Bishop suffragan of Kingston, retired to Oxted. He did some bishop's work in retirement, such as an ordination in 1956.
- 1955–1967 (res.): Basil Dale, Rector of Haslemere (1955–1962), full-time assistant bishop (1962–1967) and former Bishop of Jamaica
- 1963–1983 (res.): St John Pike, Vicar of Ewshot (1963–1971), Vicar of Botleys with Lyne and Long Cross (1971–1983) and former Bishop of Gambia and the Rio Pongas
- 1964–1972 (ret.): Lucian Usher-Wilson, Vicar of Churt and former Bishop of Mbale
