= Bossiney (constituency) =

Former UK Parliament constituency

- Former borough constituency for the House of Commons

1552–1832
- Seats: Two
- Replaced by: East Cornwall

Bossiney was a parliamentary constituency in Cornwall, one of a number of Cornish rotten boroughs. It returned two members of Parliament to the British House of Commons from 1552 until it was abolished by the Great Reform Act 1832.

== History ==
Bossiney was one of a number of small parliamentary boroughs established in Cornwall during the Tudor period, and was not a town of any importance even when first enfranchised. The borough consisted of the hamlet of Bossiney itself and the nearby village of Trevena, both in the parish of Tintagel on the North Cornwall coast. Enfranchisement of the two seats of parliament is generally attributed to John Russell, 1st Earl of Bedford in his capacity of Lord Steward of the Duchy of Cornwall.

The right to vote was vested in the mayor and freemen of the borough, collectively called the burgesses; the freedom of the borough was hereditary, passing to the eldest son of any burgess possessing freehold property within the borough. The number of burgesses was always small. In 1816, Oldfield recorded that there were only nine voters, eight of whom belonged to the same family. In 1831, the borough contained only 67 houses, and had a population of 308 with only 25 being entitled to vote.

Like most of the tiny boroughs, Bossiney was completely under the control of its "patrons", who had such influence over the voters that they could in practice choose whoever they wanted as MPs. From the middle of the 18th century, the patrons were the Earl of Mount Edgcumbe and the Wortley family. Usually they chose one member each and, indeed, a formal agreement to that effect, dated 3 July 1752, survives. In Bossiney, the patrons habitually secured their interests by obtaining for the burgesses lucrative appointments in the customs-house at Padstow. In 1758, there was a dispute between Lord Edgcumbe and Samuel Martin, patron of nearby Camelford, over a commissionership of customs that both wanted for one of their constituents; a Camelford man was appointed, and at the election that followed in 1761, Edgcumbe was unable to secure the election of his candidate.

The abuse of government patronage was considered a scandal even in the 18th century, and the Parliament Act 1782 (22 Geo. 3. c. 41) was passed to disqualify the holders of certain posts, including customs officers, from voting. While the new law was not aimed specifically at Bossiney it had a more dramatic effect there than anywhere else: the borough established an unbeatable record at the general election of 1784, when so many of the burgesses were disqualified that there was only a single qualified voter (the vicar, Arthur Wade) to return the two MPs.

Bossiney was disfranchised by the Great Reform Act 1832.

== Members of Parliament ==
=== 1553–1640 ===
- Constituency created (1553 or possibly earlier)

Parliament	First member	Second member
Parliament of 1547–1552	William Carnsew (?)	John Withypoll (?)
First Parliament of 1553	Humphrey Cavill	Edward Grimston
Second Parliament of 1553	Robert Gayer	Robert Beverley
Parliament of 1554	John Beaumont	William Roscarrock
Parliament of 1554–1555	Richard Forset	George Harrison
Parliament of 1555	Ralph Skinner	?
Parliament of 1558	Thomas Stanley	John Kempthorne
Parliament of 1559	Robert Warner	Francis Walsingham
Parliament of 1563–1567	Hugh Owen	Stephen Bradden
Parliament of 1571	Robert Wrothe	George Basset
Parliament of 1572–1581	Francis Kinwellmarsh	Robert Doyly
1581–1584	Francis Bacon	Robert Redge
Parliament of 1584–1585	Sir Francis Drake	John Leveson
Parliament of 1586–1587	William Pool	John Peryam
Parliament of 1588–1589	Henry Savile	John Hender
Parliament of 1593	Thomas Harris	John Hender
Parliament of 1597	Thomas Harris	John Hender
Parliament of Oct. 1597	John Agmondesham	Percival Hart sat for Kent
Parliament of 1601	William Hakewill	Sir Jerome Horsey
Parliament of 1604–1611	George Upton (died); 1609–11 George Calvert	Sir Jerome Horsey
Addled Parliament (1614)	John Wood	Sir Jerome Horsey
Parliament of 1621–1622	John Wood	Anthony Manaton
Happy Parliament (1624–1625)	Sir Richard Weston	Thomas Bevans
Useless Parliament (1625)	Sir Francis Cottington	Jonathan Prideaux
Parliament of 1625–1626	The Lord Lambart	Paul Specot
Parliament of 1628–1629	The Lord Lambart	Richard Edgecumbe
No Parliament summoned 1629–1640

=== 1640–1832 ===
Year	First member	First party	Second member	Second party
April 1640	Edward Herle	Parliamentarian	Anthony Nicholl	Parliamentarian
November 1640	Sir John Clotworthy	Parliamentarian	Sir Christopher Yelverton	Parliamentarian
1641 (?)	Sir Ralph Sydenham	Royalist	Sir Christopher Yelverton	Parliamentarian
September 1642	Sydenham disabled from sitting - seat vacant		Sir Christopher Yelverton	Parliamentarian
1647	Lionel Copley			
December 1648	Copley excluded in Pride's Purge - seat vacant		Yelverton not known to have sat after Pride's Purge	
1653	Bossiney was unrepresented in the Barebones Parliament and the First and Second Parliaments of the Protectorate			
January 1659	Thomas Povey		Samuel Trelawney	
May 1659	Not represented in the restored Rump			
April 1660	Francis Gerard		Charles Pym	
June 1660	Francis Gerard		Sir William Brereton	
1661	Robert Robartes		Richard Rous	
1673	Robert Robartes		Francis Robartes	
February 1679	William Coryton		John Tregagle	
October 1679	Charles Robartes		Narcissus Luttrell	
1681	Charles Robartes		Sir Peter Colleton	
1685	John Cotton		John Mounsteven	
1689	Sir Peter Colleton		Humphrey Nicoll	
1690	Sir Peter Colleton		Samuel Travers	
1694	Humphrey Nicoll		Samuel Travers	
1695	George Booth		John Manley	
1698	Sir John Pole		John Tregagle	
January 1701	Francis Robartes		John Tregagle	
March 1701	Thomas Watson-Wentworth		John Tregagle	
December 1701	Sir John Molesworth	Tory	John Manley	
1702	William Hooker		John Manley	
1705	Sir Simon Harcourt	Tory	John Manley	
1708	Samuel Travers		Francis Foote	
October 1710	Francis Robartes		John Manley	
December 1710	Henry Campion		John Manley	
1713	Sir William Pole		John Manley	
1714	Sir William Pole		Paul Orchard	
1715	Henry Cartwright		Samuel Molyneux	
1722	Robert Corker		Henry Kelsall	
1727	Robert Corker		John Hedges	
1731	James Cholmondeley		John Hedges	
1734	The Viscount Palmerston		Townshend Andrews	
1737	The Viscount Palmerston		Peregrine Poulett	
May 1741	Richard Liddell		Thomas Foster	
December 1741	John Sabine		Christopher Tower	
1742	Richard Liddell		Thomas Foster	
1746	William Breton		Thomas Foster	
July 1747	Edward Wortley	Whig	Richard Heath	
December 1747	William Ord		Richard Heath	
1752	William Ord		William Montagu	
1754	Edwin Sandys		Edward Wortley Montagu	
1761	John Richmond Webb	Tory	Edward Wortley Montagu	
1766	John Stuart	Tory	Edward Wortley Montagu	
1768	John Stuart	Tory	Henry Luttrell	Tory
1769	John Stuart	Tory	Sir George Osborn	
1774	John Stuart	Tory	Hon. Henry Luttrell	Tory
1776	Hon. Charles Stuart		Hon. Henry Luttrell	Tory
1784	Hon. Charles Stuart		Bamber Gascoigne (senior)	
1786	Hon. Charles Stuart		Matthew Montagu	
1790	Hon. James Archibald Stuart		Humphrey Minchin	
April 1796	Hon. James Archibald Stuart		Hon. Evelyn Pierrepont	
May 1796	John Stuart-Wortley		John Lubbock	
1797	Hon. James Stuart-Wortley	Tory	John Lubbock	
1802	Hon. James Stuart-Wortley	Tory	John Hiley Addington	Tory
1803	Hon. James Stuart-Wortley	Tory	George Holford	
1806	Hon. James Stuart-Wortley	Tory	Henry Baring	
1807	Hon. James Stuart-Wortley	Tory	Peter Thellusson	Tory
1808	Hon. James Stuart-Wortley	Tory	John Otway Cuffe	Tory
1817	Hon. James Stuart-Wortley	Tory	William Yates Peel	Tory
1818	Hon. James Stuart-Wortley	Tory	Sir Compton Domvile	
1819	Hon. John Ward	Tory	Sir Compton Domvile	
1823	John Stuart-Wortley	Tory	Sir Compton Domvile	
1826	John Stuart-Wortley	Tory	Edward Rose Tunno	Tory
1830	Charles James Stuart-Wortley	Tory	Edward Rose Tunno	Tory
1831	John Stuart-Wortley	Tory	Edward Rose Tunno	Tory
1832	Constituency abolished			

== Election results ==
=== Elections in the 1830s ===
General election, 2 May 1831: Bossiney
Party	Candidate	Votes	%
Tory	John Stuart-Wortley	Unopposed	
Tory	Edward Rose Tunno	Unopposed	
Registered electors		c. 25	
Tory hold			
Tory hold			

By-election, 16 February 1831: Bossiney
Party	Candidate	Votes	%
Tory	John Stuart-Wortley	Unopposed	
Registered electors		c. 25	
Tory hold			

- Caused by Stuart-Wortley's resignation

General election, 31 July 1830: Bossiney
Party	Candidate	Votes	%
Tory	Charles Stuart-Wortley	Unopposed	
Tory	Edward Rose Tunno	Unopposed	
Tory hold			
Tory hold			
