= William Ord =

William Ord may refer to:

- William Ord (1781–1855), English politician and landowner, MP for Morpeth, and for Newcastle-upon-Tyne
- William Henry Ord (1803–1838), his son, MP for Newport
- William Ord of Fenham (c. 1715–1768), English land and mine owner, MP for Bossiney
- William Miller Ord (1834–1902), British medical scientist
