= Christopher Unwin =

English archdeacon (1917–2004)

Christopher Philip Unwin (27 September 1917; 21 December 2004) was the Archdeacon of Northumberland from 1963 to 1982.

Unwin was educated at Repton School; Magdalene College, Cambridge; and Queen's Theological College, Birmingham. He was ordained deacon in 1940, and priest in 1941. He served curacies in Benwell and Sugley; and incumbencies in Horton and Benwell.

Church of England titles
| Preceded by Ian White-Thomson | Archdeacon of Northumberland; 1963–1982 | Succeeded by William Jordison Thomas |
