= Thomas Turner (dean of Canterbury) =

English Royalist churchman

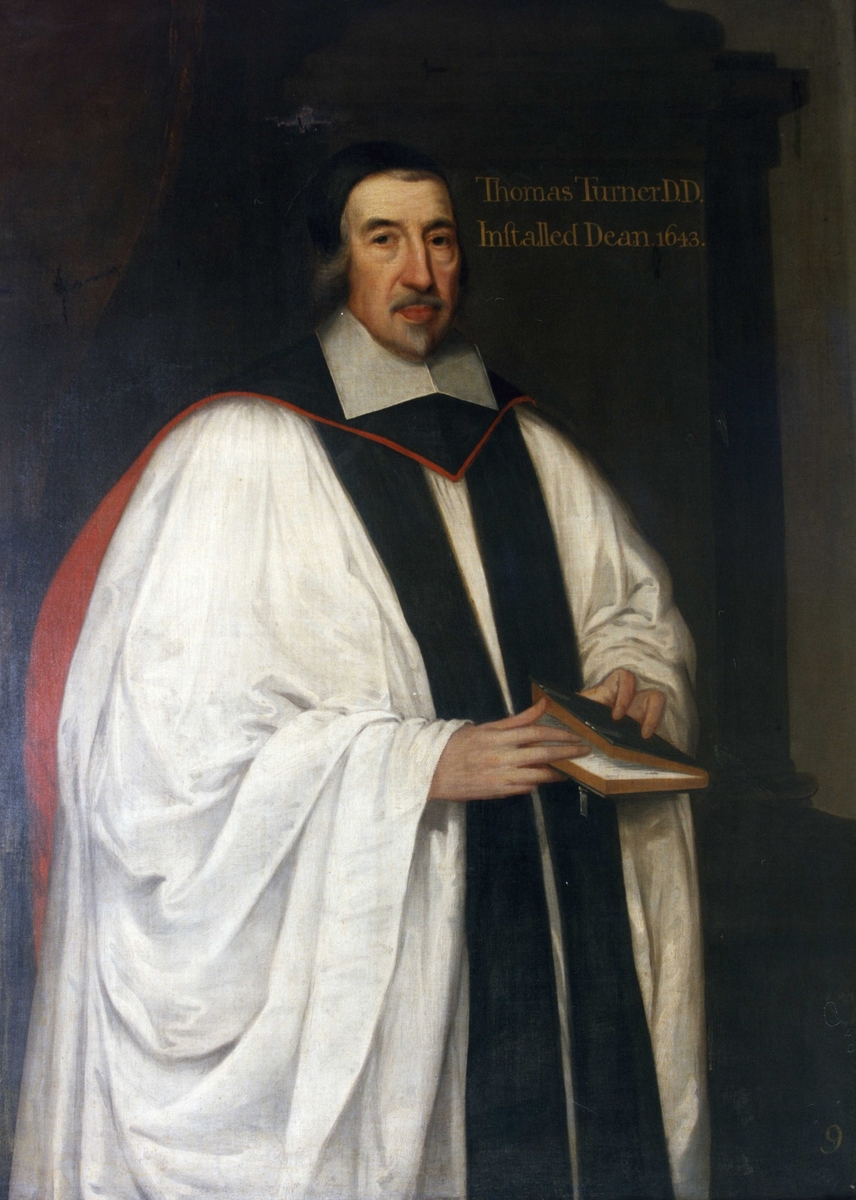
Thomas Turner (1591–1672), Dean of Canterbury (1643–1672)

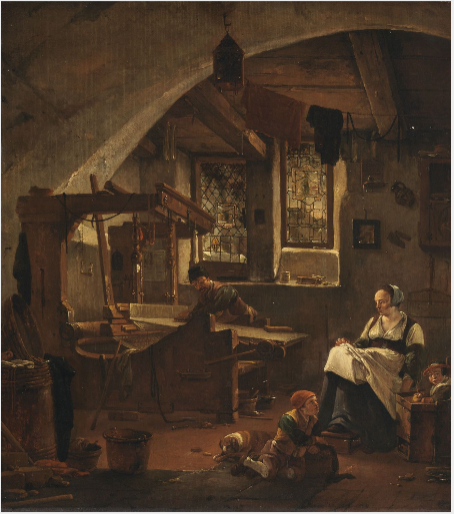

Thomas Turner (1591 – 8 October 1672) was an English royalist churchman and Dean of Canterbury.

== Life ==
Turner was born at Reading, Berkshire in 1591, the son of Thomas Turner of Heckfield in Hampshire, mayor of Reading. He matriculated at St. John's College, Oxford, on 26 June 1610, graduating B.A. on 6 June 1614 and M.A. on 9 May 1618. He was elected a fellow, took the degree of B.D. on 20 July 1624, and was created D.D. on 1 April 1633. In 1623 he was presented by his college to the vicarage of St Giles' Church, Oxford, which he held with his fellowship, but relinquished in 1629. William Laud, when Bishop of London, made him his chaplain.

On 7 January 1628 Turner was appointed a member of the commission for ecclesiastical causes; and on 14 April 1629 Laud collated him to the prebend of Newington in St. Paul's Cathedral. On 29 October following he was collated chancellor of London, and soon after was appointed chaplain in ordinary to the king. He was briefly rector of St Mary's, Ashwell. In May 1631 he obtained the rectory of St. Augustine-in-the-Gate, but exchanged it on 10 November for that of Southwark. In 1633 he accompanied Charles I in his Scottish coronation progress, and on 17 December of the same year his name appears in the commission for exercising ecclesiastical jurisdiction in England and Wales. On 11 November 1634 he was instituted rector of Fetcham; on 31 December 1638 he and John Juxon received from the king the lease of the prebend and rectory of Aylesbury for five years; and 16 February 1642 he was nominated Dean of Rochester. On 3 January 1644 he was constituted Dean of Canterbury, in name only since Kent was in the hands of Parliament. He adhered to the king with great devotion, and attended him at Hampton Court and during his imprisonment in the Isle of Wight. During the parliamentary ascendency and in the time of the Commonwealth he was harassed and deprived of his benefices. Three of his houses were plundered, his books seized, and he himself arrested at Fetcham by a party of horse for having sent money to the king. He was dragged away while holding divine service and carried to the White Lion Prison in Southwark.

At the Restoration he regained his Surrey rectories, and entered into possession of the deanery of Canterbury. Shortly after he resigned the rectory of Fetcham. Dying on 8 October 1672, he was buried in the Dean's Chapel in Canterbury Cathedral, where a mural monument was erected to his memory.

== Family ==
He married Margaret, daughter of Sir Francis Windebank. By her he had three sons: Francis Turner; Thomas Turner (1645–1714), president of Corpus Christi College, Oxford; and William Turner (1647–1685), Archdeacon of Northumberland.

Church of England titles
Preceded by George Aglionby	Dean of Canterbury; 1643-1672	Succeeded by John Tillotson
