= Robert Beverley =

Robert Beverley may refer to:

- Robert Beverley Sr. (1635–1687), clerk of the House of Burgesses, major landowner and father of Robert Beverley Jr.
- Robert Beverley Jr. (1673–1722), burgess and historian of early colonial Virginia
- Robert G. Beverly (1925–2009), member of the California legislature
- Robert Mackenzie Beverley (1798–1868), author, magistrate and controversialist
- Robert of Beverley (died 1285), mason and sculptor
- Robert Beverley (MP) (by 1522–1558/63), member of parliament (MP) for Mitchell and Bossiney
