= Withypoll =

Withypoll may refer to:

- John Withypoll (c. 1483–15??), English politician
- Paul Withypoll, (c.1485–1547), English merchant and politician
- Elizabeth Withypoll (1510–1537), English calligrapher, daughter of Paul Withypoll
- Edmund Withypoll (c.1510–1583), English politician, son of Paul Withypoll

== See also ==
- Withypool
