= Thomas Singleton =

Thomas Singleton may refer to:

- Thomas Singleton (academic) (1552–1614), Vice-Chancellor of the University of Oxford
- Thomas Singleton (priest) (1783–1842), Archdeacon of Northumberland
- Thomas D. Singleton (died 1833), US Representative from South Carolina
- Tommy Singleton (1940–2005), English footballer
- Thomas Singleton (1949-present), Priest
