= Charles Ritchie (priest) =

Anglican clergyman (1887–1958)

Charles Henry Ritchie
- Born: 28 May 1887
- Died: 8 September 1958 (aged 71); Polzeath, Cornwall
- Education: Wanganui Collegiate School; St John's College, Cambridge; Leeds Clergy School
- Spouse: Marjorie Alice Stewart
- Children: 2 sons
- Parent(s): John Macfarlane Ritchie and Ella Ritchie
- Religion: Anglican
- Ordained: 1911 (deacon); 1912 (priest)
- Offices held: Rector of St John's, Edinburgh; Archdeacon of Northumberland
- Title: The Reverend Canon

Charles Henry Ritchie (1887–1958) was an Anglican clergyman who served in the Church of England the Anglican Church of Aotearoa New Zealand and Polynesia and the Scottish Episcopal Church.

== Life ==
Born on 28 May 1887, he was the youngest son of John Macfarlane Ritchie and Ella Ritchie, of Dunedin, New Zealand. He was educated at Wanganui Collegiate School, Wanganui, New Zealand; St John's College, Cambridge (B.A. 1910; M.A. 1914); and Leeds Clergy School (1910). He was ordained in the Anglican ministry as a deacon in 1911 and a priest in 1912. His first pastoral appointment was a curate at St. Michael's Church, Chester Square, London, 1911–14. In 1915, he married Marjorie Alice Stewart, youngest daughter of Sir Charles and Lady Mary Stewart. During the First World War, he served as an acting chaplain for temporary service in the Royal Navy, 1914–19. After the war, he was briefly a curate at All Saints' Church, Dunedin, New Zealand, 1920–22, before returning to England where was a curate at St Martin-in-the-Fields, London, 1922–27. He served as the Rector of St John's, Edinburgh, 1927–39, and a canon of St Mary's Cathedral, Edinburgh, 1937–39. He was then Archdeacon of Northumberland, 1939–54, and a canon of St Nicholas' Cathedral, Newcastle upon Tyne, 1939–54. Followed by as a canon of St George's Chapel, Windsor, 1954–58. He also served as a chaplain to King George VI and then to Queen Elizabeth II, and a chaplain to Heathfield School, Ascot. He died in Polzeath, Cornwall on 8 September 1958, aged 71.

== Notes ==
Scottish Episcopal Church titles
Preceded by James Geoffrey Gordon	Rector of St John's, Edinburgh; 1927 – 1939	Succeeded by Sidney Harvie-Clark
Church of England titles
Preceded by Leslie Stannard Hunter	Archdeacon of Northumberland; 1939 – 1954	Succeeded by Ian Hugh White-Thomson
