= Blackett-Ord =

Blackett-Ord is an English surname. Rev. John Alexander Blackett (1803–1865), Rector of Wolsingham and youngest son of Christopher Blackett, was the first member of the Blackett family to adopt this surname.

== People ==
- Charles Blackett-Ord (1858–1931), Archdeacon of Northumberland
- Jim Blackett-Ord (1921–2012), British barrister and judge

== See also ==
- Blackett
- Ord (surname)
