= The Angelou Centre =

British charitable organization

The Angelou Centre is a charity in the West End of Newcastle in the North East of England, UK. It provides Black, Asian, minority ethnic and refugee women with training, personal development, counselling, legal advice for immigration and domestic violence.

== History ==
The Angelou Centre was founded by a collective of women activists and social workers in 1993. The director is Umme Imam, who has previously taught Community and Youth Work at Durham University, and is committed to highlighting the intersections of race and gender.

== Aims ==
The centre and its team of support workers, counselors, trainers, facilitators and volunteers provides women with skills training, personal development, employability support and access to welfare. The aim is to provide services to enable women to overcome barriers and achieve economic independence. The Angelou Centre organises meetings and protests to raise awareness of global issues around discrimination, while also organising celebrations, religious festivals, social groups and facilitating informal peer mentoring. The centre co-ordinates the heritage project BAM! Sistahood!, which focuses on the past and present achievements and experiences of Black, Asian, minority ethnic and refugee women in North East England.
