= Edward Wortley Montagu =

Edward Wortley Montagu may refer to:

- Edward Wortley Montagu (diplomat) (1678−1761), English diplomat, father of the following
- Edward Wortley Montagu (traveller) (1713−1776), English traveller and author, son of the above
