= Ord (surname) =

Ord is a surname. Notable people with the surname include:

- Boris Ord (1897–1961), British composer
- Edward Ord (1818–1883), Major General in the US Army
- George Ord (1781–1866), American naturalist, ornithologist and writer
- Harry Ord (1819–1885), the 10th Governor of Western Australia
- John Ord (1729–1814), English politician
- Robert Ord (1700–1778), British lawyer and politician
- Toby Ord (born 1979), Australian philosopher
- William Ord (1781–1855), English politician and landowner, MP for Morpeth, and for Newcastle-upon-Tyne
- William Ord of Fenham (c. 1715–1768), English land and mine owner, MP for Bossiney
- William Miller Ord (1834–1902), British medical scientist
