= Edward Bigge =

Edward Thomas Bigge (19 October 1807 – 3 April 1844) was an English cleric, the first appointee to the revived role of Archdeacon of Lindisfarne.

He was the son of Charles William Bigge, educated at University College, Oxford and ordained in 1834. A Fellow of Merton College, Oxford, he was only an Archdeacon for two years.

Church of England titles
Preceded by Inaugural appointment	Archdeacon of Lindisfarne; 1842–1844	Succeeded by George Bland
