= John Wood (MP for Bossiney) =

English politician (died 1623)

John Wood (died 24 December 1623) was an English politician, elected MP for Bossiney in the parliaments of 1614 and 1621.

He served as a JP in Cornwall from 1617 until his death.
