= Francis Bunney =

English Anglican priest

Francis Bunney (b Newland 8 May 1543; d Ryton 16 April 1617) was an English Anglican priest in the 16th century.

Bunney was educated at Magdalen College, Oxford, of which he became a Fellow in 1661. He became a Canon of Carlisle Cathedral in 1572; Archdeacon of Northumberland in 1574; and Rector of Ryton in 1579, holding all three positions until his death.
