= William Forbes Raymond =

William Forbes Raymond (born William Forbes) was Archdeacon of Northumberland from 1842 to 1853.

The only son of Lieutenant-Colonel William Forbes, Deputy Adjutant-General to the Forces in Ireland, he was educated at Charterhouse and Trinity College, Cambridge. He was Rector of Strethall before his Archdeacon's appointment; and died in retirement on 21 March 1860.

Church of England titles
Preceded by Thomas Singleton	Archdeacon of Northumberland; 1842–1853	Succeeded by George Bland
