= Charles Blackett-Ord =

Archdeacon of Northumberland from 1917 to 1931

Charles Edward Blackett-Ord, (16 September 1858 – 16 July 1931) was Archdeacon of Northumberland from 1917 to 1931.

Born in Grosvenor Square, London into an ecclesiastical family on 16 September 1858, Blackett-Ord was educated at Marlborough College and Corpus Christi College, Oxford. He was ordained deacon in 1882 and priest the following year and began his career with curacies in South Shields and Ryton. He held incumbencies at Ovingham, Newburn, Stamfordham and Rothbury before his Archdeacon’s appointment. He was appointed honorary chaplain to the Northumberland Hussars, a Yeomanry regiment based in Newcastle upon Tyne, on 23 August 1902.

A keen amateur cricketer, Blackett-Ord died in post on 16 July 1931.

He married twice: firstly in 1887, Mary Delaval the only daughter of the Rev. Thomas Henry Chester, Rector of Ryton, with whom he had one daughter; and secondly in 1927, Grace Marcia, daughter of the Rev. Dixon Dixon Brown.

Church of England titles
Preceded by James Henderson	Archdeacon of Northumberland; 1917–1931	Succeeded by Leslie Stannard Hunter
