= British industrial mission =

Network of people

British industrial mission is a network of people who engage in christian ministry to people in economic life. This is often done by lay or ordained chaplains who build relationships with people in workplaces. They may also take part in support or campaigning roles for economic justice, such as for a living wage, protection for precarious workers or assisting people facing redundancy. In workplaces the chaplains may have a role in staff welfare, or facilitating faith provision. The intention of these faith actors (predominantly from Christian denominations), is to establish an engagement between the church and the world of work, money and employment. Chaplains form relationships with local employers and visit workplaces on a regular basis and also use their experience to help churches to understand and respond to the needs and issues. Their role is not to try to convert employees but to establish a dialogue between employers, employees and the church and provide a religious presence in the workplace. Chaplains are often independent of the business owners, and offer confidentiality.

== History ==
The history of industrial mission in Britain is strongly associated with the city of Sheffield, where the first industrial mission team was established in 1944. Bishop Leslie Hunter, Bishop of Sheffield, was concerned that the Church of England had been losing touch with people in the industrialised cities during the inter-war years, and sent the Revd. Ted Wickham into factories to engage with workers. This mission was well received by working people, and the Sheffield Industrial Mission was set up under Ted Wickham's direction. The purpose of Wickam’s role was to address the ‘problem’ of the progressive estrangement of the working classes from the church which had adversely affected church attendance since the industrial revolution, particularly in industrial cities like Sheffield. Wickham sought to build and sustain an engagement with the working population by visiting steelworks and other heavy industries. His style was participatory. He and his chaplains made regular factory visits engaging people in informal conversation and holding formal break-time discussions about issues of importance to them. The Sheffield model involved development of a theology and set of methods that provided a template which was followed by mission teams in other parts of the country.

In 1959 the Industrial Mission Association was formed with the intention of ensuring the ongoing development of industrial mission. At its height during the late 1970s it is estimated there were 115 full-time and 175 part-time clergy engaged in industrial chaplaincy in Britain and most industrial towns had some form of industrial mission activity. However, deindustrialization and in particular the loss of heavy industries such as mining and shipbuilding where industrial mission traditionally focussed its attention led in the 1980s to the development of a more issue-based approach that sought to give voice to the unemployed. Chaplains were also forced to look to other sites of economic activity such as shopping centres and airports as potential locations for their industrial missionary activities.

== Current activity ==
Given the changing Dynamics of the economy, with economic activity moving away from traditional industry to consumer and service industries, the Industrial Mission Association changed its name to Workplace Chaplaincy Mission UK in 2018. At that time the organisation had a membership of about 500 chaplains across the UK, in about 20 different regional teams. But it is not possible to be precise as to the number of industrial or workplace chaplains currently attached to workplaces in Britain because industrial mission teams operate on a local geographical basis and arrangements for workplace visiting are usually made by one or several chaplains who usually negotiate access by contacting a manager in a workplace they wish to visit.

Industrial mission has traditionally resisted charging a fee to organisations for their services and the scarcity of church funding has led to a decline in the number of paid industrial mission posts. But there has been a large rise in the number of volunteer chaplains; and new Chaplaincy teams are regularly emerging across the UK. For financial support some teams now request donations from businesses or enter financial agreements in exchange for their services.

Some indication of current levels of activity can be gained from the various industrial mission team websites (see External Links) which illustrate the continuation of their work in the UK. Although there are some societal trends towards secularization and multiculturalism, there is also a growth in permitted religious observance in the workplace (many workplaces now offer staff prayer rooms) and an increasing request for assistance from HR functions in business for softer, emotional well-being resources.

So workplace Chaplaincy has recently been a resurgence in demand in many places. Since there continues to be a decline in the proportion of the British workforce that associates with Christianity and a growth in the proportion who identify with other religions, such as Hinduism, Islam and Sikhism, some Chaplaincy teams are becoming multi-faith.

Workplace Chaplaincy teams are also becoming more diverse in the sorts of businesses and organisations they relate to: transport, retail, public sector, manufacturing, service industry, emergency services, arts, voluntary sector, town centres...

Industrial mission is related to workplace chaplaincy which exists in countries such as the United States. See for example the National Institute of Business and Industrial Chaplains, Marketplace Ministries and the Australian Inter-Church Trade and Industry Mission.

== See also ==
- Labor relations
