= King's Scholar =

Scholarship holder at certain British schools and colleges

A King's Scholar (abbreviated KS in the United Kingdom) is the recipient of a scholarship established by, or under the auspices of, a British monarch. The scholarships are awarded at certain public schools and colleges in England, including Eton College; The King's School, Canterbury; King's Ely; The King's School, Worcester; Durham School; and Westminster School. At Westminster, the title will be King's or Queen's Scholar depending on the gender of the reigning monarch.

== Historical origins ==
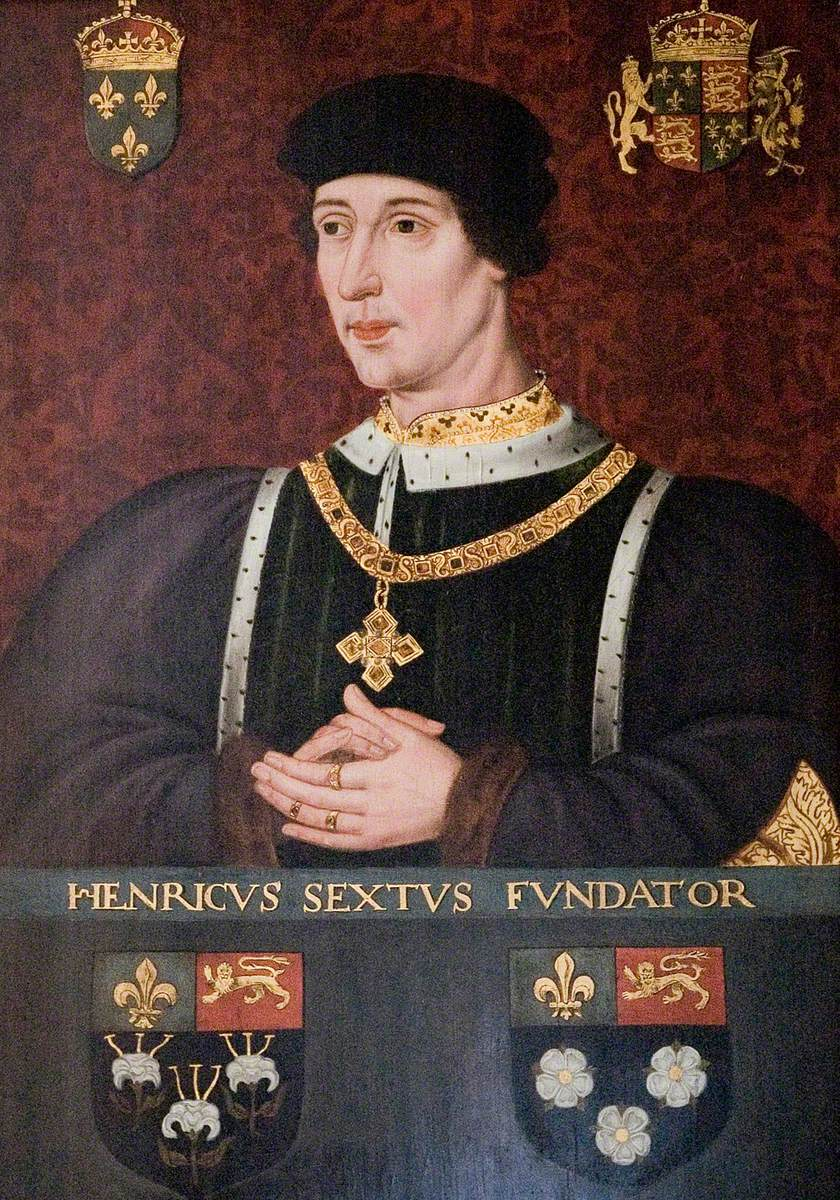
Henry VI, who founded Eton College

On 7 July 1317, King Edward II established the first King's Scholars at the University of Cambridge. On that date, a writ was sent from the king to the sheriff of Cambridgeshire stating that 12 boys from his household were being sent to study at Cambridge under the care of a master, and that the sheriff was to pay their expenses from the money he collected on the king's behalf.

In 1440, King Henry VI established Eton College, originally known as the King's College of our Lady of Eton beside Windsor, as a charity school providing an education free of charge to "poor, scholarly boys". Starting in 1443, the number of King's Scholars was increased to 70 students who were housed in the central College building. Fee-paying students who were not King's Scholars stayed in boarding houses in the town (Latin: oppidum) of Eton, and thus became known as Oppidans.

== King's Scholars at Eton College ==
At Eton College, a King's Scholar (known as a "Colleger" or colloquially as a "tug") is one who has passed the College Election examination and has been awarded a Foundation Scholarship and admitted into a house known as "College", the premises of which are situated within the original ancient purpose-built college buildings. It is the original and oldest Eton house (strictly speaking it was established before the house system developed at Eton, for use by Oppidans) and consists solely of King's Scholars ranging in age from 13 to 18. At any one time there are about 70 King's Scholars, who are distinguished by the wearing of a black academic gown over the usual school uniform of a tail-coat.

The gown is said to be the basis of the traditional nickname given to Collegers of "tugs", from the Latin Gens Togata, i.e. "toga'd people".

As the college's statutes provide for 70 King's Scholars, who remain in College for five years, about 14 are admitted per year (a "block" in Eton argot), at the age of 13. They share most aspects of school life with the Oppidans, including lessons and most sport. However they eat all their meals in College Hall, which has hosted many distinguished guests in its long history including Queen Elizabeth I, and are privy to certain ancient formal traditions not practised by Oppidans. One other difference is that Collegers usually play the Wall Game in the winter term for the full five years, while Oppidans tend to play it only in their last year.

Collegers live in the original ancient central area of the school, either overlooking or in close proximity to School Yard, bounded by Eton College Chapel and Lupton's Tower, with the Founder's Statue in its centre. The boarding house in which Collegers live includes Chamber, the older section, with rooms looking into School Yard, and New Buildings, on the reverse side, which contains the majority of the boys' rooms.

Historically a Foundation Scholarship used to provide full and unconditional waiver of all the school fees, but since the 1960s the scholarship has been increasingly subjected to means testing. As of 2021 a scholarship does not affect the size of fees. However part or all of the fees may be waived, dependent on financial circumstances.

King's Scholars have the post-nominal letters KS appended to their surnames in the school lists. Oppidans who have distinguished themselves academically, but who may have elected not to become Collegers, are called Oppidan Scholars, and similarly have OS attached to their surnames in the school lists, but receive no financial benefit and are distinguished in no other way from other Oppidans.

=== Notable Eton King's Scholars ===
- James Arbuthnot (politician)
- Robert Armstrong, Baron Armstrong of Ilminster (civil servant)
- Neal Ascherson (journalist)
- A. J. Ayer (philosopher)
- Michael Beloff (barrister)
- Eric Blair (writer, known as George Orwell)
- Jamie Borwick, Baron Borwick (industrialist)
- Oscar Browning (educationalist)
- James Buchan (novelist and historian)
- Henry Chadwick (theologian)
- Cyril Connolly (writer and critic)
- Armand D'Angour (classicist)
- Scrope Berdmore Davies (scholar)
- Claude Aurelius Elliott (educationalist)
- Ralph Dominic Gamble (army officer)
- Bamber Gascoigne (broadcaster and quiz host)
- Lewis Gielgud (intelligence officer)
- Timothy Gowers (mathematician)
- J. B. S. Haldane (biologist)
- Henry Hitchings (writer)
- Douglas Hogg (lawyer and politician)
- Douglas Hurd (politician)
- Aldous Huxley (novelist)
- Julian Huxley (biologist)
- Pico Iyer (writer)
- M. R. James (writer and academic administrator)
- Boris Johnson (Prime Minister of the United Kingdom)
- John Maynard Keynes (economist)
- Homi Kharas (economist)
- William King (priest) (clergyman)
- Kwasi Kwarteng (politician and historian)
- Stanley Mordaunt Leathes (historian and civil servant)
- George Leggatt (judge)
- Anthony Lloyd, Baron Lloyd of Berwick (judge)
- Constantine Louloudis (rower)
- Harold Macmillan (Prime Minister of the United Kingdom)
- Noel Malcolm (writer)
- James Manners (steppe explorer, naturist)
- David Maxwell (rower)
- Robin Milner (computer scientist)
- Charles Moore, Baron Moore of Etchingham (journalist)
- John Paul Morrison (software developer)
- Henry Moseley (physicist)
- Ferdinand Mount (journalist)
- Roger Mynors (classical scholar)
- David Natzler (civil servant)
- Adam Nicolson (writer)
- Simon P. Norton (mathematician)
- Cuthbert Ottaway (footballer)
- Raymond Paley (mathematician)
- Richard Porson (classical scholar)
- Derek Prince (Christian teacher)
- Arthur Rhys Davids (First World War aviation officer)
- Steven Runciman (historian)
- Conrad Russell (historian and politician)
- Andrew Sinclair (novelist and historian)
- James Kenneth Stephen (poet)
- Martin Taylor (businessman)
- Frank Turner (singer-songwriter)
- Robert Walpole (Prime Minister of the United Kingdom)
- Peter Warlock (composer)
- Stephen Wolfram (computer scientist)
- Patrick Wormald (historian)

== King's and Queen's Scholars at Westminster School ==
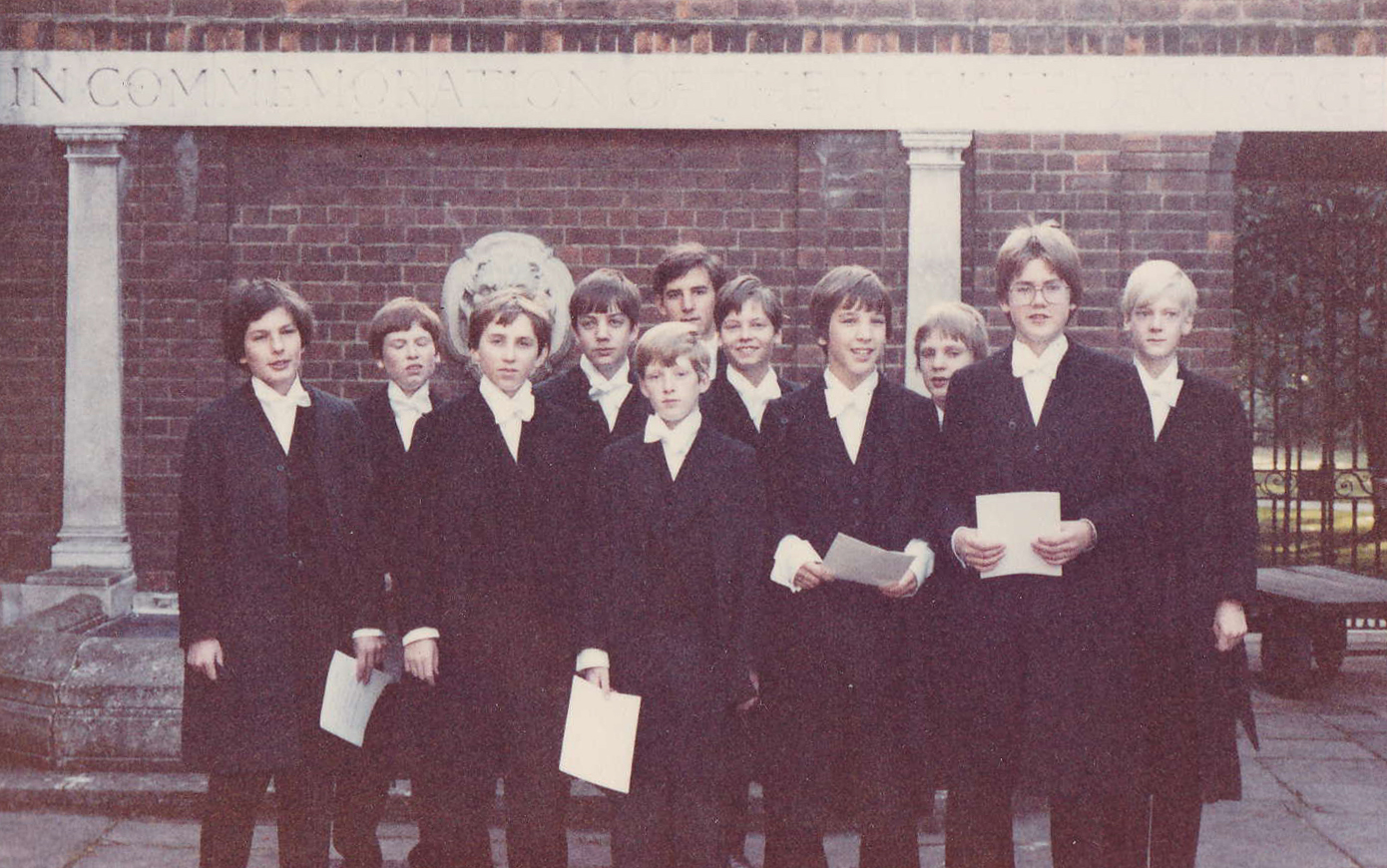
Queen's Scholars, Westminster School, 1981

The foundation scholars at Westminster School are called Queen's Scholars when there is a reigning Queen and King's Scholars when there is a reigning King. As at Eton, they are selected by competitive examination ("The Challenge"), board at the oldest house in the school, known as College, and wear gowns during school Abbey services in Westminster Abbey.

== King's Scholars at King's College Cambridge ==
The term King's Scholar is also used for undergraduates at King's College Cambridge who obtain first-class degrees. They receive a prize of £350, and are entitled to attend a ceremony in the King's College Chapel at which they sign their name in the King's Scholar book. A three-course formal dinner is held in the subsequent Michaelmas term, during which scholars dine for free with their respective Directors of Studies (DoS). The only time when scholars are not entitled to attend this ceremony is if they attain a first-class degree in their final year.

This is a historical hang-over from scholarships endowed by the college's founder (King's College Cambridge and Eton College were both founded by Henry VI, and are sister colleges).

== King's Scholars at the King's Schools ==
The seven King's Schools at Canterbury, Chester, Ely, Gloucester, Peterborough, Rochester and Worcester were re-endowed or re-founded by King Henry VIII in 1541 following the Dissolution of the Monasteries, and award King's Scholarships in his name. Originally all pupils at the King's Schools were endowment-funded King's Scholars; the King's Schools now generally award the King's Scholarship in recognition of academic or musical attainment, and the Scholarship is often accompanied by a discount on school fees. By statute of Queen Elizabeth II, the King's Schools were granted the right to award Queen's Scholarships in 1973, both in recognition of the reigning Queen, and because many of the King's Schools, previously all single-sex schools, were moving towards co-education at the time.

=== King's Ely ===
King's Ely awarded King's Scholarships to twelve boys every year until 1973 when Queen Elizabeth II requested for the scholarship to be awarded to high achieving girls as well, in conjunction with her visit to the school. Thus, every year, twelve girls and boys from the lower sixth are awarded the scholarship based on the grades achieved at GCSE with most scholars achieving over eight grade '9's. The admission of scholars is carried out at a special service of choral evensong every September in Ely Cathedral. During this, the Scholars are admitted as members of the Cathedral foundation and sign their names in a special book. Every year the scholars participate in one of King's Ely's oldest traditions, the annual "Hoop Trundle". Essentially, after the annual prizegiving service in the cathedral, the scholars trundle hoops along the cathedral's east lawn in a race. The tradition derives from when centuries ago, one of the privileges of being a King's scholar was the right to be able to play games in cathedral and college grounds. King's scholars wear a red gown over their uniform during school services in the cathedral and are awarded special red ties with small golden crowns on them. They are also entitled to several other privileges:

- Former scholars can marry in Ely Cathedral
- Are members of the Ely Cathedral foundation for life
- They can be buried within the grounds of Ely Cathedral

=== King's School, Canterbury ===
At the King's School Canterbury, King's Scholars are students who have taken the scholarship exam on entry or achieved exceptional grades in their GCSE, usually more than 9 A*. In previous years they wore gowns over their uniforms, a privilege now reserved for "purples" the heads of houses, captain and vice captain of school and head scholar. Now all academic scholars have a white gown, worn to cathedral services. This is received at a special service in the cathedral where the scholars are admitted to the society. They also gain the right to walk down the aisle at cathedral services first. Scholars do also have the right to wear scholar jumpers, which are the same as the school black ones with a white stripe around the collar and hem. Scholars are entitled to several traditional privileges:

- Former KSs can marry in the crypt of Canterbury Cathedral
- They can be buried within the grounds of Canterbury Cathedral

See also the Traditions of King's School Canterbury.

=== King's School, Worcester ===
At the King's School, Worcester, the King's Scholarship is the highest scholarship awarded. It is awarded on the basis of academic or musical attainment, and typically accompanies a reduction in school fees. King's Scholars are generally appointed in the Lower Remove (year 9) on the basis of exam results and an interview, or in the Lower Sixth (year 12) on the basis of attainment up to GCSE. All scholars appointed in the Lower Remove are titled King's Scholars, regardless of their gender or of the reigning monarch, in honour of Henry VIII; male scholars appointed in the Lower Sixth are also titled King's Scholars; female scholars appointed in the Lower Sixth are titled Queen's Scholars in honour of Elizabeth II. New King's Scholars are initiated into the Worcester Cathedral Foundation in the first evensong service of the academic year where they are presented to the dean and bishop of Worcester Cathedral by the headmaster of the school.

King's and Queen's Scholars are members of the foundation of Worcester Cathedral, and wear a white surplice over their uniform during major school services. The Senior Scholar, who is appointed from among the King's and Queen's Scholars in the Upper Sixth (year 13), has the job of co-ordinating the scholars. In an annual ceremony, the Senior Scholar proceeds to Worcester Crown Court, to demand from the presiding judge, in Latin, a day's holiday for the school, known as Judge's Day. He or she is entitled to be married in the cathedral and buried within the cathedral grounds, and is also theoretically entitled to graze a sheep and a goat on College Green.
