= Ord's thyroiditis =

Ord's disease
- Specialty: Endocrinology

Ord's thyroiditis is an atrophic form of chronic thyroiditis, an autoimmune disease where the body's own antibodies fight the cells of the thyroid.

It is named after the physician, William Miller Ord, who first described it in 1877 and again in 1888. It is more common among women than men. It has historically been separated from Hashimoto's Thyroiditis which presents with goiters, however some argue they each represent extremes of the same disease and should be classified together as a combined "Ord-Hashimoto’s disease".

== Signs and symptoms ==
The first sign of Ord's thyroiditis is the atrophy of the thyroid gland from the start this can be identified by ultrasound. Another sign to help identify this disease is the presence of blocking anti-TSH receptors. Ord's thyroiditis can share symptoms with functional hypothyroidism.

== Pathophysiology ==
Physiologically, antibodies to thyroid peroxidase and/or thyroglobulin cause gradual destruction of follicles in the thyroid gland. Accordingly, the disease can be detected clinically by looking for these antibodies in the blood. It is also characterized by invasion of the thyroid tissue by leukocytes, chiefly T-lymphocytes.

Ord's thyroiditis usually results in hypothyroidism. Transient hyperthyroid states in the acute phase, (a common observation in Hashimoto's thyroiditis), are rare in Ord's disease.

== Diagnosis ==
Ord's thyroiditis can be difficult to identify as its signs can be easy to miss or share symptoms with other diseases. One way to identify Ord's Thyroiditis is by checking for an atrophied thyroid gland as this is the main symptom of the diseases. Checking for functional hypothyroidism can help identify if atrophic thyroiditis is present as functional hypothyroidism is associated with and can be caused by Ord's Thyroiditis.

== Treatment ==
Treatment is as with hypothyroidism, daily thyroxine(T4).

== Epidemiology ==
Outside Europe a goitrous form of autoimmune thyroiditis (Hashimoto's Thyroiditis) is more common than Ord's disease.

== See also ==
- Thyroiditis
- Hypothyroidism
- Hashimoto's thyroiditis
- Thyroxine
