= Isaac Basire =

English Anglican divine and traveller (1607-1676)

Isaac Basire (1607 – 12 October 1676) was an English Anglican divine and traveller. A chaplain to Charles I, he left Britain during the Civil War, and travelled to Greece and Asia Minor, with the ambition of converting the Eastern Orthodox churches to Anglicanism. He returned to England in 1661, following the restoration of the monarchy under Charles II.

== Early life ==
Basire was born, probably at Rouen in Normandy, or, according to Anthony à Wood, in Jersey. His full name was Isaac Basire de Preaumont, but he dropped the latter part of the name when he settled in England. His father was a Protestant, and belonged to the lowest order of French nobility. Little is known of his early years, but at sixteen he was sent to school in Rotterdam, and two years later (1625) he removed to Leyden University. At Leyden he published (1627) a disputation which he had held there, De Purgatorio et Indulgentiis.

In about 1628 Basire settled in England, and in 1629 he received holy orders from Thomas Morton, then Bishop of Lichfield and Coventry, who soon afterwards made him his chaplain. In 1632, Morton was translated to Durham, and Basire accompanied him there. In 1635 he married Frances Corbett, a member of an old Shropshire family. In 1636 the University of Cambridge conferred upon him the degree of B.D., in compliance with the royal mandate, and appointed him one of the university preachers through England and Ireland. In the same year Bishop Morton bestowed upon him the rectory of Egglescliffe, near Yarm.

In 1640 he was made D.D., and in 1641 chaplain extraordinary to King Charles I. In 1643 he was collated by Bishop Morton to the seventh stall in Durham Cathedral, and in 1644 to the Archdeaconry of Northumberland with the rectory of Howick annexed. These were, for the present, merely nominal appointments, for in consequence of the civil war both the duties and emoluments were in abeyance. In 1645 the rich living of Stanhope became vacant; it was in the gift of the Bishop of Durham, but Morton, "oppressed and overawed by the terrors of the rebels, durst not dispose of it". It therefore lapsed to the crown, and the king gave it to Basire, who was then in attendance upon him as chaplain at Oxford; this also, of course, was only a nominal preferment.

In 1646 Basire, who as royal chaplain had markedly identified himself with the king's cause, was seized at Egglescliffe and taken to Stockton Castle and his livings were sequestered. On his release he was "forced by want of subsistence for himself and his family" to go abroad, leaving his wife and children to live upon the so-called "fifths", which "were paid by sixes and sevens, or rather by tenths and twelfths", and upon the small sums which Basire conscientiously remitted to them whenever he possibly could. Mrs Basire, however, found a kind friend in Richard Busby, who had been most intimate with her husband, and who frequently expressed himself under great obligations to him for spiritual counsel. When Basire went to London he always stayed with Busby at Westminster School, and he placed his eldest son under the doctor's charge at an unusually early age.

== Travels ==
Basire commenced his travels by visiting Rouen, where he had a small patrimony of about £8 per annum. Here he was joined by three pupils, two of whom bore the aristocratic names of Lambton and Ashburnham, while the third was a Mr Andrews. With these three he began his travels in the summer of 1647, going first to Paris, where he had an interview with the unfortunate Queen of England, Henrietta Maria, who gave him a recommendation to Sir Kenelm Digby, the English legate at Rome. Thence he travelled to Naples and Sicily, and reached Rome in 1649.

One by one his pupils left him, and he does not seem to have sought any others. It appears from his letters to his wife that he had considerable difficulty in getting paid for his pupils, and he had now a nobler object in view. That object was nothing less than to disseminate the Anglo-Catholic faith throughout the East. It seems at first sight a wild and quixotic enterprise for a man who had no knowledge of any eastern language to attempt to impress his religious opinions upon the unchanging East; but he had a thorough conviction that the true position of Anglicanism only required to be known to secure its acceptance among earnest and intelligent Christians, and the result proved that his design was more than a day-dream. Basire visited Messina, Zante, the Morea, Smyrna, Aleppo, Antioch, Jerusalem, Transylvania, Constantinople, Mesopotamia, and many other places, ever keeping his one object before him. In a letter written in 1653 from Pera to Sir Richard Browne, the father-in-law of John Evelyn, and the mainstay of the English church in Paris, he describes what he had effected. At Zante he met with great success "in spreading among the Greeks the catholic doctrine of our church", mainly through a Greek translation of the church catechism. He made such way that he incurred the enmity of the "Latins", that is, those members of the Roman church in the East who perform their services in Latin. He was therefore obliged to go on to the Morea, where the Metropolitan of Achaea allowed him to preach twice in Greek at a meeting of bishops and clergy. At Aleppo he held frequent conversations with the patriarch of Antioch, then resident there, and left copies of the church catechism translated into Arabic. From Aleppo he went to Jerusalem, where he was honoured both by the Greek and the Latin Christians. The Greek patriarch "expressed his desire of communion with our old church of England", and gave him his bull or patriarchal seal; while the Latins received him into their convent, a rare honour then to be paid to someone they considered a heretic. "Then", he says, "I passed over the Euphrates and went into Mesopotamia, Abraham's country, whither I am intending to send our catechism in Turkish to some of their bishops". This was in 1652; he spent the winter of 1652–3 at Aleppo.

In the spring of 1653 he went from Aleppo to Constantinople by land, a distance of about 600 miles, unaccompanied by any one who could speak any European language. He had picked up a little Arabic at Aleppo, and he joined a company of twenty Turks, an apparently dangerous escort; but they treated him well, because he acted as physician to them. He now enjoyed a little comparative rest. At Pera, near Constantinople, he undertook to officiate to the French Protestants, on the express condition that he might use the English liturgy in French. They consented to this, and promised "to settle on him a competent stipend". Here he became known to Achatius Barcsay, envoy to the Porte from Prince George II Rákóczi. Barcsay introduced him to the prince. "In 1661", he wrote:

"I was honourably engaged, and that still with the royal leave, in the service of that valiant Achilles of Christendom, George Ragoczi II, Prince of Transylvania, my late gracious master, who for the space of seven years had honoured me with the divinity chair in his university of Alba Iulia, the metropolis of that noble country, and endowed me (a meer stranger to him) with a very ample honorary, till in that very year, that prince dying of his wounds received in his last memorable battel with the Turks at Gyalu, the care of his solemn obsequies was committed to me by his relict, the Princess Sophia, whereby I was kept a year longer out of England."

Basire still kept his one object in view at Alba Iulia, for we find him writing to Sir Edward Hyde (afterwards Lord Clarendon) in 1658: "As for maintenance here 'tis competent; but my especial loadstone hath been the opportunity in the chair to propagate the right christian religion as well for discipline as doctrine". He had great influence with Prince Rákóczi, and was not afraid of boldly telling him his mind. When a Turkish invasion was imminent, he wrote to the prince, urging him either to exert himself to save his country or to abdicate his throne. The appeal was not in vain. Rákóczi made an heroic but unsuccessful struggle against the invaders at the Battle of Gyalu, but was mortally wounded and died soon after (June 1660). All this time Basire had not severed his connection with his other royal master, Charles II. In 1655 he wrote a long letter in Latin to the king, exhorting him to be true to his religion; and in the same year Charles wrote to Prince Rákóczi thanking him for his kindness to Basire, and another letter a little before the prince's death begging him to send Basire back to England. Rákóczi, "loath to lose him", concealed this letter from Basire for a while, and after his death his widow begged him still to stay in Transylvania and educate her son. This, however, he refused to do. The Church of England was now restored, and his wife and his five children were still in England.

== Return to England ==
Basire returned to England towards the end of 1661 by way of Hamburg and Hull. In the archives of the chapter of Alba Iulia is a list of his goods and manuscripts (including lectures, disputations, and itineraria), which were to be sent after him. A similar list, in Basire's handwriting, endorsed "Bona relicta in Transylvania anno 1660", is among the Hunter MSS. in the Durham Dean and Chapter Library. The result of his varied experiences, so far as religion was concerned, is thus stated by himself:

"The church of England is the most apostolical and purest of all christian churches. Expertus loquor, for in fifteen years' ecclesiastical pilgrimage (during my voluntary banishment for my religion and loyalty) I have surveyed most christian churches, both eastern and western; and I dare pronounce the church of England what David said of Goliath's sword, 'There is none like it', both for primitive doctrine, worship, discipline, and government".

Though Basire speaks of both eastern and western churches, it was with the eastern that he had most to do. "It hath been my constant design", he wrote in his letter to Sir Richard Browne, "to dispose and incline the Greek church to a communion with the church of England, together with a canonical reformation of some grosser errors". Those who are acquainted with the church history of the eighteenth century will observe that Basire was in advance of his age; for what he attempted was, half a century later, the subject of many negotiations in which the nonjurors took a leading part.

Basire, on his return to England, was restored to his stall in Durham Cathedral, the rectory of Egglescliffe, and the Archdeaconry of Northumberland. Bishop Cosin also persuaded the intruding minister of Stanhope, Andrew Lamant, to take Long Newton instead of Stanhope, in order that Basire might be reinstated in the latter. Basire was now, therefore, a wealthy man, but he still had his troubles, one of the chief of them being his son Peter, who became a Catholic. His hands moreover were more than full of work. "The archdeaconry of Northumberland", he writes, "will take up a whole man, (1) to reform the persons, (2) to repair the churches".

He diligently visited the churches in his archdeaconry, and found "many of them scandalously ruinous"; but he met with a liberal and vigorous supporter in his attempts to reform in Bishop Cosin, with whom he appears to have been as closely connected as with his predecessor, Bishop Morton. The last fifteen years of Basire's life were comparatively uneventful. Evelyn mentions in his Diary (10 November 1661) that there "preached in the abbey (Westminster) Dr. Basire, that great traveller, or rather French apostle, who had been planting the church of England in divers parts of the Levant and Asia"; but we do not hear much of him from other sources.

Basire died on 12 October 1676, and "was buried in the cemetery belonging to the cathedral of Durham, near to the body of an ancient servant that had lived many years with him, and not by that of his wife in the cathedral"' (Wood, Fasti Oxon.) It was his own "desire" that his body should find "burial in the churchyard, not out of any singularity . . . but out of veneration of the house of God".

== Works ==
- In 1646 Basire published a work entitled Deo et Ecclesiæ Sacrum. Sacriledge arraigned and condemned by St. Paul, Rom. ii. 22. There was not much demand for this kind of work during the rebellion, but in 1668 Basire republished and enlarged "a piece", he says, "which had been rough cast inter tubam et tympanum " (that is, during the Siege of Oxford).
- In 1648 he wrote a short treatise in Latin entitled Diatriba de Antiqua Ecclesiarum Britannicarum Antiquitate, which was published in 1656 at Bruges by Richard Watson, chaplain to Sir R. Browne, and also translated and published by him in English in 1661.
- In 1659 appeared a History of the English and Scotch Presbytery, written in French by an eminent divine [Isaac Basire] of the Reformed Church, and now Englished, which reached a second edition in 1660.
- In 1670 Basire published a short Oratio Privata.
- The most interesting of his works is his Brief of the Life, Dignities, Benefactions, Principal Actions and Sufferings of the Bishop of Durham, which is appended to the sermon (The Dead Man's real Speech) preached by Basire at the funeral of Bishop Cosin, 29 April 1672. The Brief is a very racily written little biography, giving in the space of 100 pages all that is necessary to be known about Cosin.

Many of Basire's manuscripts are extant in the Hunter collection of manuscripts in Durham Chapter Library. A complete list is printed in Thomas Rud's Catalogue of Durham Chapter MSS. They include an itinerary of tours in France and Italy for 1647–8, and notes of journeys made in 1667–8. The manuscripts left by Basire in Transylvania do not appear to be among them.
