= Peter Elliott (English priest) =

Anglican priest (born 1941)

Peter Elliott (born 14 June 1941) is a retired English Anglican priest who was the Archdeacon of Northumberland from 1993 to 2005.

Elliott was educated at the Queen Elizabeth Grammar School in Horncastle and Hertford College, Oxford. He was ordained in 1965. Following curacies at All Saints' Church, Gosforth, and St Peter's, Balkwell, he held incumbencies in Elswick, North Gosforth and Embleton before his appointment as an archdeacon.

Church of England titles
| Preceded by William Thomas | Archdeacon of Northumberland; 1993–2005 | Succeeded by Geoff Miller |
