= John Taylor (bishop of Sheffield) =

Francis John Taylor (13 November 1912 – 4 July 1971) was the third Bishop of Sheffield from 1962.

Born on 13 November 1912 and educated at Hymers College and The Queen's College, Oxford, he was ordained in 1937 and began his career with a curacy at Walcot, Bath. He was then a Tutor, Lecturer and Chaplain at Wycliffe Hall, Oxford after which he was Vicar of Christ Church, Claughton, Merseyside. From 1954, he was Principal of Wycliffe, a post he held until his elevation to the Episcopate. He was ordained into bishop's orders on St James's Day 1962 (25 July), by Donald Coggan, Archbishop of York, at York Minster. He died in post on 4 July 1971 aged 58.

== Notes ==
Church of England titles
Preceded by Leslie Hunter	Bishop of Sheffield; 1962 – 1971	Succeeded by Gordon Fallows
