= Edward Wortley Montagu (traveller) =

English writer and traveller (1713-1776)

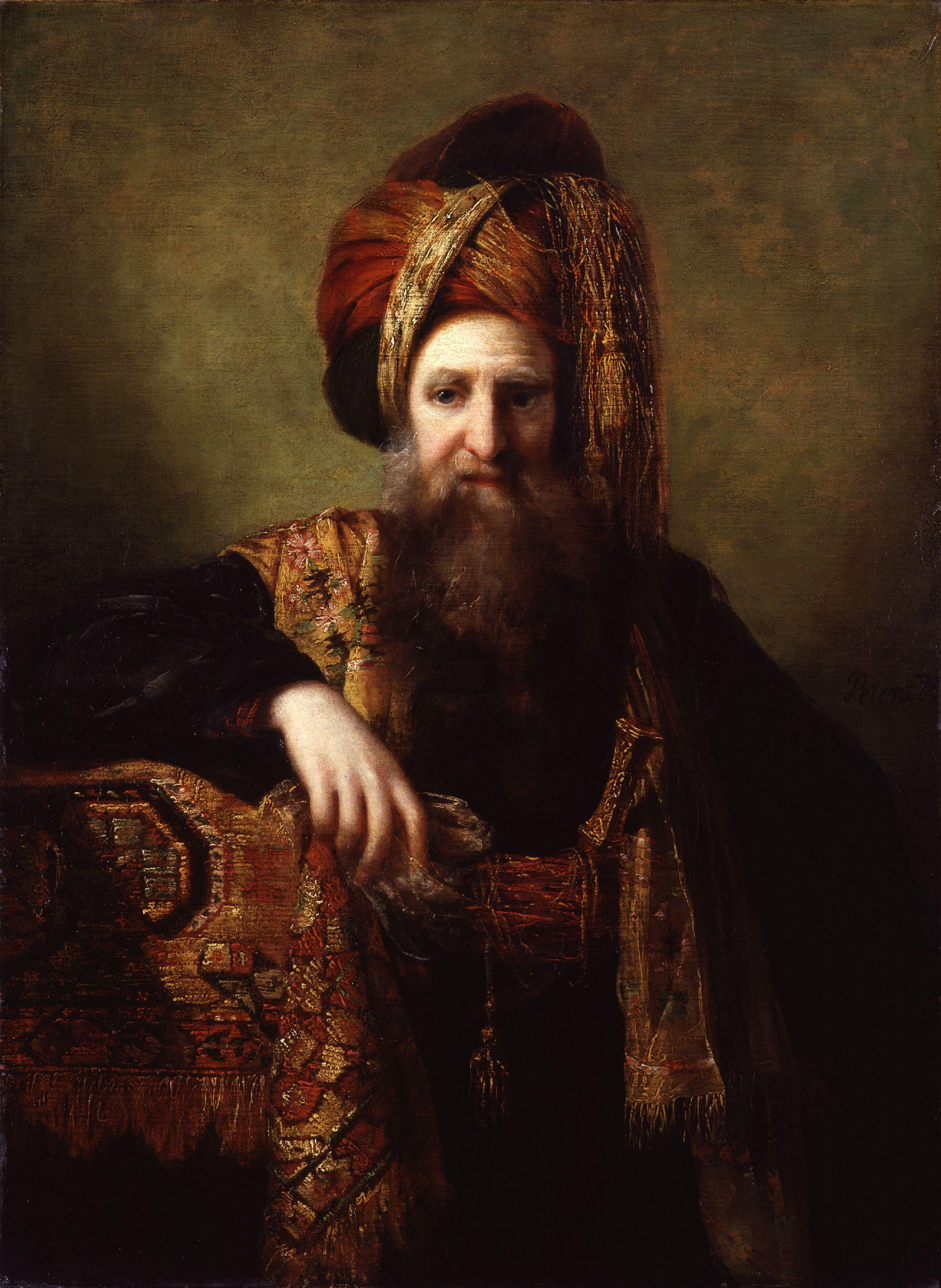
A 1775 portrait of Edward Wortley Montagu by Matthew William Peters

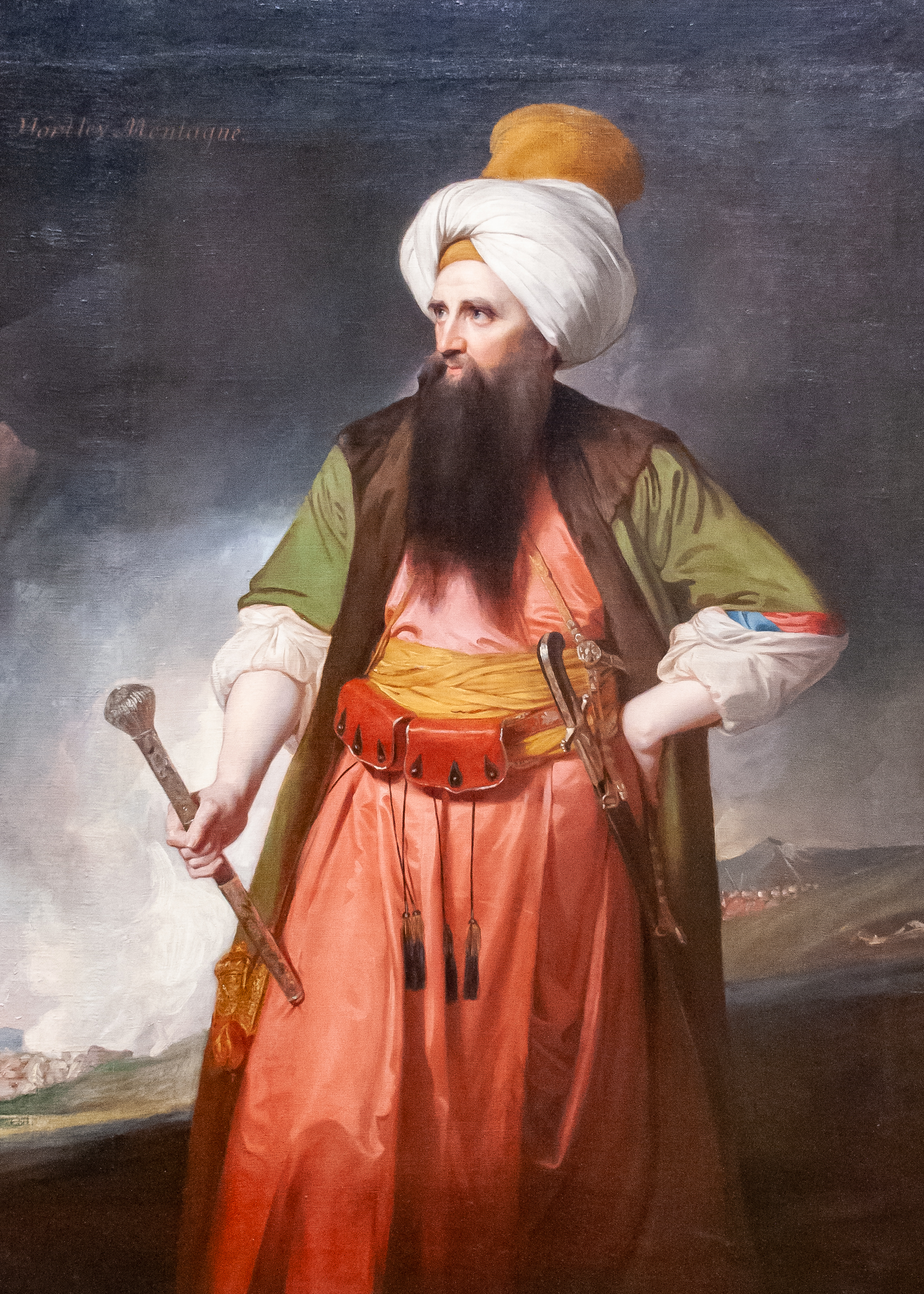
Montagu in Turkish dress, portrait by George Romney

Edward Wortley Montagu (15 May 1713 – 29 April 1776) was an English writer and traveller.

== Biography ==
He was the son of the diplomat and member of parliament Edward Wortley Montagu and the writer and traveller Lady Mary Wortley Montagu, whose talent and eccentricity he seems to have inherited. In 1716, he was taken by his parents to Constantinople in the Ottoman Empire, and at Pera in March 1716-17 was inoculated for smallpox, the first native of the United Kingdom to undergo this medical procedure.

On the return of his parents to England in 1718, he was placed at Westminster School, from which he ran away more than once. On the first occasion, in July 1726, he was traced to Oxford, and was with difficulty 'reduced to the humble condition of a school-boy.' He decamped again in August 1727 and was not recovered for some months. Two similar escapades are mentioned by his tutor, Forster, chaplain to the Duchess of Kingston, but without dates. The first ended in his discovery, after a year's absence, selling fish in Blackwall. The second time, he worked his passage out to Porto, deserted, went up country, and found employment in the vineyards, but returning to Porto in charge of some asses, he was arrested at the instance of the British consul, brought back to his ship, identified and restored to his parents by the master.

He was then sent to travel with a tutor in the West Indies, and afterwards with a keeper to the Netherlands. He made a serious study of Arabic at Leiden in 1741 and returned many years later to prosecute his studies. His father made him a meagre allowance, and he was heavily encumbered with debt.

He served in the British army from 1743 to 1748, first as a cornet in the 7th Dragoon Guards and later as a captain-lieutenant in the 1st Regiment of Foot. He fought at the Battle of Fontenoy. He left the army in 1748. He thereafter traveled in various parts for many years, writing brief diary notes of his travels along with occasional sketches; and finally returned to his studies in 1769.

Rare map of the Gulf of Ambracia, Preveza, and Lefkas, drawn and published by Edward Wortley Montagu, in c. 1760

He was Member of Parliament (MP) for Huntingdonshire in 1747 and was one of the secretaries at the conference of Aix-la-Chapelle that closed the War of the Austrian Succession in 1748. In 1751, he was involved in a disreputable gaming quarrel in Paris; arrested for cheating a Jew at cards and then robbing him when he refused to pay; and was imprisoned for eleven days in the Châtelet. He was cleared after the first court hearing before the decision was overturned by the Parlement of Paris, and he was ordered to pay a fine of 300 livres. He continued to sit in parliament, and wrote Reflections on the Rise and Fall of the Antient Republics ... (1759). Whilst in Italy, he designed and published a detailed map of the Ambracian Gulf and the island of Lefkas in northwestern Greece. His father left him an annuity of £1000, the bulk of the property going to his sister Lady Bute.

He set out for extended travel in the East, and George Romney described him as living in the Turkish manner at Venice. Fluent in Hebrew, Arabic, Chaldaic, and Persian, he was also an excellent orator. His family thought him mad, and his mother left him a single guinea in her will, but her annuity devolved on him at her death. He died at Padua in Italy.

== Further references ==
- Curling, Jonathan (1954). Edward Wortley Montagu 1713–1776: The Man in the Iron Wig. The Rogues Gallery Number One (Illustrated ed.). London: Andrew Melrose.
- Gruber, Ira (2010). Books and the British Army in the Age of the American Revolution. Chapel Hill: University of North Carolina Press.
- Sykes, Christopher Simon (1982). Black Sheep. London: Chatto & Windus. ISBN 0-7011-2548-9.
- Isobel Grundy, "Edward Wortley Montagu", Oxford Dictionary of National Biography (subscription)
- Finding aid to Edward Wortley Montagu papers at Columbia University. Rare Book & Manuscript Library.

Parliament of Great Britain
Preceded by Thomas Foster; William Breton	Member of Parliament for Bossiney; 1747; With: Richard Heath	Succeeded by Richard Heath; William Ord
Preceded by Coulson Fellowes; William Montagu	Member of Parliament for Huntingdonshire; 1747–1754; With: Coulson Fellowes	Succeeded by Coulson Fellowes; The Lord Carysfort
Preceded by William Ord; William Montagu	Member of Parliament for Bossiney; 1754–1768; With: Edwin Sandys 1754–1761; John Richmond Webb 1761–1766; Lord Mount Stuart 1766–1768	Succeeded by Lord Mount Stuart; Henry Luttrell
