= James Henderson (priest) =

James Henderson was Archdeacon of Northumberland from 1905 to 1917.

Born into a medical family in Berwick-upon-Tweed in September 1840 Henderson was educated at University College, Durham and ordained in 1863. After curacies in Newcastle and Hurworth-on-Tees he held incumbencies in Ancroft, Shadforth and Wallsend before his Archdeacon’s appointment.

Henderson died on 21 April 1935.

Church of England titles
Preceded by George Hans Hamilton	Archdeacon of Northumberland; 1905–1917	Succeeded by Charles Blackett-Ord
