= Fenham =

Coordinates: 54.9848°N 1.6553°W

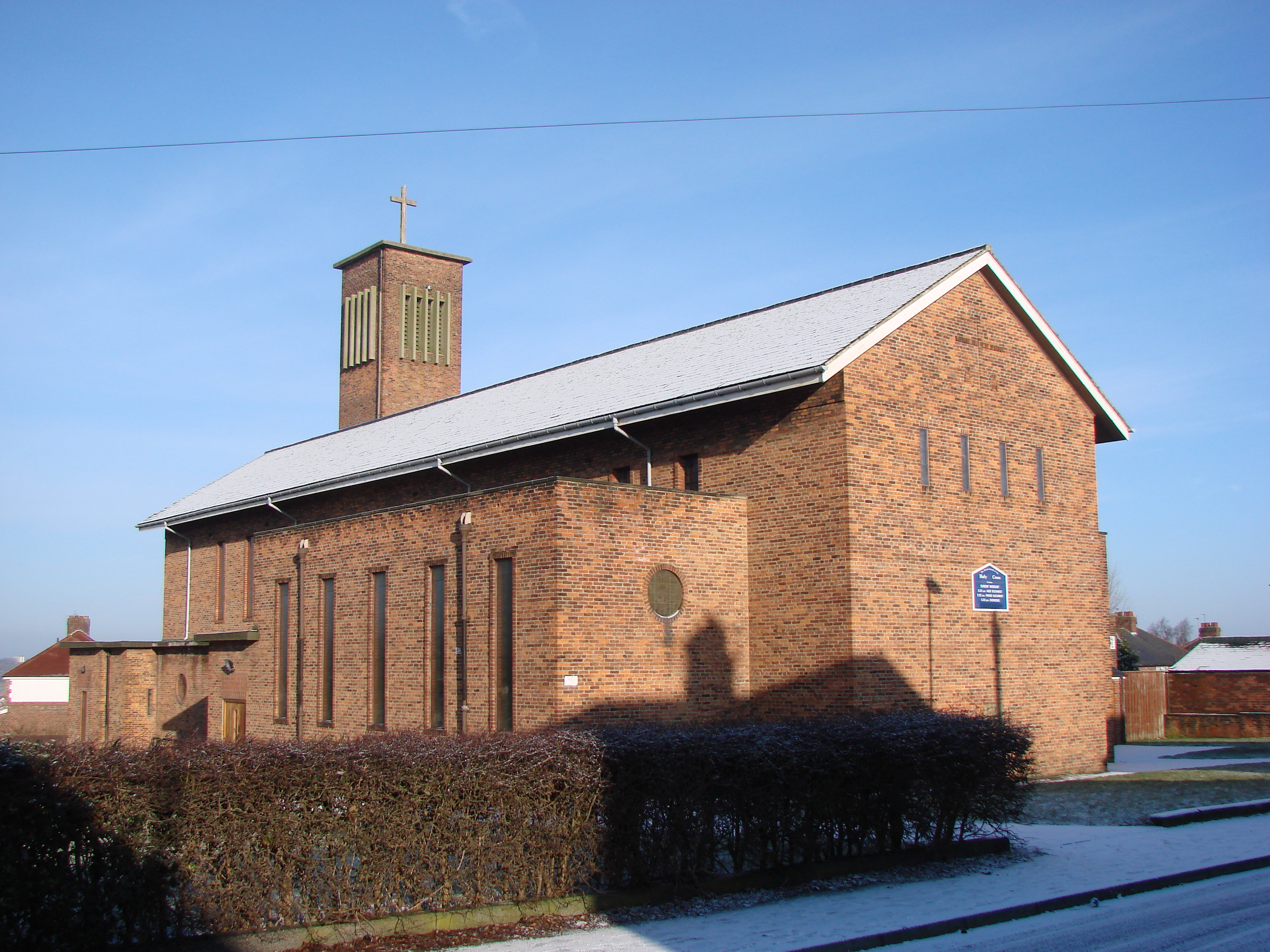
- Church of the Holy Cross, Fenham

- Location within Tyne and Wear
- Population: 10,954 (2011.ward)
- OS grid reference: NZ220656
- Metropolitan borough: Newcastle upon Tyne
- Metropolitan county: Tyne and Wear
- Region: North East
- Country: England
- Sovereign state: United Kingdom
- Post town: NEWCASTLE UPON TYNE
- Postcode district: NE4
- Dialling code: 0191
- Police: Northumbria
- Fire: Tyne and Wear
- Ambulance: North East
- UK Parliament: Newcastle upon Tyne Central

Fenham is an area of the west-end of Newcastle upon Tyne, in the county of Tyne and Wear, England. It lies to the west of the city centre, and is bounded on the north and east by a large area of open land known as the Town Moor. To the south lies Benwell, West Denton lies to the west, Blakelaw and Cowgate to the north, and Arthur's Hill and Spital Tongues to the east. Until 1974 it was in Northumberland.

As of 2018, the area covers two wards of Newcastle: Wingrove Ward, and West Fenham Ward.

Fenham grew up as a separate township from Newcastle, lying on the western outskirts of the city. Much of the land originally belonged to religious charitable institutions, and there are covenant restrictions on the building of any licensed premises.

== History ==
Fenham was part of the manor of Elswick in the Barony of Bolam until the lands were passed into the ownership of the Knights Templar in 1185. Following the suppression of the Templars in 1307 the manor of Fenham was transferred to the Knights Hospitaller in 1313. In the intervening years it is recorded that coal mines on the site were leased to the town's Corporation.

Fenham was formerly a township in the parish of Newcastle-St. Andrew, in 1866 Fenham became a separate civil parish, on 1 April 1914 the parish was abolished to form Newcastle upon Tyne. In 1911 the parish had a population of 1049. It is now in the unparished area of Newcastle upon Tyne.

=== Fenham Hall ===
Fenham Hall has its origins in the 14th century. Surrendered by the Hospitallers to the Crown at the Reformation, it was granted initially to the Riddell family before being acquired (along with much of the surrounding land) by the Ords in 1695. The present building was begun by John Ord in 1744; following his death the following year it was continued by his brother William. The Hall was expanded and rebuilt over subsequent decades, and now shows various stages of architectural development; the interior was gutted by fire in 1908. (Three years earlier the hall had been purchased as a school.)

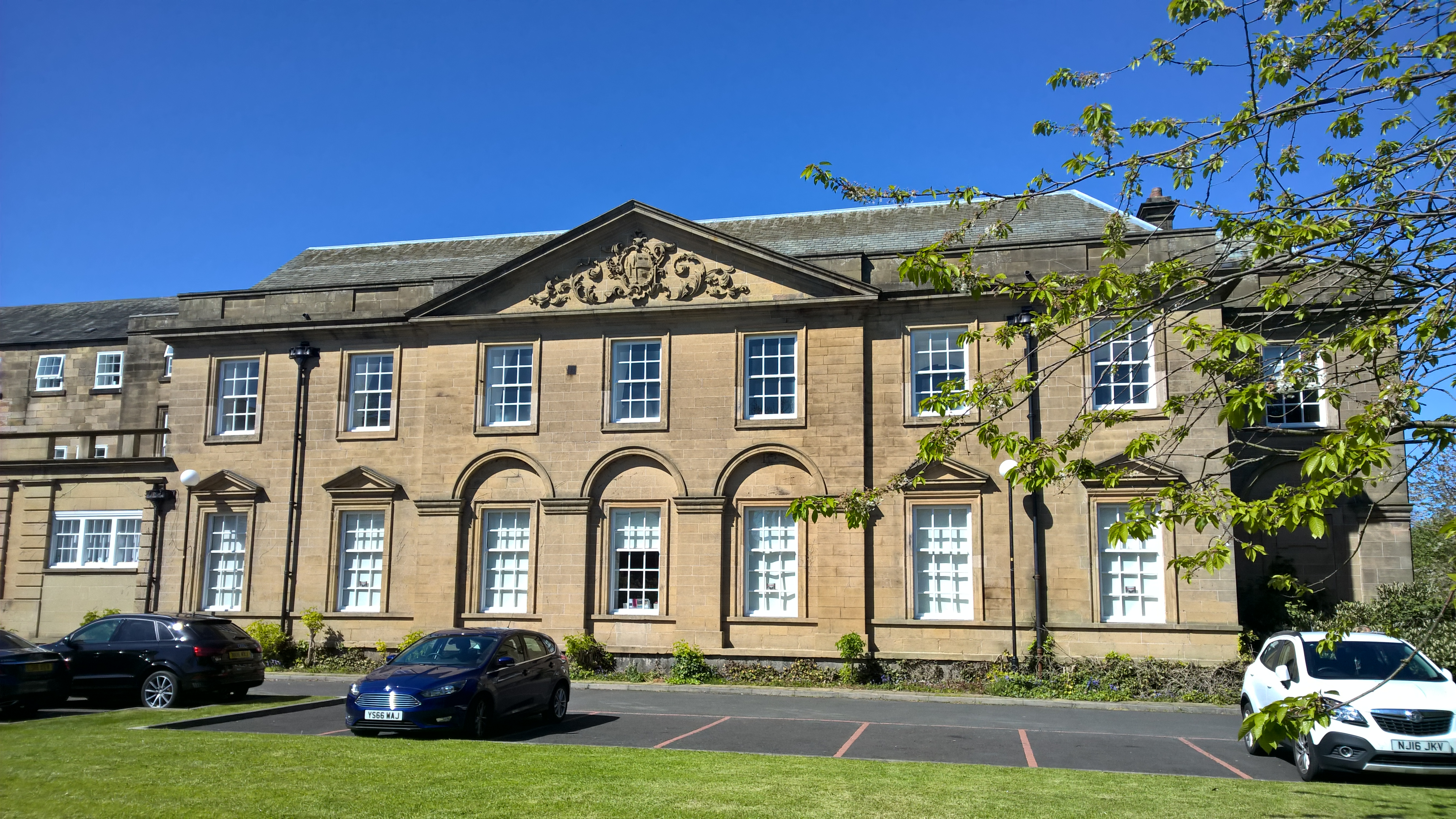
South front (1748 by Daniel Garrett). The pediment displays the Ord family coat of arms.

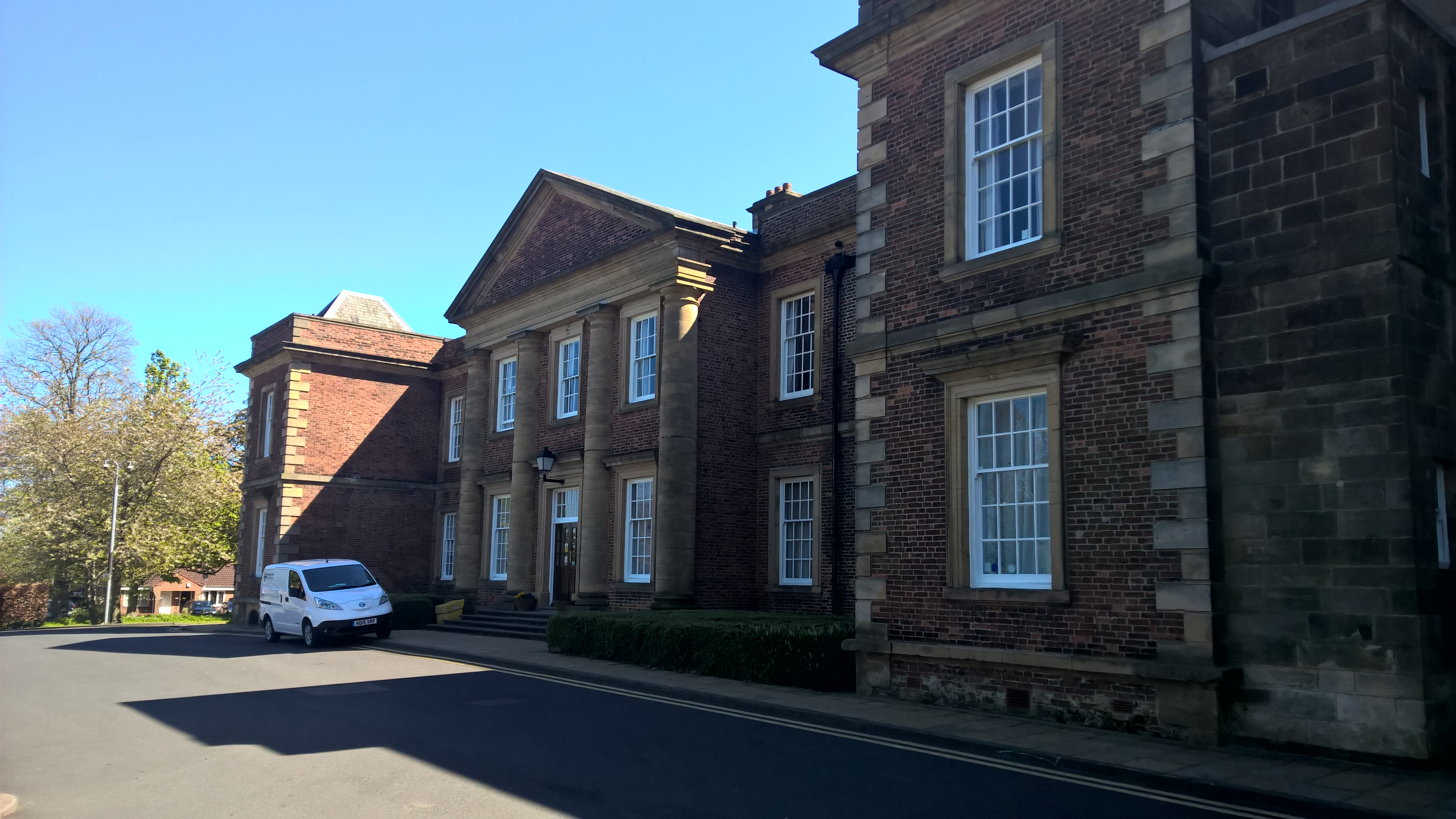
North front, attributed to William Newton (late 18th or early 19th century).

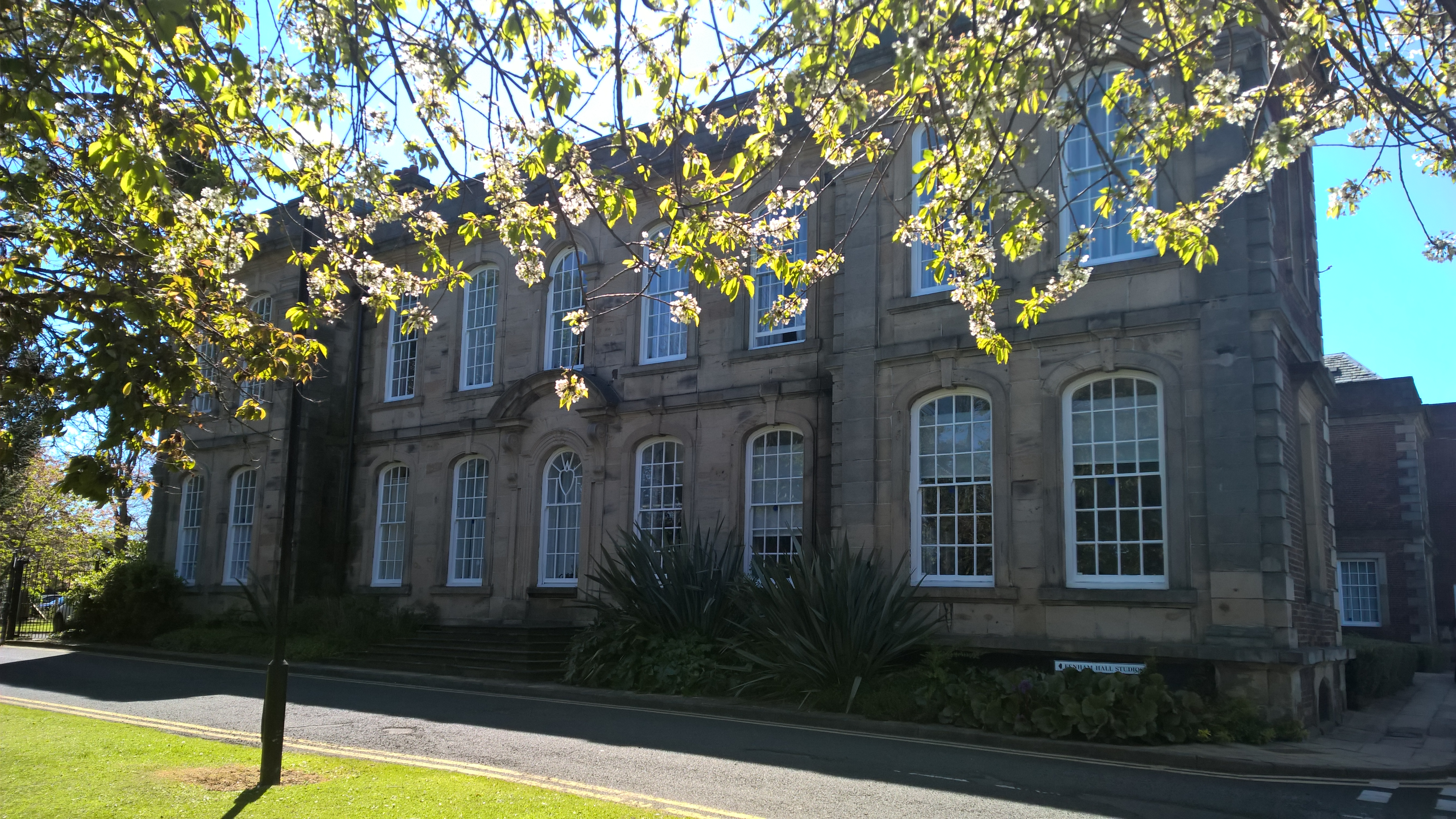
East front (c.1850, architect unknown).

==== St Mary's College ====
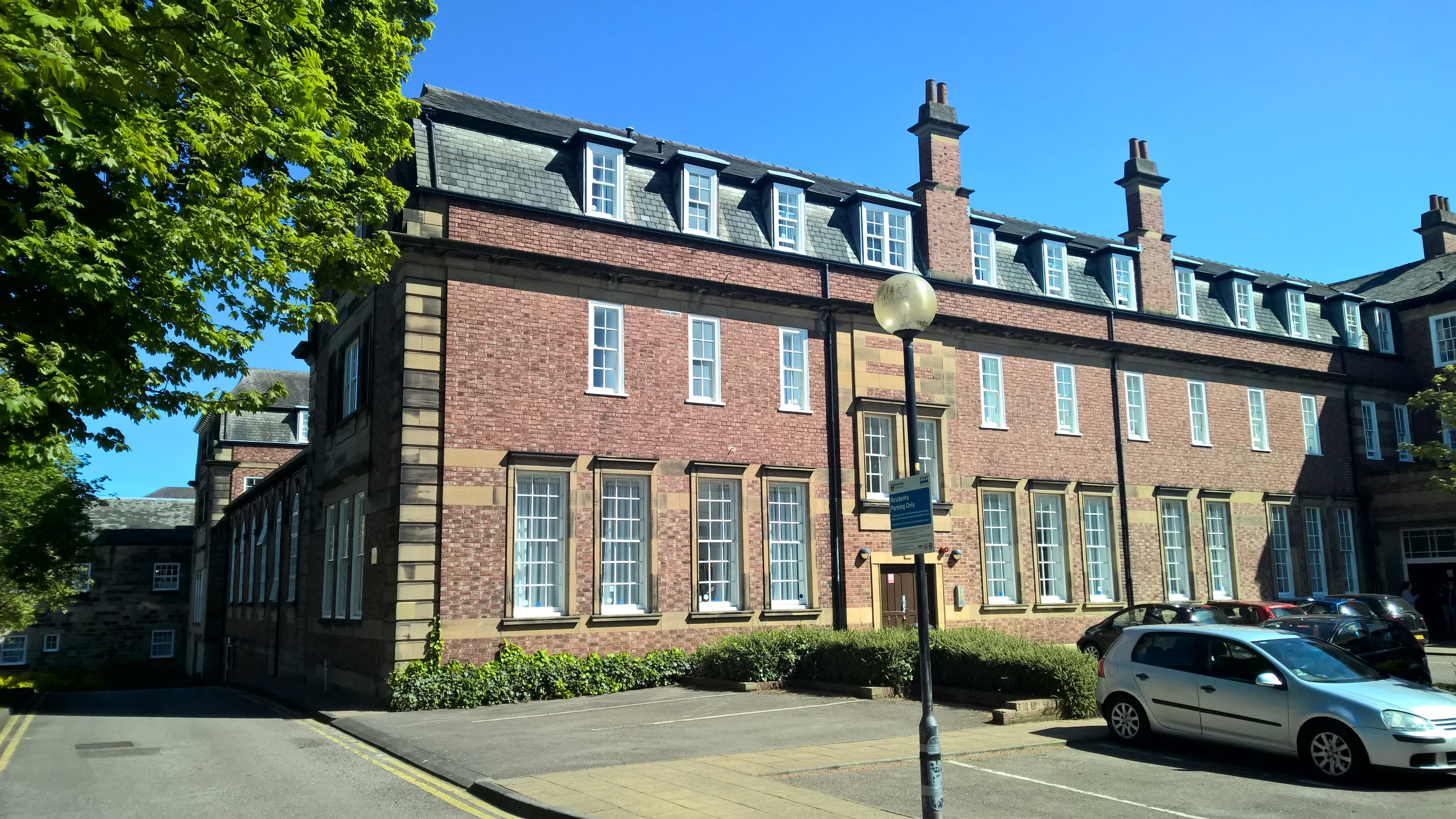
Fenham Hall: extension to the west by Leonard Stokes (1907, for St Mary's College).

In 1905 Fenham Hall was purchased by the Society of the Sacred Heart to house a secondary school and a Teacher Training College: St Mary's. The hall itself accommodated the convent and dormitories; further buildings were added for the school and lecture rooms. The Training College closed in 1984, but Sacred Heart Catholic High School remains. Since the closure of St Mary's College the Hall and associated buildings have served as student accommodation for Newcastle University.

=== Fenham Barracks ===
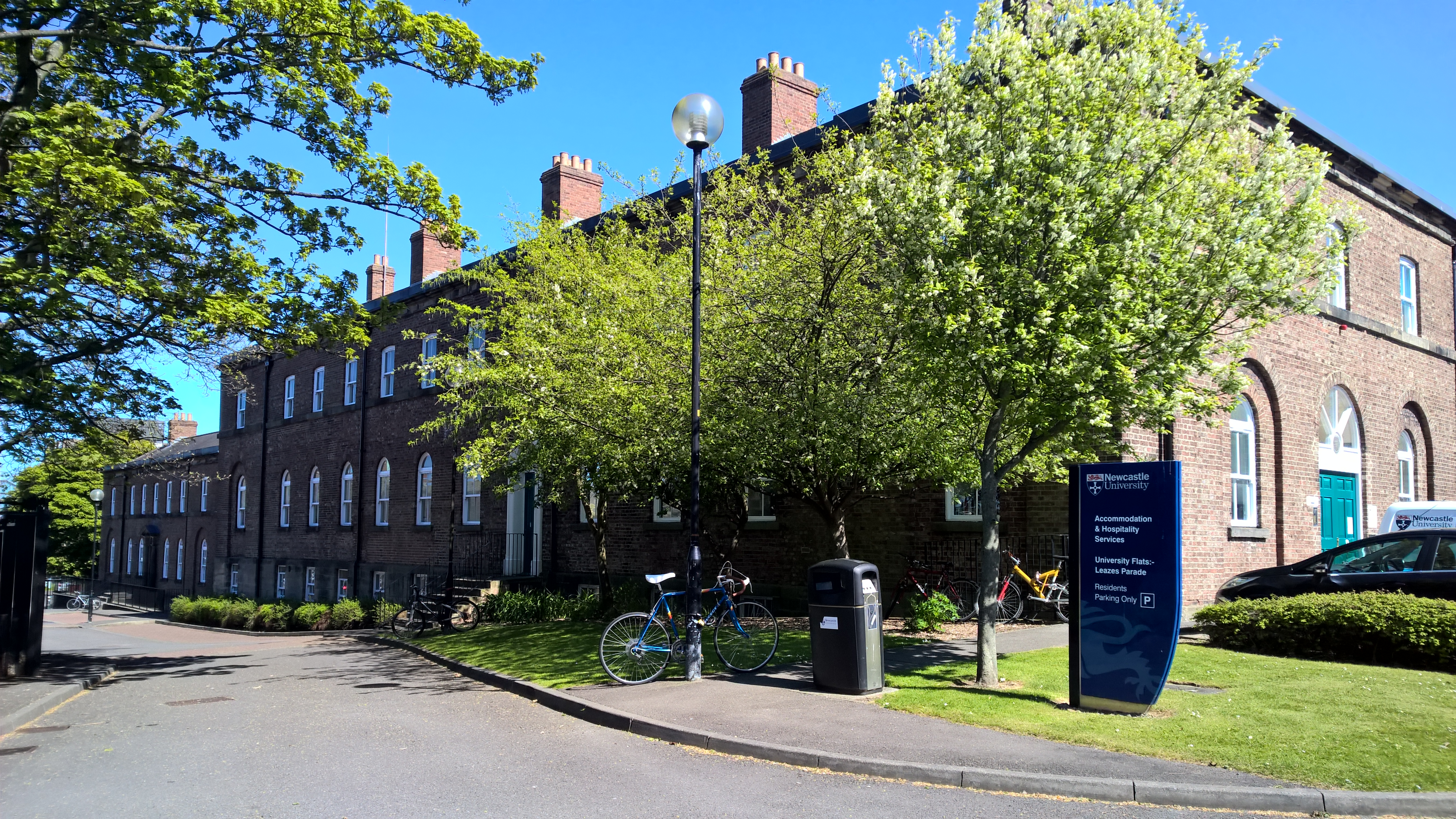
Fenham Barracks: surviving blocks of 1804 (officers' quarters and officers' mess); now student accommodation.

Fenham Barracks was built in 1804-06 by James Johnson and John Saunders (architects at the Barrack Department of the War Office) on an 11-acre portion of the Town Moor leased from the Newcastle Freemen. Some ten years earlier, the Lord Mayor of Newcastle had written to the Home Secretary expressing local fears of sedition in the wake of the French Revolution. The barracks initially housed units of cavalry and artillery (capable of being deployed locally, as well as overseas during the Napoleonic Wars). Two-storey barrack blocks accommodated the men upstairs and the horses below.

In the 1870s the site was expanded to the north, with the addition of a hospital and other amenities, in the wake of the Cardwell Reforms (which also saw Fenham designated as the regimental depot of both the Northumberland Fusiliers and the Durham Light Infantry). Several of the old barracks blocks were demolished in the 1930s. There was further (almost comprehensive) demolition in the 1970s, when the northern part of the site was redeveloped by the Freemen to provide industrial units, a headquarters for the national Blood Transfusion Service and a new BBC Broadcasting Centre (for BBC Radio Newcastle and BBC Look North); proceeds of the sale help fund the maintenance of the Town Moor. Part of the site remains in military hands and it serves as headquarters for local Army Reserve units.

=== Modern developments ===
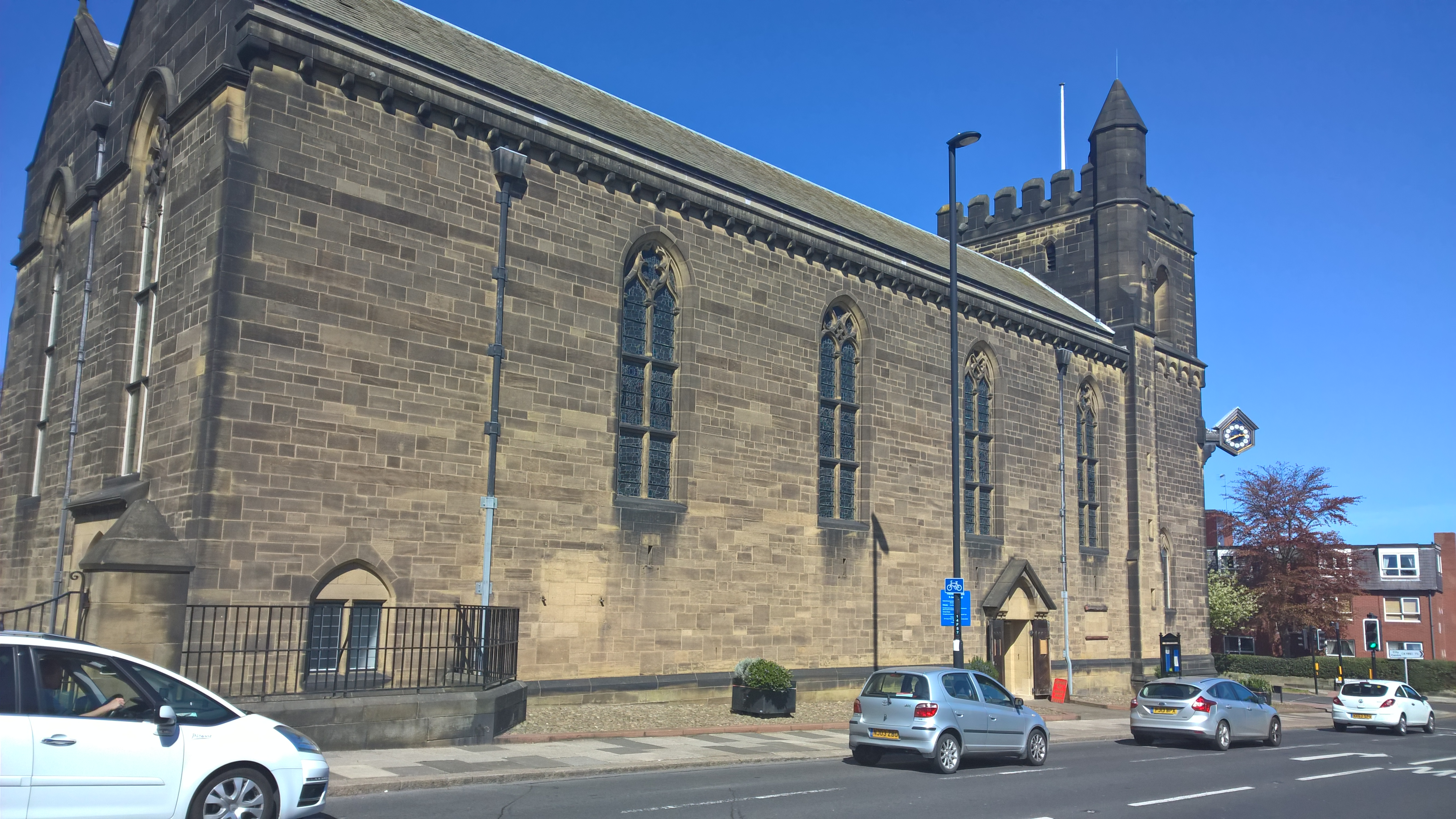
The Church of St James and St Basil on Fenham Hall Drive

In 1895 Benwell and Fenham Urban District was created; in 1904 the area was incorporated into Newcastle upon Tyne.

Fenham did not become a residential area until the 20th century. Housing was built on a large scale when tram lines were extended from Central Station via Barrack Road. Further expansion was facilitated by the development of trolley buses and bus links to Westerhope. The Fenham Estates Company undertook residential development and by 1914 both sides Of Fenham Hall Drive had been built up; building continued in Wingrove Avenue, Wingrove Road and Wingrove Gardens up to 1920. The majority of house building up to 1940 was by private builders. City corporation building occurred after 1920 when there was a sale of Blackett-Ord lands and funding became available to purchase and develop areas around Silver Lonnen.

During the 1930s, a period of significant residential development and expansion, two churches opened in Fenham: the Arts & Crafts Church of St James and St Basil (architect: E. E. Lofting) was consecrated on 6 June 1931, having been funded by Sir James Knott in memory of his sons, James and Basil, killed in the First World War; the modernist Holy Cross Church (architect: Henry Hicks) was consecrated on Holy Cross Day 1936, having been funded by local landowner John Reginald Blackett-Ord.

== Local amenities ==
Fenham possesses a public library on Fenham Hall Drive. It is a Grade II listed building. In December 2018 a drug and alcohol rehabilitation centre was opened in the library building. This has faced opposition from the Fenham Library Action Group (FLAG) and local residents; a petition against the development attracted 3,000 signatures. Fenham has an active residents group called Fenham Association of Residents that launched the FAR Community Centre in 2001. The FAR Community Centre offers activities for all age groups offering activities aimed at helping residents improve their self-esteem and skills. There was also a public swimming pool, since August 2005 run as a community organisation. The pool was shut in 2003, but in 2004 the Liberal Democrats took control of Newcastle City Council from Labour; one of their pledges was to re-open Fenham pool, which was achieved with substantial financial backing from residents of the local community. The pool was closed in July 2019.

The main local schools include Westgate Community College on West Road, Saint Cuthberts RC High School on Gretna Road and Sacred Heart RC High School. There are also some private schools situated in Fenham, one is Dame Allan's on Fowberry Crescent.

== Ethnic minority ==
Today Fenham is best known in the local area for its large Asian community, with many of the businesses in the area being Asian-owned and including many specialty stores such as a halal butchers and Asian jewellery and clothing stores. There are many ethnic minority groups living side by side in Fenham, with a significant number of people being of either Pakistani or Bangladeshi origin.

== Councillors ==
There are three councillors for the Fenham electoral ward: Helen McStravick, Matthew Myers and Marion Talbot, who all represent the Labour Party. Marion Talbot won election in May 2012, securing 1735 votes and beating her nearest rival, PJ Morrissey, on 643 votes. Talbot has since been elected to an Executive post of Performance and Resources Portfolio.
