= Robert Davell =

16th Century English Priest

Robert Davell, DCL was an English priest in the 16th century.

Davell was educated at the University of Oxford. He was Archdeacon of Northumberland from 1518 until his death in 1557.
