= John Bolde =

English Anglican priest

John Bolde, D.D. was an English Anglican priest in the 16th century.

Bolde was educated at Corpus Christi College, Oxford. Bolde was Archdeacon of Northumberland from 1578 until his resignation in 1581.
