= Thomas Singleton (priest) =

Archdeacon of Northumberland

Thomas Singleton, DD (25 July 1783 – 13 March 1842) was Archdeacon of Northumberland from 1826 until his death.

The grandson of Francis Grose and son of Anketell Singleton (Governor of Landguard Fort from 1766 to 1804) he was educated at Eton College and Corpus Christi College, Cambridge and ordained in 1807. He was Chaplain to the Duke of Northumberland and Rector of Elsdon, Northumberland before his Archdeacon's appointment.

== Notes ==
Church of England titles
Preceded by Reynold Gideon Bouyer	Archdeacon of Northumberland; 1826 - 1842	Succeeded by William Forbes Raymond
