= Gabriel Clark =

17th century English Anglican priest

Gabriel Clark D.D., was an English Anglican priest in the 17th century.

Clark was born in Hertfordshire and educated at Christ Church, Oxford. He held livings at Middleton Stoney and Elwick, County Durham. Clark was Archdeacon of Northumberland from 1619 to 1620 and Archdeacon of Durham until 1620 until his death on 10 May 1662.
