= John Morton (Anglican priest) =

English Anglican priest

John Morton, D.D. was an English Anglican priest in the 18th century.

Morton was educated at Lincoln College, Oxford. He held livings at Washington and Stanhope. Lever was Archdeacon of Northumberland from 5 October 1685 until his death on 10 November 1722.
