= Isaac Crewdson =

English Quaker writer and minister (1780–1844)

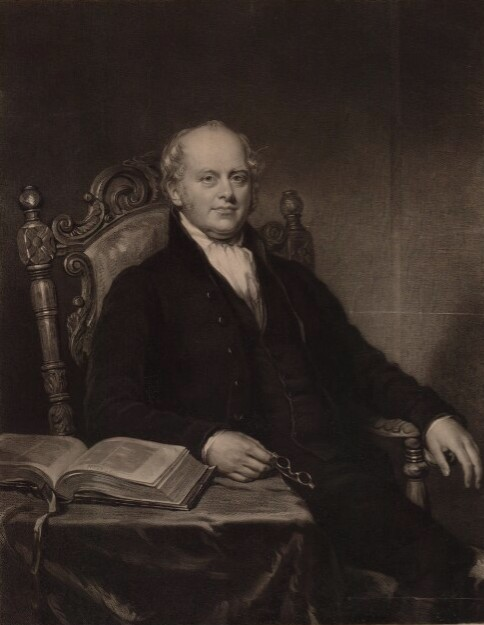
- Born: 6 June 1780; Kendal, Westmorland
- Died: 8 May 1844 (aged 63); Bowness-on-Windermere, Westmorland, UK
- Resting place: Rusholme Road Cemetery, Manchester, UK
- Occupations: Mill Owner, Minister of the Religious Society of Friends
- Known for: Founder of the Beaconites
- Spouse: Elizabeth Jowitt (married 27 July 1803)

Isaac Crewdson (6 June 1780 – 8 May 1844) was a minister of the Quaker meeting at Hardshaw East, Manchester. He wrote A Beacon to the Society of Friends, a work published in 1835 which had a schismatic effect on English Quakerism.

== Early life ==
Isaac Crewdson was born into a Quaker family in Kendal in the English Lake District. He entered the cotton trade and became a successful mill owner in Manchester. He was appointed as a Quaker minister in 1816.

== The Beaconite Controversy ==
In 1831, controversy arose amongst Manchester Quakers over the spiritual emphasis of Quakerism, and these differences culminated in 1835 when Crewdson's A Beacon to the Society of Friends was published. His book highlighted the distinction many Manchester Quakers drew between the guidance of Scripture and the central feature of Quakerism, the Inner Light, the direct and personal experience of God. Crewdson and his followers believed that too much emphasis was placed by Quakers on the Inner Light, at the expense of Biblical authority.

In his book Crewdson criticized the American Quaker, Elias Hicks (1748–1830), who considered "obedience to the light within" to be the most important principle of worship and who regarded the Bible as a "dead letter" unless read "under the regulating influence of the spirit of God". Hicks had been responsible for an earlier schism in Quakerism in 1827.

Initially, Hardshaw East Monthly Meeting was thrown into disorder by the controversy. The matter was discussed at the 1835 London Yearly Meeting and a Visiting Committee was appointed to investigate and seek the reconciliation of members there. The committee, which included Crewdson's close friend, Joseph John Gurney, the leading English Quaker evangelical of his time, was inclined to be sympathetic to Crewdson. Even so, the correspondence that took place between Crewdson and the Committee in 1835 was published by them without his knowledge and consent in A Few Particulars of the Correspondence Between the Committee Appointed by the Friends' Yearly Meeting, and Isaac Crewdson. Eventually, the Committee brought matters to a head by asking Crewdson to withdraw his book from circulation, but he refused to do so. He was then suspended from his ministry to prevent further internal strife.

In 1836 the situation was again discussed at the London Yearly Meeting. There Gurney spoke, upholding the supremacy of Scripture, but he also stressed the "true soundness of Friends' views in regard to silent meetings". He also declared that if Friends were to "give way in our meetings for worship to any ministry except that which flows immediately from the Lord's anointing we should suffer loss." Gurney also indicated that "to place the impressions received from our own minds" was a prelude to a Quaker form of Deism. Gurney declared himself to be a "middle man" between the two opposing views and the London Yearly Meeting did not resolve the issue.

The discord was effectively determined when Crewdson tendered his resignation from the Hardshaw East Monthly Meeting, this being accepted on 15 December 1836, along with those of 38 of his supporters. However, the great majority of the Manchester membership chose to remain.

In 1836 and the following year, some 50 Quakers left Manchester Meeting and another 300 left other meetings throughout the country, including those in Bristol, Birmingham, Tottenham and Plymouth. After Manchester, the largest group leaving were from Kendal. Crewdson's daughter Margaret (1808-1864) had married a fellow-Quaker, Henry Waterhouse, in 1832, and they, like her father, resigned from Hardshaw East Monthly Meeting in 1836.

The Beaconite split also divided some Quaker families on partisan lines, as with the Braithwaites and the Lloyd banking family, and ended commercial relations, as with the Benson and Cropper partnership.

== The Evangelical Friends ==
Together with his brother-in-law, the former Hardshaw East Quaker elder William Boulton, Crewdson founded the short-lived "Evangelical Friends", who were termed "Beaconites" by Quakers. They first met for Sunday worship on 18 September 1836 at an infant school in Manchester, before opening their 600-seat chapel at Chorlton-on-Medlock on Sunday 17 December 1837.

They incorporated into their worship baptism and taking the Lord's Supper, which had been rejected by Quakers as rituals that obstructed the relationship between the worshipper and God. The Evangelical Friends held a Yearly Meeting in the style of a Quaker Yearly Meeting in London in 1837 and for a short while published a monthly journal, The Inquirer.

An active abolitionist, Crewdson attended the June 1840 World Anti-Slavery Convention in London.

Crewdson is on the right of centre at the back in this painting of the 1840 World Anti-Slavery Convention. Move cursor to identify him or click icon to enlarge.

== Legacy ==
Crewdson died at Bowness on 8 May 1844 and was buried at Rusholme Road Cemetery, Chorlton-on-Medlock, Manchester.

The Evangelical Friends did not flourish and gradually dispersed in the decade after Crewdson's death. Many joined the Plymouth Brethren and brought Quaker simplicity of worship to that movement. Notable Quakers who moved to the Brethren included John Eliot Howard and Robert Mackenzie Beverley.

The Beaconite chapel, which was sparsely attended, languished and was sold to the Baptists in 1844, the year of Crewdson's death.

In 1870, the last surviving member of the 1835 Visiting Committee, Doctor Edward Ash, wrote that the committee had been mistaken in suspending Crewdson's membership.

It has been suggested that A Beacon to the Society of Friends was twenty years ahead of its time and that by the 20th century some Quaker evangelicals had reached a position close to that of Crewdson in the 1830s.

== Publications ==
- Hints on a Musical Festival at Manchester, (1827)
- Trade to the East Indies(c.1827), referring to the Slave Trade.
- Andrew Fuller's Religious Declension, abridgment (1829)
- Baxter's Saint's Rest, abridgment (1829)
- The Doctrine of the New Testament on Prayer (1831)
- A Beacon to the Society of Friends (1835)
- A Defence of the Beacon (1836)
- The Beacon Controversy Between the Society of Friends and Isaac Crewdson (1836)
- Water Baptism an Ordinance of Christ (1837)
- Water Baptism and the Lord's Supper: Scriptural arguments in behalf of the perpetual obligation of these ordinances (1837)
- The Trumpet Blown, or an Appeal to the Society of Friends (1838)
- Observations on the New Birth (1844)
