= George Bland (priest) =

English clergyman

George Bland (1806–1880) was a nineteenth-century English clergyman. He was Archdeacon of Lindisfarne then Archdeacon of Northumberland.

== Life ==
Bland's mother was a sister of Edward Maltby, Bishop of Chichester then Durham. He was educated at Gonville and Caius College, Cambridge, and ordained in 1831. He began his ecclesiastical career as Domestic Chaplain to his uncle at Chichester after which he was the incumbent at St Peter, Slinfold. In 1844 Maltby appointed him Archdeacon of Lindisfarne. He married Frances Sibyl Collinson in 1846.

He was transferred to Northumberland (to which a residentiary canonry at Durham Cathedral was annexed) in 1853, gaining also the Rectory of St Mary-le-Bow, Durham in 1856. and died in post on 17 February 1880. His wife died in 1897.

Church of England titles
Preceded by Edward Thomas Bigge	Archdeacon of Lindisfarne; 1844–1853	Succeeded by Richard Charles Coxe
Preceded by William Forbes Raymond	Archdeacon of Northumberland; 1853–1880	Succeeded by Henry William Watkins
