= William Thomas (archdeacon of Northumberland) =

Church of England priest (1927–2020)

William Jordison Thomas (16 December 1927 – 31 January 2020) was the Archdeacon of Northumberland from 1982 to 1993.

Born on 16 December 1927, he was educated at Giggleswick School and did his National Service in the Royal Navy between 1946 and 1948. After graduating from King's College, Cambridge he studied for the priesthood at Ripon College Cuddesdon. He served curacies at St Anthony of Egypt, Newcastle upon Tyne and Berwick Parish Church and incumbencies at Alwinton, Alston cum Garrigill and Glendale before his Archdeacon's appointment.

He died on 31 January 2020 and is buried in St Bartholomew's Church, Whttingham, England.

Church of England titles
Preceded by Leslie Stannard Hunter	Archdeacon of Northumberland; 1982–1993	Succeeded by Peter Elliott
