= William King (priest) =

English priest

William King B.D. (died 23 September 1590) was a Canon of Windsor from 1572 to 1590

== Career ==
He was a King's Scholar at Eton College from 1544 to 1548, and then studied at King's College, Cambridge, where he graduated BA in 1553, MA in 1556 and BD in 1570.

He was appointed:

- Rector of Howick, Northumberland 1560–1566
- Archdeacon of Northumberland 1561–1566
- Prebendary of Canterbury Cathedral 1565–1590
- Vicar of Appledore, Kent 1568–1576
- Rector of Kingston, Kent 1569–1573
- Chaplain to Queen Elizabeth

He was deprived of his archdeaconry in 1566 due to continual absence.

He was appointed to the ninth stall in St George's Chapel, Windsor Castle in 1572, a position he held until 1590.
