= John Withypoll =

16th-century English politician

John Withypoll (born by 1483), of Malmesbury, Wiltshire, was an English politician.

He was a Member of Parliament (MP) for Bossiney in 1547.
