= Archdeacon of Northumberland =

Church of England ecclesiastical office

The Archdeacon of Northumberland is a senior ecclesiastical officer within the Diocese of Newcastle. As such she or he is responsible for the disciplinary supervision of the clergy within the geographical area of the archdeaconry.

== History ==
The first archdeacons in the diocese occur after the Norman Conquest – around the same time the post of archdeacon first started to occur elsewhere in England. There is no evidence of more than one archdeacon in the diocese until the mid-12th century, when two lines of office holders start to appear in sources. The titles "Archdeacon of Durham" and "Archdeacon of Northumberland" are not recorded until later in the century, although it is possible to discern which of the two lines became which post. Here are listed the archdeacons of the junior of two unnamed lines, then all those called Archdeacon of Northumberland.

The ancient Archdeaconry of Northumberland was part of the Diocese of Durham until 23 May 1882, when the Diocese of Newcastle was formed from it and the Archdeaconry of Lindisfarne.

== List of archdeacons ==
=== High Medieval ===
Junior archdeacons

- bef. 1127–aft. 1153: Ranulph
- bef. 1155–aft. 1174: John

Archdeacons of Northumberland

- bef. November 1174–aft. March 1195: William du Puiset
- bef. April 1197–aft. 15 February 1203: G. de Perche
- bef. 1 November 1211–May 1217 (res.): Richard Marsh (also Archdeacon of Richmond from February 1213)
- bef. 1 June 1218–aft. 11 November 1239: Alan de Lenna
- 26 July 1241: unknown archdeacon
- 5 April 1249–bef. 13 January 1254 (d.): Thomas de Anesty
- bef. 21 October 1256–bef. July 1257 (res.): Robert de Sancta Agatha
- bef. 9 October 1264–bef. 1269: Roger de Herteburn
- bef. 23 September 1271–c. 1272: Richard de Middleton
- bef. 8 November 1275–c. 1280: Thomas de Birland
- c. April 1281 (res.): William de la Corner
- bef. 24 February 1291–c. 1311: Nicholas de Welles

=== Late Medieval ===
- 4 March–December 1312 (d.): Robert Pickering
- 14 December 1312 – 1313 (res.): John de Nassington
- ?–1372 (res.): Thomas Charlton
- February 1328 – 1340 (d.): John Charlton
- 5 April 1340–bef. 1349: Edmund Haward
- bef. 1349–10 March 1362 (exch.): William de Salopia
- 10 March–bef. September 1362 (d.): John de Bamburgh
- 10 September 1362 – 17 August 1369 (exch.): Richard de Bernard Castle
- 17–18 August 1369 (res.): John de Kyngeston
- 19 August–26 November 1369 (exch.): Thomas Duffield
- 26 November 1369 – 23 January 1371 (exch.): William de Beverley
- 23 January 1371–?: John de Derby
- c. October 1400: Louis Cardinal de Fieschi (cardinal-deacon of Sant'Adriano al Foro)
- November 1400–?: John Repham
- ?–5 August 1405 (exch.): John de Dalton
- 5 August 1405–bef. December 1409: William Morwyk
- 5 December 1409 – 15 August 1410 (res.): John Rickingale
- 1 February–27 April 1411 (res.): Henry Eton
- 13 October–10 December 1411 (res.): John Akum
- 10 December 1411–bef. March 1422 (res.): John Rickingale (again)
- 27 March 1422 – 8 November 1427 (exch.): Marmaduke Lumley
- 9 November 1427–aft. 1435: Robert Burton
- bef. 1456–bef. 1493 (d.): Robert Mason
- February 1493–bef. 1528: Ralph Scrope
- bef. March 1528–bef. 1558 (d.): Robert Davell

=== Early modern ===
- 3 November 1558 – 25 September 1559 (deprived): William Carter (deprived)
- c. 1559–bef. 1566 (deprived): William King (later canon at Windsor)
- 21 August 1566–bef. 1573 (res.): Ralph Lever
- 20 October 1573–bef. 1578: Francis Bunney
- 25 September 1578 – 17 July 1581 (res.): John Bolde
- 29 October 1581–?: Ralph Tunstall
- 24 October 1599 – 1603 (res.): William Morton
- 13 April 1604 – 6 August 1619 (res.): John Cradock
- 7 August 1619 – 1620 (res.): Gabriel Clark
- 13 September 1620 – 1633: Francis Burgoyne
- c. February 1633–bef. 1636 (res.): Joseph Naylor
- 24 November 1636–?: William Flathers
- 9 May 1638–bef. 1644 (d.): Everard Gower
- c. August 1633–12 October 1676 (d.): Isaac Basire (sequestered)
- 30 October 1676 – 20 April 1685 (d.): William Turner
- 5 October 1685 – 10 November 1722 (d.): John Morton
- 27 February 1723 – 15 March 1758 (d.): Thomas Sharp
- 17 August 1758 – 6 December 1761 (d.): Thomas Robinson
- 21 April 1762 – 28 April 1792 (d.): John Sharp
- May 1792–20 April 1812 (d.): Robert Thorp
- May 1812–30 January 1826 (d.): Reynold Bouyer
- February 1826–13 March 1842 (d.): Thomas Singleton
- 9 April 1842–bef. 1853 (res.): William Forbes Raymond

On 27 August 1842, an Order in Council divided the archdeaconry in two (effective that day), creating the new archdeaconry of Lindisfarne.

- 24 February 1853 – 17 February 1880 (d.): George Bland

=== Late modern ===
- 1880–June 1882 (res.): Henry Watkins
- 1882–23 September 1905 (d.): George Hamilton
- 1906–1917 (ret.): James Henderson
- 1918–16 July 1931 (d.): Charles Blackett-Ord
- 1931–1939 (res.): Leslie Hunter
- 1939–1954 (res.): Charles Ritchie
- 1955–1963 (res.): Ian White-Thomson
- 1963–1982 (ret.): Christopher Unwin
- 1983–1992 (ret.): William Thomas (afterwards archdeacon emeritus)
- 1993–2005 (ret.): Peter Elliott
- 10 April 2005 – 20 October 2018: Geoff Miller (became Dean of Newcastle; Acting Dean, 4 February – 20 October 2018)
- 24 March 2019 – November 2020: Mark Wroe (Acting since 4 February 2018; became Bishop of Berwick in January 2021)
- 23 September 2021 onwards: Rachel Wood (was acting archdeacon from November 2020)

== Sources ==
- Greenaway, Diana E. (1971), Fasti Ecclesiae Anglicanae 1066–1300, vol. 2, pp. 39–42
- Jones, B. (1963), Fasti Ecclesiae Anglicanae 1300–1541, vol. 6, pp. 113–115
- Joyce M., Horn; David M., Smith; Mussett, Patrick (2004), Fasti Ecclesiae Anglicanae 1541–1857, vol. 11, pp. 83–85
