= Robert Mackenzie Beverley =

English author, magistrate, and controversialist

Robert Mackenzie Beverley (1798-1868) was an author, magistrate, and controversialist. He was born in the town of Beverley in Yorkshire, attended Richmond School, and matriculated at Trinity College, University of Cambridge in 1816. He received the degree of LL.B. in 1821, after which he lived at Beverley, in due course becoming a Justice of the Peace and Deputy Lieutenant.

== Career ==
Beverley was born into a Quaker family, but in 1836-1837, in the Beaconite Controversy, he was one of the figures who followed Isaac Crewdson in resigning from the Society of Friends. He was among a number who then joined the Plymouth Brethren. As the Quakers did not practise baptism, he was baptised by the Brethren at Oxford in October 1838; Henry Bellenden Bulteel performed the service.

Beverley wrote books, satires and poems on mostly religious themes, but some on politics, both ecclesiastical and temporal, as well. He made at least one foray into biology with an essay in which he attacked the nascent Darwinian theory. He also wrote some epic poetry but achieved no lasting acclaim. He is mentioned in some other writings of the day; largely in response to his attacks (e.g., in Anacalypsis by Godfrey Higgins).

In 1833, he published A letter to H.R.H. the Duke of Gloucester—the Duke of Gloucester was the chancellor of Cambridge at the time—regarding what he believed to be the corrupt state of the university. Much of its content was immoderate to a degree that provoked retaliation and disapproving (including a rebuff from The Times).

Beverley wrote on a range of other subjects that were often of a controversial nature. He died in Scarborough on 3 November 1868.

== Evolution ==
Beverley was a staunch opponent of Charles Darwin's theory of evolution. In 1867, he authored The Darwinian Theory of the Transmutation of Species. The book contains criticism of natural selection:

It is to be observed that the two grand principles of the theory are avowedly metaphors. Natural Selection is a metaphorical expression, and the Struggle for Existence is used in ‘a large and metaphorical sense.’ These are the two pillars of the whole theory; Natural Selection and the Struggle for Existence represent and express everything that Mr Darwin has to urge; take them away and nothing remains, and yet they are both metaphors. If these terms are metaphors, they are not realities, but verbal pictures or shadows, and are, therefore, vicious terms in a scientific disquisition. Neither are they only now and then, and by way of illustration, introduced, though even that would scarcely be admissible in handling the great revelation of the existence and origin of beings; but they occur in almost every page [in On the Origin of Species], to the exclusion of other terms — so that from first to last we are led by a metaphor at every step, as the poor belated traveller is sometimes led by Will-o’-the-wisp into the fatal morass.

== Some of Beverley's works, alone or as part author ==
- Horrida Hystrix, Satyricon Castoreanum (1826)
- Jubal, A Dramatic Poem (1827)
- An essay on the Zodiacs of Dendera (1831)
- The Tombs of the Prophets: A Lay Sermon on the Corruptions of the Church of Christ (1831)
- A Letter to his Grace the Archbishop of York, on the Present Corrupt State of the Church of England (1831)
- A Second Letter to his Grace the Archbishop of York, on the Present Corrupt State of the Church of England (1832)
- A Letter to Lord Henley, on the Deficiencies of his Plan of Church Reform (1833)
- A Letter to His Royal Highness the Duke of Gloucester on the Present Corrupt State of the University of Cambridge (1833)
- Letters on the Present State of the Visible Church of Christ: Addressed to John Angel James (1836)
- The Wrongs of the Caffre Nation; a Narrative (1837)
- An inquiry into the Scriptural Doctrine of Christian Ministry (1840)
- The Church of England Examined by Scripture and Tradition: in an answer to lectures by the Rev. John Venn (1843)
- The Redan, a Poem (1856)
- Spiritual Worship, a Lay Discourse (1865)
- The Darwinian Theory of the Transmutation of Species (1867)
