= William Turner (priest) =

English Anglican priest

William Turner, D.D. (10 May 1647 – 20 April 1685) was an English Anglican priest in the 17th century.

Turner was educated at Trinity College, Oxford. He was Rector of Stanhope and Archdeacon of Northumberland from 1776 until his death on 10 November 1722.
