= Sugley =

Coordinates: 54°58′43.18″N 1°42′47.02″W

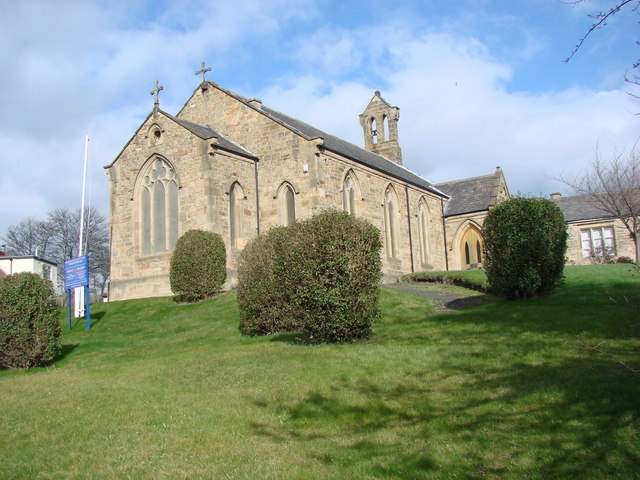
- Holy Saviour

- Location within Tyne and Wear
- Metropolitan borough: Newcastle upon Tyne
- Metropolitan county: Tyne and Wear
- Region: North East
- Country: England
- Sovereign state: United Kingdom
- Police: Northumbria
- Fire: Tyne and Wear
- Ambulance: North East

Sugley is an area of Newcastle upon Tyne adjacent to Lemington in the county of Tyne and Wear, England: its parish church is Holy Saviour, Sugley.

== History ==
Sugley was formerly a township in the parish of Newburn, in 1866 Sugley became a separate civil parish, on 1 April 1935 the parish was abolished and merged with Newburn. In 1931 the parish had a population of 1769.
