= William Ord of Fenham =

English land and mine owner

William Ord (c. 1715 – 24 January 1768) was an English land and mine owner.

== Life ==
He was the second son of Thomas Ord of Fenham and Anne Bacon and inherited the family estates at Fenham and Newminster Abbey on the death of his elder brother John, in 1745.

Ord was High Sheriff of Northumberland in 1747, and in that year received the Freedom of the City of Newcastle-upon-Tyne.

In 1750 he bought the ancient Manor and estate at Whitfield, Northumberland, from the financially pressed Whitfield family. He developed lead and silver mining at Whitfield and coal mining at Benwell (which estate he bought in 1756) and at Fenham.

== Family ==
In 1746 Ord married Anne Dillingham, heiress to estates at West Langton and East Langton, Leicestershire.

His eldest son, William (1752–1789), High Sheriff of Northumberland in 1777, married Eleanor Brandling of Gosforth, daughter of the Member of Parliament Charles Brandling, and William Ord MP was their son; on her husband's death she remarried Thomas Creevey. His second son, Rev. James Ord (1761–1836), who inherited the Langton estates, married Barbara Brandling of Gosforth.

== Notes ==
Parliament of Great Britain
Preceded by Edward Wortley; Richard Heath	Member of Parliament for Bossiney; 1747–1754; With: Richard Heath 1747–1752; William Montagu 1752–1754	Succeeded by Edwin Sandys; Edward Wortley Montagu
