= Reynold Bouyer =

English clergyman (1741-1826)

Reynold Gideon Bouyer (24 December 1741 – 3 January 1826) was an English clergyman, archdeacon of Northumberland.

== Life ==
Born in London to a Dutch father and English mother, Bouyer was educated at Leyden in Holland before being admitted to Trinity College, Cambridge in 1761. Migrating to Jesus College in 1763, he graduated LL.B. in 1769. However, his studies had been interrupted for a time while he acted as a tutor to Robert Bertie, second son of the third Duke of Ancaster, who was at Eton. After graduating he was appointed perpetual curate of Edenham in Lincolnshire, near the Grimsthorpe Castle seat of the Bertie family, and following his ordination in 1771 he was presented by them to the valuable Lincolnshire livings of Willoughby-cum-Sloothby and Theddlethorpe St Helen, which he held until 1811.

In 1785 he was recommended by Queen Charlotte to Shute Barrington, who collated him to the prebend of Preston in Salisbury Cathedral. When Barrington moved to Durham, Bouyer followed him, eventually obtaining three prebends and the rectory of Howick and the vicarage of North Allerton, with the chapelries of Brompton and Dighton, all in the diocese of Durham. He was collated to the archdeaconry of Northumberland, 9 May 1812, and died at Durham 30 January 1826. He is buried in Durham Cathedral.

Bouyer was an energetic reformer. During his time in Lincolnshire he was engaged in a variety of efforts at employing the poor, promoting wool production and the worsted industry, and founding the Lincolnshire Stuff Balls at Alford in 1785. He established a scheme whereby parishes opened spinning schools, in which children were rewarded for learning to knit and to spin; he publicised these in a pamphlet called An account of the origin, proceedings, and intentions of the ... Society for the Promotion of Industry in the Southern District of the Parts of Lindsey in the County of Lincoln.

He continued educational reform on Durham, publishing a Comparative View of the two new Systems of Education for the Infant Poor, in a Charge delivered to the Clergy of Durham, 1811. This led to his involvement in the reform of the Society for the Promotion of Christian Knowledge; he failed to persuade them to establish parochial libraries, so he established them at his own expense in every parish in Northumberland. They contained upwards of 30,000 volumes, which cost him about £1,400, although he was supplied with them by the SPCK at 40 per cent under prime cost. These libraries were placed under the care of the parochial ministers, and the books were lent gratis to the parishioners.
