= William Miller Ord =

British medical scientist (1834–1902)

William Miller Ord FRCP
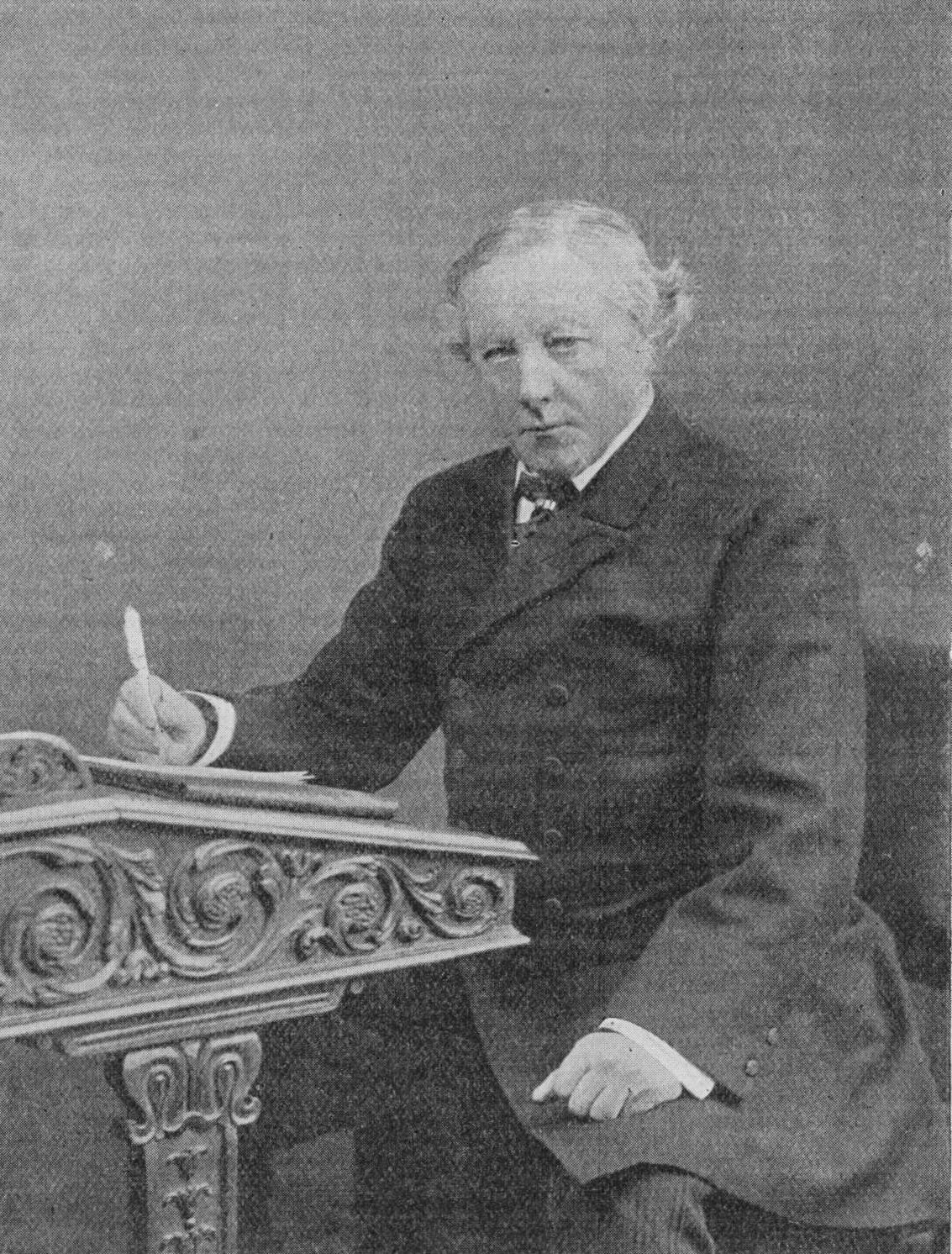
- Born: September 23, 1834
- Died: May 14, 1902 (aged 67)
- Education: St Thomas' Hospital, London University
- Years active: 1852-1902
- Known for: describing Ord's thyroiditis
- Medical career
- Profession: surgeon
- Institutions: Royal College of Surgeons of England
- Research: gout

Signature
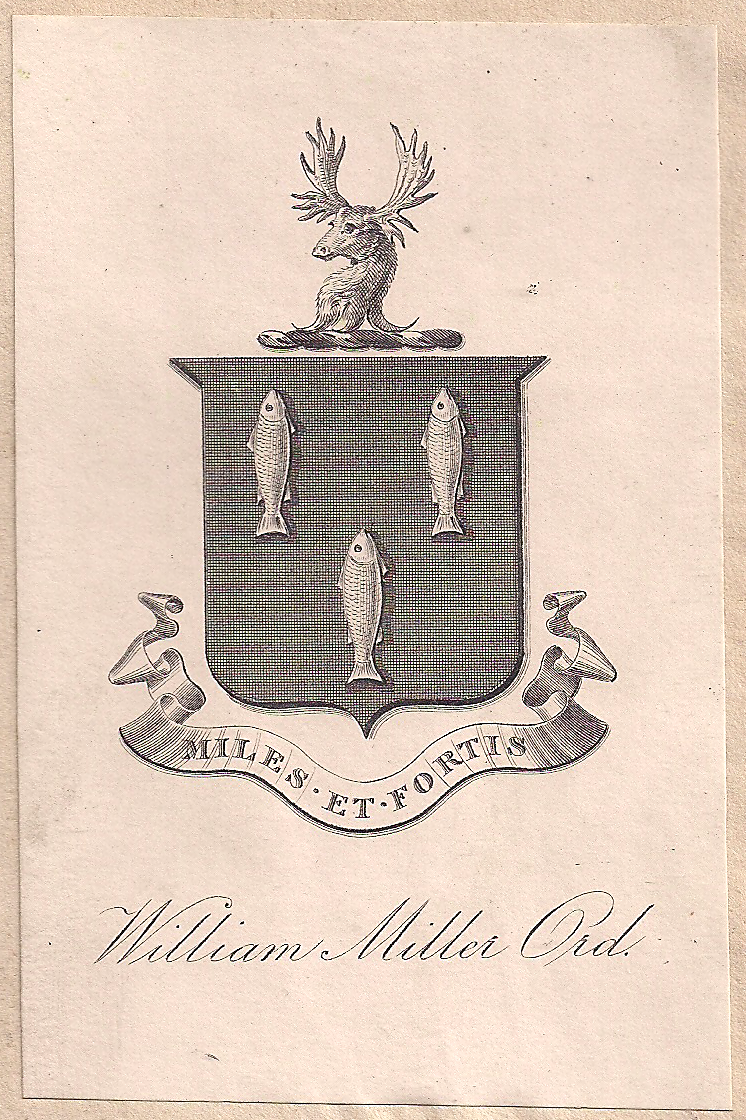

William Miller Ord, FRCP (23 September 1834 – 14 May 1902) was a British medical scientist. He was a surgeon at St. Thomas Hospital in London, where he worked for 50 years.

== Biography ==
Ord was born in 1834, the son of George Ord, MRCS, a surgeon who practiced in Brixton. He received his medical education at St Thomas' Hospital, where he entered in 1852, and at London University. He became a member of the Royal College of Surgeons in 1855, and a member of the Royal College of Physicians in 1869 (later elected a Fellow in 1875).

At St. Thomas′, he was successively surgical registrar, house surgeon, lecturer in comparative anatomy, lecturer in physiology, assistant physician lecturer in medicine, and physician. He was also elected Dean of the Medical School.

In 1879 he described Ord's thyroiditis.

He was an active member of the Medical Society of London, and was president of the society in 1885.

Ord died at The Hall, in Salisbury, residence of his son, on 14 May 1902.

== Selected publications ==
- Notes on Comparative Anatomy (1871)
- On the Relation of Uric Acid to Gout (1874)
- On Myxoedema, a term proposed to be applied to an essential condition in the cretinoid infection observed in middle aged women. Transactions of The Medical - Chirurgical Society Of London 1878; 61: 57
- On the Influence of Colloids Upon Crystalline Form and Cohesion (1879)
- On Some Disorders of Nutrition Related With Affections of the Nervous System (1885)
- Report of a committee of the Clinical Society of London nominated December 14, 1883, to investigate the subject of myxoedema. Trans. Clin. Soc. Lond. 1888; 21 (Suppl)
