= Robert Beverley (MP) =

16th-century English politician

Robert Beverley was one of two members of parliament for the rotten borough of Mitchell, Cornwall, during the first parliament of 1553.
