= William Montagu (Royal Navy officer) =

British Royal Navy captain

Captain William Montagu
- Born: 1720?
- Died: 1757
- Occupation: Royal Navy captain

William Montagu (1720? – 1757) was a British Royal Navy captain and politician.

== Biography ==
Montagu was the son of Edward Richard Montagu, viscount Hinchinbroke (d. 1722), by Elizabeth, daughter of Alexander Popham of Littlecote, Wiltshire, and younger brother of John Montagu, fourth earl of Sandwich. He was on 20 September 1740 promoted to be lieutenant of the Defiance, one of the ships going out to the West Indies with Sir Chaloner Ogle, and in her was present at the unsuccessful attack on Cartagena in March–April 1741. He was afterwards moved into the Launceston, one of the squadron with Commodore Warren at the Leeward Islands, and by Warren he was promoted, on 23 May 1744, to the command of the Mercury sloop. On the night of 20 October 1744, as the ship was lying at Antigua, a boat prowling round would not answer when hailed. Montagu ordered the sentry to fire at her, and the boat then came alongside with a negro in her, shot through the calf of the leg, who, through the incompetence of the surgeon of the Mercury, bled to death. The surgeon was dismissed the service by sentence of court-martial, but Commodore Knowles, apparently believing that Montagu was to blame for the man's death, suspended him from his command, and sent him under arrest on board the Eltham for a passage to England. Despite Montagu's appeal, Knowles refused either to try him by court-martial or to hand him over to the civil power at Antigua, and Montagu in the Eltham was carried to New England, where, after he had been seven months under arrest, he was promoted by Warren to the post-ship Mermaid on 23 May 1745 (Montagu's petition to the first lord of the admiralty, not dated, read 14 August 1745 in Captain's Letters, M. 11). On arriving in England in August, he vainly petitioned the first lord of the admiralty to try Knowles, who had just returned to England, for his tyrannical conduct. In a civil suit (25 June 1752), however, Montagu was successful. Heavy damages, it is said, would have been awarded, but his counsel only demanded a nominal penalty often guineas and the costs of the suit.

Meantime he was appointed to the Prince Edward on 20 August 1745, and in July 1746 to the Bristol of 50 guns, one of the ships in the squadron under George Anson in the following spring. In the action of 3 May Montagu's conduct was described as extremely brilliant. He closely engaged the 74-gun ship Invincible; Captain Fincher of the Pembroke, thinking Montagu's little ship was overmatched, tried to push in between her and the Frenchman, but, finding there was not sufficient room, hailed the Bristol to put her helm a starboard or the Pembroke would run foul of her. To which Montagu hailed back, 'Run foul of me and be damned; neither you nor any man in the world shall come between me and my enemy.' And he stuck to the In- vincible till, with the assistance of the Devonshire, her guns were silenced, when, exclaiming 'Come, my boys, we must have another of them,' he ran his ship alongside the Diamant of 66 guns, which, after a sharp contest, struck to the Bristol (Gent. Mag. 1747, p. 272). The story is told in a letter from Portsmouth, dated 30 May 1747; but neither in his official letter to the admiralty, nor in his private letter to the Duke of Bedford, does Anson say anything about it or about Montagu (Barrow, Life of Anson, pp. 162–165; Correspondence of John, fourth Duke of Bedford, i. 213–15). As the Invincible finally struck to the Prince George, Anson may very well have preferred not describing her as a beaten ship when the Prince George closed her. The writer in the 'Gentleman's Magazine' attributes his silence to jealousy.

During the rest of the year the Bristol was employed on detached service and independent cruising. On 12 December Montagu fell in with Rear-admiral Boscawen in the Namur off Madeira, and anchored there with him. Boscawen, who had charge of a large convoy of East Indiamen, wrote to Anson on the 21st that he had been obliged to confine Montagu, at the desire of the governor, for threatening the life of one of the captains of the Indiaman (Barrow, p. 160; Addit. MS. 15955). The Bristol, he added, was in great want of stores, and was going to Lisbon to refit. It was found necessary for her to go to England, and to be paid off. In September 1748, however, Montagu was appointed to her again; and in January 1749-50 he was moved into the Cumberland, guardship at Chatham. In November 1745 he was returned to parliament for the county of Huntingdon, and in February 1752 for the borough of Bossiney in Cornwall. He died in the early part of 1757.

Montagu is said to have been known in the navy of his time as 'Mad Montagu,' and several anecdotes are related of his eccentricities. But though Charnock, who tells them, presumably received them from William Locker and from Forbes, it is not altogether improbable that they had been told, before their time, of men of the older navy. Montagu married Charlotte, daughter of Francis Nailour of Offord Darcy in Huntingdonshire, but died without issue (Collins, Peerage, iii. 302).
