= Leslie Hunter (bishop) =

British Church of England bishop (1890–1983)

Leslie Stannard Hunter, DD (2 May 1890 – 15 July 1983) was the second Bishop of Sheffield from 1939 until 1962. Born on 2 May 1890 and educated at Kelvinside Academy and New College, Oxford he was ordained in 1915 and began his career with curacies at St Peter's, Brockley and St Martin-in-the-Fields, Trafalgar Square. He was then a Residentiary Canon at Newcastle Cathedral after which he was Vicar of Barking. In 1930 he became Archdeacon of Northumberland, a post he held until his elevation to the Episcopate.

Hunter became the Bishop of Sheffield in 1939 and the chair of governors of the William Temple College. He was a great supporter of the Principal Edith Batten who steered the college towards addressing key issues of the day and how they effected Christian faith. He established the Sheffield Industrial Mission in 1944.

Hunter was an eminent author, he died on 15 July 1983.

== Notes ==
Church of England titles
Preceded by Leonard Hedley Burrows	Bishop of Sheffield; 1939 – 1962	Succeeded by Francis John Taylor
