= Martyn Percy =

British academic and theologian (born 1962)

Professor Martyn Percy
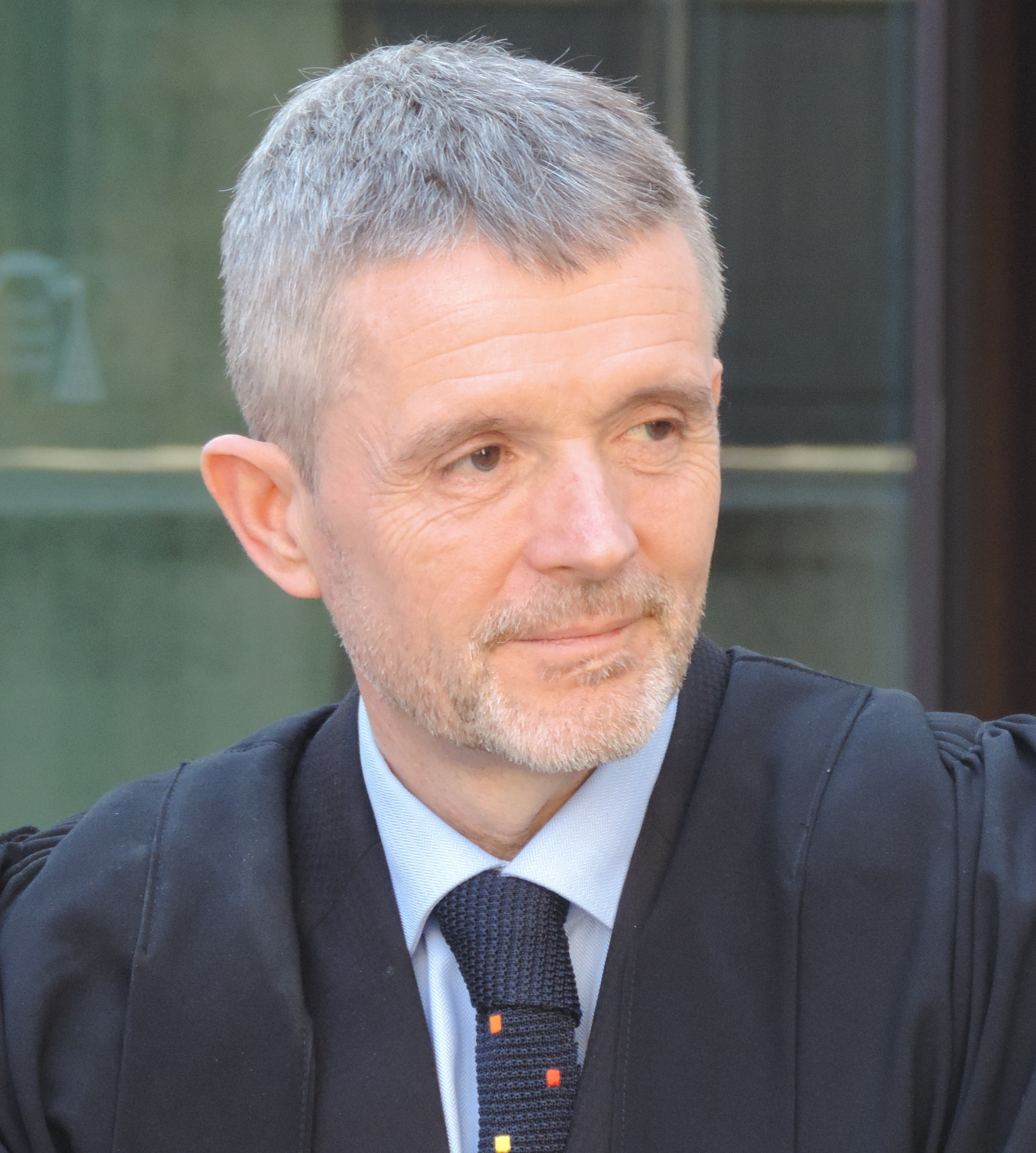
- Percy in 2017
- Born: Martyn William Percy; 31 July 1962 (age 64)
- Political party: Labour Party
- Spouse: Emma Percy (m. 1989)

Ecclesiastical career
- Religion: Christianity
- Church: Anglican
- Ordained: 1990 (deacon); 1991 (priest)
- Offices held: Dean of Christ Church (2014–2022)

Academic background
- Education: University of Bristol; King's College, London; University of Sheffield
- Thesis: "Signs, Wonders and Church Growth" (1993)
- Doctoral advisor: Peter B. Clarke; Christoph Schwöbel

Academic work
- Discipline: Sociology, Anthropology and Theology
- Sub-discipline: Ecclesiology; pastoral theology; contexual theologies
- Institutions: Christ's College, Cambridge; Lincoln Theological Institute; Ripon College Cuddesdon; Christ Church, Oxford

Martyn William Percy (born 31 July 1962) is a British academic, educator, social scientist, and Anglican priest. He served as Principal of Ripon College Cuddesdon from 2004 to 2014 and as the 45th Dean of Christ Church, Oxford, from 2014 to 2022. Percy's publications address ecclesiology, Anglican identity, contemporary Christianity, and the sociology of religion.

He is Professor of Religion and Culture at the University of Saint Joseph in Macau.

== Early life and education ==
Percy was born on 31 July 1962. He was educated at the University of Bristol (BA), the University of Sheffield (MA), and King's College London, where he completed a PhD in 1993. He trained for ordination at Cranmer Hall, Durham between 1988 and 1990.

== Career ==
Percy taught in the Faculty of Theology and Religion, University of Oxford, as well as in Sociology, and was a fellow of the Said Business School at the university. He has also served as Professor of Theological Education at King's College London and a professorial research fellow at Heythrop College, University of London. He has also served as a visiting professor of the Institute for the Study of Values at the University of Winchester, a founding fellow of the Center for Theologically Engaged Anthropology at the University of Georgia, and an adjunct professor at Hartford Seminary, Connecticut. He is an emeritus canon of Salisbury Cathedral, having previously served as an honorary canon. In 2018 he became a fellow of King's College London, and a fellow of Harris Manchester College, Oxford. From 2022 to 2024, he held an academic appointment at Virginia Theological Seminary.

With effect from 1 September 2024, Percy has been appointed as Professor of Religion and Culture in the Faculty of Religious Studies and Philosophy at University of Saint Joseph in Macao. And for the Xavier Centre for Memory and Identity. He also holds the post of Provost of Ming Hua Theological College (part of Hong Kong Sheng Kung Hui - Hong Kong Anglican Church) . In 2025 he was also appointed to serve as Honorary Canon Theologian for the Convocation of Episcopal Churches in Europe (the American Episcopal congregations in Europe).

Percy's theological outlook is rooted in his long-standing commitment to middle-way Anglicanism. His writings fall into three distinct-but-related groups: ecclesiology; contemporary Christianity, religious movements and sociological trends; and anthropological interpretations of denominations and congregations; and spiritual devotional writings. He has also written extensively about theological education, as well as contextual, pastoral and practical theology.

In 2013, The Times Literary Supplement praised Percy for his work towards unity within the Anglican Communion and the Church of England, describing him as displaying a "peaceable, polite and restrained" approach whilst "making peace between competing communities of conviction".

== Ordained ministry ==
Percy was ordained in the Church of England as a deacon in 1990 and as a priest in 1991. From 1990 to 1994, he served his curacy at St Andrew's Church, Bedford in the Diocese of St Albans. He was then chaplain of Christ's College, Cambridge from 1994, and director of studies for theology and religion at Sidney Sussex College, Cambridge from 1995. From 1997 to 2004, he the founding director of the Lincoln Theological Institute; initially independent, it became part of the University of Manchester in 2003. In addition, he was an honorary curate of Holy Trinity Millhouses in the Diocese of Sheffield, and an honorary canon of Sheffield Cathedral.

=== Cuddesdon ===
From 2004 to 2014, Percy was Principal of Ripon College Cuddesdon, an Anglican theological college near Oxford. During his tenure, the college expanded significantly by incorporating the Oxford Ministry Course and the West of England Ministerial Training Course, becoming the largest centre for Anglican ordination training in the United Kingdom. Percy also oversaw the construction of the Bishop Edward King Chapel and a new education centre, Harriet Monsell House.

During Percy's tenure, the multi-award-winning Bishop Edward King Chapel (shortlisted for the Stirling Prize in 2013) and a new education centre (Harriet Monsell House) were built.

=== Deanery of Christ Church ===
Percy was the (45th) Dean of Christ Church in Oxford from 2014 to April 2022. He was the first dean to be democratically elected by the governing body, and instituted to the deanery on 4 October 2014. Christ Church is the only academic institution in the world which is also a cathedral – being the seat of the Bishop of Oxford. In common with other cathedral deans, Percy, as Dean of Christ Church, was senior priest of the Diocese of Oxford. Percy's closing years in office as Dean (roughly from 2018 onwards) were marked by protracted disputes on reformation in the governance of the college.

=== Later ministry ===
In 2022, Percy announced that he would be leaving the Church of England. From 2022 to 2024, he was a visiting scholar at the Virginia Theological Seminary. Since 2024, he has held permission to officiate in two Scottish Episcopal Church dioceses; Diocese of Aberdeen and Orkney, and Diocese of Edinburgh. He is also the canon theologian to the Convocation of Episcopal Churches in Europe, a jurisdiction of the American Episcopal Church.

== Christ Church disputes ==
In November 2018, Percy was suspended amid his advocacy of reforms to modern governance within Christ Church. He faced internal tribunal charges that were dismissed by a retired High Court judge in August 2019. A separate safeguarding investigation in 2020 found no evidence of misconduct. During the period of dispute, supporters of Percy raised over £150,000 to help cover the cost of his legal fees, which Christ Church had refused to pay.

In early 2022, following mediation, Percy agreed to step down; the college announced a settlement, and he left office in April that year. In November 2022, the UK Charity Commission issued a warning to Christ Church regarding handling of dispute funds and appointed an independent reviewer to look into governance structures.

One of Britain's most senior Court of Appeal judges, Dame Sarah Asplin, President of Tribunals for the Church of England, carried out a detailed investigation of one safeguarding allegation made against Percy. On 28 May 2021, she ruled that it would be "entirely disproportionate" to refer any such claim to a clergy disciplinary tribunal

In 2022 Percy announced that he was leaving the Church of England, though he would remain Episcopalian-Anglican. He is licensed to minister in Scotland, Europe, Hong Kong and Macao.

=== Responses ===
On May 13, 2022 Prospect Magazine published an article which included extensive reference to his experience with Christ Church citing the deliberate weaponization of safeguarding by elements and individuals within the Church of England as one of his major concerns. On 27 May 2022 the college governing body published a statement responding.

On November 10, 2022, the Charity Commission, the government regulator, issued an Official Warning to the Governing Body of Christ Church under Section 75 of the 2011 Charities Act for "mismanagement and/or misconduct by the trustees" in their campaign against the Dean, and recorded that £6.6 million had been spent in their actions taken against Percy. The published Christ Church accounts also recorded an £8 million decline in donations during the four year dispute.

The warning stated that "in the context of a long running dispute with the former Dean, the Commission has determined there has been mismanagement and/or misconduct in the management and administration of the Charity" (para. 9).

== Theology ==
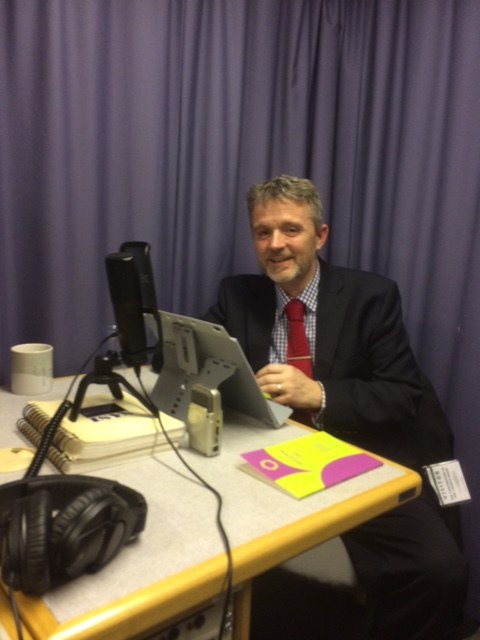
Percy recording theological reflections in 2015

Percy's theology is generally considered to represent the liberal tradition in the Church of England. His viewpoints typically argue for the "middle ground" between evangelical and catholic positions, with appeals to Anglican comprehensiveness, and the tradition of respecting theological differences. Percy's main interlocutors in his writings comprise a trinity of American theologians: Daniel W. Hardy, Urban T. Holmes III, and James F. Hopewell. Percy is a proponent of "generous orthodoxy", and argues for a theological approach that copes with "serious forms of dispute and threat[s] of schism." He draws on post-liberal theological perspectives such as those found in the works of George Lindbeck and Peter Berger. In 2018, a group of scholars from the fields of sociology, anthropology, musicology, theology and ecclesiology published a book (edited by Ian Markham and Joshua Daniels) on Percy's work to date, based on an earlier symposium engaging with Percy's writings, held at Virginia Theological Seminary (Washington DC) in 2016. The subsequent Reasonable Radical? Reading the Writings of Martyn Percy offers a broad guide to the compass of Percy's work.

Percy has adopted a progressive outlook on a number of social issues, such as LGBTQ rights and the ordination of women. However, his writings affirm orthodox Christian positions on the incarnation, atonement, resurrection and ascension; he has consistently defended the historicity of Jesus' healing and nature miracles. Noted for his work on fundamentalism and revivalism, for which he engages with sociology and anthropology, he was described in the academic journal Theology, by Nigel Rooms, as the British theologian who is the closest to being a "missionary anthropologist".

In 2002, Percy co-founded the Society for the Study of Anglicanism with Tom Hughson, which meets annually at the American Academy of Religion and is now in a full partnership with Virginia Theological Seminary. Percy has served as chair of committee (the oversight body) for Cliff College – a Methodist Bible college in the evangelical-charismatic tradition – and also works with a number of other evangelical groups. He is a vice-president of Modern Church and has been a member of the Faculty of Theology and Religion at the University of Oxford since 2004. From 2014-22 he has also taught for the Said Business School and for the Department of Sociology at the university.

Percy has been a regular contributor to The Guardian, The Times, Prospect Magazine, BBC Radio Four, and the BBC World Service.

== Activism and views ==
Percy is a social thinker, moralist and commentator, with his activism and writings addressing concerns for social justice and equality. On church leadership, Percy has critiqued the growing culture of managerialism in the Church of England, warning of reforms that are "driven by mission-minded middle managers" that alienate congregations and the wider public". Percy is a strong advocate of LGBTQ rights in the church and wider society.

=== Church leadership ===
Percy has been critical of Justin Welby's leadership as Archbishop of Canterbury, in particular his "managerial" style. Percy described Welby's plans to send senior clergy on leadership courses, contained in the 2014 report of the Lord Green Steering Group, as showing a poor judgment of the church's priorities and lacking in theological understanding. He went on to say that Welby's targets for efficiency, growth and success were not reflective of the Christian mission.

In August 2016, Percy renewed his criticism of Welby, describing the direction he was leading the Church of England as being "driven by mission-minded middle managers" that alienated congregations and the wider British public. He also raised further concerns about plans to divert funding away from traditional rural parishes and towards evangelical inner-city churches, warning that "it will take more to save the Church of England than a blend of the latest management theory". Percy has also commented on an emerging theological anaemia among bishops in the Church of England, and highlighted the weaknesses and risks this poses for Anglican polity. Percy's 2021 book focuses on the "humble church" and "commends humble leadership", criticizing church leadership.

=== LGBTQ rights ===
In an essay published in December 2015, Percy outlined his views on homosexuality, questioning the teaching that it is sinful and unnatural. Regarding the controversy surrounding the issue in the worldwide Anglican Communion, he noted that the church's position has alienated an increasingly progressive country, particularly the younger generation of Christians in Britain; he also called on Justin Welby to formally apologise for the church's role in introducing homophobic teachings to cultures across the British Empire, during the 19th century:

In 41 of the 53 countries within the British Commonwealth, homosexual conduct is still regarded as a serious crime. This categorisation and legal stigmatisation of homosexuality was largely 'made in England' in the nineteenth century, and imposed on cultures and emerging countries and that had not been, hitherto, homophobic. This is one of England's less wholesome exports. The Archbishop of Canterbury could begin the Primates' meeting by accepting responsibility for the part the Church of England has played in perpetrating this discrimination and the subsequent injustices – and publicly repenting of them.

Just days before the commencement of the January 2016 Anglican Communion Primates' Meeting, Percy joined with over 100 other senior Anglicans, including Alan Wilson (Bishop of Buckingham) and David Ison (Dean of St Paul's), in calling on archbishops Welby and Sentamu to acknowledge the failings of the Anglican Communion in its treatment of LGBTQ people. Following the decision of the primates to penalise the US Episcopal Church, for voting to redefine marriage at its 2015 general convention, Percy expressed his disappointment. He went on to say that the meeting's statement regarding this action, "had nothing to say about LGBT Christians, and that's a lost opportunity".

=== Politics ===
In the wake of the United Kingdom EU membership referendum in June 2016, Percy has argued that a national "failure of liberal values" was made evident by the result. He has also suggested the need for a more "broad church" approach to British party politics, potentially in the form of a new centre-left party that is "authentically rooted in modern, progressive socialism, and equally true to modern, progressive, democratic liberal values".

=== Safeguarding ===
Since 2015, Percy has been actively involved in the campaign to restore the reputation of Bishop George Bell, following the Church of England's decision to compensate a woman who alleged that she had been sexually abused by Bell. He is a member of the George Bell Group and has published a number of key articles questioning the competence of those who have presumed Bell to be a perpetrator of abuse. A subsequent independent report by Lord Carlile of Berriew found that there was no basis in law for presuming that the allegations made against Bell could have been sustained.

In March 2018, Percy called for the church to develop an independent self-regulating authority to handle safeguarding issues, arguing that the churches can only be ultimately trusted as public bodies if they voluntarily relinquish some control over their own policies and practices.

Percy's work on behalf of victims of sexual abuse in the church has continued alongside IICSA (Independent Inquiry into Child Sexual Abuse) reports focussing on the Church of England. This has included calling for better training and regulation in the churches, and greater fairness, justice and remedy for both the victims of abuse and those who may be falsely accused.

In September 2022, Andrew Carey, writing in The Church of England Newspaper, reported on the release of "Collusion", a song by Irish musicians in support of survivors and whistleblowers of abuse in the Church of England. Carey quoted a statement by Percy, originally published on the Surviving Church blog, in which Percy criticized the Church of England's handling of safeguarding complaints and called for the church to submit to "public standards of justice and truth" and provide redress for victims.

=== Women bishops ===
Following the General Synod's narrow rejection of a motion to legalise the ordination of women as bishops in November 2012, Percy wrote in The Daily Telegraph criticising church leaders for failing to create sufficient consensus about the issue. He described the view of opponents to the motion as maintaining a "conceit of modern times" by their fundamentalist rejection of diversity. He also voiced the need for the church to be "transformed by the renewal of our minds" in its approach to the inclusion of women in the Anglican Communion, by moving towards a "new future".

In February 2017, he suggested that Bishop Philip North either decline his nomination as Bishop of Sheffield or renounce the views of The Society, a conservative body which does not recognise or receive the ministry of ordained women, or men ordained by women bishops. North later withdrew his acceptance of the nomination, citing "personal attacks". In a radio discussion of North's decision, Percy refuted the accusation that his position demonstrated a form of "liberal intolerance". He reasoned that resistance to discrimination is not equivalent to intolerance.

== Personal life ==
Percy has the distinction of being the only living theologian mentioned and quoted in Dan Brown's The Da Vinci Code (chapter 55), where Sir Leigh Teabing says, "Everything you need to know about the Bible can be summed up by the great canon doctor Martyn Percy: 'The Bible did not arrive by fax from heaven.'"

Percy is also commended in Adam Sisman’s The Professor and the Parson for his role in managing a serial fraudster who was working in both church and higher education.

Percy is married to Emma Percy, who is a senior lecturer in feminist theology and the study of ministry at Aberdeen University, and a former chaplain and fellow at Trinity College, Oxford. Together they have two sons. He is a member of the Labour Party, a teetotaler and a lifelong supporter of Everton Football Club. His hobbies include running, playing squash, cinema, and listening to jazz.

In addition to the work edited by Markham and Daniel, Reasonable Radical? Reading the Writings of Martyn Percy (2017), which focuses on Percy's theology, the Northern Irish poet Peter McDonald's Five Psalms for Martyn Percy reworks Psalms 8, 25, 94, 98 and 114 in poetic form to explore aspects of Percy's life using elegy, lament, hope, justice and vindication.

== Published works ==
| Title | Publisher | Year | ISBN | Notes |
|---|---|---|---|---|
| The Stature of Liberty: Transforming Religion and Society | SUNY Press: State University of New York | 2025 | | |
| The Exiled Church: Reckoning with Faith in Secular Society | Canterbury Press | 2025 | ISBN 9781786226273 | |
| Faith in Secular Life: Implicit Religion and Sublimated Spirituality | James Clarke & Co | 2025 | | |
| Forgiveness, Reparation, and Remorse: Reckoning with Truthful Apology | Ethics Press International | 2025 | ISBN 9781804418574 | |
| The Crisis of Colonial Anglicanism: Empire, Slavery and Revolt in the Church of England | Hurst Publishing | 2025 | ISBN 9781911723585 | |
| The Precarious Church: Reforming the Body of Christ | SCM-Canterbury Press | 2023 | ISBN 9781119424345 | |
| The Spirit of Witness | SCM-Canterbury Press | 2023 | ISBN 9781786224453 | |
| An Advent Manifesto | BRF | 2023 | ISBN 9781800390942 | |
| Forty Psalms of Solace | Bloomsbury | 2023 | ISBN 9781399414111 | |
| Faiths Lost and Found: Understanding Apostasy | Darton, Longman & Todd | 2023 | ISBN 9781915412324 | |
| Others: A Very Short Book About Beliefs | John Hunt Publishing | 2022 | ISBN 978-1119424383 | |
| The Blackwell Companion to Religion and Peace | Blackwell | 2022 | ISBN 978-1803410685 | |
| The Humble Church: Renewing the Body of Christ | SCM-Canterbury Press | 2021 | ISBN 978-1786223159 | |
| The SPCK Handbook of the Study of Ministry | SPCK | 2019 | ISBN 9780281081363 | Edited with Ian Markham, Emma Percy and Francesca Po |
| Reasonable Radical?: Reading the Writings of Martyn Percy | Pickwick Publications | 2018 | ISBN 9781532617836 | Edited by Ian Markham and Joshua Daniel |
| Untamed Gospel: Poems, Prose and Protests | Canterbury Press | 2017 | ISBN 9781848259904 | Co-authored with Nigel Biggar, Jamie Coates, Jim Cotter, Sarah Foot, Carol Harrison, Sylvia Sands and Graham Ward |
| Clergy, Culture and Ministry The dynamics of Roles and Relations in Church and Society | SCM Press | 2017 | ISBN 9780334056188 | Editor |
| The Future Shapes of Anglicanism: Currents, Contours, Charts | Routledge | 2017 | ISBN 9781472477170 | |
| The Oxford Handbook of Anglican Studies | Oxford University Press | 2015 | ISBN 9780199218561 | Edited with Mark Chapman and Sathianathan Clarke |
| Curacies and How to Survive Them | SPCK | 2015 | ISBN 9780281073436 | Co-authored with Matthew Caminer and Beaumont Stevenson |
| The Wisdom of the Spirit: Gospel, Church and Culture | Routledge | 2014 | ISBN 9781472435651 | Edited with Pete Ward |
| The Bright Field: Meditations and Reflections for Ordinary Time | Canterbury Press | 2014 | ISBN 9781848256125 | Editor |
| Anglicanism: Confidence, Commitment and Communion | Routledge | 2013 | ISBN 9781409470366 | |
| Thirty Nine New Articles: An Anglican Landscape of Faith | Canterbury Press | 2013 | ISBN 9781848255258 | |
| The Ecclesial Canopy: Faith, Hope, Charity (Explorations in Practical, Pastoral and Empirical Theology) | Routledge | 2012 | ISBN 9781409441205 | |
| A Point of Balance: The Weight and Measure of Anglicanism | Canterbury Press | 2011 | ISBN 9780819228444 | Edited with Robert Slocum |
| Shaping the Church: The Promise of Implicit Theology | Routledge | 2010 | ISBN 9780754666059 | |
| Apostolic Women, Apostolic Authority | Canterbury Press | 2010 | ISBN 9780819224507 | Edited with Christina Rees |
| Christ and Culture: Communion After Lambeth | Canterbury Press | 2010 | ISBN 9780819227980 | Editor |
| Evaluating Fresh Expressions | Canterbury Press | 2008 | ISBN 9781853118166 | Edited with Louise Nelstrop |
| Darkness Yielding: Liturgies, Prayers and Reflections for Advent, Christmas, Lent, Holy Week and Easter | Canterbury Press | 2007 | ISBN 9781853118449 | Co-authored with Jim Cotter, Sylvia Sands, William Hubert Vanstone and Rowan Williams |
| Clergy: The Origin of Species | Continuum International | 2006 | ISBN 9780826482877 | |
| Why Liberal Churches are Growing | T&T Clark | 2006 | ISBN 9780567081636 | Edited with Ian Markham |
| Engaging with Contemporary Culture: Christianity, Theology and the Concrete Church | Routledge | 2005 | ISBN 9780754632597 | |
| The Character of Wisdom: Essays in Honour of Wesley Carr | Routledge | 2004 | ISBN 0754634183 | Edited with Stephen Lowe |
| Fundamentalism, Church and Society | SPCK | 2002 | ISBN 0281051887 | Edited with Ian Jones |
| The Salt of the Earth: Religious Resilience in a Secular Age | Continuum International | 2001 | ISBN 9781841270654 | Re-published in Bloomsbury Academic Collection (2016) |
| Restoring the Image: Essays in Honour of David Martin | Sheffield Academic Press | 2001 | ISBN 1841270644 | Edited with Andrew Walker |
| Previous Convictions: Conversion in the Present Day | SPCK | 2000 | ISBN 0281051801 | Editor |
| Managing the Church? Order and Organisation in a Secular Age | Sheffield Academic Press | 2000 | ISBN 1841270628 | Edited with Gillian Evans |
| Calling Time: Religion and Change at the Turn of the Millennium | Sheffield Academic Press | 2000 | ISBN 1841270636 | Editor; re-published in Bloomsbury Academic Collection (2016) |
| Intimate Affairs: Sexuality and Spirituality in Perspective | Darton, Longman & Todd | 1997 | ISBN 0232522073 | Editor |
| Power and the Church: Ecclesiology in an Age of Transition | Cassell | 1997 | ISBN 9781441113580 | |
| Words, Wonders and Power: Understanding Contemporary Christian Fundamentalism and Revivalism | SPCK | 1996 | ISBN 9780281048557 | |

=== Key essays in edited books ===
| Title | Publisher | Year | ISBN | Notes |
|---|---|---|---|---|
| 'Religion, Mobilisation and Power' in The International Encyclopaedia of Social and Behavioural Sciences, Vol. 19 | Elsevier | 2001 | ISBN 9780080430768 | |
| 'Whose Time is it Anyway? Evangelicals, the Millennium and Millenarianism' in Christian Millenarianism | Indiana University Press | 2001 | ISBN 9780253340139 | Edited by Stephen Hunt |
| 'Falling Far Short: Taking Sin Seriously' in Reinhold Niebuhr and Contemporary Politics | Oxford University Press | 2010 | ISBN 9780199571833 | Edited by Richard Harries and Stephen Platten |
| 'The Future of Religion' in the Oxford Textbook of Spirituality in Healthcare | Oxford University Press | 2012 | ISBN 9780199571390 | Co-authored with Grace Davie, Edited by Mark R Cobb, Christina M Puchalski, and Bruce Rumbold |
| 'Jazz and Anglican Spirituality' in Christian Congregational Music: Performance, Identity, Experience | Routledge | 2013 | ISBN 9781409466024 | Edited by Monique Ingalls, Carolyn Landau & Tom Wagner |
| 'The Anatomy of Fundamentalism' in Fundamentalisms: Threats and Ideologies in the Modern World | I.B.Tauris | 2015 | ISBN 9781780769509 | Edited by James Dunn |
| 'Protestantism' in The Handbook of Christian Movements | Brill | 2015 | ISBN 9789004265394 | Edited by Stephan Hunt |
| 'Class, Ethnicity and Education: Leadership, Congregations and the Sociology of Anglicanism' in The Oxford History of Anglicanism, Volume IV: Global Western Anglicanism, c. 1910–present | Oxford University Press | 2017 | ISBN 9780199641406 | Edited by Jeremy Morris |
| 'The Household of Faith: Anglican Obliquity and the Lambeth Conference' in The Lambeth Conference and the Anglican Communion | Bloomsbury | 2017 | ISBN 9780567662316 | Edited by Paul Avis and Benjamin Guyer |
| 'Mood, Identity and Character in Anglican Congregations' in Theologically-Engaged Anthropology | Oxford University Press | 2018 | ISBN 9780198797852 | Edited by J.Derrick Lemons |
| 'A Critical Theology of Megachurches' in Handbook of Megachurches | Brill | 2019 | ISBN 9789004399884 | Edited by Stephen Hunt |
| 'Christmas in the Anglican Tradition' in The Oxford Handbook of Christmas | Oxford University Press | 2020 | ISBN 9780198831464 | Edited by Timothy Larsen |
| 'Bread and Honey: Social Flourishing and the Economics of Mutuality' in Putting Purpose into Practice: The Economics of Mutuality | Oxford University Press | 2021 | ISBN 9780198870708 | Edited by Colin Meyer & Bruno Roche |
| "'The Myth of Impartiality: Moral Questioning in the BBC and the Church of England'" CRUCIBLE | SCM | 2022 | ISBN | Edited by Angela Tilby |
| 'Crown, Constitution and Church: A Crisis for English Religion'" PROSPECT | London | 2022 | ISBN | Edited by Alan Rusbridger |
| Moods, Memes, Mood and Music: Understanding Ecclesiology | Oxford University Press | 2023 | ISBN | Edited by Steve Guthrie & Bennett Zon |

== See also ==
- Oxford Centre for Ecclesiology and Practical Theology

Church of England titles
| Preceded by Christopher Lewis | Dean of Christ Church; 2014–2022 | to be announced |
Academic offices
| Preceded by John Clarke | Principal of Ripon College Cuddesdon; 2004–2014 | Succeeded by Humphrey Southern |
Other offices
| Preceded by Alan Wilkinson | Scott Holland Memorial Lecturer; 2002; With: Jolyon Mitchell | Succeeded by Michael Nazir-Ali |
