= Oxford Centre for Ecclesiology and Practical Theology =

Coordinates: 51°43′29″N 1°08′02″W

The Oxford Centre for Ecclesiology and Practical Theology (OxCEPT) is a research centre based at Ripon College Cuddesdon.

== Overview ==
OxCEPT was founded in May 2006 by the Principal, Martyn Percy as a research-led and consultancy body to work with the church, developing ecclesiology and practical theology that enables the church to develop its polity and praxis for mission and ministry. The Centre initially worked through appointing Research Fellows who were funded by external grants. Initial funded research projects included a detailed ethnographic survey of a midlands diocese in the Church of England, exploring the dynamics of mission and ministry; and a fully-funded evaluation of the ‘Fresh Expressions’ movement.

The centre's first full-time director was Dr Helen Cameron, appointed in 2007. The post was funded by a supporter and benefactor, who shared the vision of the centre. Dr Cameron subsequently shaped the centre as a focussed and dedicated research and consultancy body that sought to ‘think with the church’. The centre now has a vision for developing the life and mission of the church by attending to God's work in the world in order to develop faithful and reflective practice. People connect with the centre to collaborate and engage in strategic thinking, to develop resources, to do research – all with the aim of transforming practice.

Dr Cameron was succeeded as director by the Rt. Revd. Professor Stephen Pickard (interim director, 2011). The current director is the renowned missiologist, Dr Cathy Ross, originally from New Zealand. The Patrons of OxCEPT are The Rt. Revd John Pritchard, Bishop of Oxford and Dr Paula Gooder.

Since its foundation in 2006, OxCEPT has generated over half a million GBP for research-led and consultancy-based initiatives with the churches. OxCEPT's approach is through praxis-based research, offering consultancy and producing publications. It aims to enable networking between parishes, dioceses, mission agencies and other faith-based organisations. It is intentionally ecumenical. In addition to the specific research at the local and national level, OxCEPT is part of the wider research culture of Ripon College Cuddesdon, where there is a particular expertise in mission, ecclesiology, ecumenism, Anglicanism, and Biblical hermeneutics.

Notable work undertaken by OxCEPT has included several research projects, including the report on Fresh Expressions commissioned by the Church Urban Fund which particularly focused on emerging forms of church in deprived communities. ARCS (Action Research in Church and Society) was jointly pioneered by OxCEPT and Heythrop College (University of London), one outcome of which was the ‘Living Church in the Global City’ report which investigated the mission outreach of the church and church-related groups. ‘Sustaining Leaders in Mission and Change’ was a significant report into the ministry and resourcing of Archdeacons in the Church of England. There has also been significant research into the spirituality of older people. OxCEPT also has a specialist interest in researching and resourcing chaplaincy practice, in all its manifestations, as well as highlighting its role in the church today. It also has a specialist interest in world Christianity and its significance for the church today.

There are several strands to OxCEPT's work besides the research that serves both the contemporary church and the academic sphere. It also aims to foster a vibrant learning and research community among the students at Ripon College Cuddesdon during their time in training and beyond.

Consultancy work is also undertaken for churches, denominations, dioceses and mission agencies. This is usually a process by which a range of experts and some skilled researchers assist an individual, group or organisation to analyse and reflect upon their work. OxCEPT provides consultancy services and support to enable the church to reflect on practice.

OxCEPT also helps with the professional development and continuing ministerial development of clergy, by fostering research capacity through offering sabbaticals, seminars and educational events. OxCEPT hosts regular public seminars at Ripon College Cuddesdon on issues of interest to students in training and the wider church. Theological Reflection (TR) is at the core of all OxCEPT's research methods. This comprises a range of methods for investigating and supporting groups as they articulate their espoused theology, and compare it with their operant theology. This is currently being developed under the name of Theological Action Research (TAR).
