= Lincoln Theological Institute for the Study of Religion and Society =

English research centre

The Lincoln Theological Institute for the Study of Religion and Society, simply known as the Lincoln Theological Institute, is a research centre at the University of Manchester. Established in 1997, its research focuses on theology, faith and society.

== History ==
Founded in 1997 as the successor body to Lincoln Theological College, the Lincoln Theological Institute was initially located at the University of Sheffield. In 2003, the Lincoln Theological Institute moved to the Department of Religions and Theology at the University of Manchester. The Institute's first director, appointed in 1997, was Martyn Percy. He left in 2004 to become Principal at Ripon College Cuddesdon. He was succeeded in 2005 by Peter Manley Scott, who joined from the University of Gloucestershire.

The Lincoln Theological Institute charity (chaired by Rt Revd Stephen Platten, Bishop of Wakefield), funds the research activities of the Institute. It owns Chad Varah House on Drury Lane, Lincoln, the building occupied by Lincoln Theological College until it closed in 1995.

== Staff ==
- Martyn Percy, director, 1997-2004
- Peter Manley Scott, director, 2005–present
- Ian Jones, 2000-2007
- Stefan Skrimshire, 2007-2010
- Susannah Cornwall, 2011-2013

The Lincoln Theological Institute also has a number of affiliated honorary research fellows and doctoral students.

== Research projects ==
The Lincoln Theological Institute's research has taken place across a number of projects focusing on themes including place, location, habitation and ecology; global threats and powers; religion and civil society; technology, limits and transformation; power and institutions (including the Church); liberation, political, ecological and public theologies; and culture - including religious cultures - and sources of hope.

Major projects have included:

- Women and Ordination
- Hospital Chaplaincy
- Divinity After Empire
- Future Ethics: Climate Change, Political Action and the Future of the Human
- Remoralizing Britain
- Belonging and Heimat
- Systematic Theology for a Changing Climate
- The Common Good
- A Shaking of the Foundations? Reconsidering Civil Society
- Intersex, Identity, Disability: Issues for Public Policy, Healthcare and the Church

== Publications ==
- Hospital Chaplaincy: Modern, Dependable?, Helen Orchard, Sheffield Academic Press, 2000
- Women and Priesthood in the Church of England: Ten Years On, Ian Jones, Church House Publishing, 2004
- Women and Ordination in the Christian Churches: International Perspectives, Ian Jones, Janet Wootton and Kirsty Thorpe (eds.), T&T Clark, 2008
- Remoralizing Britain, Peter Scott, Chris Baker and Elaine Graham (eds.), Continuum, 2009
- Future Ethics: Climate Change and Apocalyptic Imagination, Stefan Skrimshire (ed.), Continuum, 2010
- Beyond the Tipping Point? (documentary), dir. Stefan Skrimshire, 2010
- Decolonizing the Body of Christ: Theology and Theory After Empire?, David Joy and Joseph Duggan (eds.), Palgrave Macmillan, 2012
- At Home in the Future: Place and Belonging in a Changing Europe, John Rodwell and Peter Scott (eds.), LIT Verlag, 2013
- Systematic Theology and Climate Change, Peter Scott and Michael Northcott (eds.), Routledge, 2014
- Intersex, Theology and the Bible: Troubling Bodies in Church, Text and Society, Susannah Cornwall (ed.), Palgrave Macmillan, 2015
