= Ian Markham =

Episcopal priest and dean of Virginia Theological Seminary

The Very Reverend Ian Markham
- Born: September 19, 1962 (age 64)
- Office: Dean and President of Virginia Theological Seminary
- Spouse: Lesley Markham (m. 1987)

Ecclesiastical career
- Religion: Christianity (Anglican)
- Church: Episcopal Church (United States)
- Ordained: 2007 (deacon); 2007 (priest)

Academic background
- Education: University of London; University of Cambridge; University of Exeter
- Thesis: Plurality, Truth and Christian Ethics (1994)

Academic work
- Discipline: Theology
- Institutions: University of Exeter; Liverpool Hope University College; Hartford Seminary; Virginia Theological Seminary

Ian Stephen Markham (born 1962) is an Episcopal priest and the dean and president of Virginia Theological Seminary (VTS) since August 2007. Previously, he served at Hartford Seminary in Connecticut as dean and Professor of Theology and Ethics.

== Education and academic career ==
Markham obtained a Bachelor of Divinity degree in theology at the University of London and a Master of Letters degree in philosophy and ethics at the University of Cambridge. He finished his Doctor of Philosophy degree at the University of Exeter, focusing on Christian ethics.

He started the position of dean and president of VTS in August 2007. On February 5, 2026, Markham announced his intention to retire at the end of the 2027-28 academic year.

== Personal life ==
He is married to Lesley Markham and has one son, Luke.

== Published works ==
=== Books authored ===
- Plurality and Christian Ethics. New Studies in Christian Ethics. Vol. 4. Cambridge, England: Cambridge University Press. 1994. ISBN 978-0-521-45328-8.
- The Godparents' Handbook. With Legood, Giles. London: SPCK. 1997. ISBN 978-0-281-05054-3.
- Truth and the Reality of God: An Essay in Natural Theology. Edinburgh: T&T Clark. 1998. ISBN 978-0-567-08618-1.
- The Church Wedding Handbook. With Legood, Giles. London: SPCK. 2000. ISBN 978-0-281-05269-1.
- The Funeral Handbook. With Legood, Giles. London: SPCK. 2003. ISBN 978-0-281-05413-8.
- A Theology of Engagement. Malden, Massachusetts: Blackwell Publishing. 2003. ISBN 978-0-631-23601-6.
- Do Morals Matter? A Guide to Contemporary Religious Ethics. Malden, Massachusetts: Blackwell Publishing. 2007. ISBN 978-1-4051-5378-2.
- Understanding Christian Doctrine. Malden, Massachusetts: Blackwell Publishing. 2007. ISBN 978-1-4051-3152-0.
- Engaging with Bediuzzaman Said Nursi: A Model of Interfaith Dialogue. Farnham, England: Ashgate Publishing. 2009. ISBN 978-0-7546-6931-9.
- Liturgical Life Principles: How Episcopal Worship Can Lead to Healthy and Authentic Living. New York: Morehouse Publishing. 2009. ISBN 978-0-8192-2324-1.
- Against Atheism: Why Dawkins, Hitchens, and Harris Are Fundamentally Wrong. Malden, Massachusetts: Wiley-Blackwell. 2010. ISBN 978-1-4051-8964-4.
- An Introduction to Said Nursi: Life, Thought, and Writings. With Pirim, Suendam Birinci. Farnham, England: Ashgate Publishing. 2011. ISBN 978-1-4094-0769-0.
- Episcopal Questions, Episcopal Answers: Exploring Christian Faith. With Robertson, C. K. New York: Morehouse Publishing. 2014. ISBN 978-0-8192-2309-8.

=== Books edited ===
- A World Religions Reader. Editor. Oxford: Basil Blackwell. 1996. ISBN 978-0-631-18242-9.
- The Middle Way: Theology, Politics and Economics in the Later Thought of R.H. Preston. Edited with Elford, R. John. London: SCM Press. 2000. ISBN 978-0-334-02793-5.
- Theological Liberalism: Creative and Critical. Edited with Jobling, J'annine. London: SPCK. 2000. ISBN 978-0-281-05361-2.
- Encountering Religion: An Introduction to the Religions of the World. Edited with Ruparell, Tinu. Malden, Massachusetts: Blackwell Publishing. 2001. ISBN 978-0-631-20674-3.
- September 11: Religious Perspectives on the Causes and Consequences. Edited with Abu-Rabi‘, Ibrahim M. Oxford: Oneworld. 2003. ISBN 978-1-85168-308-6.
- Globalization, Ethics and Islam: The Case of Bediuzzaman Said Nursi. Edited with Özdemir, İbrahim. Burlington, Vermont: Ashgate Publishing. 2005. ISBN 978-0-7546-5015-7.
- Why Liberal Churches Are Growing. Edited with Percy, Martyn. London: T&T Clark. 2006. ISBN 978-0-567-08163-6.
- The Student's Companion to the Theologians. Editor. Oxford: Wiley-Blackwell. 2013. doi:10.1002/9781118427170. ISBN 978-1-118-47258-3.
- The Wiley-Blackwell Companion to the Anglican Communion. Edited with Hawkins, J. Barney, IV; Terry, Justyn; Steffensen, Leslie Nuñez. Oxford: Wiley-Blackwell. 2013. doi:10.1002/9781118320815. ISBN 978-0-470-65634-1.

=== Book chapters ===
- "The Liberal Tradition and Its Conservative Successors". In Jobling, J'annine; Markham, Ian. Theological Liberalism: Creative and Critical. London: SPCK. 2000. pp. 1–14. ISBN 978-0-281-05361-2.
- "Ronald Preston and the Contemporary Ethical Scene". In Markham, Ian S.; Elford, R. John. The Middle Way: Theology, Politics and Economics in the Later Thought of R.H. Preston. London: SCM Press. 2000. pp. 257–265. ISBN 978-0-334-02793-5.
- "Structures for Theological Conversation". With Ledbetter, Shannon. In Jobling, J'annine; Markham, Ian. Theological Liberalism: Creative and Critical. London: SPCK. 2000. pp. 142–154. ISBN 978-0-281-05361-2.
- "Shintoism". In Markham, Ian S.; Ruparell, Tinu. Encountering Religion: An Introduction to the Religions of the World. Malden, Massachusetts: Blackwell Publishing. 2001. ISBN 978-0-631-20674-3.
- "9.11: Contrasting Reactions and the Challenge of Dialogue". In Markham, Ian; Abu-Rabi‘, Ibrahim M. September 11: Religious Perspectives on the Causes and Consequences. Oxford: Oneworld. 2003. pp. 206ff. ISBN 978-1-85168-308-6.
- "Religious or Secular: The Ethics of Said Nursi". In Markham, Ian; Özdemir, İbrahim. Globalization, Ethics and Islam: The Case of Bediuzzaman Said Nursi. Burlington, Vermont: Ashgate Publishing. 2005. ISBN 978-0-7546-5015-7.
- "Rethinking Globalization: Bediuzzaman Said Nursi's Risale-I Nur in Conversation with Empire by Hardt and Negri". In Markham, Ian; Özdemir, İbrahim. Globalization, Ethics and Islam: The Case of Bediuzzaman Said Nursi. Burlington, Vermont: Ashgate Publishing. 2005. ISBN 978-0-7546-5015-7.
- "Two Conditions for a Growing Liberal Church: Right Theology and Right Clergy". In Percy, Martyn; Markham, Ian. Why Liberal Churches Are Growing. London: T&T Clark. 2006. pp. 160–166. ISBN 978-0-567-08163-6.
- "The Anglican Church of Southern Africa". In Markham, Ian S.; Hawkins, J. Barney, IV; Terry, Justyn; Steffensen, Leslie Nuñez. The Wiley-Blackwell Companion to the Anglican Communion. Oxford: Wiley-Blackwell. 2013. pp. 194–198. doi:10.1002/9781118320815.ch17. ISBN 978-0-470-65634-1.
- "B. B. Warfield (1851–1921)". In Markham, Ian S. The Student's Companion to the Theologians. Oxford: Wiley-Blackwell. 2013. pp. 350–352. doi:10.1002/9781118427170.ch47. ISBN 978-1-118-47258-3.
- "Black Theology". In Markham, Ian S. The Student's Companion to the Theologians. Oxford: Wiley-Blackwell. 2013. pp. 371–377. doi:10.1002/9781118427170.ch50. ISBN 978-1-118-47258-3.
- "The Church of South India (United)". In Markham, Ian S.; Hawkins, J. Barney, IV; Terry, Justyn; Steffensen, Leslie Nuñez. The Wiley-Blackwell Companion to the Anglican Communion. Oxford: Wiley-Blackwell. 2013. pp. 355–358. doi:10.1002/9781118320815.ch32. ISBN 978-0-470-65634-1.
- "Friedrich Daniel Ernst Schleiermacher (1768–1834)". In Markham, Ian S. The Student's Companion to the Theologians. Oxford: Wiley-Blackwell. 2013. pp. 320–325. doi:10.1002/9781118427170.ch44. ISBN 978-1-118-47258-3.
- "Gustavo Gutiérrez (1928– )". In Markham, Ian S. The Student's Companion to the Theologians. Oxford: Wiley-Blackwell. 2013. pp. 402–405. doi:10.1002/9781118427170.ch56. ISBN 978-1-118-47258-3.
- "Interreligious Relations in the Anglican Communion". In Markham, Ian S.; Hawkins, J. Barney, IV; Terry, Justyn; Steffensen, Leslie Nuñez. The Wiley-Blackwell Companion to the Anglican Communion. Oxford: Wiley-Blackwell. 2013. pp. 657–665. doi:10.1002/9781118320815.ch59. ISBN 978-0-470-65634-1.
- "James Packer (1926– )". In Markham, Ian S. The Student's Companion to the Theologians. Oxford: Wiley-Blackwell. 2013. pp. 475–477. doi:10.1002/9781118427170.ch67. ISBN 978-1-118-47258-3.
- "John Nelson Darby (1800–1882)". In Markham, Ian S. The Student's Companion to the Theologians. Oxford: Wiley-Blackwell. 2013. pp. 262–264. doi:10.1002/9781118427170.ch36. ISBN 978-1-118-47258-3.
- "Keith Ward (1938– )". In Markham, Ian S. The Student's Companion to the Theologians. Oxford: Wiley-Blackwell. 2013. pp. 541–545. doi:10.1002/9781118427170.ch77. ISBN 978-1-118-47258-3.

== See also ==
- List of Virginia Theological Seminary people
