= Robert Wilson (priest, born 1840) =

English Anglican priest and academic

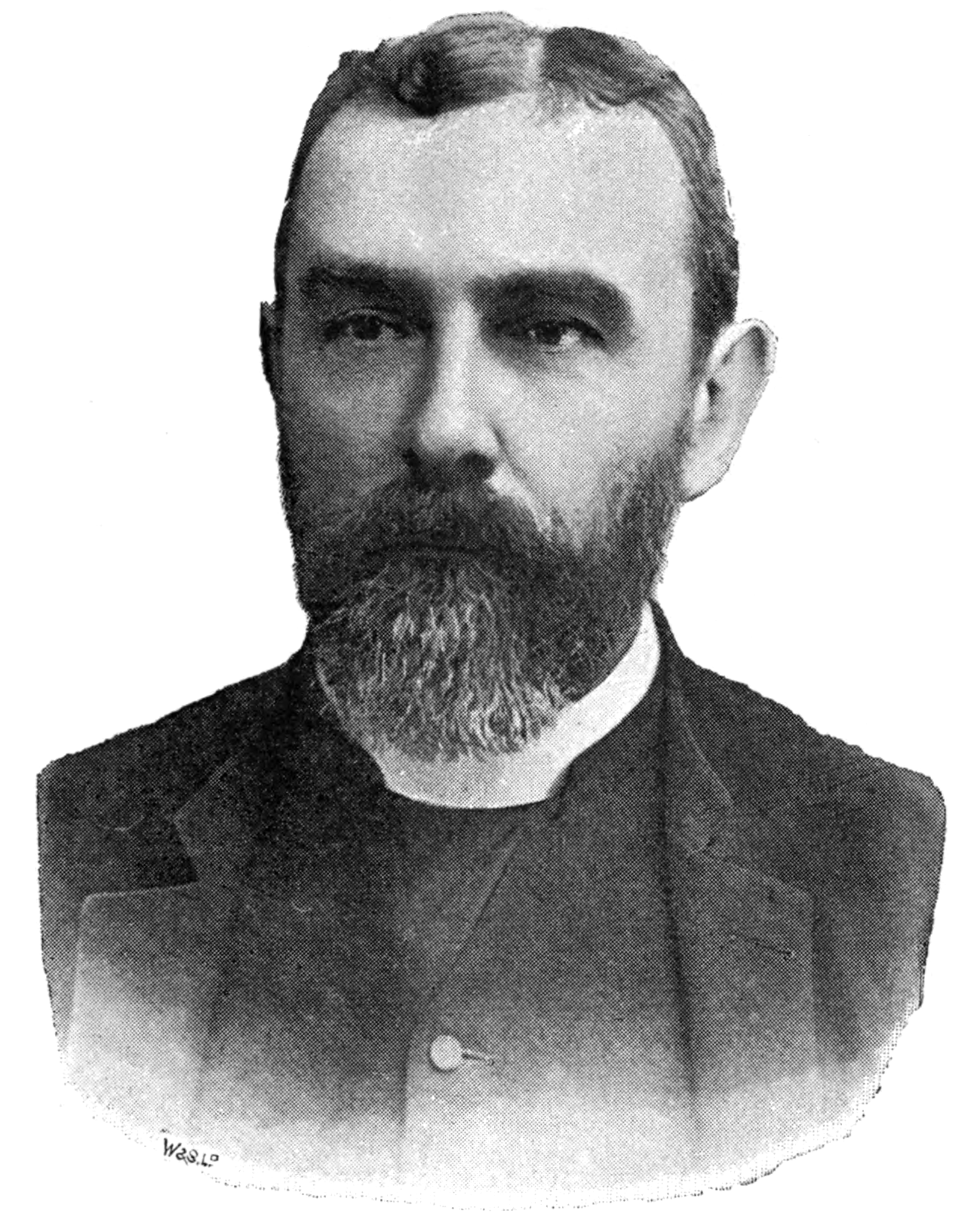
Robert Wilson

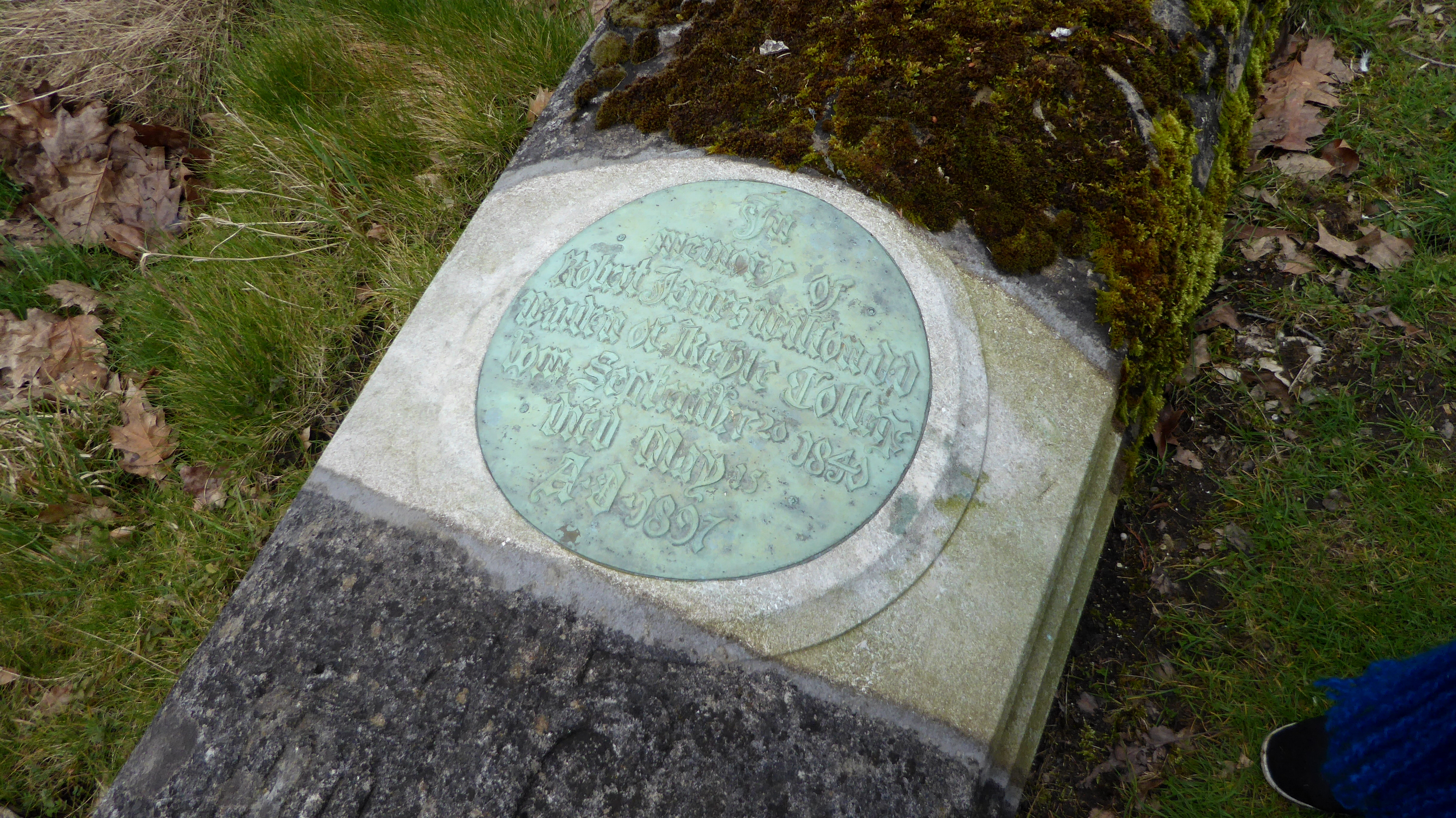
Wilson's grave in Holywell Cemetery, Oxford

Robert James Wilson (20 September 1840 – 15 May 1897) was an English Anglican priest and academic, who was Warden of Keble College, Oxford, from 1889 until his death.

Wilson was born in Broadwater, Sussex, England and educated at Cheltenham College and Merton College, Oxford. He was appointed as a Fellow of the college in 1867, retaining this position until 1889. He was ordained in the Church of England in 1868, and served as vicar of Wolvercote, Oxfordshire, from 1875 to 1879, when he became Warden of Radley College (until 1888); he was also vicar of Radley from 1880 to 1893. In 1889, he was appointed Warden of Keble College, Oxford, and made an Honorary Fellow of Merton. Wilson was a member of the Society of the Holy Cross, an Anglo-Catholic priestly Congregation. A leading defender of ritualism, Wilson was in conflict with the ecclesiastical authorities of his day. He publicly opposed the Public Worship Regulation Act 1874. In the same year, he wrote to Archibald Campbell Tait, the Archbishop of Canterbury, defending the use of altar cards. Subsequent to the death of H.P. Liddon in 1890, Wilson and J.O. Johnston were entrusted, the latter being one of Liddon's literary executors, with the editing and publication of his Life of E.B. Pusey.

He died on 15 May 1897.

== Works ==
- The Catholic Church and the Church of Rome: A Letter (1872)
- Misconceptions of 'ritualist' teaching: or, 'Are we unfaithful?' A reply to 2 sermons preached by J.W. Burgon (1873)
- An earnest protest against some of the statements of His Grace the Lord Archbishop of Canterbury, made by him, on introduction the Public Worship Regulations Bill (1874)
- Correspondence on the Subject of Altar Cards, between His Grace the Archbishop of Canterbury and the Rev. R.J. Wilson (1874)
- An earnest protest against some of the statements of His Grace the Lord Archbishop of Canterbury, made by him, on introduction the Public Worship Regulations Bill (1874)
- Our relation to the saints: some notes gathered from English divines (1874)
- Keble and the revival of religion. A sermon. (1891)
- Thoughts on Confirmation (1898)
- Before the Altar: The Devout Christian's Manual (1910)
