= Peter Manley Scott =

British theologian

- Born: 1961 (age 64–65)

Education
- Education: University of Bristol
- Thesis: An Epistemology for Liberation (1990)

Philosophical work
- Era: 21st-century philosophy
- Region: Western philosophy
- School: Christian theology
- Institutions: University of Manchester; University of Gloucestershire
- Main interests: Political philosophy

Peter Manley Scott (born 1961) is a British theologian and Samuel Ferguson Professor of Applied Theology & Director of the Lincoln Theological Institute at the University of Manchester. He is best known for his research on political theology. Scott is the Chair of the European Forum for the Study of Religion and the Environment.

== Books ==
- Theology, Ideology and Liberation, Cambridge University Press, 1994
- A Political Theology of Nature, Cambridge University Press, 2003
- Anti-human Theology: Nature, Technology and the Postnatural, SCM, 2010
- A Theology of Postnatural Right, LIT Verlag, 2019
- Blackwell Companion to Political Theology (ed.), 2004, 2nd edition 2019
