= Ripon College Cuddesdon =

Church of England theological college in Cuddesdon

Coordinates: 51°43′29″N 1°08′02″W

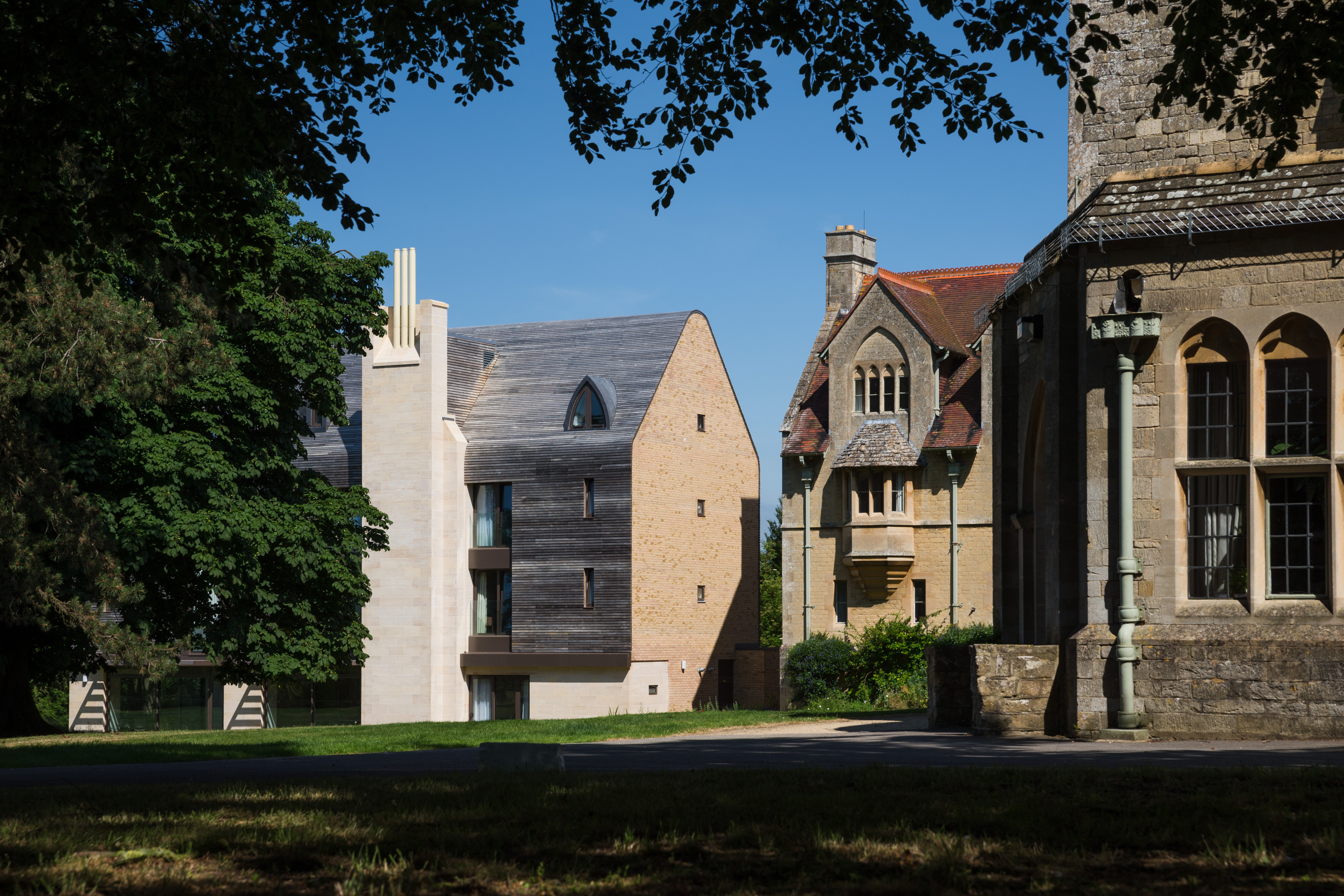
- College grounds
- Former names: Oxford Diocesan Seminary at Cuddesdon; Cuddesdon College; Ripon Clergy College
- Type: Theological college
- Established: 1853 (Cuddesdon College); 1897/1898 (Ripon Hall); 1974 (Ripon College Cuddesdon)
- Founder: Samuel Wilberforce
- Religious affiliation: Church of England, Diocese of Oxford
- Principal: Harriet Harris
- Location: Cuddesdon, England
- Building details

General information
- Architectural style: English Gothic Revival

Design and construction
- Architect: G. E. Street
- Designations: Grade II listed

Ripon College Cuddesdon (RCC) is a Church of England theological college in Cuddesdon, a village 5.5 miles (8.9 km) outside Oxford, England. The College trains men and women for ministry in the Church of England: stipendiary, non-stipendiary, local ordained and lay ministry, through a wide range of flexible full-time and part-time programmes.

== History ==
Ripon College Cuddesdon was formed from an amalgamation in 1975 of Cuddesdon College and Ripon Hall. The name of the college, which is incorporated by royal charter, deliberately contains no comma.

=== Cuddesdon College and links with Oxbridge ===
Samuel Wilberforce, Bishop of Oxford, founded Cuddesdon College in April 1853, as the Oxford Diocesan Seminary at Cuddesdon to train graduates from Oxford and Cambridge. Its original buildings, designed by the Diocesan Architect for Oxford G. E. Street, were built opposite the residence of the Bishop of Oxford, Cuddesdon Palace. The Neo-Gothic buildings are regarded as the first important design by Street and influenced much of his later work. The College opened in June 1854 and quickly became known as Cuddesdon College. A larger chapel, built at first-floor level and with decorations by Clayton and Bell, was added by Street in 1874–5. A small trapezoidal window installed high above the west gallery in 1964, depicting the Tree of Life, was designed for the chapel by John Piper and manufactured by Patrick Reyntiens. The northwest wing opposite the chapel, was built in 1904 by Spencer Slingsby Stallwood. The southeast wing in 1920 and the service wing in 1925. Traditionally, "Cuddesdon", as it is commonly known, was in the Anglo-Catholic – high church – tradition of the Church of England.

=== Ripon Hall ===
Ripon Hall was founded in Ripon, Yorkshire, in 1897 or 1898. It was originally a hostel for theological students, known as Bishop's College, founded by William Boyd Carpenter, Bishop of Ripon. In 1902, it was merged with Lightfoot Hall, Birmingham and became known as Ripon Clergy College. In 1919, the college moved from Ripon to a site in Parks Road in Oxford and was renamed Ripon Hall. There, it became known as a liberal Anglican college.

In 1933, Ripon Hall moved again, this time to a house then known as Berkeley House at Boars Hill, near Oxford, the former home of the 8th Earl of Berkeley. The college remained there until the merger with Cuddesdon in 1975, when the site, renamed Foxcombe Hall, became the regional headquarters of the Open University.

=== Ripon College Cuddesdon ===
The college incorporated the Oxford Ministry Course (OMC) in 2006 and the West of England Ministerial Training Course (WEMTC) in 2011, making it the largest provider of Anglican ordination training in the UK. The college partners the Diocese of Oxford in the delivery of Ordained Local Ministry training. In 2011 the college began a partnership with the Church Missionary Society to deliver training for Ordained Pioneer Ministers – the first partnership of this kind that pairs a theological college with a missionary society. In 2005, the Oxford Centre for Ecclesiology and Practical Theology (OxCEPT) was founded, which provides research and consultancy services to the wider church.

In 2010 the college launched a £10 million appeal to build a new education centre and chapel, as well as to raise funds for endowing bursaries, fellowships, studentships and research. The new Bishop Edward King Chapel and education centre (Harriet Monsell House) were completed and opened in 2013. The chapel – by architect Niall McLaughlin – has won many national and international awards for its design and building. Harriet Monsell House also included an enclosure for a community of five Anglican sisters who had moved from their base at Begbroke Priory. The sisters work alongside staff and students, supporting in prayer and spirituality, whilst continuing to develop their own ministries of spiritual direction.

Ripon College Cuddesdon became internationally more active during Martyn Percy's period as principal. It works closely with the Anglican Church in Hong Kong and continues to have links with Anglican colleges in the United States, Canada, South Africa, Australia and New Zealand. The college developed a programme of Christian–Muslim dialogue and related work, including a Visiting Fellowship for Islamic Scholars established at Cuddesdon in partnership with the Dubai-based Al Maktoum Institute.

=== Present ===
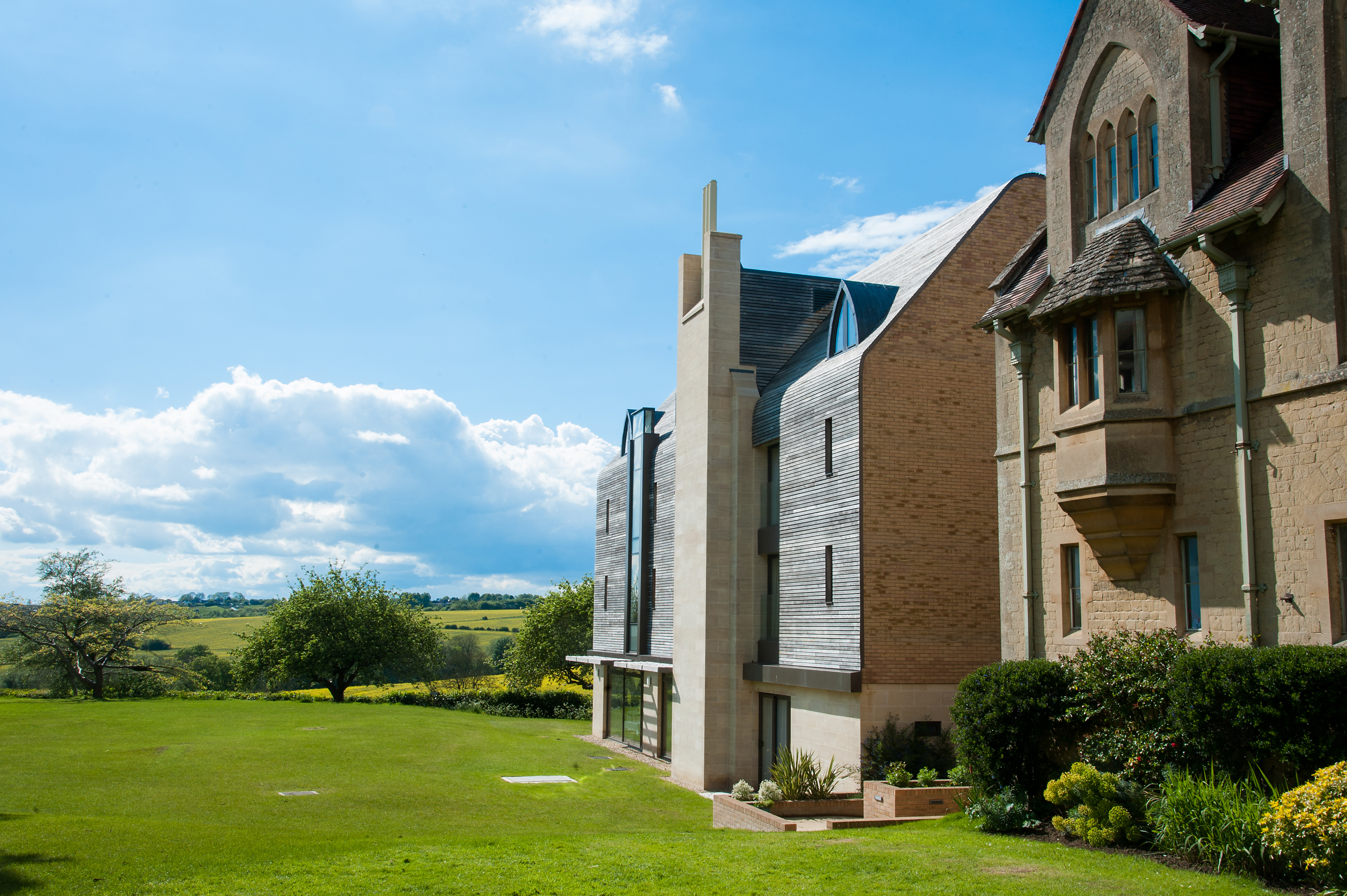
Harriet Monsell House at Ripon College Cuddesdon

Men and women with a range of previous experience, not necessarily graduates, take a two or three-year course of study incorporating pastoral and academic training. There are just over a dozen full-time students taking courses of study, either as matriculated students at Oxford University or on courses accredited by Durham University through the Church of England Common Awards Scheme which began in September 2014. Prior to this time, students not wishing to study at Oxford University were able to take courses of study accredited by Oxford Brookes University. With the introduction of the Common Awards Scheme, Cuddesdon streamlined its Oxford University offerings. Where previously the college had offered three courses, the Bachelor of Theology (BTh), the Certificate in Theology (CTh) and the Bachelor of Arts (BA) in Theology, the BTh and CTh are no longer offered and Cuddesdon students wishing to study at Oxford University must now take the BA or MTh. The college also has occasional PhD students.

Cuddesdon students come from across the spectrum of the Church of England but it retains a liturgical approach to worship and a broad approach to theology. It maintains a regular and disciplined approach to daily prayer and seeks to train students in a modern critical approach to the Christian tradition of the Church of England.

From 2008 the part-time Oxford Ministry Course, with about fifty ordinands, has been integrated into the college. The West of England Ministerial Training Course, which trains clergy and readers principally in the dioceses of Hereford and Gloucester was incorporated in 2011. This is now known as Cuddesdon Gloucester & Hereford and is headed up by the Revd Canon Dr Sarah Brush and the Revd Dr Alison Walker. Until recently the college also ran a Portsmouth Pathway (closed 2024) under the able leadership first of the Revd Dr James Grenfell and latterly the Revd Dr Richard Wyld.

The college has recently been awarded Innovation funding to establish courses to train Children's Youth and Families Ministers alongside the current ordinand and reader students. This begins with a pilot course in Gloucester and Ludlow from September 2024. In 2011 a new programme of training for pioneer ministers was set up in partnership with the Church Mission Society. The college has also hosted a research centre for practical theology, the Oxford Centre for Ecclesiology and Practical Theology (OxCEPT). It is a sponsor of the Society for the Study of Anglicanism.

In August 2014, two ordinands, Shemil Mathew (who later became an associate lecturer) and Joseph Fernandas, partnered with the support of the college to organize a significant conference titled "One Body, Many Parts." This landmark event marked the inception of the Anglican Minority Ethnic Network (AMEN). Since then, AMEN has flourished to become the Church of England's largest independent network of its kind, consisting of individuals from UK Minority Ethnic and Global Majority heritage. The network is dedicated to promoting inclusivity, representation, and active engagement of Minority Ethnic people at all levels within the church.

The principal, since 2026, has been Harriet Harris, former chaplain of the University of Edinburgh; the longstanding vice principal Mark Chapman, Dean of College and Reader in Modern Theology at the University of Oxford retired in September 2024 and the Revd Canon Dr Sarah Brush succeeded him as Vice Principal alongside her role as Director of Cuddesdon Gloucester and Hereford. The Revd Dr Richard Wyld is the Director of Formation, Dr Hywel Clifford teaches Old Testament and Hebrew; Dr Rebecca Dean is Tutor for Admissions and Lecturer in New Testament. In 2023 the staff were joined by new members the Revd Dr Buki Fatona, Dr Oliver Keenan, Dr Ellie McLaughlin, the Revd Dr Alison Walker and Dr Victoria Turner. Associate staff include the Revd Dr Joanna Collicutt, Prof. Prof. Anthony G. Reddie, The Revd Ray Gaston, Shemil Mathew, Dr Elaine Flowers, The Revd Steve Hollinghurst, Cate Williams and Dr Eddie Howells.

In 2012 the college became the new home of the Sisters of the Community of St John Baptist (CSJB) and the Community of the Companions of Jesus the Good Shepherd as part of a major building programme to provide more teaching and residential accommodation, named after Harriet Monsell, founder of CSJB, as well as a new chapel named in honour of Bishop Edward King, sometime principal of Cuddesdon. Since their departure to well-deserved retirement, Harriet Monsell House and the Clewer Room have been re-designated as a centre for retreats.

Since 2011, the College has hosted the biennial international "Christian Congregational Music: Local and Global Perspectives" conference, a gathering of scholars and practitioners across disciplines to discuss issues in contemporary congregational music. It also collaborates with the Bible Reading Fellowship for an annual Festival of Prayer

== Bishop Edward King Chapel ==
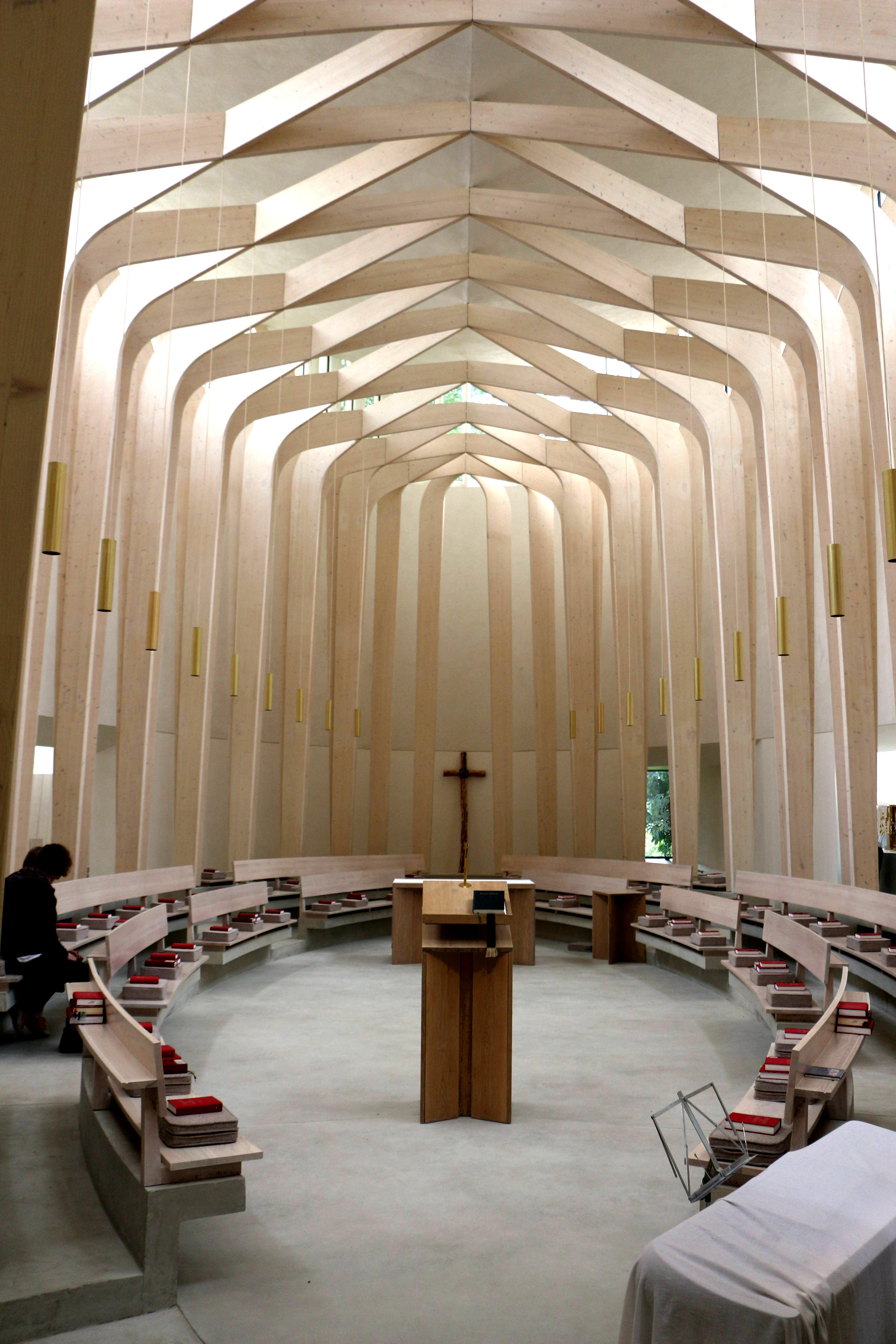
Bishop Edward King Chapel

The College is home to the Bishop Edward King Chapel. It is funded by the Sisters of the Communities of St John the Baptist and the Good Shepherd, who moved from Begbroke Priory to live in the College community. The 120 seat Chapel is elliptical in shape and its distinctive dog-tooth stone banding both complements the existing buildings in its material but remains very distinct in its form. The Chapel has a lattice-work timber frame which comprises curved laminated columns and beams to support a 13m high roof. It also features a series of clerestory windows, to the top of the walls, and floods the interior with light. The Chapel has won several awards, including:

- BCIA Small Building Project of the Year award in the British Construction Industry Awards.
- The structural award and the Gold Medal at the Wood Awards.
- Oxford Preservation Trust Award
- RIBA Award for South East

On 1 February 2013, the Bishop Edward King Chapel was dedicated by John Pritchard, Bishop of Oxford, at a celebration of the Eucharist for the Feast of the Presentation of Christ in the Temple. Michael Perham, Bishop of Gloucester, preached the sermon and Colin Fletcher, Bishop of Dorchester, assisted in the solemnities.

== List of principals ==
Ripon Hall

- John Battersby Harford (1902 to 1919)
- Henry Dewsbury Alves Major (1919 to 1947)
- Robert Douglas Richardson (1947 to 1952)
- Geoffrey Allen (1952 to 1959)
- Gordon Fallows (1959 to 1968)
- Anthony Dyson (1969 to 1975)

Cuddesdon Theological College

- Alfred Pott (1854 to 1859)
- H. H. Swinny, vicar of Wargrave (1859 to 1862)
- Edward King (1863 to 1873)
- Charles Wellington Furse (1873 to 1883)
- William Ducat (1883 to 1894)
- John Johnston (1895 to 1913)
- James Seaton (1914 to 1928)
- Eric Graham (1928 to 1944)
- Kenneth Riches (1945 to 1952)
- Edward Knapp-Fisher (1952 to 1960)
- Robert Runcie (1960 to 1970)
- Leslie Houlden (1970 to 1975)

Ripon College Cuddesdon

- Leslie Houlden (1975 to 1977)
- David Wilcox (1977 to 1986)
- John Garton (1986 to 1996)
- John Clarke (1996 to 2004)
- Martyn Percy (2004 to 2014)
- Humphrey Southern (2015 to 2025)
- Harriet Harris (2026 to present)

== Notable former staff ==
Among the college's previous staff members are:

- Edward King, later Bishop of Lincoln
- Henry Parry Liddon (vice-principal)
- Allan Webb (vice-principal 1864–1867), later Bishop of Bloemfontein and of Grahamstown, subsequently Dean of Salisbury.
- John Johnston (principal 1895–1913)
- Charles Gore, successively Bishop of Worcester, Birmingham and Oxford and Founder of the Community of the Resurrection, Mirfield.
- Robert Runcie, Archbishop of Canterbury: When Runcie retired from the archbishopric, he was created a life peer as Baron Runcie, of Cuddesdon in the County of Oxfordshire.
- John Clarke, Dean of Wells Cathedral.
- Paula Gooder, Tutor in Biblical Studies from 1995 to 2001.
- Helen-Ann Hartley lecturer in New Testament studies
- Charlotte Methuen, lecturer in church history

== Notable alumni ==
See also Category:Alumni of Ripon College Cuddesdon.

- Simon Aiken – Dean of Kimberley
- Walter Baddeley – Bishop of Melanesia, Whitby
- Roly Bain – clown-priest
- Timothy Bavin OSB – Bishop of Johannesburg, Bishop of Portsmouth and, later, monk of Alton Abbey.
- Chris Bryant – MP for Rhondda
- Richard Chartres – Bishop of London (1995–2017)
- Owen Chadwick – Vice-Chancellor of University of Cambridge, Master of Selwyn Cambridge, Regius Professor of Modern History, Dixie Professor of Ecclesiastical History, Chancellor of University of East Anglia, President of British Academy, Rugby Union International
- David Chillingworth Primus of the Scottish Episcipal Church
- Geoffrey Clayton – Archbishop of Cape Town
- Harold de Soysa – Anglican Bishop of Colombo
- John Delight – Archdeacon of Stoke (1982–1989)
- Philip Egerton – founder of Bloxham School
- Austin Farrer – Warden of Keble College, Oxford
- Nicholas Frayling – Dean of Chichester
- Cyril Garbett – Archbishop of York (1942–1955)
- John Hall – Dean of Westminster Abbey (2006–2019)
- David Hand – Archbishop of Papua New Guinea
- Richard Harries – Bishop of Oxford (1987–2005)
- John Hind – Bishop of Chichester
- Graham James – Bishop of Norwich (1999–2019)
- Keith Jones – Dean of York
- Cosmo Gordon Lang – Archbishop of York (1909–28), Archbishop of Canterbury (1928–1942)
- John Langdon, Royal Marine officer at D-Day, later became an Anglican priest
- Diarmaid MacCulloch – Professor of church history at the University of Oxford
- Michael Mayne – Dean of Westminster Abbey (1986–1996)
- Merivale Molyneux – Bishop of Melanesia
- John Packer – Bishop of Ripon and Leeds (2000–2014)
- Michael Perham – Bishop of Gloucester (2004–2014)
- Stephen Platten – Bishop of Wakefield
- Anthony Priddis – Bishop of Hereford (2004–2013)
- Michael Ramsey – Archbishop of Canterbury (1961–1974)
- Howard E. Root – Dean of Emmanuel College, Cambridge (1956–66), Professor of Theology, University of Southampton (1966–81) and Director of the Anglican Centre in Rome (1981–91)
- John Ruston – Bishop of St Helena (1957–1961)
- Michael Scott-Joynt – Bishop of Winchester (1995–2011)
- David Stancliffe – Bishop of Salisbury (1993–2010)
- Thomas Stanage – Bishop of Bloemfontein
- Tim Stevens – Bishop of Leicester (1999–2015)
- Nigel Stock – Bishop of Stockport (2000–2007), Bishop of St Edmundsbury & Ipswich (2007–2013), Bishop at Lambeth (2013–2017)
- Stephen Sykes – Bishop of Ely (1990–2000)
- Robert Willis – Dean of Canterbury
- David Hoyle – Dean of Bristol currently Dean of Westminster
- Andrew Swift – Bishop of Brechin
- Helen-Ann Hartley – Bishop of Newcastle (England)

== Sources and further reading ==
- Chapman, Mark D. (ed.), Ambassadors of Christ: Commemorating 150 Years of Theological Education in Cuddesdon 1854–2004, Burlington (Ashgate) 2004.
- Chapman, Mark D., God's Holy Hill: A History of Christianity in Cuddesdon, Charlbury (The Wychwood Press) 2004.
- Chisholm, Hugh, ed. (1911). "King, Edward" . Encyclopædia Britannica. Vol. 15 (11th ed.). Cambridge University Press. p. 803.
- Russell, George William Erskine (1912). Edward King, Sixtieth Bishop of Lincoln: A Memoir. London: Longman-Green.
