= Of the Five Wounds of the Holy Church =

1848 book by Antonio Rosmini

A cover of one edition of the book

Of the Five Wounds of the Holy Church is the English translation of the book Delle Cinque Piaghe della Santa Chiesa authored by Antonio Rosmini. It was translated, and prefaced by Henry Parry Liddon and published in London in 1883, and is now out of copyright. Blessed Antonio Rosmini-Serbati (March 25, 1797 - July 1, 1855) was troubled at what he perceived to be "wounds" of the Church and wrote this book to "relieve his own troubled mind, and possibly also to comfort others", near Padua in 1832.

== Premise ==
Of the Five Wounds of the Holy Church presupposes an analogy between the Holy Wounds suffered by the Lord's natural Body pierced on the cross, and His mystical body, the Church, pierced by the sins and errors of men in the ages of Christian history.

The five main evils of his contemporary Italian Church correspond, in Rosmini's view, to the five wounds of the hands, feet, and side of the Divine Redeemer. Beginning with the wound in Jesus' left hand, he likens it to the lack of sympathy between the clergy and people in the act of public worship, which he sees as a result of a lack of adequate Christian evangelical teaching. This is to be accounted for by the wound in the right hand — the insufficient education of the clergy, their secularisation and their alienation from scripture and their bishops. This again was both caused and perpetuated by the great wound in the side, which pierced the Heart of the Divine Sufferer, and which Rosmini sees as a parallel for the divisions among the Bishops, separating them from one another, and also from their clergy and people, forgetting their true union in the Body of Christ. The wound of the right foot is compared to the civil power of the Bishops making them into worldly schemers and politicians, more or less intent on selfish interests. The wound of the left foot is compared to events of the feudal period, when the freehold tenures of the Church were treated as fiefs by an overlord, or suzerain, who saw in the chief pastors of the flock of Christ only a particular variety of vassals or dependants.

== Objectives ==
According to the editor Liddon: "[Rosmini] longs for an intelligent union of the clergy and people in public worship, for a well-trained clergy, for an Episcopate united in heart and soul, for a restoration of the primitive method of electing Bishops, for the emancipation of Church property from trammels of feudal tenure."
