= Virginia Theological Seminary =

Episcopal seminary in Alexandria, Virginia, United States

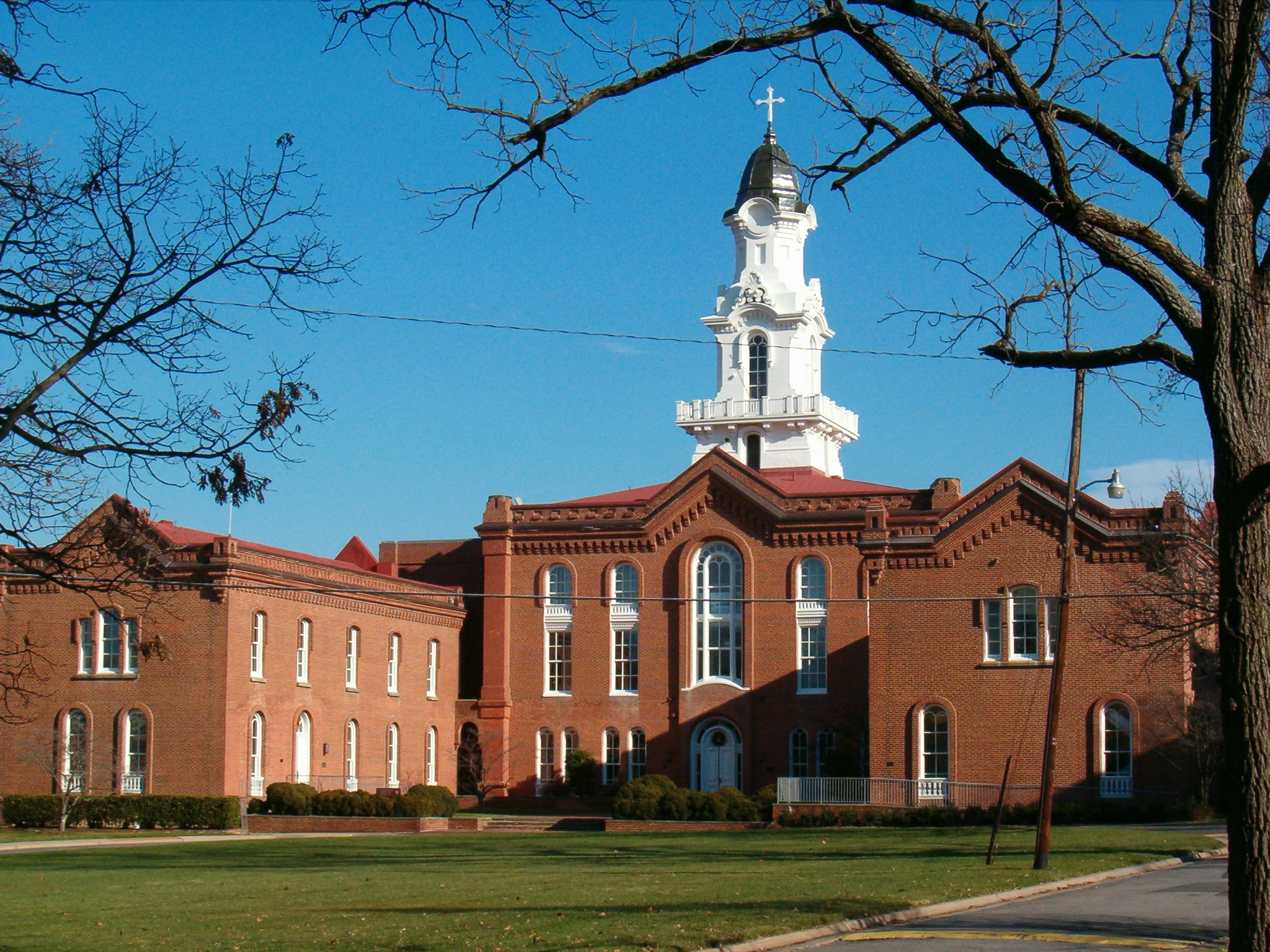
- Type: Private seminary
- Established: 1823; 203 years ago
- Affiliations: Episcopal Church
- President: Ian Markham
- Dean: Ian Markham
- Faculty: 21 full-time faculty and numerous adjunct professors
- Students: 168
- Location: Alexandria, Virginia, United States; 38°49′12″N 77°05′32″W
- Campus: Suburban
- Website: vts.edu
- Virginia Theological Seminary
- U.S. National Register of Historic Places
- Virginia Landmarks Register
- Location within Alexandria Location within Northern Virginia Location within Virginia Location within the United States
- Coordinates: 38°49′12″N 77°05′32″W
- NRHP reference No.: 80004166
- VLR No.: 100-0123

Significant dates
- Designated NRHP: May 16, 1978
- Designated VLR: May 16, 1978

Virginia Theological Seminary (VTS), formally the Protestant Episcopal Theological Seminary in Virginia, is an Episcopal seminary in Alexandria, Virginia. It is the largest and second-oldest such accredited seminary in the United States.

Established in 1823, VTS is situated on an 80-acre (320,000 m^{2}) suburban campus in Alexandria, and adjacent to the campus of Episcopal High School. The seminary's notable alumni have taken leadership roles in the American Episcopal Church, other Christian denominations in the United States, and overseas.

VTS is a member of the Washington Theological Consortium and since 1938 has been an accredited member institution of the Association of Theological Schools in the United States and Canada (ATS).

== History ==
=== Foundation and Civil War years ===
The seminary's foundation in 1823 was the result of the efforts of small group, led by William Holland Wilmer, who committed themselves to the task of recruiting and training a new generation of church leaders following the Revolutionary War. Francis Scott Key was a prominent member of this group supported by the vestry of St. Paul's Episcopal Church, Alexandria, which in 1818 formed a "Society for the Education of Pious Young Men for the Ministry of the Protestant Episcopal Church in Maryland and Virginia".

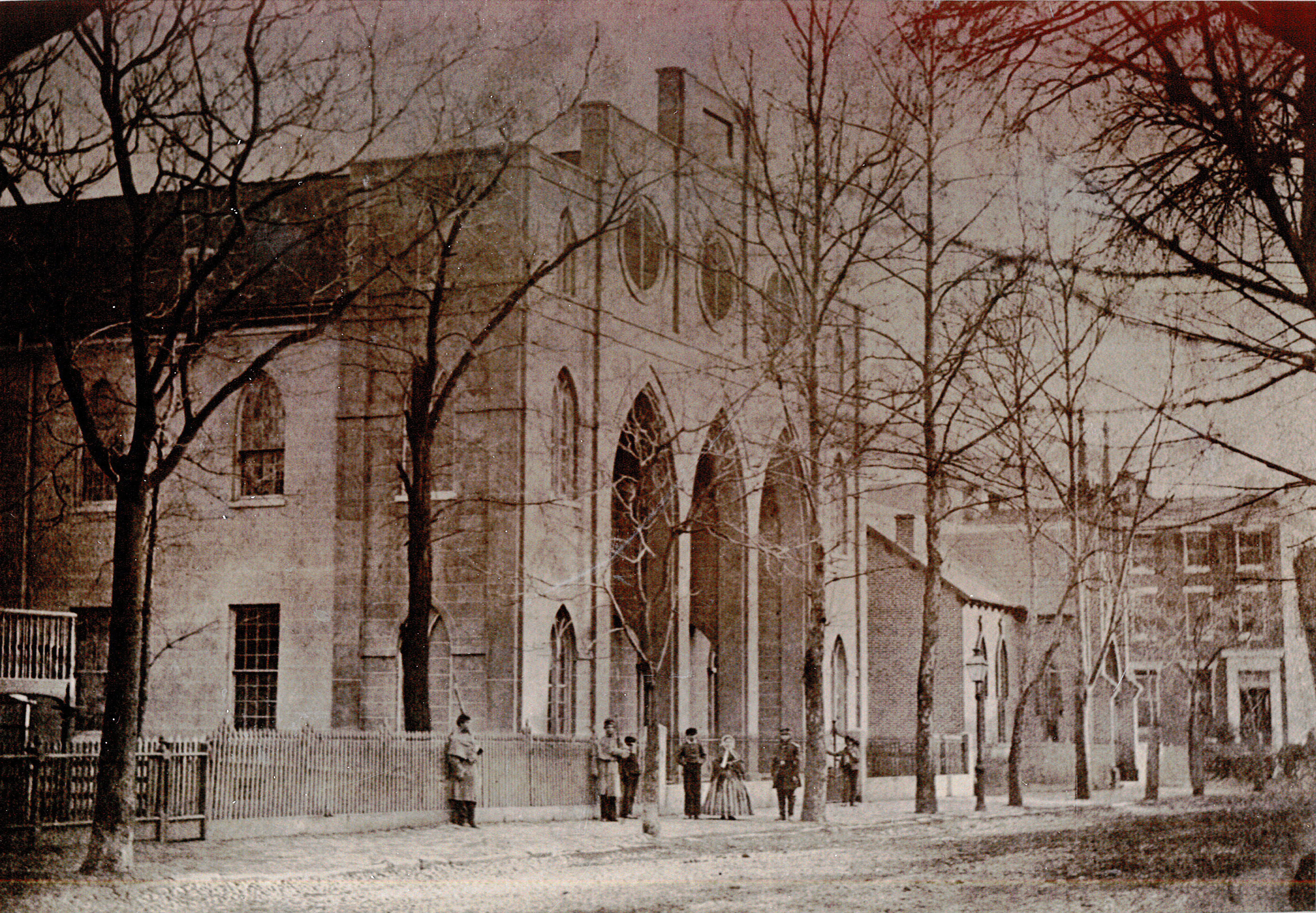
St. Paul's Episcopal Church, Alexandria pictured in 1862

In 1821 the Virginia convention of the Episcopal Church pledged its support for the establishment of a regional seminary. Acquiescing to lobbying by the College of William and Mary since at least 1815, the Virginia convention recommended the seminary be located in Williamsburg, to involve the Diocese of North Carolina, as well as those men from the District of Columbia and Diocese of Maryland who had been working together through the Education Society. However, the convention of the Diocese of Maryland failed to concur. The committee appointed by the Virginia convention changed its mind about the proposed seminary's location and accepted Alexandria after Congressman Hugh Nelson arranged significant funding and Wilmer offered space and a lecture room at St. Paul's Church.

The seminary formally opened in 1823 with two instructors and 14 enrolled students. The Revd. Reuel Keith, a graduate of Middlebury College, Andover Seminary and a former rector of Bruton Parish Church, became the seminary's first elected professor in 1823. Wilmer also taught theology and church history from 1823 to 1826. In contrast with General Theological Seminary in New York City, VTS was for much of the 19th century associated with the more low-church or evangelical Episcopalian tradition. Emphasis was placed on preaching the plan of salvation, simpler worship styles and the development of student-led missionary initiatives.

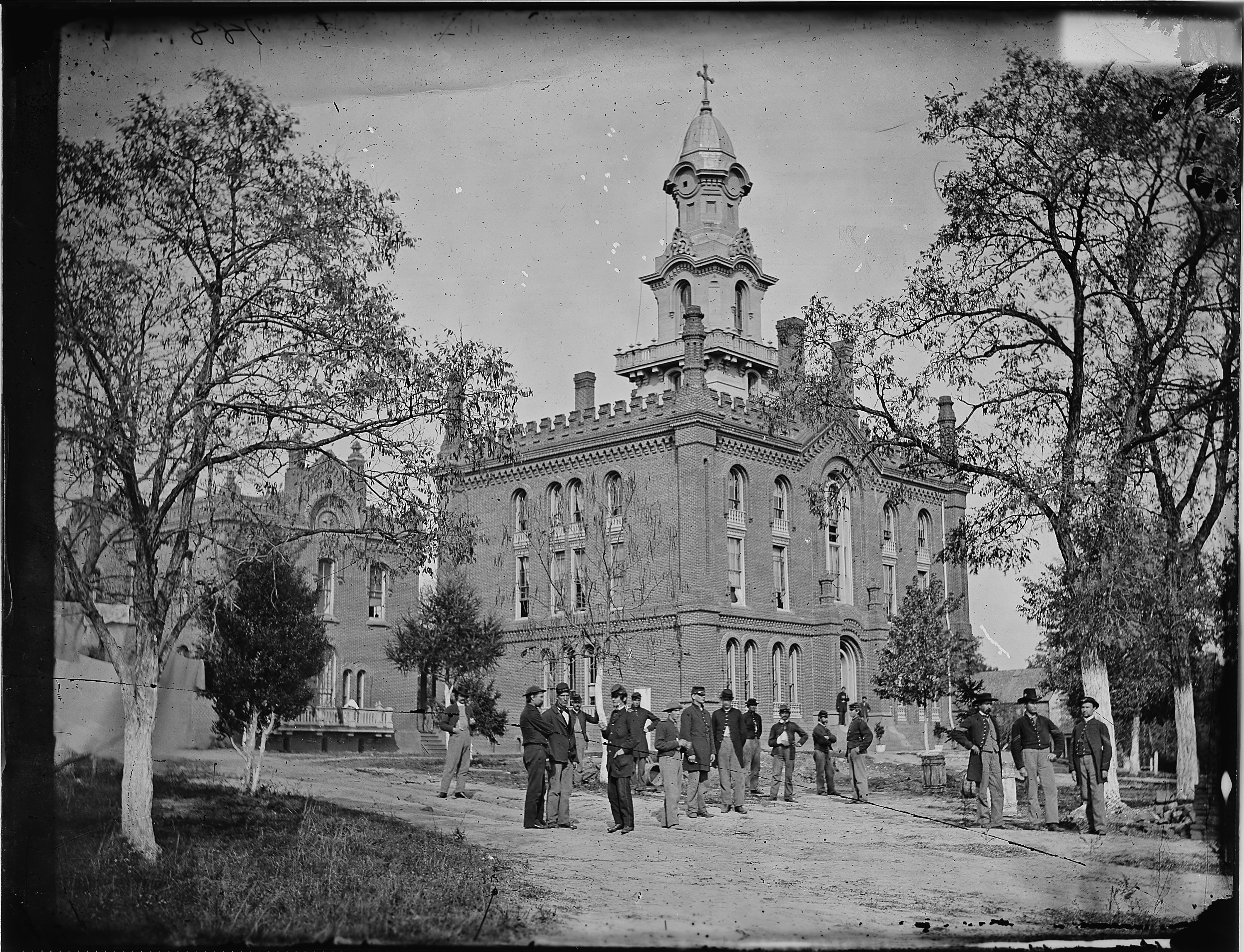
Aspinwall Hall, photographed during the American Civil War

Land provided in 1827 for the construction of a purpose built seminary campus prompted a move to hilltop site two and a half miles west of the growing city of Alexandria. The original library building was completed in 1855 and St. George's Hall in 1856. A private donation from two New York brothers, John and William Henry Aspinwall, enabled the construction and dedication of the landmark Italianate, Gothic Revival, Aspinwall Hall in October 1859. Aspinwall Hall and adjacent buildings of the period designed by Baltimore architect Norris Starkweather, are listed in the National Register of Historic Places.

In 1839, seminary purchased 80 acres (32 hectares) of nearby land to establish the Episcopal High School, then the first high school in Virginia. The organizations were governed by the same board of trustees and incorporated in 1854 as the "Protestant Episcopal Theological Seminary and High School in Virginia." In 1923, the school broke from the diocese and has been run by an independent board of trustees since then.

During the American Civil War from March 1862 to August 1865 the Union Army commandeered the seminary buildings and grounds for use as a military hospital. After the war, two professors and 11 veterans reopened the seminary on a campus that had been used to house 1,700 wounded Federal troops and to bury 500 soldiers.

=== Desegregation and merger with Bishop Payne Divinity School ===
In 1951 John T. Walker, later Bishop of Washington, became the first African-American student to enroll at the seminary. On June 3, 1953, Virginia Seminary merged with the Bishop Payne Divinity School, an African-American institution started by Virginia Seminary in Petersburg, Virginia, in 1878.

=== Reparations for slavery ===
In 2019, the seminary's leaders announced they were creating a $1.7 million (~$2.05 million in 2024) reparations fund to allocate money specifically for the descendants of the enslaved who worked on the campus, as well as for black seminarians and black worshipers who experienced discrimination. In February 2021, the reparations fund began disbursing payments to those descendants. Recipients of the payments would receive approximately $2,100 (~$2,495 in 2025) annually. As of May 2021, 15 people had received payments from the fund.

=== Mission ===
The seminary's stated mission is to form men and women for lay or ordained leadership and service in the ministry of the church. Out of its evangelical heritage and its missionary tradition, the seminary emphasizes the life of prayer, worship and community, the ministries of preaching, teaching, pastoral care and social justice. The seminary seeks to prepare its students as servants of Jesus Christ to equip the people of God for their vocation and ministry in the world. VTS also provides continuing theological education for clergy and laity of many Christian denominations.

The seminary maintains that theological education leading to ordination normally requires full-time study and full participation in its common life and worship. It also believes that theological education is greatly enhanced when it is done within an ecumenical, international and cross-cultural context.

=== List of deans ===
- William Sparrow: 1868–1874
- Joseph Packard: 1874–1896
- Cornelius Walker (Class of 1845): 1896–1898
- Angus M. Crawford (Honorary Degree, 1916): 1898–1916
- Berryman Green (Class of 1890): 1916–1931
- Wallace E. Rollins (Honorary Degree, 1915): 1931–1940
- Alexander C. Zabriskie: 1940–1950
- Arthur Stanley Brown-Serman (Honorary Degree, 1936): 1950–1952
- E. Felix Kloman (Class of 1925; Honorary Degree, 1975): 1952–1956
- Jesse M. Trotter (Class of 1936): 1956–1969
- G. Cecil Woods (Class of 1953): 1969–1982
- Richard Reid: 1982–1994
- Martha J. Horne (Class of 1983): 1994–2007
- Ian S. Markham: 2007–present

== Academics ==
=== Degree programs ===
- The Master in Divinity (M.Div.) program is a three-year residential program designed for those in the ordination process in the Episcopal Church or the equivalent in other denominations. It provides a foundation in all theological areas: biblical studies, historical studies, ministerial studies, studies in Christian worship, studies in faith and society, and theological studies.
- The Master of Arts (MA) program with concentration in Theological Studies, Christian Formation, Religion & Culture, or Biblical Interpretation.
- The Anglican Studies program for those who seek ordination in The Episcopal Church but who have earned a theological degree from a seminary or divinity school of another denomination.
- Doctor of Ministry (D.Min.) in Ministry Development.
- Doctor of Ministry in Educational Leadership.
- Non-degree studies are also offered.

=== Faculty ===
Replacing Martha J. Horne, who served as dean and president from 1994 to 2007, Ian Markham currently serves as the 14th Dean and President of Virginia Theological Seminary.

=== Admissions ===
Total enrollment as of July 2012 was 227.

- Median M.Div. student age: 34 (33 percent in their 20s)
- Married: 48 percent
- Men 52 / Women 48
- International students: 8
- Full-time faculty: 22
- Adjunct faculty: 29
- Field education associates: 50
- Staff: 56

== Campus ==
The campus is located at 3737 Seminary Road.

=== Chapel ===
The first seminary chapel was badly damaged during the Civil War and replaced in 1881 by Immanuel Chapel, a large Gothic Revival structure designed by architect Charles E. Cassell. On October 22, 2010, fire destroyed the historic building although no other part of the seminary was damaged and there were no injuries. Several of the stained glass windows were lost, including the Miriam window and the window behind the altar. The iconic words, "Go Ye Into All The World And Preach The Gospel", painted above the east window were also destroyed by the heat of the fire. The pulpit, the lectern and its Bible for readings during services, and the baptismal font, were not damaged by the fire. The damage was estimated at $2.5 million (~$3.5 million in 2024). An investigation by the US Bureau of Alcohol, Tobacco, Firearms and Explosives (ATF) and the Alexandria Fire Marshal's Office determined that the fire was of accidental nature.

After the fire the foundations and lower walls of the 1881 structure were secured and retained to form an open air chapel garden. Supported by a capital campaign the seminary's new Immanuel Chapel was built at an adjacent site. Consecrated by the Presiding Bishop of the Episcopal Church, the Most Revd. Katharine Jefferts Schori, on October 13, 2015, the sermon at the service of consecration was preached by the Archbishop of Canterbury, Justin Welby. Designed by the architectural office of Robert A. M. Stern, the new chapel features items salvaged from the 2010 fire, a set of eight change ringing bells produced by the Whitechapel Bell Foundry and a 2 manual and pedal 27 stop tracker action organ (Opus 70) from Taylor and Boody.

=== Library ===
The Bishop Payne Library, named after the Bishop Payne Divinity School, serves as the seminary's library. The collection numbers over 225,000 volumes of books and bound periodicals and 190,000 e-books. Specialist areas of focus include biblical studies, church history, theology, the Protestant Reformation, missions, liturgies and church music.

In partnership with the Historical Society of the Episcopal Church, the Bishop Payne Library also hosts the African American Episcopal Historical Collection (AAEHC), documenting the history of the African-American Episcopalians in the United States.

== Alumni ==
Alumni of VTS have served in prominent lay and ordained leadership roles in the Episcopal Church in the United States. Following the words the Great Commission many graduates have also contributed their skills to the development of missions in the wider Anglican Communion. Notable among this number:

- William Boone, (1811–1864) missionary bishop to the Anglican diocese of Shanghai
- John Payne, (1815–1874) missionary bishop to the Episcopal Church in Liberia
- Channing Moore Williams (1829–1910) missionary bishop to China and Japan, leading figure in the establishment of the Nippon Sei Ko Kai, (the Anglican Church in Japan) and founder of Rikkyo University
- George Herbert Kinsolving (1849–1928) second bishop of the Episcopal Diocese of Texas
- Lindel Tsen (1885–1954) first and only Chinese Presiding Bishop of the Chung Hua Sheng Kung Hui

== See also ==
- Bishop Payne Divinity School
