= Mark Chapman (theologian) =

British theologian (born 1960)

The Reverend Canon Mark Chapman
- Born: 1960 (age 65–66)

Academic background
- Education: Trinity College, Oxford

Academic work
- Discipline: Theologian
- Institutions: University of Sheffield; Ripon College, Cuddesdon; Faculty of Theology and Religion, University of Oxford

Mark David Chapman (born 1960) is a British Anglican priest, theologian, historian, and academic. He served as Vice-Principal of Ripon College Cuddesdon from 2002 to 2024 and has been Professor of the History of Modern Theology at the University of Oxford since 2015. In 2021, he was awarded an honorary Doctor of Theology by the Protestant Theological Faculty of the University of Bonn. In November 2024, he received the Lanfranc Award for services to theological education from the Archbishop of Canterbury.

== Early life and education ==
Mark David Chapman was born in 1960 and grew up in Essex and Berkshire. He was educated at St Bartholomew's School in Newbury, Berkshire, which was an all-boys grammar school when he entered, becoming a mixed-sex comprehensive school in 1975.

He studied Philosophy, Politics and Economics (specialising in politics and philosophy) and theology at Trinity College, Oxford, graduating with a first-class honours degree in 1983, and proceeding to a Master of Arts degree in 1988. He remained at Trinity to complete a Diploma in Theology in 1984, followed by a Doctor of Philosophy (DPhil) degree in 1989. His doctoral thesis was entitled Theology as a vocation: Ernst Troeltsch as philosophical theologian.

During his doctoral research, he spent a year as a DAAD scholar at the Protestant Theological Faculty of LMU Munich.

== Career ==
Chapman was appointed Stephenson Research Fellow at the University of Sheffield in 1989. In 1992, he joined the staff of Ripon College Cuddesdon. From 2002 to 2024, he served as Vice-Principal of the college. In 2015, he was appointed Professor of the History of Modern Theology at the University of Oxford. He has also been a visiting professor at Oxford Brookes University and the Clermont Auvergne University. He is co-editor of the Journal for the History of Modern Theology and series co-editor of Pathways in Ecumenical and Interreligious Dialogue (Springer).

Having trained for ordination on the Oxford Ministry Course, Chapman was ordained in the Church of England as a deacon in 1994 and as a priest in 1995. From 1994 to 1999, he served as a non-stipendiary minister in Dorchester. He subsequently held similar posts in Wheatley from 1999 to 2014, and in Garsington, Cuddesdon and Horspath from 2014 to 2024. Since 2024, he has held permission to officiate in the Diocese of Worcester. He is also Canon Theologian of Truro Cathedral.

From 2010 to 2021, Chapman was a member of the General Synod of the Church of England, representing the Diocese of Oxford. He is co-chair of the Meissen Theological Conference.

== Selected works ==
Chapman's research has focused on the history of Christian theology, particularly modern doctrine, the history of Anglicanism, liberal theology, and Christianity in the United States. He has also written on the history of Christianity at Cuddesdon and has lectured internationally.

His published works include:

=== Books ===
- Anglicanism: A Very Short Introduction (Very Short Introductions, no. 149; Oxford University Press, 2006).
- Doing God: Religion and Public Policy in Brown's Britain (Darton, Longman and Todd, 2008).
- Anglican Theology (T. & T. Clark, 2012).
- The Fantasy of Reunion: Anglicans, Catholics, and Ecumenism, 1833–1880 (Oxford University Press, 2014).
- Theology and Society in Three Cities: Berlin, Oxford and Chicago, 1800–1914 (Cambridge: James Clarke, 2014).
- Theology at War and Peace: English Theology and Germany in the First World War (Routledge, 2017).

=== Edited volumes ===
- Reflections on Episcopacy in Theory and Practice (with Frank-Dieter Fischbach, Friederike Nüssel and Matthias Grebe). Beihefte zur Ökumenischen Rundschau, vol. 135 (Leipzig: Evangelische Verlagsanstalt, 2022). ISBN 978-3-374-07123-4
- Serbia and the Church of England: The First World War and a New Ecumenism (with Bogdan Lubardic; Palgrave Macmillan, 2022). ISBN 978-3-031-05976-6
- Changing the Church (with Vladimir Latinovic; Palgrave Macmillan, 2020). ISBN 978-3-030-53424-0
- Revisiting the Meissen Agreement after 30 Years (with Matthias Grebe and Friederike Nüssel). Beihefte zur Ökumenischen Rundschau, vol. 126 (Leipzig: Evangelische Verlagsanstalt, 2020). ISBN 978-3-374-06303-1
- Costly Communion: Ecumenical Initiative and Sacramental Strife in the Anglican Communion (with Jeremy Bonner; Leiden: Brill, 2019, Anglican–Episcopal Theology and History, vol. 4). ISBN 978-90-04-38869-7
- New Approaches in History and Theology to Same-Sex Love and Desire (with Dominic Janes; New York and Basingstoke: Palgrave Macmillan, 2018). ISBN 978-3-319-70210-0
- Hope in the Ecumenical Future (New York and Basingstoke: Palgrave Macmillan, 2017). ISBN 978-3-319-63371-8
- Pathways for Ecclesial Dialogue in the Twenty-first Century: Revisiting Ecumenical Method (with Miriam Haar; New York and Basingstoke: Palgrave Macmillan, 2015). ISBN 978-1-137-57111-3
- The Oxford Handbook of Anglican Studies (with Martyn Percy and Sathi Clarke; Oxford: Oxford University Press, 2015). ISBN 978-0-19-921856-1; paperback edition, 2018.
- The Established Church: Past, Present and Future (with Judith Maltby and William Whyte; London: Mowbray, 2011).
- The Hope of Things to Come: Anglicanism and the Future (London: Mowbray, 2010). ISBN 978-0-567-58884-5
- Christ and Culture: Communion after Lambeth (with Martyn Percy, Ian Markham and Barney Hawkins; Canterbury Studies in Anglicanism; Canterbury Press, 2010). ISBN 978-1-85311-948-4
- Women as Bishops (with James Rigney; London: Mowbray, 2008). ISBN 978-0-567-03224-9
- The Anglican Covenant: Unity and Diversity in the Anglican Communion (London: Mowbray, 2008). ISBN 978-0-567-03253-9
- Living the Magnificat: Affirming Catholicism in a Broken World (London: Mowbray, 2007). ISBN 978-1-906286-06-4
- Celebrating Creation: Affirming Catholicism and the Revelation of God's Glory (London: Darton, Longman and Todd, 2004). ISBN 978-0-232-52560-1
- Ambassadors of Christ: A Commemoration of 150 Years of Theological Education in Cuddesdon, 1854–2004 (Aldershot: Ashgate, 2004). ISBN 978-0-7546-3754-7 (hbk); 978-0-7546-3755-4 (pbk).
- The Future of Liberal Theology (Aldershot: Ashgate, 2002). ISBN 978-0-7546-0686-4

=== Journal articles (2013–2025) ===
- "From the Settlements to the Trenches: The First World War Chaplaincy of Maurice Peel”, Studies in Church History 62 (2026), 349–368.
- "A Tale of Two Congresses: London 1908 and Toronto 1963", Journal of the Canadian Church Historical Society 60 (2025), 28–48 and Anglican and Episcopal History 95:1 (2026), 26-48..
- "The Sea of Faith in Context", Modern Believing 65:3 (2024), 257–266. doi:10.3828/mb.2024.17
- "Enjoying What Comes Naturally: The Church of England and Sexuality in the 1930s", Studies in Church History 60 (2024), 453–476. doi:10.1017/stc.2024.21
- "Liturgies of War and Peace", Koinonia: The Journal of the Anglican and Eastern Churches Association NS 79 (2023), 9–30.
- "Alice Gardner (1854–1927): Modernist Historian of Religion", Modern Believing 64:4 (2023), 374–380.
- "Synodality in Anglicanism", Materialdienst des konfessionskundlichen Instituts Bensheim 73:2 (2022), 83–89. doi:10.1515/mdki-2022-0014
- "Joseph Armitage Robinson, Glastonbury and Historical Remembrance", Zeitschrift für neuere Theologiegeschichte/Journal of the History of Modern Theology 28:2 (2021), 228–245.
- "The Girton Conference 100 Years On", Modern Believing 63:3 (2021), 220–230. doi:10.3828/mb.2021.14
- "Conclusion: Directions for Anglican Studies", in Daniel Joslyn-Siemiatkoski and J. A. McDougall (eds), The Future of Anglican Studies, Journal of Anglican Studies (2021), 28–32. doi:10.1017/S1740355321000097
- "The Lambeth Appeal and the Appeal of Britain", The Ecumenical Review 72:4 (2020), 683–690. doi:10.1111/erev.12560
- "Un-Protestant and Un-English: Anglicanism and the 1920 Lambeth Conference 'Appeal to All Christian People'", Ecclesiology 16 (2020), 159–174.
- "Anglo-Catholicism in West Wales: Lewis Gilbertson, Llangorwen and Elerch", The Journal of Religious History, Literature and Culture 6:1 (2020), 71–95. doi:10.16922/jrhlc.6.1.4
- "Exporting Godliness: The Church, Education and 'Higher Civilisation' in the British Empire from the Late Nineteenth Century", Studies in Church History 55 (2019), 381–409.
- "Remembering: Living with the Legacy of the Reformation", One in Christ 51:2 (2017), 260–275.
- "William Reed Huntington, American Catholicity and the Chicago–Lambeth Quadrilateral", in Paul Avis and Benjamin M. Guyer (eds), The Lambeth Conference: Theology, History, Polity and Purpose (London: Bloomsbury, 2017), 84–106.

=== Book chapters (2013–2025) ===
- “Gender, Sex and the Future of Establishment” in Joshua Hordern and Graham Tomlin (eds), A Voice in the Wilderness (London: SCM Press, 2026), 104-117.
- “Living in Love and Faith: The Failure of History” in Theo Hobson and John Inge (eds), Created for Love: Towards a New Teaching on Sex and Marriage (London: Canterbury Press, 2025), 75-86.
- “Theology and the religion of humanity: Free theology before the First World War” in Silvio Hermann De Francheschi, Martin Dutron and Jean-Pascal Gay, Produire et publier de la théologie dans le monde catholique: Des Restaurations à Vatican II (Turnhout, Belgium: Brepols, 2025), 175-187.
- “Local Ecumenism and the Art of the Possible” in Mark Chapman, Friederike Nüssel, Matthias Grebe and Frank-Dieter Fischbach (eds), Towards Interchangeability II: Local and Legal Perspectives and the Meissen Agreement (Leipzig: Evangelische Verlagsanstalt, 2025), 34-52.
- "Enrico Campello and the Failure of Reformed Catholicism in Italy", in Georgiana Huian, Erika Moser and Milan Kostrešević (eds), Konflikt und Kontinuität: Religiöse Biographien im 19. und 20. Jahrhundert. Festschrift für Angela Berlis (Göttingen: Vandenhoeck & Ruprecht, 2025), 81–100.
- "Troeltsch and the New Europe", in Friedemann Voigt (ed.), Zusammenbestehbarkeit. Ernst Troeltsch: Religion – Politik – Kultur (Berlin: Walter de Gruyter, 2025), 219–235.
- "Theology", in Anthony J. Steinhoff and Jeffrey T. Zalar (eds), Handbook of Religious Culture in Nineteenth-Century Europe (Berlin: Walter de Gruyter, 2024), 189–205.
- "The Girton Conference of 1921 and the Reshaping of Liberalism in the Church of England", in Alan Race and Jonathan Clatworthy (eds), What Christ? Whose Christ? New Options for Old Theories (Durham: Sacristy Press, 2024), 18–35.
- "Christianity and Law in the Nineteenth Century", in John Witte Jr. and Rafael Domingo (eds), The Oxford Handbook of Christianity and Law (Oxford: Oxford University Press, 2024), 196–207.
- "Unity and the Anglican Communion: The Problem of Bishops", in Valdis Tēraudkalns (ed.), Porvoo Agreement: A Way Forward (Riga: University of Latvia Press, 2023), 31–40.
