= Henry Liddon =

English theologian (1829–1890)

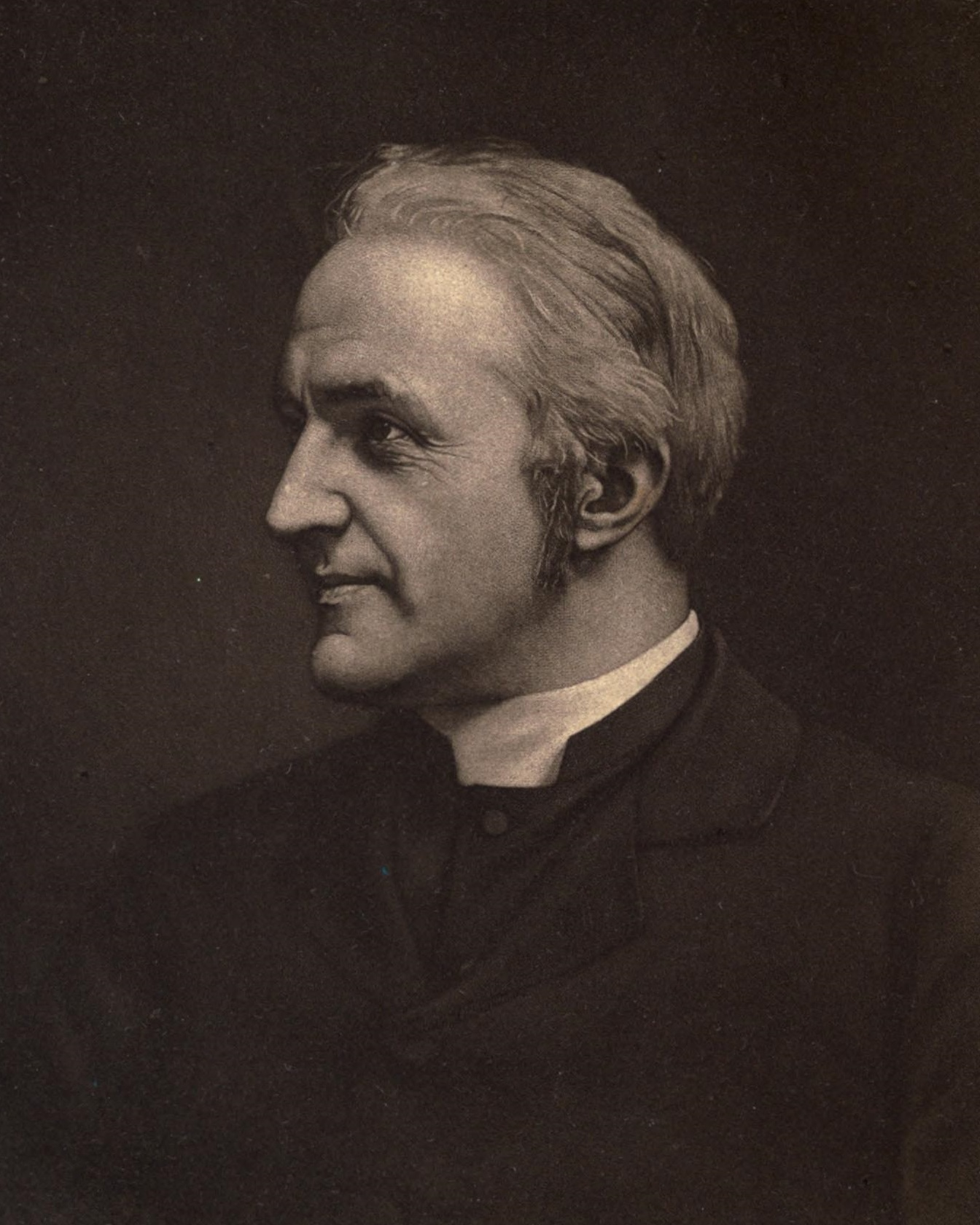

Henry Parry Liddon (20 August 1829 – 9 September 1890), usually cited as H. P. Liddon, was an English Anglican theologian. From 1870 to 1882, he was Dean Ireland's Professor of the Exegesis of Holy Scripture at the University of Oxford.

== Biography ==
The son of a naval captain, Liddon was born on 20 August 1829 at North Stoneham, near Eastleigh, Hampshire. He was educated at King's College School, and at Christ Church, Oxford, where he graduated, taking a second class, in 1850. As vice principal of the theological college at Cuddesdon (1854–1859) he wielded considerable influence, and, on returning to Oxford as vice-principal of St Edmund Hall, became a force among the undergraduates, exercising his influence in opposition to the liberal reaction against Tractarianism, which had set in after John Henry Newman's conversion to Catholicism in 1845.

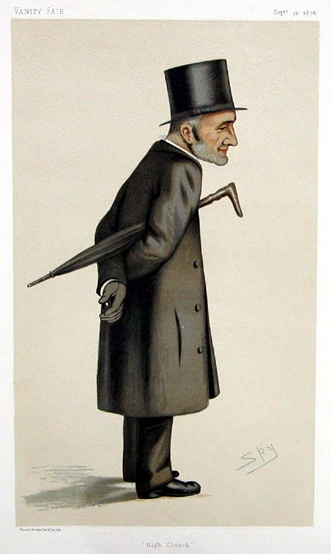
An 1876 caricature of Liddon from Vanity Fair, titled "High Church"

In 1864, Walter Kerr Hamilton, the Bishop of Salisbury, whose examining chaplain Liddon had been, appointed him prebendary of Salisbury Cathedral. In 1866, he delivered his Bampton Lectures on the doctrine of the divinity of Christ, published as The Divinity of Our Lord and Saviour Jesus Christ (1867). From that time his fame as a preacher was established. In 1870, he was made canon of St Paul's Cathedral, London. He had before this published Some Words for God against the scepticism of the day. His preaching at St Paul's soon attracted vast crowds. The afternoon sermon, which fell to the canon in residence, had usually been delivered in the choir, but soon after Liddon's appointment it became necessary to preach the sermon under the dome, where from 3000 to 4000 persons used to gather to hear him.

Liddon was praised for grasp of his subject, clarity and lucidity, use of illustration, vividness of imagination, elegance of diction, and sympathy with the intellectual position of those whom he addressed. In the arrangement of his material, he is thought to have imitated the French preachers of the age of Louis XIV.

In 1870, Liddon had also been made Dean Ireland's Professor of the Exegesis of Holy Scripture at Oxford. The combination of the two appointments gave him extensive influence over the Church of England. With Dean Church he restored the influence of the Tractarian school, and he succeeded in popularising the opinions which, in the hands of Edward Bouverie Pusey and John Keble, had appealed to thinkers and scholars. He opposed the Public Worship Regulation Act 1874 (37 & 38 Vict. c. 85), and denounced the Bulgarian atrocities of 1876.

In 1882, he resigned his professorship and travelled in Palestine and Egypt; and showed his interest in the Old Catholic movement by visiting Döllinger at Munich. In 1886, he became chancellor of St Paul's, and declined more than one offer of a bishopric. Liddon was a friend of Lewis Carroll, who accompanied him on a trip to Moscow where Liddon made approaches to leading Russian Orthodox clergy, seeking closer links between them and the Church of England.

He died on 9 September 1890, at the height of his reputation, having nearly completed a biography of Pusey, whom he admired; this work was completed after his death by John Octavius Johnston and Robert Wilson. According to the Encyclopædia Britannica Eleventh Edition, Liddon's influence during his life was due to his personal fascination and his pulpit oratory rather than to his intellect. As a theologian his outlook was old-fashioned; to the last he maintained the narrowly orthodox standpoint of Pusey and Keble, in opposition to modernist thought and scholarship. The publication in 1889 of Lux Mundi edited by Charles Gore, a series of essays attempting to harmonise Anglican Catholic doctrine with modern thought, showed that even at Pusey House, established as the citadel of Puseyism at Oxford, the principles of Pusey were being departed from. He was the last of the classical pulpit orators of the English Church, the last great popular exponent of the traditional Anglican orthodoxy, with the exception of John Charles Ryle (1816-1900), the first Anglican bishop of Liverpool (1880-1900).

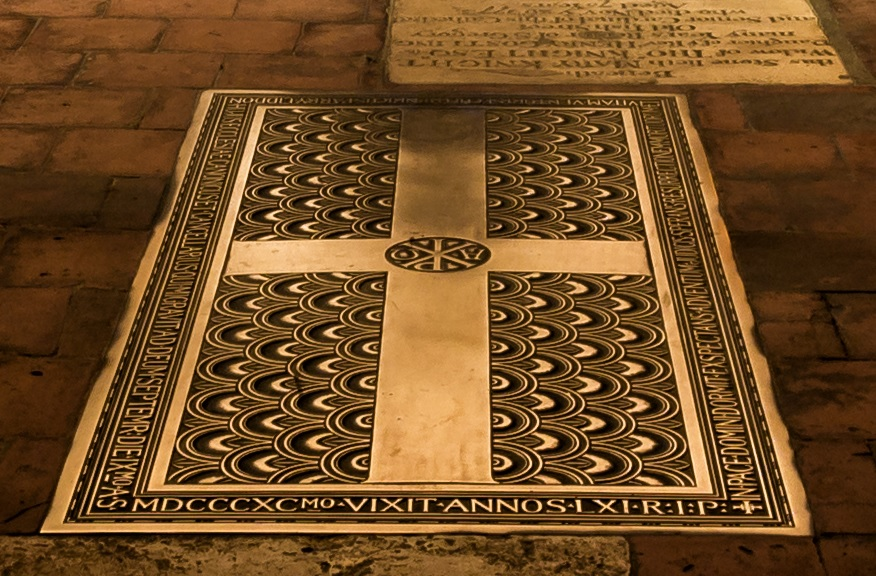
Henry Liddon's grave in St Paul's Cathedral

Liddon is buried in the Chapel of the Order of the British Empire in the crypt of St Paul's Cathedral, close to the grave of Henry Hart Milman.

== Works ==
Besides the works mentioned, Liddon published several volumes of sermons, including a book on sermons on the Magnificat, a volume of Lent lectures entitled Some Elements of Religion (1870), and a collection of Essays and Addresses on such themes as Buddhism, Dante, etc.

Liddon wrote Explanatory Analysis of Paul's Epistle to the Romans published in 1899 and Explanatory Analysis of Paul's First Epistle to Timothy published in 1897. Both were published posthumously.

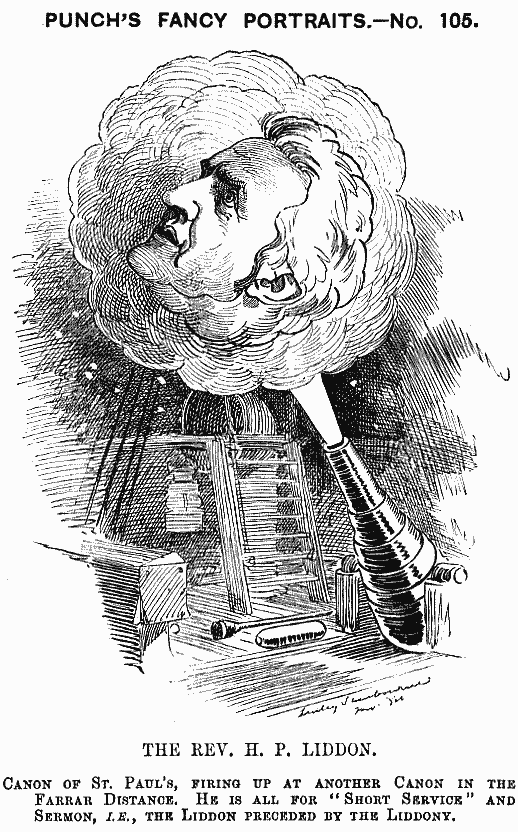
Caricature from Punch, 1882

Liddon was chosen to preach to the International Medical Congress at St Paul's Cathedral in London in 1881. During the sermon, he addressed the subject of Darwinian evolution, which was a point of great debate among leading scientists and physicians of the day:

...We cannot forget what our faith teaches us about its origin, its present purpose, and its coming destiny…For our part, as we contemplate the human body, we cannot forget its author. Even if evolution should win for itself a permanent place in our conceptions of the past history of man, it would still leave untouched the great question of man's origin....

He is also noted for his translation and abridgement of Rosmini's Of the Five Wounds of the Holy Church.

== Notes ==
Attribution
