= Ibrahim M. Abu-Rabi' =

Ibrahim M. Abu-Rabi' (إبراهيم محمد هزاع ابوربيع) was a professor in Islamic studies (Department of History and Classics) at the University of Alberta, Edmonton, Canada, and the chair of the Edmonton Council of Muslim Communities. His primary areas of academic specialization were the Middle East and International Relations. He also had a special interest in the study and practice of interfaith dialogue between the Islamic and Christian religious traditions.

== Education ==
Abu-Rabi‘ was born in Nazareth and completed his schooling in Palestine. He attended university in the United States, earning a Master of Arts (MA) in religious studies from Temple University in 1983 and a MA in political science from the University of Cincinnati in 1982. He earned his Doctor of Philosophy (PhD) in Islamic studies, with concentrations in modern Islamic thought and comparative Islamic cultures, from the Temple University Department of Religion in 1987. His dissertation was entitled "Islam and Search for Social Order in Modern Egypt: An Intellectual Biography of Shaykh al-Azhar 'Abd al-Halim Mahmud." Abu-Rabi‘ left Temple University and accepted temporary placements at Virginia Commonwealth University and the University of Texas at Austin.

== Career ==
In 1991 Abu-Rabi‘ accepted a post at the Hartford Seminary in Connecticut, serving as a professor for the then-named Macdonald Center for the Study of Islam and Christian-Muslim Relations (now the Duncan Black Macdonald Center for the Study of Islam and Christian-Muslim Relations). In addition to his work with interfaith dialogue, Abu-Rabi‘ specialized in issues of contemporary Islamic thought, particularly in relation to religion and society and mysticism.

In 2006 he was the Senior Fulbright Scholar in Singapore and Indonesia whilst based at the Institute of Defence and Strategic Studies on the Nanyang Technological University campus. In 2008 Abu-Rabi‘ was appointed the first holder of the Edmonton Council of Muslim Communities Chair in Islamic Studies at the University of Alberta, the first teaching and research chair of its kind in Canada.

== Death ==
Ibrahim Abu-Rabi‘ died of a sudden heart attack on 2 July 2011 while attending a conference in Amman, Jordan.

"I am greatly saddened to learn of the sudden loss of one of our own, professor Ibrahim Abu-Rabi‘, chair of Islamic studies," said university President Indira Samarasekera. "As a mentor and a teacher, he was well known for his passion for teaching and his dedication to building understanding between people of various faiths. He will be remembered for his enthusiasm for his work, his unwavering support of his colleagues and students, and his care and compassion for all.". He also had two kids.

== Publications ==
Abu-Rabi‘ was a devoted researcher and a prolific writer, with numerous titles to his credit. His work The Contemporary Arab Reader on Political Islam (University of Alberta Press, 2010) is a collection of writings from highly influential figures in the field of Islamism that attempts to address misunderstood notions of contemporary Islam. In an interview from the spring 2011 edition of WOA (Work of Arts), the U of A Faculty of Arts alumni magazine, Abu-Rabi‘ said, "most Islamist groups are pro-democracy and anti-violence, but you’d never know this from what’s reported in the press. I wanted to give Islamists the chance to speak for themselves." The professor expressed a belief that out of the many books written in the West that purport to explain Islamism, virtually all have been written by westerners; that is, Islamist voices have remained largely absent.

A curriculum vitae (CV) containing Abu-Rabi‘'s publications is available on the website of the Hartford Theological Seminary, where he taught before moving to the University of Alberta. Abu-Rabi‘ was affiliated with the International Council for Middle East Studies in Washington, DC and a list of his publications was placed on the council's website.

Abu-Rabi‘ served as the senior editor of The Muslim World journal.
