= John Johnston (priest) =

British Anglican priest and theologian

John Octavius Johnston (1 November 1852 – 6 November 1923) was a British Anglican priest and theologian.

== Life ==
Johnston was born in Barnstaple, Devon, and educated at Barnstaple Grammar School, before studying at Keble College, Oxford, from 1874 to 1879. He obtained a second-class degree in Literae Humaniores and a first-class degree in theology, winning the Senior Hall Houghton Greek Testament Prize in 1880.

He was ordained as a priest in the Church of England, and was curate of Kidlington, Oxfordshire from 1879 to 1881. Between 1881 and 1884, he was appointed principal of St Stephen's House, Oxford (an Anglican theological college, which is now a permanent private hall of the University of Oxford). He was tutor in theology at Merton College, Oxford, from 1883 to 1895, holding in addition between 1885 and 1895 the positions of Merton College chaplain and vicar of All Saints Church, Oxford. In 1895, he was appointed Principal of Cuddesdon Theological College and vicar of the Church of All Saints, Cuddesdon, Oxfordshire, leaving in 1913. He was an honorary canon of Christ Church Cathedral, Oxford from 1902 to 1913, and in 1913 became Canon and Chancellor of Lincoln Cathedral. He died on 6 November 1923.

His obituary in The Times said that he "exercised no small influence in the Church of England, partly by his books and partly by his work in training ordination candidates." His publications included work on Three Anti-Pelagian Treatises of St Augustine, Dr Liddon's Life of Dr Pusey, Dr Pusey's Spiritual Letters and Life and Letters of H. P. Liddon. The Life of Pusey, according to his obituary in The Times, was "monumental" and had "practically killed" Liddon to prepare; Johnston completed the work. His one-volume Life of Liddon was regarded by The Times as a better tribute to its subject than Liddon's Life of Pusey.
