= Paula Gooder =

British theologian and lay reader (born 1969)

- Born: 1969 (age 56–57); Manchester, England

Academic background
- Education: Worcester College, Oxford; The Queen's College, Oxford
- Thesis: Only the third heaven?: 2 Corinthians 12:1-10 and heavenly ascent (1998)

Academic work
- Discipline: Theology
- Sub-discipline: New Testament; Women in the Bible
- Institutions: Ripon College Cuddesdon; The Queen's Foundation; Bible Society; Anglican Diocese of Birmingham; St Paul's Cathedral

Paula Gooder (born 1969) is a British theologian and Anglican lay reader who specialises in the New Testament. She is canon chancellor at St Paul's Cathedral. She has previously taught at two theological colleges, Ripon College Cuddesdon and The Queen's Foundation, served as theologian in residence for the Bible Society (2013–2017), and as Director of Mission, Learning and Development in the Diocese of Birmingham (2017–2018). She is a freelance writer and speaker.

== Early life and education ==
Gooder was born in 1969 in Manchester, England. From 1988 to 1992, she studied theology at Worcester College, Oxford, graduating with a first class Bachelor of Arts (BA) degree. She completed her Doctor of Philosophy (DPhil) degree at The Queen's College, Oxford in 1998. Her doctoral thesis was titled "Only the third heaven?: 2 Corinthians 12:1-10 and heavenly ascent".

== Career ==
From 1995 to 2001, Gooder was a tutor in Biblical Studies at Ripon College Cuddesdon, an Anglican theological college near Oxford. She then taught at The Queen's Foundation, an ecumenical theological college in Birmingham, while attending conferences or giving lectures independently. She left The Queen's Foundation in 2007 to become a full-time freelance writer and lecturer. From September 2013 to 2017, she was Theologian in Residence for the Bible Society: this became a full-time role in 2016. In March 2017, she joined the Church of England Diocese of Birmingham as Director of Mission, Learning and Development. In October 2018, it was announced she would be leaving her role in the Diocese of Birmingham to return to freelance work. In February 2019, it was announced that Gooder would be the next chancellor of St Paul's Cathedral in the Diocese of London; she was licensed to the post on 23 February 2019.

=== Church of England ===
Gooder is a reader (lay minister) in the Church of England. From 2005 to 2015, she was an elected member of the General Synod of the Church of England. Since 2011, she has been a member of the Anglican–Roman Catholic International Commission.

== Personal life ==
In 1998, Gooder married Peter Babington. He is an Anglican priest, who has been priest in charge of St Mary le Strand and St Clement Danes since 2020. Together they have two children.

== Selected works ==
- Gooder, Paula (2006). Only the third heaven?: 2 Corinthians 12:1-10 and heavenly ascent. London: T & T Clark. ISBN 978-0567042446.
- Gooder, Paula (2008). Searching for Meaning: An Introduction to Interpreting the New Testament. London: SPCK Publishing. ISBN 978-0281058358.
- Gooder, Paula (2008). The Meaning is in the Waiting: The Spirit of Advent. Norwich: Canterbury Press. ISBN 978-1853119088.
- Rowling, Cathy; Gooder, Paula (2009). Reader ministry explored. London: SPCK Publishing. ISBN 978-0281067404.
- Gooder, Paula (2011). Heaven. London: SPCK. ISBN 978-0281062348.
- Gooder, Paula (2012). Everyday God: The Spirit of the Ordinary. Norwich: Canterbury Press. ISBN 978-1848251168.
- Croft, Steven; Gooder, Paula, eds. (2013). Women and Men in Scripture and the Church: A guide to the key issues. Norwich: Canterbury Press. ISBN 978-1848255104.
- Gooder, Paula (2014). Journey to the Empty Tomb (Biblical Explorations). Norwich: Canterbury Press. ISBN 978-1848255715.
- Gooder, Paula (2015). Journey to the Manger: Exploring the Birth of Jesus (Biblical Explorations). Norwich: Canterbury Press. ISBN 978-1848257948.
- Gooder, Paula (2016). Body: Biblical spirituality for the whole person. London: SPCK Publishing. ISBN 978-0281071005.
- Gooder, Paula (2018). Phoebe: A Story. London: Hodder & Stoughton. ISBN 978-1473669727.
- Gooder, Paula (2020). The Parables. Norwich: Canterbury Press. ISBN 9781786221537.
- Gooder, Paula; Barrett, Ally (2022). Women of Holy Week: An Easter Journey in Nine Stories. London: Church House Publishing. ISBN 9781781402894.
- Gooder, Paula (2022). Lydia: A Story. London: Hodder & Stoughton. ISBN 978-1444792065.
- Gooder, Paula (2024). Women of the Nativity: An Advent and Christmas Journey in Nine Stories. London: Church House Publishing. ISBN 978-1781404607.
