= Dean of Derby =

Church of England senior clergy member

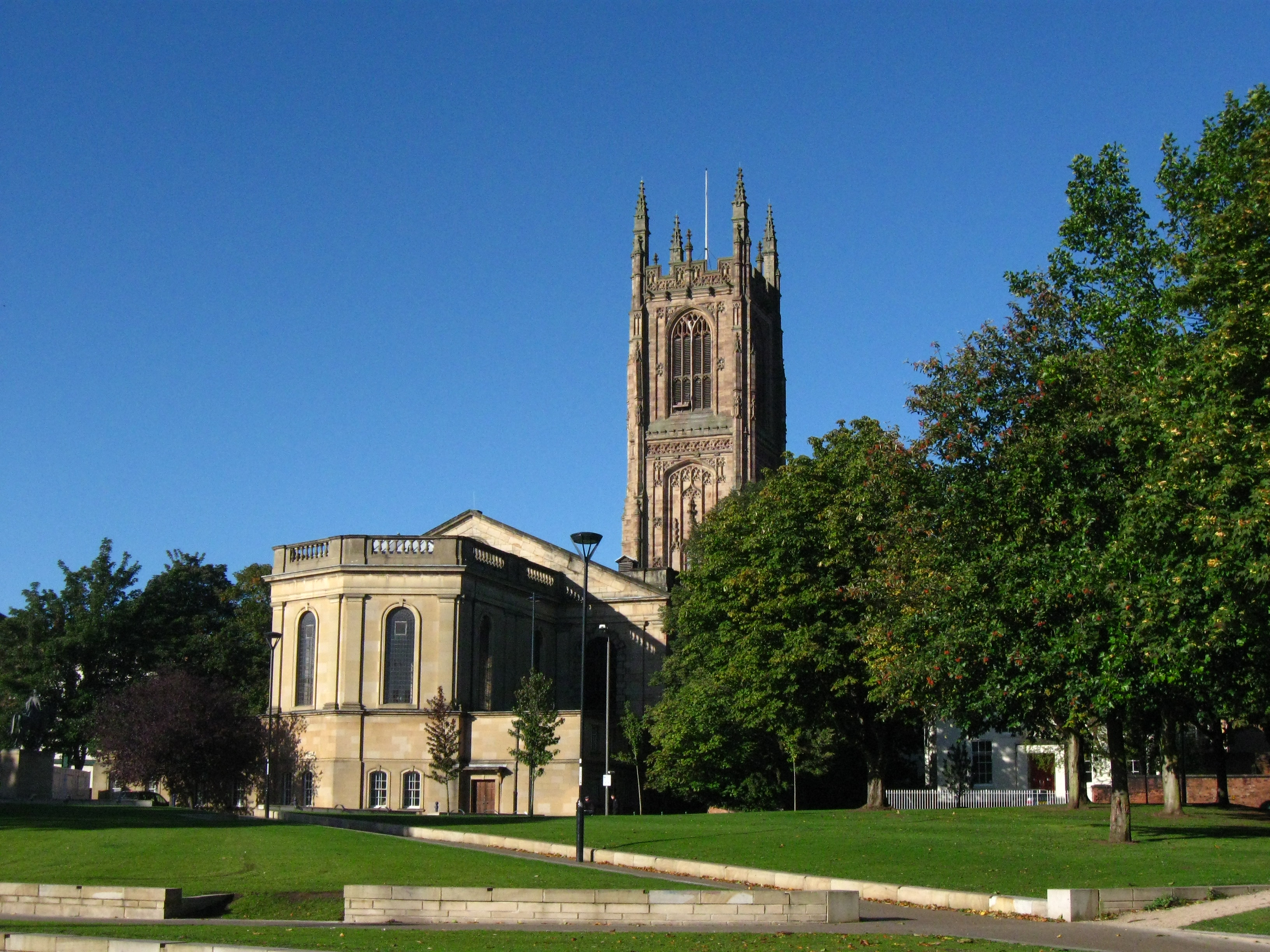
Derby Cathedral, England

The Dean of Derby is the head (primus inter pares – first among equals) and chair of the chapter of canons, the ruling body of Derby Cathedral. The dean and chapter are based at the Cathedral Church of All Saints in Derby. Before 2000 the post was designated as a provost, which was then the equivalent of a dean at most English cathedrals. The cathedral is the mother church of the Diocese of Derby of the Church of England and seat of the Bishop of Derby.

The incumbent dean, since July 2020, is Peter Robinson.

== List of deans ==
=== Provosts ===
- 1931–1937 Herbert Ham
- 1937–1947 Philip Micklem
- 1947–1953 Ronald O'Ferrall
- 1953–1981 Ronald Beddoes
- 1981–1997 Benjamin Lewers
- 21 March 1998 – 17 March 2000 Michael Perham (became Dean)

=== Deans ===
- 17 March 2000 – 2004 Michael Perham (previously Provost)
- 2005 – December 2007 Martin Kitchen
- 13 September 2008 – 31 January 2010 Jeff Cuttell
- 9 October 2010 – 20 November 2016 John Davies
- 2 November 2016 – 30 September 2017: Sue Jones, Acting Dean, and Director of Mission and Ministry
- 30 September 2017 – 30 September 2019: Stephen Hance
- 20 July 2020 – present: Peter Robinson
