= Micklem =

Micklem is a surname. Notable people with the surname include:

- Caryl Micklem (1925–2003), English minister in the Congregational and United Reformed churches, hymn writer and religious broadcaster
- Gerald Micklem (1911–1988), English golfer and golf administrator
- Nathaniel Micklem (politician) (1853–1954), British politician and lawyer
- Nathaniel Micklem (theologian) (1888–1976), British theologian and activist
- Philip Micklem (1876–1965), English Anglican priest
- Robert Micklem (1891–1952), English Royal Navy officer and businessman
- Sarah Micklem, American writer
