= Mangin =

Mangin is a surname. Notable people with the surname include:

- Claude Mangin (1786-1835), French judge
- Charles Mangin (1866–1925), French general
- Edward Mangin (1772–1852), Irish Anglican priest and writer
- Gregory Mangin (1907–1979), American tennis player and Wall Street broker
- Jean-Pierre Mangin (born 1937), French philatelist
- Nicole Girard-Mangin (1878-1919), in World War I became first woman medical doctor to serve in the French Army
- Patrice Mangin, French forensic pathologist
- Robert Mangin (1863–1944), British clergyman
- Sergio Mangín (born 1973), Argentine sprint canoer
- Stuart Mangin (born 1977), Australian rules footballer
- Thorleif Mangin (1896–1950), British colonial administrator

== See also ==
- Mangin mirror, a type of back surface concave mirror
