= Nathaniel Micklem =

Nathaniel Micklem may refer to:

- Nathaniel Micklem (politician) (1853–1954), British Liberal Member of Parliament
- Nathaniel Micklem (theologian) (1888–1976), British theologian, political activist and college principal
