= George Hamilton (archdeacon) =

Irish archdeacon

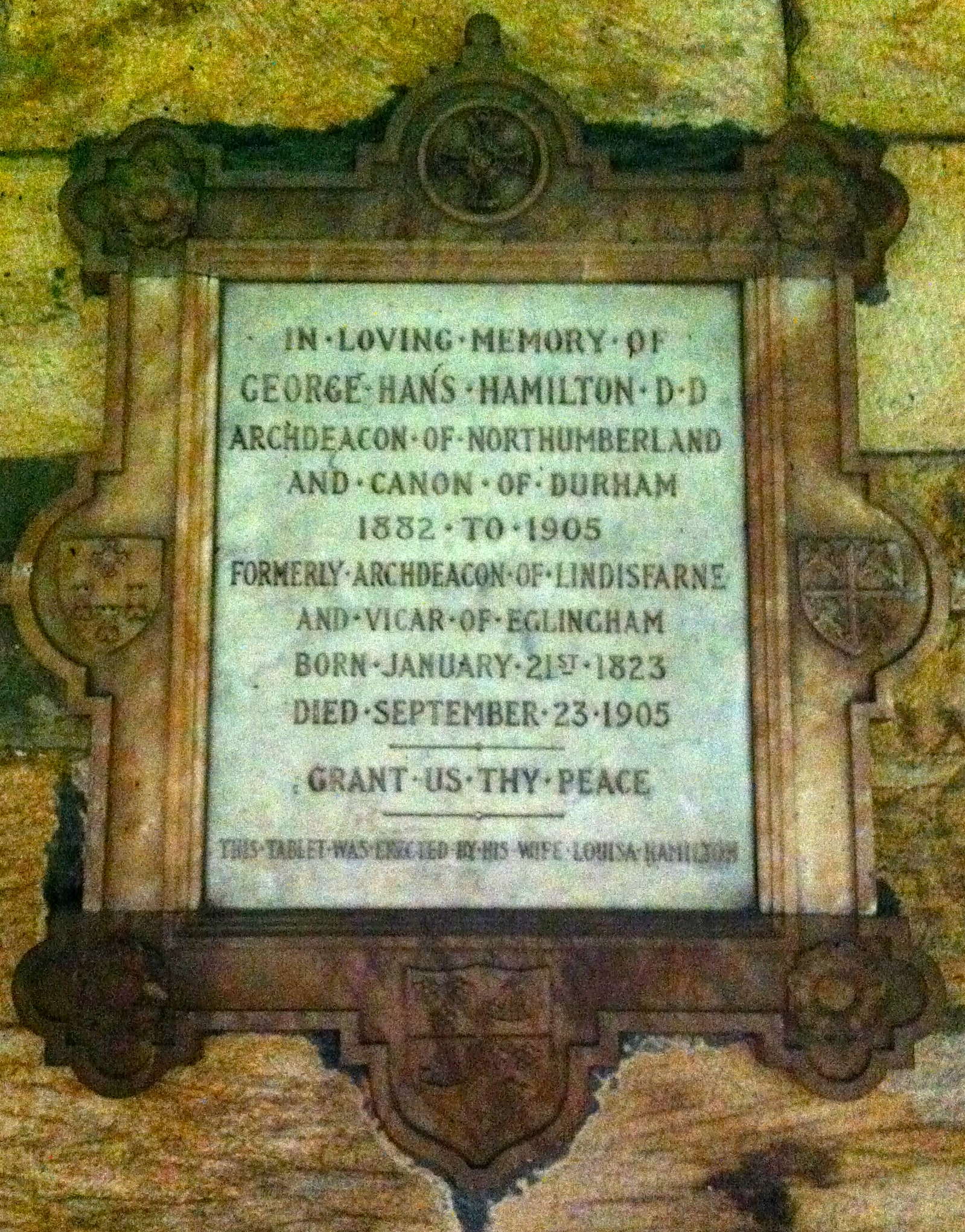
Memorial to George Hans Hamilton in the cloister of Durham Cathedral

George Hans Hamilton was Archdeacon of Lindisfarne from 1865 until 1882, when he became Archdeacon of Northumberland. He was also a Canon of Durham.

Hamilton was the third son of Henry Hamilton, JP of Tullylish and grandson of Hugh Hamilton, Bishop of Clonfert and Kilmacduagh from 1795 to 1799; and then of Ossory until 1805. He was educated at Shrewsbury School and Trinity College, Dublin and ordained in 1847. After a curacy in Sunderland he became Chaplain of Durham Prison then Vicar of Berwick. In 1884 he became Chaplain to the High Sheriff of Durham.

Hamilton married (first) "Bella Best", Arabella Sarah Best, whose father John Best (1791–1825) came from Worcester. He was an accountant with the East India Company in Bombay, and his wife Arabella née Robinson (1795–1855) and children seem to have travelled much between there and Sunderland, where Bella's mother came from. Best died in Bombay aged 33, leaving his widow – possibly in India – four months pregnant, with four other children under the age of ten.

Hamilton's first wife Bella died in January 1868, having produced two sons, Alfred (a black sheep) (born 1849) and Harry (1850–1935), and a daughter, Eliza Arabella Sarah, known as Ella (1858–1919).

A year and a half after the death of his first wife, on 1 June 1869, Hamilton married the Lady Louisa Frances Clemens (1843–1939), who presented him with another daughter and three more sons, the youngest of whom, George (1877–1947) was an English electrical engineer and Conservative Party politician. Hamilton's penultimate son Robert (1871–1901), a refrigeration engineer, was killed aged 30 in an explosion aboard the first refrigerated ship bringing bananas to Britain from the West Indies.

Hamilton was a great advocate of prison reform. His character was drawn upon by Charles Reade in It Is Never Too Late to Mend (1856).

Hamilton died in post on 23 September 1905; and his widow on 31 August 1939.

Church of England titles
Preceded by Richard Charles Coxe	Archdeacon of Lindisfarne; 1865–1882	Succeeded by Henry John Martin
Preceded by Henry William Watkins	Archdeacon of Northumberland; 1882–1905	Succeeded by James Henderson
