= Toby Wright =

Toby Wright may refer to:

- Toby Wright (record producer), American record producer
- Toby Wright (American football) (born 1970), American football player
- Toby Wright (priest) (born 1975), British Anglican priest
