= Nathaniel Micklem (politician) =

British politician (1853–1954)

Nathaniel Micklem circa 1906

Nathaniel Micklem, QC (20 November 1853 – 19 March 1954) was a British Liberal Party politician and lawyer.

== Early life and education ==
Nathaniel Micklem was born at Cookham in Berkshire, the son of solicitor, Thomas Micklem and his first wife, Louisa Deane. He was educated at Lockers Park School in Hertfordshire, Mill Hill School and New College, Oxford where he took a first in Jurisprudence in 1877. In 1880 Micklem was the only student to gain a first in the Bachelor of Civil Law (BCL) examinations. While at Oxford he was president of the Union in 1878 and rowed or coxed for New College for two years. He also studied at University College London, gaining BA and LL.B (Exhibition) degrees before being elected a Fellow there in 1881.

== Law career ==
Also in 1881, Micklem was called to the Bar at Lincoln's Inn. He obtained a large junior practice and took silk in early 1900 becoming Queen's Counsel as Victoria was still on the throne. He was one of only two men to be Queen's Counsel in two reigns as he was still living at the accession to the throne of Queen Elizabeth II in 1952 (the other being Viscount Cecil). He maintained his law practice until 1924 when he retired. He was a Bencher of Lincoln's Inn and acted as Treasurer there in 1930. He was also a member of the Bar Council.

== Politics ==
Micklem was elected Member of Parliament for Watford, also known as Hertfordshire West, at the Liberal landslide election of 1906, the first time a non-Conservative had ever held the seat. At the previous general election in 1900 the Conservative candidate, Frederick Halsey had been unopposed but Micklem defeated Halsey by 7613 votes to 6136, a majority of 1476. However the Unionists regained the seat at the January 1910 general election winning by a majority of 1551. At this election the Unionists had dubbed Micklem a "Radical-Socialist" and despite Micklem claiming to be proud of the description it is likely it hurt him, especially in the strongly Unionist agricultural parts of the division. Micklem stood again at the December 1910 general election reducing the Tory majority but not sufficiently to re-take the seat.

From 1924 he was a member of the Royal Commission on Lunacy and Mental Disorder and succeeded Hugh Macmillan, Baron Macmillan as chairman in 1930. The Macmillan Commission established the framework for the Mental Treatment Act 1930 and eventually led the way to the passing of the Mental Health Act 1959 and later Mental Health Acts. He was a governor of his old school, Mill Hill for over fifty years, and was sometime chairman of the board of governors. A portrait of Micklem by George Harcourt RA was unveiled at the school on Foundation Day in 1932.

== Family ==
In 1885 Micklem married Ellen Ruth Curwen. His wife died in 1952. They had three sons, The eldest - also named Nathaniel - went on to be a professor of theology and principal of Mansfield College, Oxford as well as president of the Liberal Party in 1957–58.

He was the second half-cousin of Leonard Micklem, father of the Very Rev Philip Micklem, Brigadier-General John Micklem DSO MC and Commander Sir Robert Micklem.

== Religion ==
The Micklems were an old Nonconformist family and Micklem was a lifelong Congregationalist. In 1925 he published a book of religious papers and addresses together with his friend Arnold Thomas, who had been Chairman of the Congregational Union in 1899. He died in March 1954 aged 100 years. His funeral service on 25 March 1954 was conducted by his grandson, the Reverend T C Micklem.

In 1946 Micklem had given evidence against the building of the new town of Hemel Hempstead, calling the idea a desecration. His home at Northridge House had to be demolished to make way for the new town development of Warner's End. Because of his long connection with the area however a local school, Micklem Primary School in Warners End, was named after him. It was opened in 1958 by his son Nathaniel.

== Arms ==
Coat of arms of Nathaniel Micklem
Motto In Quo Corriget

Parliament of the United Kingdom
Preceded by Frederick Halsey	Member of Parliament for Watford; 1906 – Jan 1910	Succeeded by Arnold Ward
