= Henry Martin (priest) =

Archdeacon of Lindisfarne

Henry John Martin (1830-1903) was Archdeacon of Lindisfarne from 1882 until his death.

Martin was born in South Devon and educated King's College School and Trinity College, Cambridge. He was ordained by the Bishop of Oxford in 1855 and began his ecclesiastical career with curacies in Shirburn and Exeter. After this he was association secretary of the Church Missionary Society from 1862 to 1866 when he became Vicar of West Hartlepool. In 1871 he became Vicar of Newcastle-upon-Tyne where he stayed for eleven years until his Archdeacon’s appointment.

Church of England titles
Preceded by George Hans Hamilton	Archdeacon of Lindisfarne; 1882–1903	Succeeded by Henry Bernard Hodgson
