= Archdeacon of Lindisfarne =

Church of England ecclesiastical office

The Archdeacon of Lindisfarne is a senior ecclesiastical officer in the diocese of Newcastle of the Church of England.

== History ==
The archdeaconry was formed by Order in Council on 2 September 1842 from part of the Diocese of Durham archdeaconry of Northumberland; on 23 May 1882, the Diocese of Newcastle was created from those two archdeaconries. From 1842 to 2008, the Archdeaconry of Lindisfarne covered the deaneries of Morpeth, Alnwick, Bamburgh and Glendale, and Norham, and in 2008 this was extended to include Corbridge, Hexham and Bellingham. In 2008, the role of Archdeacon of Lindisfarne became a full-time position for the first time in many years.

== List of archdeacons ==
- 15 September 1842 – 3 April 1844 (d.): Edward Bigge
- 7 May 1844 – 1853 (res.): George Bland
- 2 April 1853 – 25 August 1865 (d.): Richard Coxe
- 1865–1882 (res.): George Hamilton

The archdeaconry has been in Newcastle diocese since the diocese's creation in 1882.

- 1882–1903: Henry Martin
- 1904–1914 (res.): Henry Hodgson
- 1914–14 February 1924 (d.): George Ormsby
- 1924–27 June 1944 (d.): Robert Mangin
- 1944–1955 (ret.): Thomas Forman
- 1956–24 December 1959 (d.): Wilfrid Pawson
- 1960–3 August 1969 (d.): Leonard Hawkes
- 1970–14 December 1980 (d.): Harry Bates
- 1981–1987 (res.): David Smith
- 1987–2000 (ret.): Michael Bowering
- 2001–2007 (ret.): Robert Langley (afterwards archdeacon emeritus)
- 9 March 2008 – 20 July 2020: Peter Robinson (became Dean of Derby)
- 14 November 2020 – present: Catherine Sourbut Groves

== Sources ==
- Horn, Joyce M.; Smith, David M.; Mussett, Patrick (2004), Fasti Ecclesiae Anglicanae 1541–1857, vol. 11, p. 86
