= Charles Johnston (priest) =

Charles Francis Harding Johnston (b Barnstaple, 6 October 1842 -d Warrington 22 August 1925) was Archdeacon of Bombay from 1888 until 1890.

Johnston was educated at Barnstaple Grammar School and Christ's College, Cambridge; and ordained in 1867. His first post after Graduation was with the Inland Revenue after which he was a master at Trinity College, Glenalmond from 1867 to 1868. Moving to India he was Chaplain of HEICS and Domestic Chaplain to the Bishop of Bombay before his time as Archdeacon and Vicar of Headington Quarry afterwards.
