= Leonard Hawkes (priest) =

British archdeacon (1907–1969)

Leonard Stephen Hawkes (5 October 1907 – 3 August 1969) was Archdeacon of Lindisfarne from 1960 until his death.

Hawkes was educated at Oakham School and Emmanuel College, Cambridge. He was ordained in 1932 after studying at Ripon College Cuddesdon; and began his ecclesiastical career as a curate at St Andrew, Catford. He was Vice-Principal of Dorchester Missionary College then served a further curacy of St John Divine, Kennington. Following this he was Vice-Principal of Dorchester Missionary College then Curate of St John Divine, Kennington, 1938–46. He was a Chaplain to the Forces with the TA from 1939 to 1957. He was Vicar of Oxton then Rector of Bletchingley until his Archdeacon’s appointment

Church of England titles
Preceded by Wilfrid Denys Pawson	Archdeacon of Lindisfarne; 1960–1969	Succeeded by Mansel Harry Bates
