= Benjamin Lewers =

Benjamin Hugh Lewers (25 March 1932 – 25 March 2015) was an Anglican priest in the second half of the 20th century.

Lewers was born on 25 March 1932, educated at Sherborne School and Selwyn College, Cambridge, and ordained in 1962. After a curacy at St Mary, Northampton he was Priest in charge of the Church of the Good Shepherd, Hounslow. From 1968 to 1975 he was an industrial chaplain at Heathrow Airport. After a further incumbency at Newark he was appointed the fifth Provost of Derby Cathedral in 1981. He resigned in 1997 and lived in Marshwood, Dorset, where for many years he assisted at the local church, St Mary the Virgin.

Lewers died on 25 March 2015.

Church of England titles
Preceded by Ronald Alfred Beddoes	Provost of Derby; 1981 – 1997	Succeeded by Michael Francis Perham
