= Harry Bates (priest) =

Mansel Harry Bates (4 August 1912 – 14 December 1980) was Archdeacon of Lindisfarne from 1970 until his death.

Bates was educated at the Liverpool Institute and Brasenose College, Oxford. He was ordained in 1936 after studying at Wycliffe Hall, Oxford; and began his ecclesiastical career as a curate at SS John and James, Litherland. After this he was Curate in Charge of Netherton and then held incumbencies in [Everton, Liverpool|Everton] and was appointed vicar of St Lukes Crosby thenJesmond until his Archdeacon’s appointment.

Church of England titles
Preceded by Leonard Stephen Hawkes	Archdeacon of Lindisfarne; 1970–1980	Succeeded by David James Smith
