= Thorleif Mangin =

British colonial administrator (1896-1950)

Sir Thorleif Rattray Orde Mangin, CMG (27 September 1896 – 29 September 1950) was a British colonial administrator. He was Chief Commissioner of Gold Coast Colony from 1945 until his death.

The son of the Venerable R. R. Mangin, Archdeacon of Lindisfarne, Thorleif Mangin was educated at Marlborough College. After serving as sub-lieutenant in the Royal Naval Volunteer Reserve during the First World War, he joined the Colonial Service in 1919.
