= Peter Robinson (priest) =

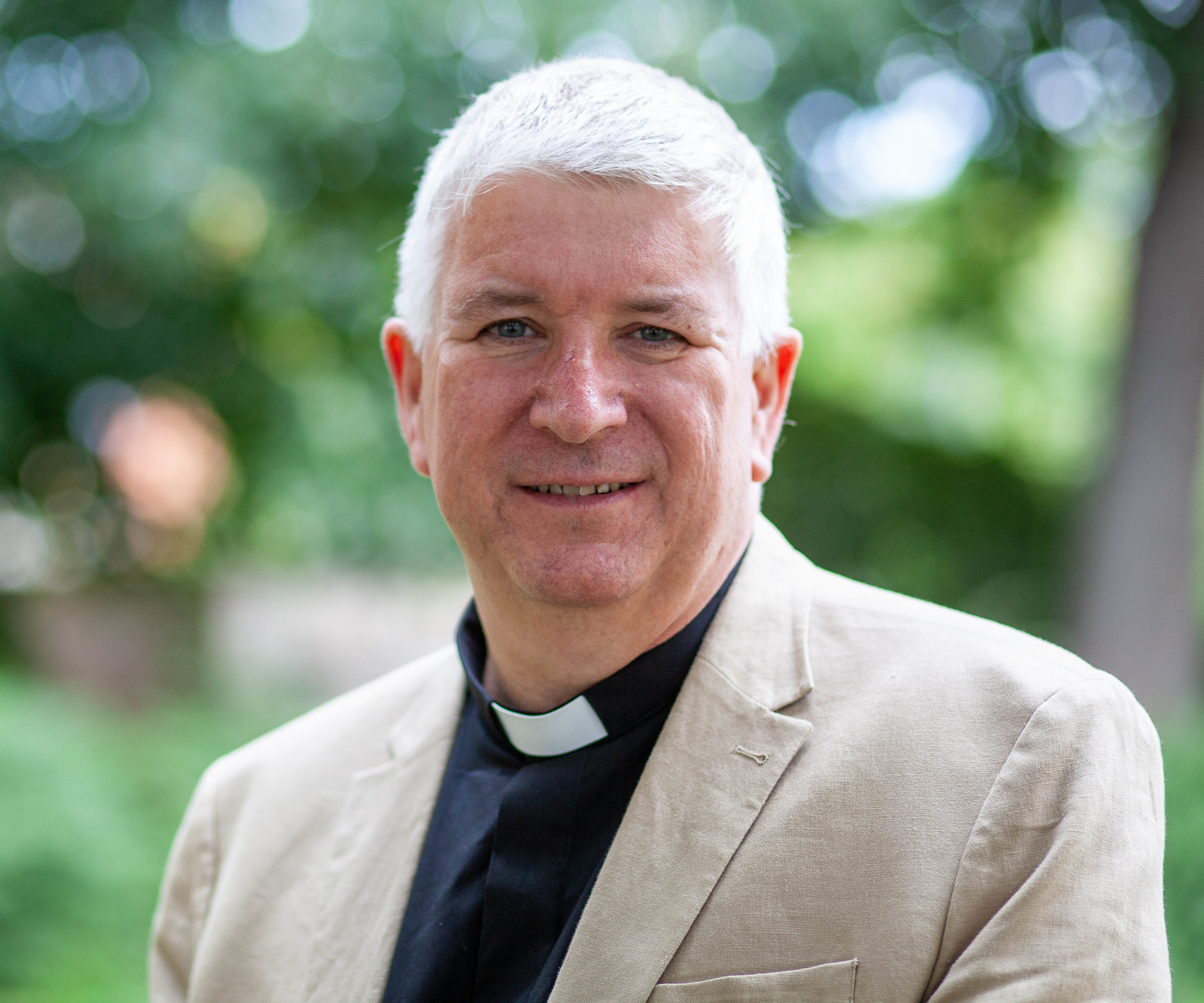
The Very Reverend Peter Robinson

Peter John Alan Robinson is an Anglican priest serving as the Dean of Derby; he was previously Archdeacon of Lindisfarne.

Born in 1961, he was educated at Tiffin Boys' Grammar School, Kingston-upon-Thames, and St John's College, Cambridge, and worked in the oil industry before being ordained in 1996. After a curacy in North Shields he worked with the Urban Ministry and Theology Project in Byker until his archidiaconal appointment.

Robinson was installed as Dean of Derby on 20 July 2020.

Church of England titles
| Preceded by Bob Langley | Archdeacon of Lindisfarne; 2008–2020 | Succeeded by Catherine Sourbut Groves |
| Preceded by Stephen Hance | Dean of Derby; 2020–present | Incumbent |
