= Robert Langley =

British Archdeacon (born 1937)

The Venerable Robert Langley
- Born: October 25, 1937 (age 88)
- Education: Worksop College
- Alma mater: St Catherine's College, Oxford
- Occupation: Anglican priest
- Known for: Archdeacon of Lindisfarne (2001–2007)

The Venerable Robert Langley (born 25 October 1937) was Archdeacon of Lindisfarne from 2001 until 2007.

Born on 25 October 1937, he was educated at Worksop College and St Catherine's College, Oxford and ordained in 1964. He was a curate at Aston cum Aughton, Sheffield from 1963 to 1968; secretary of the Christian Education Movement from 1968 to 1974; principal of Ian Ramsay College, Brasted from 1974 to 1977; head of the St Albans Diocese Ministerial Training Scheme from 1977 to 85; canon missioner for the Newcastle Diocese from 1985 to 1998; and then director of Ministry and Training in the same diocese until his appointment as an archdeacon.

Church of England titles
Preceded by Michael Bowering	Archdeacon of Lindisfarne; 2001–2007	Succeeded by Peter John Alan Robinson
