= W. N. Hodgson =

English poet of the First World War

W. N. Hodgson MC
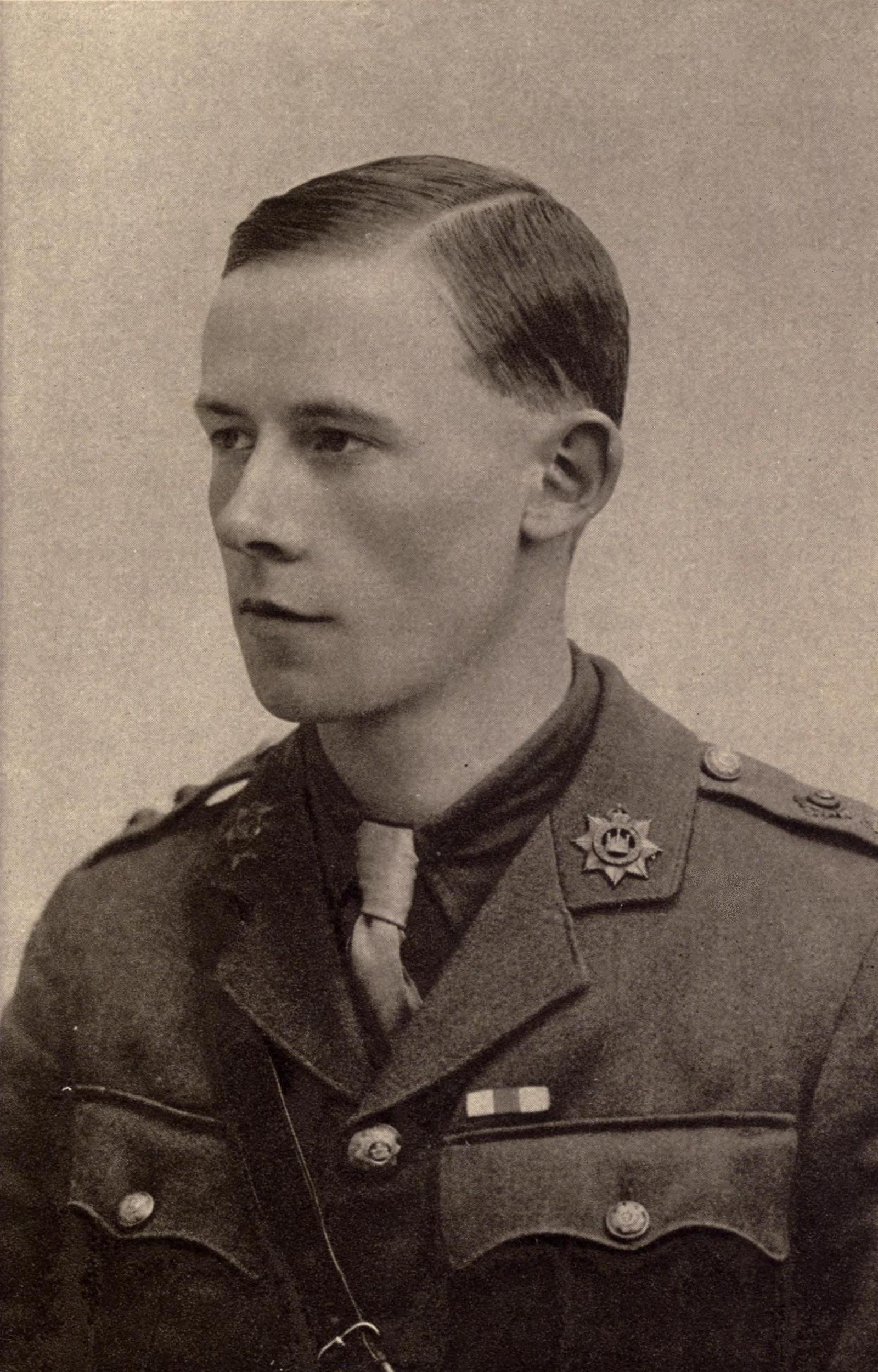
- Hodgson in uniform c. 1915
- Born: William Noel Hodgson; 3 January 1893; Thornbury, Gloucestershire, England
- Died: 1 July 1916 (aged 23) near Mametz, Somme, France
- Resting place: Devonshire Cemetery, Picardy, France
- Education: Durham School
- Alma mater: Christ Church, Oxford
- Occupations: Soldier and poet
- Military career
- Allegiance: United Kingdom
- Branch: British Army
- Service years: 1914–1916
- Rank: Lieutenant
- Unit: Devonshire Regiment
- Conflicts: World War I: Battle of Loos; Battle of the Somme; First day on the Somme †
- Awards: Mentioned in Despatches; Military Cross

William Noel Hodgson MC (3 January 1893 – 1 July 1916) was an English poet and soldier. During the First World War, he published stories and poems under the pen name Edward Melbourne.

== Early life and education ==
Hodgson was the fourth and youngest child of Henry Bernard Hodgson, the first Bishop of Saint Edmundsbury and Ipswich. He was born at Thornbury, near Bristol, but the family soon moved to Berwick-upon-Tweed. He entered into The School House of Durham School in September 1905 on a King's Scholarship. He steered in the second crew in 1907; was in the XI, 1910, 1911; and in the XV, 1910. He won the Steeplechase in 1909 and 1911. He left Durham in July 1911, with Gallipoli war poet and friend Nowell Oxland, for Oxford University where he was an exhibitioner of Christ Church. He took a first in Classical Moderations in March 1913 and decided to stay and do Greats.

== First World War ==
Known as "Smiler" to his friends, he volunteered for the British Army on the outbreak of the First World War in 1914 and, after being commissioned in September, served in the 9th Battalion of the Devonshire Regiment. For the first year of the War he was training in England, before landing at Le Havre on 28 July 1915 and being sent to trenches near Festubert. His first major offensive came on 25 September during the Battle of Loos. He was mentioned in dispatches and awarded the Military Cross for holding a captured trench for 36 hours without reinforcements or supplies during the battle, and he was subsequently promoted to lieutenant.

Having returned to England after the Battle of Loos, he was positioned with his battalion (now part of the 7th Division) in the front-line trenches at Fricourt in February 1916, before moving a kilometre or so to the trenches opposite the town of Mametz in April. The trench was named Mansell Copse, as it was in a group of trees. He was killed on the first day of the Battle of the Somme when attacking German trenches near Mametz. He was bombing officer for his battalion during the attack, and was killed by a machine gun positioned at a shrine whilst taking grenades to the men in the newly captured trenches. The bullet went through his neck, killing him instantly. His servant was found next to him after the offensive had ended. He is buried in Grave 3, Row A at Devonshire Cemetery in Mansell Copse.

== Writings ==
Although he had been writing poetry since at least 1913, he started publishing stories and poems in periodicals at the beginning of 1916, under the pen name Edward Melbourne.

Hodgson's posthumous volume Verse and Prose in Peace and War, published in London by Murray in 1917, ran into three editions. He is probably best remembered today for his poem 'Before Action', which was published two days before he died. It is a commonly held belief that the poem was written with the premonition of his death, from his knowledge of the German machine gun positions; the last line is "Help me to die, O Lord".

=== "Before Action" ===
By all the glories of the day
And the cool evening's benison
By that last sunset touch that lay
Upon the hills when day was done,
By beauty lavishly outpoured
And blessings carelessly received,
By all the days that I have lived
Make me a soldier, Lord.

I, that on my familiar hill
Saw with uncomprehending eyes
A hundred of thy sunsets spill
Their fresh and sanguine sacrifice,
Ere the sun swings his noonday sword
Must say good-bye to all of this; –
By all delights that I shall miss,
Help me to die, O Lord.

Published in "The New Witness" on 29 June 1916, just two days before his death. The text is a poem that explores themes of human experience, including hope, fear, joy, sorrow, and mortality, and ends with a prayer-like invocation.

== Books about W. N. Hodgson ==
Before Action: William Noel Hodgson and the 9th Devons – A Story of the Great War – http://www.w-n-hodgson.info/
