= The Park Community School =

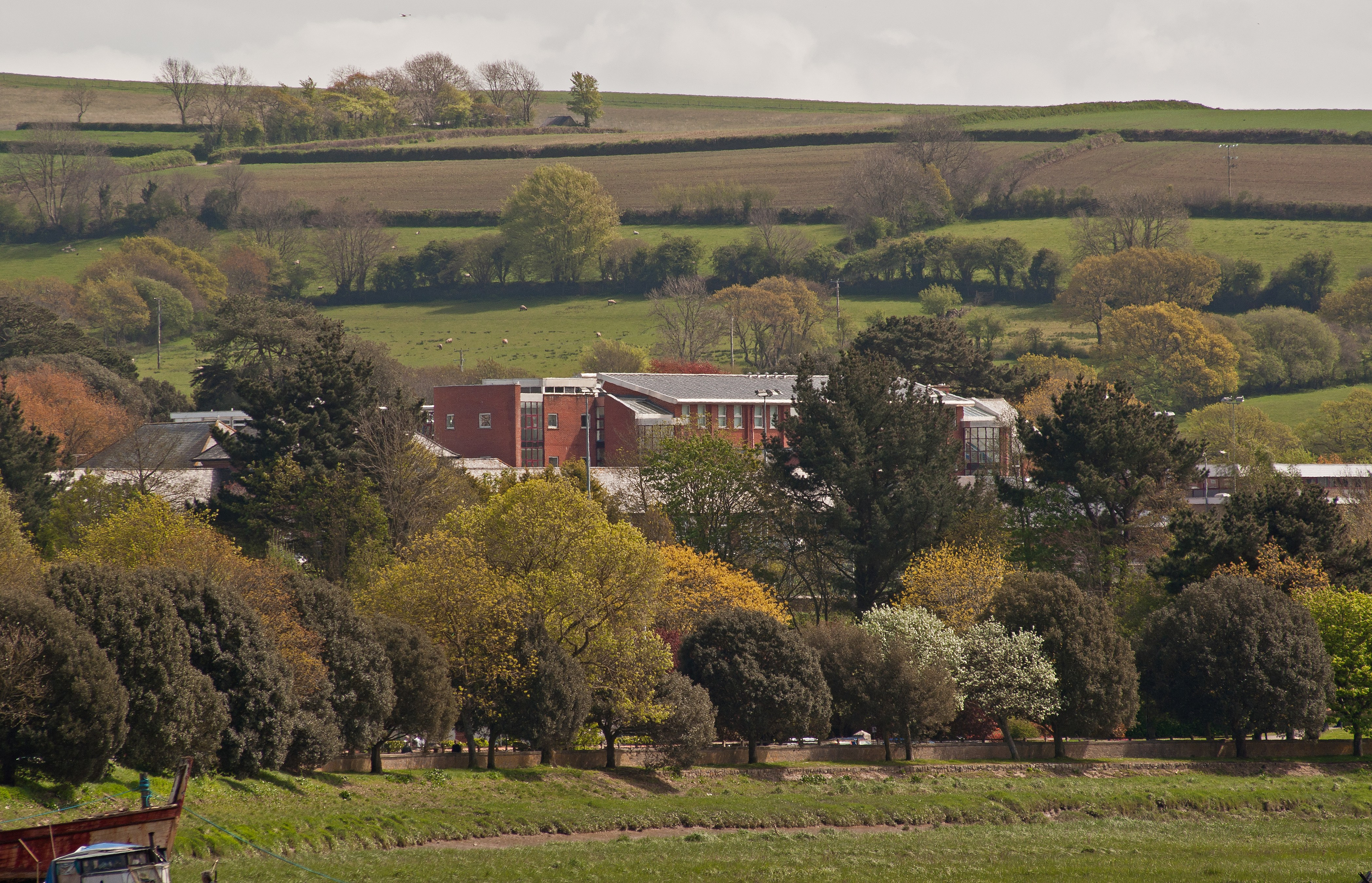

Location
- Park Lane; Barnstaple, Devon, EX32 9AX; England; 51.06956°N 4.05031°W

Information
- Type: Academy
- Motto: Sic Nos Non Nobis
- Local authority: Devon County Council
- Trust: Tarka Learning Partnership
- Department for Education URN: 146094 Tables
- Head Teacher: Vicky Owen
- Gender: Coeducational
- Age: 11 to 16
- Enrolment: 1,408
- Houses: Kingsley, Drake, Raleigh, Fortescue, Chichester
- Website: www.theparkschool.org.uk

The Park Community School is a coeducational secondary school located in Barnstaple, Devon, England.

== History ==
The school was founded in 1910 as Barnstaple Grammar School, and was the first secondary school to be built by Devon County Council, educating the youth of much of North Devon. The school's name was changed to The Park School in 1973 when the school became a comprehensive.

From 2002 to 2003 the school underwent extensive remodelling with a new maths and science building linking the old North and South Buildings, and a new food hall was also built whilst many of the old classrooms were redesigned and refurbished.

Previously a foundation school administered by Devon County Council, in February 2019 The Park Community School converted to academy status. The school is now sponsored by the Tarka Learning Partnership.

== Notable former pupils ==
Barnstaple Grammar School

- Michael Bowering, archdeacon
- Ann Cleeves, novelist
- Jonathan Hanmer (1606–1687), minister
- Nicholas Hooper (1654–1731), lawyer and member of parliament
- Charles Johnston (priest)
- John Johnston (priest)
- Thomas Lee (1794–1834), architect
- Gervase Frederick Mathew, naval officer and entomologist
- Cuthbert Mayne, martyr
- David Shepherd (umpire)
- David Spiegelhalter, statistician
- David Vine, commentator
