= Wilfrid Pawson =

Wilfrid Denys Pawson (26 November 1905 – 24 December 1959) was Archdeacon of Lindisfarne from 1956 until his death.

Pawson was educated at Osborne, Dartmouth, and Jesus College, Cambridge. After a curacy at St Mary's, Barnsley he held incumbencies in Dodworth, Heckmondwike, Brighouse, Broughty Ferry and Eglingham.

Church of England titles
Preceded by Thomas Pears Gordon Foreman	Archdeacon of Lindisfarne; 1956–1959	Succeeded by Leonard Stephen Hawkes
