= Michael Bowering =

Michael Ernest Bowering (25 June 1935 – 25 April 2015) was Archdeacon of Lindisfarne from 1987 until 2000.

Bowering was educated at Barnstaple Grammar School; Kelham Theological College; and York St John University College. After curacies in Middlesbrough and New Earswick he held incumbencies at Brayton and Saltburn by the Sea. He was a Canon Residentiary at York Minster from 1981 to 1987.

== Notes ==
Church of England titles
Preceded by David James Smith	Archdeacon of Lindisfarne; 1987–2000	Succeeded by Robert Langley
