= Richard Lewis (priest) =

British priest (1935–2022)

Richard Lewis (24 December 1935 – 10 June 2022) was the Dean of Wells from 1990 to 2003.

Lewis was educated at the Royal Masonic School for Boys and Fitzwilliam College, Cambridge. Ordained in 1960 he began his ecclesiastical career with a curacy in Hinckley following which he was Priest in charge of St Edmund, Riddlesdown. He then held incumbencies in South Merstham, Wimbledon and Dulwich before his elevation to the Deanery.

Lewis died on 10 June 2022, at the age of 86.

Church of England titles
Preceded by Patrick Mitchell	Dean of Wells; 1990–2003	Succeeded by John Clarke
