= Herbert Ham =

Herbert Ham was an Anglican priest and musician.

He was born in 1869, educated at Worcester College, Oxford and ordained in 1898. Following curacies in Wormley and Chelmsford he held incumbencies in Derby, Wirksworth and Carsington after which he was appointed to All Saints Cathedral Church, Derby; and in due, course when it became a cathedral, its first Provost. He retired in 1937 and died on 2 December 1964.

Church of England titles
Preceded by Inaugural appointment	Provost of Derby; 1931–1937	Succeeded by Philip Arthur Micklem
