= Devonshire Cemetery =

WWI CWGC burial site in Pas-de-Calais, France

- Commonwealth War Graves Commission
- Used for those deceased July 1916
- Location: 49°59′19″N 2°44′08″E near Albert, Picardy, France
- Designed by: W H Cowlishaw
- Total burials: 163
- Unknowns: 10

Burials by nation
- United Kingdom: 163

Burials by war
- World War I: 163

Devonshire Cemetery is a small Commonwealth War Graves Commission (CWGC) burial site for some of the British Empire and Commonwealth troops killed during the Battle of the Somme. It is located near to the village of Mametz. The cemetery grounds were assigned to the British Empire in perpetuity by the French state in recognition of the sacrifices made by the Allies in the defence of France during the First World War.

All but two of the graves in the cemetery are of men from the 8th and 9th Battalions of the Devonshire Regiment.

== Foundation and development of the cemetery ==
The cemetery was established on 4 July 1916, employing a section of the old front-line trench in Mansel Copse. This ground had originally been held by troops of the 9th Devons before the attack towards the German positions in Mametz on 1 July. Casualties were extremely heavy. After the attack a wooden board was erected close to the mass grave with the legend, 'The Devonshires held this trench, the Devonshires hold it still'. The same inscription is now to be found on the stone memorial tablet unveiled in 1986.

After the war, the architect W. H. Cowlishaw was commissioned to submit a design for a permanent site.

== Notable graves ==
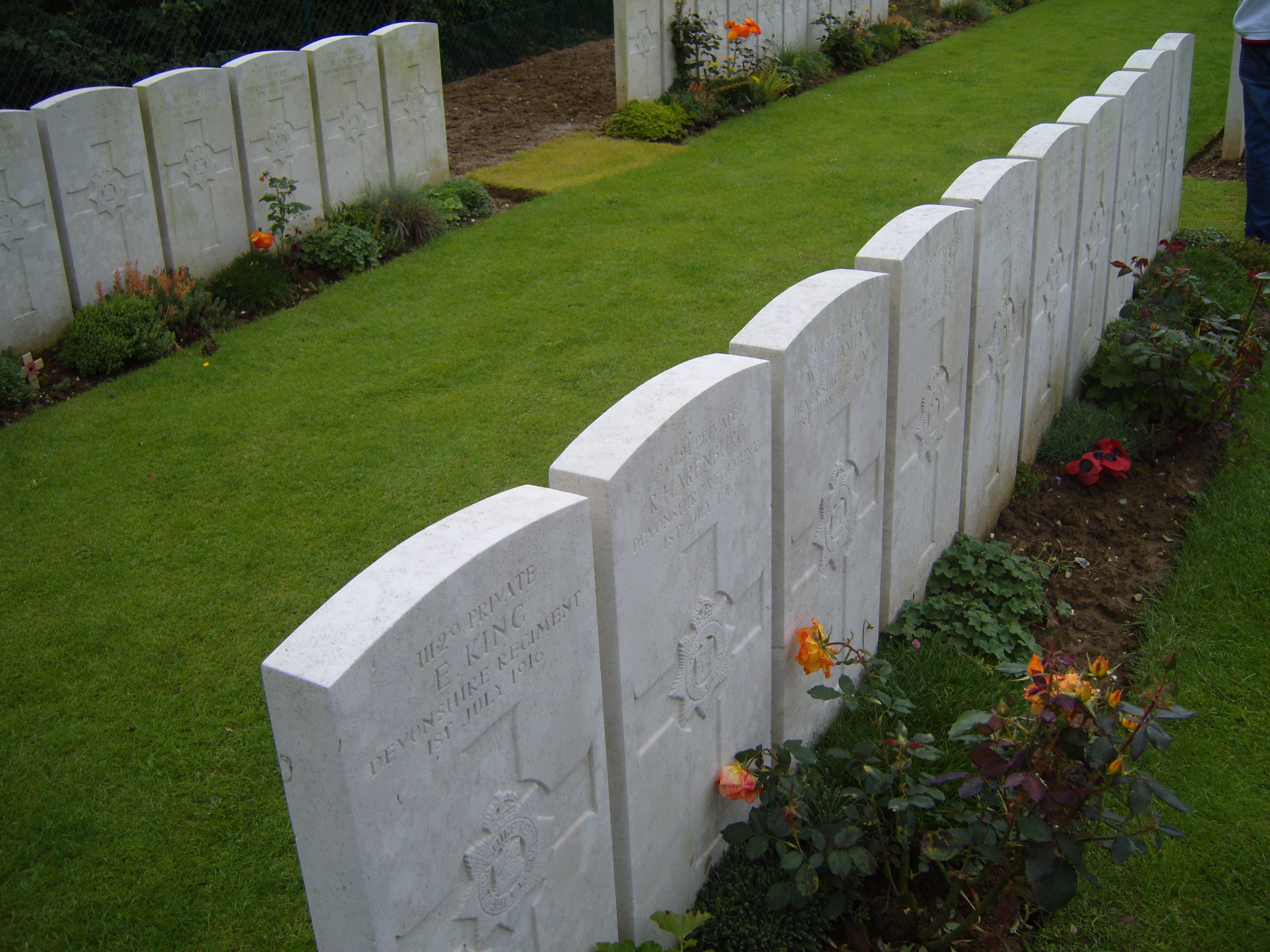
Gravestones at the Devonshire Cemetery

The cemetery contains the graves of 163 soldiers. Lieutenant William Noel Hodgson MC, a war poet, is buried here.
