= Martin Kitchen (priest) =

Martin Kitchen (born 18 May 1947) was Dean of Derby from 2005 until 2007.

He was born on 18 May 1947; educated at Sir Walter St John's Grammar School For Boys and the Polytechnic of North London, before training for the priesthood at King's College London and the Southwark Ordination Course and being ordained in 1980. He was a Lecturer at the Church Army Training College, and Curate at St James, Kidbrooke from 1979 to 1983 when he became Chaplain of Manchester Polytechnic and Team Vicar of Whitworth, Manchester. He was Advisor for Training for the Diocese of Southwark and a Residentiary Canon at Southwark Cathedral from 1988 to 1997; and then a Residentiary Canon at Durham Cathedral from then until 2004 (Vice Dean from 1999 to 2004).

Church of England titles
| Preceded by Michael Perham | Dean of Derby; 2005–2007 | Succeeded by Jeff Cuttell |
