= John Davies (priest, born 1957) =

British Anglican priest and theologian

The Very Reverend John Davies DL
- Dean of Wells
- Church: Church of England
- Diocese: Bath and Wells
- In office: November 2016 – January 2023
- Predecessor: John Clarke
- Other post: Dean of Derby (2010–2016)

Orders
- Ordination: 1984 (deacon); 1985 (priest)

Personal details
- Born: John Harverd Davies; 29 November 1957 (age 68) Bolton, England
- Denomination: Anglicanism
- Education: Keble College, Oxford; Corpus Christi College, Cambridge; Westcott House, Cambridge; Lancaster University

John Harverd Davies DL (born 29 November 1957) is a British Anglican priest and theologian. From 2016 to 2023, he was the Dean of Wells, the priest first-among-equals at Wells Cathedral and the most senior priest in the Diocese of Bath and Wells. He had previously served as Dean of Derby from 2010 to 2016.

== Early life and education ==
Davies was born on 29 November 1957 in Bolton, Lancashire, England. He was educated at Brentwood School, a private school in Brentwood, Essex. He studied at Keble College, Oxford, and graduated with a Bachelor of Arts (BA) degree in 1980; as per tradition, his BA was promoted to a Master of Arts (MA Oxon) degree in 1984. He then undertook postgraduate studies at Corpus Christi College, Cambridge, and graduated with Master of Philosophy (MPhil) degree in 1982. In 1982, he entered Westcott House, Cambridge, an Anglican theological college in the Liberal Catholic tradition, to train for two years in preparation for ordination. He later undertook postgraduate research and completed a Doctor of Philosophy (PhD) degree at Lancaster University. His thesis was titled "Divine kenosis and the power of the Church".

== Ordained ministry ==
Davies was ordained in the Church of England as a deacon in 1984 and as a priest in 1985. From 1984 to 1987, he served his curacy at Church of Our Lady and Saint Nicholas, Liverpool in the Diocese of Liverpool. Then, between 1987 and 1990, he was an assistant curate at St John the Baptist Church, Peterborough, in the Diocese of Peterborough. He was also a Minor Canon of Peterborough Cathedral from 1988 to 1990. He then returned to the diocese of Liverpool, where he was Vicar of St Margaret, Anfield from 1990 to 1994.

In 1994, Davies returned to Keble College, Oxford, where he had studied for his undergraduate degree, as its chaplain and Director of Studies in theology. As such, he was also elected a Fellow of the College. Then, from 1999 to 2010, he was Vicar of St Michael with St Mary's Church, Melbourne, Derbyshire in the Diocese of Derby. He was also Diocesan Director of Ordinands from 2000 to 2009, and Priest in Charge of the Benefice of Ticknall (consisting of St George's Church, Ticknall, St James' Church, Smisby, and St Michael's Church, Stanton by Bridge) from 2007 to 2010. In 2010, he was made an honorary canon of Derby Cathedral.

=== As dean ===
On 9 October 2010, Davies was instituted Dean of Derby; as such, he was first-among-equals in the chapter of canons of Derby Cathedral and the most senior priest in the Diocese of Derby. In 2012, Davies undertook a sponsored abseil from the tower of Derby Cathedral to raise funds, both for the Cathedral and for the Padley Centre, a local charity providing help and support to the homeless and other socially disadvantaged people.

On 23 August 2016, it was announced that Davies would be the next Dean of Wells in the Diocese of Bath and Wells. He presided at his last service at Derby Cathedral on 1 November 2016. On 20 November 2016, he was installed as Dean during a service at Wells Cathedral. His last service at the cathedral was the Feast of Candlemas on 2 February 2023, and he retired as dean on 6 January.

== Honours ==
On 1 June 2011, Davies was appointed a Deputy Lieutenant (DL) to the Lord Lieutenant of Derbyshire.

Church of England titles
Preceded by Jeff Cuttell	Dean of Derby; 2010–2016	Succeeded by Stephen Hance
Preceded by John Clarke	Dean of Wells; 2016–2023	Succeeded by Toby Wright
