= Leonard Micklem =

English cricketer

Personal information
- Full name: Leonard Micklem
- Born: 12 March 1845; Henley-on-Thames, Oxfordshire, England
- Died: 7 July 1919 (aged 74); Elstree, Hertfordshire, England
- Batting: Right-handed

Domestic team information
- Years: Team
- 1869: Marylebone Cricket Club

Career statistics
Competition	First-class
Matches	1
Runs scored	9
Batting average	9.00
100s/50s	–/–
Top score	9
Catches/stumpings	–/–
- Source: Cricinfo, 31 October 2021

Leonard Micklem (12 March 1845 — 7 July 1919) was an English first-class cricketer and railway secretary.

== Life ==
The son of Nathaniel Micklem, he was born in March 1845 at Henley-on-Thames. The Micklem's were an old Nonconformist family. He was educated at Eton College, before going up to Merton College, Oxford. He played first-class cricket for the Marylebone Cricket Club (MCC) against Oxford University Cricket Club at Oxford in 1869. Batting once in the match, he was dismissed for 9 runs in the MCC first innings by Bernard Pauncefote. As a cricketer he was described by Wisden while playing school cricket for Eton as "a good and sure bat, playing in splendid form; a great punisher of loose bowling; a brilliant field at long-leg, a fine thrower and safe catch." Micklem was a prominent figure in the Brazilian railway industry, being elected secretary to the Bahia and San Francisco Railway Company in March 1880. He died at Elstree in July 1919.

== Family ==
From his first marriage to Dora Emily Weguelin, Micklem had as son the clergyman Philip Micklem,. Another son, from his second marriage to Nanette Fenwick, was Robert Micklem, a Commander in the Royal Navy.
