= Thomas Forman (priest) =

Thomas Pears Gordon Forman (27 January 1885 – 22 November 1965) was Archdeacon of Lindisfarne from 1944 until 1955.

Forman was born in Repton, Derbyshire, and educated at Shrewsbury and Pembroke College, Cambridge. After a curacy at Kenilworth he was an Assistant Master at his old school until wartime service as a Temporary Chaplain to the Forces. Following a further curacy in York he was Chaplain to the Duke of Portland until 1924. After this he was Rector of Bothal for twenty years until his Archdeacon’s appointment.

Church of England titles
Preceded by Robert Rattray Mangin	Archdeacon of Lindisfarne; 1944–1955	Succeeded by Wilfrid Denys Pawson
