= John Clarke (dean of Wells) =

Dean of Wells, born 1952

The Very Reverend John Clarke
- Dean of Wells
- Church: Church of England
- Diocese: Bath and Wells
- In office: 2004 to 2015
- Predecessor: Richard Lewis
- Successor: John Davies

Orders
- Ordination: 1976 (deacon); 1977 (priest)

Personal details
- Born: John Martin Clarke; 20 February 1952 (age 74)
- Denomination: Anglicanism

John Martin Clarke (born 20 February 1952) is a retired Anglican priest. He was the Dean of Wells from 2004 until his retirement on 31 December 2015.

== Early life and education ==
Clarke was born on 20 February 1952 and educated at West Buckland School, a private school in West Buckland, Devon. In 1973, he entered Edinburgh Theological College, an Anglican theological college in Edinburgh. During this time, he also studied at the University of Edinburgh, and he graduated with a Bachelor of Divinity (BD) degree in 1976. He studied at Hertford College, Oxford and Edinburgh University.

== Ordained ministry ==
Clarke was ordained in the Church of England as a deacon in 1976 and as a priest in 1977. His career began with a curacy at The Ascension, Kenton, Newcastle, after which he was precentor of St Ninian's Cathedral, Perth, then the information officer and communications advisor to the General Synod of the Scottish Episcopal Church. From 1989 to 1996 he was vicar of St Mary, Battersea, then principal of Ripon College Cuddesdon and finally (before his appointment to the deanery) a residentiary canon at Lincoln Cathedral.

As part of his duties as dean of Wells Cathedral he is also chairman of the governors at Wells Cathedral School.

Since 2011, Clarke has been one of the Church Commissioners, the body which manages the assets of the Church of England.

Church of England titles
Preceded by Richard Lewis	Dean of Wells; 2004–2015	Succeeded by John Davies
