= Jeff Cuttell =

Jeffrey Charles Cuttell (born 1959) is a British Anglican priest. He was Dean of Derby from 2007 until 2010.

== Biography ==
He was born in 1959 in Giltbrook, Nottinghamshire, England. He educated at the University of Birmingham and Trinity College, Bristol. He was ordained in 1988. His first post was in Normanton, West Yorkshire after which he was a producer and presenter for BBC religious programmes. He was Rector of Astbury with Smallwood immediately before his time as Dean; and Chaplain at HM Prison Werrington afterwards.

Church of England titles
Preceded by Martin Kitchen	Dean of Derby; 2007 –2010	Succeeded by John Davies
