= Ronald Beddoes =

British Anglican priest (1912–2000)

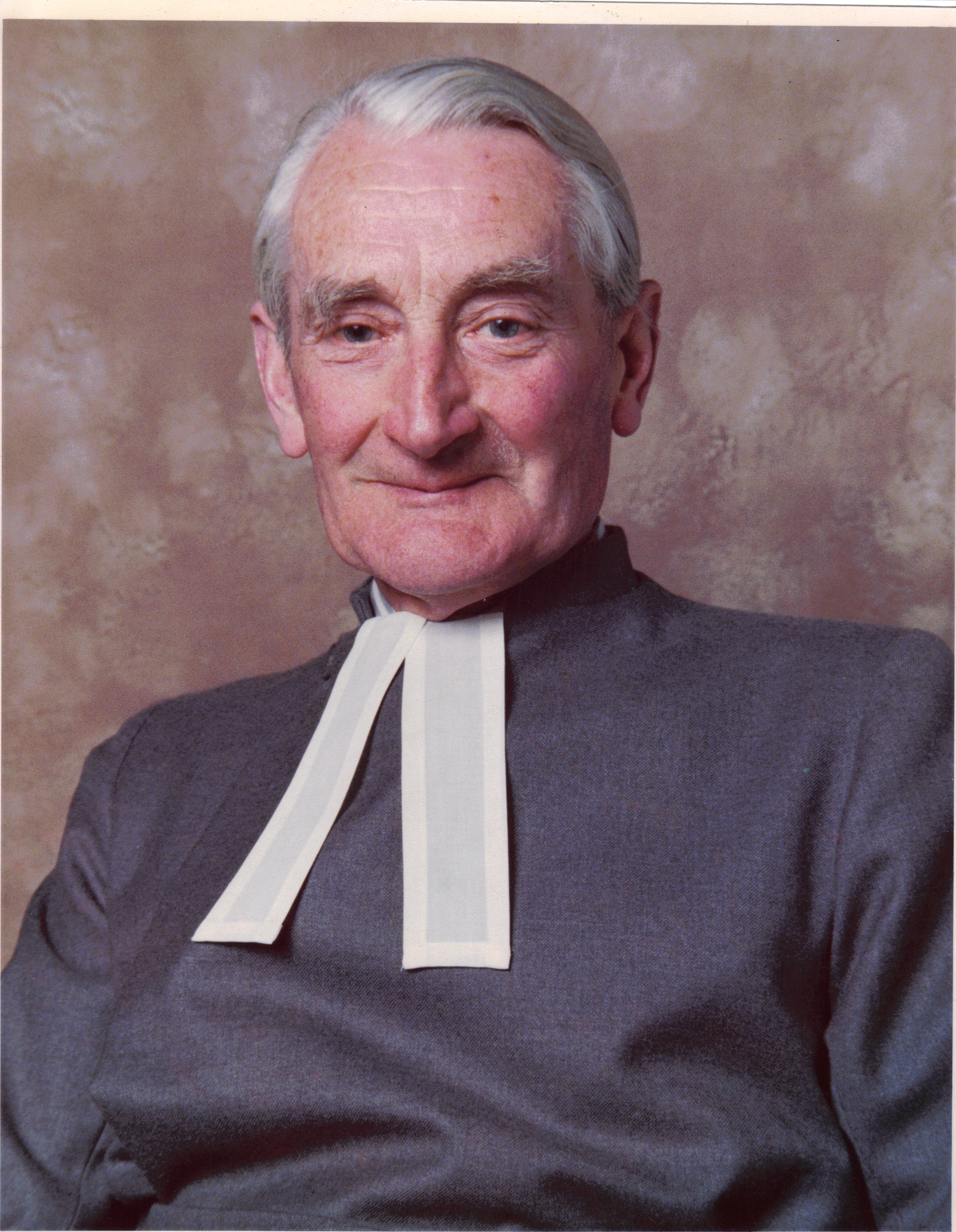
Beddoes

Ronald Alfred Beddoes (14 September 1912 – 1 November 2000) was an Anglican Priest. He was born on 14 September 1912, educated at St Chad's College, Durham and ordained deacon in 1936 and priest in 1937. He was President of the Durham Union for Easter term of 1936.

After a curacy at Dawdon, County Durham he was Priest in charge of Grindon. He then held incumbencies at Greatham and Easington (including during the 1951 Easington Colliery explosion) until his appointment as the fourth Provost of Derby Cathedral in 1953. He resigned in 1981 and was Priest in charge of St Anne's, Beeley and St Peter's Church, Edensor until 1997.

He died in autumn 2000, aged 88.

Church of England titles
| Preceded by Ronald Stanhope More O'Ferrall | Provost of Derby; 1953 – 1981 | Succeeded by Benjamin Hugh Lewers |
