= Robert Mangin =

Archdeacon of Lindisfarne from 1924 to 1944

Robert Rattray Mangin (1 October 1863 – 27 June 1944) was Archdeacon of Lindisfarne from 1924 until his death.

Mangin was educated at Marlborough College and New College, Oxford. After a curacy at Newburn he held incumbencies in Alnwick, Ashington, Benwell.

His son Sir Thorleif Rattray Orde Mangin was a colonial administrator.

Church of England titles
Preceded by George Albert Ormsby	Archdeacon of Lindisfarne; 1924–1944	Succeeded by Thomas Pears Gordon Foreman
