= Richard Coxe (priest) =

English churchman (1800–1865)

Richard Charles Coxe (25 July 1800 – 25 August 1865) was an English churchman and author, archdeacon of Lindisfarne from 1853.

== Life ==
He was half-brother to Henry Octavius Coxe, was educated at Norwich Grammar School, and was elected scholar of Worcester College, Oxford, in 1818, where he graduated B.A. in 1821 and M.A. in 1824. He was ordained deacon in 1823, and priest in the following year. After for some time acting as chaplain of Archbishop Tenison's chapel, Regent Street, London, he obtained in 1841 the vicarage of Newcastle-on-Tyne.

In 1843 Coxe was appointed honorary canon of Durham Cathedral. From 1845 till he left Newcastle he received an annual supplement of five hundred guineas to his income, subscribed by his parishioners. In 1853 he obtained the archdeaconry of Lindisfarne with the vicarage of Eglingham, Northumberland, annexed; and in 1857 he was appointed canon of Durham. He died at Eglingham vicarage, 25 August 1865. Coxe was a strenuous opponent of latitudinarianism in doctrine and practice, and upheld the rights and privileges of the clergy.

== Works ==
Besides individual sermons and addresses Coxe was the author of the following theological works:

- Lectures on the Evidences from Miracles, 1832;
- Practical Sermons, 1836;
- Death disarmed of its Sting, 1836;
- The Symmetry of Revelation a Witness to the Divinity of Christ, 1845; and
- Remorse: Remorse for Intellectual and Literary Offences: Retribution, 1864.

He also published:

- Six Ballads, 1842;
- The Mercy at Marsdon Rocks, 1844;
- Poems, Scriptural, Classical, Miscellaneous, 1845;
- The Snow Shroud, or the Lost Bairn o' Biddlestone Edge, 1845;
- Leda Tanah, the Martyr's Child; Derwent Bank, 1851;
- Woodnotes (the Silvitudia of Casimir Surbievius, with a translation in English verse); Musings at Tynemouth, ten sonnets; North and South, ten sonnets, 1848; and
- Ballads from the Portuguese in the second part of John Adamson's Lusitania Illustrata.

== Family ==
Coxe married Louisa, daughter of Rev. J. Maule of Dover, and left a daughter and two sons.

== Notes ==
Attribution

This article incorporates text from a publication now in the public domain: "Coxe, Richard Charles". Dictionary of National Biography. London: Smith, Elder & Co. 1885–1900.
