= Catherine Sourbut Groves =

British Anglican priest

The Venerable Catherine Sourbut Groves
- Archdeacon of Lindisfarne
- Church: Church of England
- Diocese: Diocese of Newcastle
- In office: November 2020 to present

Orders
- Ordination: 2007 (deacon); 2008 (priest) by Peter Maurice

Personal details
- Born: Catherine Ann Sourbut; 1967 (age 58–59)
- Denomination: Anglicanism
- Education: University of Bath; Sarum College

Catherine Ann Sourbut Groves (née Sourbut; born 1967) is a British Anglican priest. Since November 2020, she has served as Archdeacon of Lindisfarne in the Church of England Diocese of Newcastle. She had previously worked in academia and administration at the University of Bath, and in parish ministry in the Diocese of Bath and Wells.

== Early life and education ==
Born Catherine Ann Sourbut, she was brought up in Yorkshire, England. She studied modern languages at the University of Bath, graduating with a Bachelor of Arts (BA) degree in 1991. As part of her degree she spent a year abroad in Germany, and experienced the fall of the Berlin Wall. She then studied for a Master of Science (MSc) degree in social research, which she completed in 1993, and a Doctor of Philosophy (PhD) degree, which she completed in 1997. Her doctoral thesis was titled "Constructions of motherhood: representations and realities of women's experiences as mothers in the former GDR under state socialism and capitalism". She remained at the University of Bath to teach in the German section of the Department of European Studies & Modern Languages, before working as a research manager within the Department of Psychology and the School for Health from 2000 to 2007.

She trained for ordination with the Southern Theological Education and Training Scheme (STETS), and then with Sarum College after STETS merged into the college. She continued her studies in theology to complete a Master of Arts (MA) degree.

== Ordained ministry ==
On 1 July 2007, Sourbut Groves was ordained as a deacon in the Church of England by Peter Maurice, Bishop of Taunton, during a service at Wells Cathedral. She was ordained as a priest the following year. She served her curacy in three rural village parishes in the Diocese of Bath and Wells between 2007 and 2011. She then moved to the benefice of the Church of St Barnabas, Bath and St Peter's Church, Englishcombe as priest-in-charge, before being made vicar of the same benefice in 2016. She was additionally appointed to the honorary position of prebendary of Wells Cathedral in 2019.

In August 2020, it was announced that she would be the next Archdeacon of Lindisfarne in the Diocese of Newcastle. She was collated as archdeacon during a service on 14 November 2020; this service occurred online, as a Zoom meeting, due to a national lockdown caused by the COVID-19 pandemic. She also has a diocese-wide leading role relating to rural parish ministry.

== Personal life ==
Sourbut Groves is married to Mike Groves. They have two children.
