= Toby Wright (priest) =

British Anglican priest

The Very Reverend Toby Wright
- Dean of Wells
- Church: Church of England
- Diocese: Bath and Wells
- In office: January 2024 – present
- Predecessor: John Davies

Orders
- Ordination: 2002 (priest)

Personal details
- Born: Toby Christopher Wright; March 1975 (age 51)
- Denomination: Anglicanism
- Education: New College, Oxford; College of the Resurrection, Mirfield

Toby Christopher Wright (born March 1975) is a British Anglican priest. Since 2024, he has served as Dean of Wells, the priest first-among-equals at Wells Cathedral and the most senior priest in the Diocese of Bath and Wells.

== Life and career ==
Wright was born in March 1975. He was educated at New College, Oxford, and trained as a priest at the College of the Resurrection, Mirfield. He served as curate at St Peter with St Mary, Petersfield, and was ordained priest in 2002. From 2004 he served as Priest in Charge and from 2006 as Vicar of St John Chrysostom with St Andrew, Peckham, and also served as Area Dean of Camberwell. In 2009, he became Team Rector of Witney, Oxfordshire, and served as Area Dean of Witney between 2013 and 2019. He was then seconded to the Dorchester Episcopal Area Team, serving for part of this time as Acting Associate Archdeacon. He is also Warden of the Community of St Mary the Virgin at Wantage.

After being appointed as Dean of Wells on 15 January 2024, he was installed as Dean on 16 June, in a service presided over by the Bishop of Bath and Wells, Michael Beasley.

Church of England titles
Preceded by John Davies	Dean of Wells; 2024–	incumbent
