= Henry Hodgson (bishop) =

Anglican bishop (1856–1921)

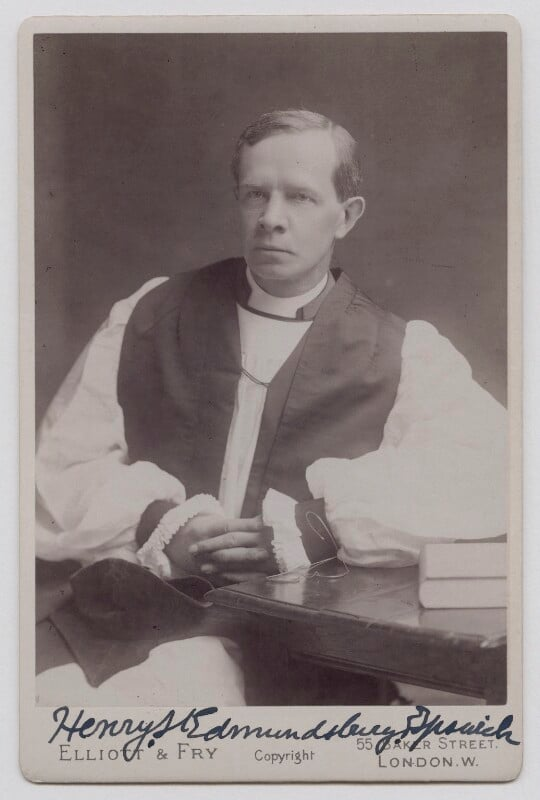
Hodgson, c. 1910s

Henry Bernard Hodgson (10 March 1856 – 28 February 1921) was an Anglican bishop in the first half of the 20th century.

== Biography ==
Hodgson was born on 10 March 1856 in Penrith into an ecclesiastical family, the second son of George Courtenay Hodgson, vicar of Barton, Cumberland, and his wife Elizabeth Buckham. He was educated at Shrewsbury School and matriculated The Queen's College, Oxford in 1874, aged 18, graduating B.A. in 1878; he was a senior student at Christ Church, Oxford 1878–85, graduating M.A. in 1881, and was ordained in 1880.

Hodgson began his career as a school chaplain at Elizabeth College, Guernsey after which he was Vicar of Staverton, Northamptonshire then Headmaster of Birkenhead School. Later he was Vicar of Thornbury, Gloucestershire then Rural Dean of Norham.

Hodgson was the Archdeacon of Lindisfarne from 1904 to 1914, when he was elevated to the episcopate as the inaugural Bishop of St Edmundsbury and Ipswich. This was a new diocese, and Hodgson was its first bishop. How he came to be translated from the most northerly of parishes (his base was Berwick-upon-Tweed) to St Edmundsbury is probably through his candidature being promoted by Edgar Jacob, bishop of St Albans and formerly Bishop of Newcastle. Jacob had appointed Hodgson to Berwick, and Jacob had helped to prepare the legislation creating the new bishopric of Sheffield, St Edmundsbury & Ipswich, and also Chelmsford which was part of the huge St Albans diocese. Hodgson's name had first arisen in the context of a see when Lichfield became vacant in 1913. Prime Minister Asquith, the key figure in the appointment to bishoprics, mentioned Hodgson's name to the Archbishop of Canterbury, Randall Davidson, who was unimpressed. "Hodgson of Berwick I don't know personally and from what little I have heard of him, I'd certainly have not thought of him as episcopabalis". Hodgson was not appointed to Lichfield but, one year later, he was offered and accepted St Edmunds-bury & Ipswich.

The monthly diocesan magazine shows that Hodgson was a strong supporter of World War I. In October, 1916, he wrote "We have taken up arms on behalf of righteousness, truth and liberty; we look in the strenuous labours of the campaign, to moral and spiritual forces for support and final victory". In October, 1917, he wrote, showing no change to his view despite losing a son on 1 July 1916, "... no weakening of moral purpose and moral indignation; right and wrong, falsehood and truth stand where they stood in August, 1914, and we must stand by them still, however hard or horrible the conditions". The diocesan magazines are filled with reports from parishes supporting the War effort. For example, it was reported in December, 1914, that £6 had been raised in a house-to-house collection in Cockfield for soldiers blankets, that Barrow had 100 men on active service, and that a YMCA tent had been erected on the green at Beyton.

Hodgson was regarded as a decidedly local bishop and not a national figure. He died suddenly on 28 February 1921. There is a memorial to him at St Edmundsbury Cathedral.

== Family ==
Hodgson married in 1882 Penelope Warren, daughter of Admiral Richard Laird Warren; they had three sons and a daughter. The war poet William Noel Hodgson was their youngest child.

Church of England titles
| New diocese | Bishop of Saint Edmundsbury and Ipswich; 1914 – 1921 | Succeeded by Albert David |
