= Claude Mangin =

French judge

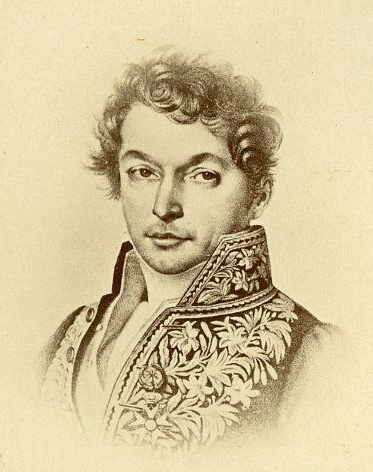
Claude Mangin portrait

Jean-Henri Claude Mangin was a French magistrate (7 March 1786 Metz- 1835). He was head of the Paris police at the time of the Trois Glorieuses.

Procureur général of the royal court of Poitiers, he was named Prefect of Police of Paris on 13 August 1829.

Due to the coup of Charles X and the Prince of Polignac in July 1830, he stated that "what we did was right, Paris didn't move, and it responded at its head." On 27 July 1830, he ordered the seizure of four presses of journalists who, contrary to the July Ordinances, were publishing without authorisation. This was the signal for the typographers revolt which sparked the 1830 revolution.

== See also ==
=== Bibliography ===
- Suzanne d'Huart, Le dernier préfet de police de Charles X : Claude Mangin, Actes du 84e Congrès national des sociétés savantes, Dijon, 1959. Section d'histoire moderne et contemporaine, Paris, Impr. nationale, 1960, p. 603-616
- P. Masse, Claude Mangin (1786-1835), procureur général à la cour de Poitiers, préfet de police de Charles X, et ses rapports avec le Poitou, Société des Antiquaires de l'Ouest, 1974
