= Edward Mangin =

Edward Mangin (1772-1852) was an Irish priest of the Church of Ireland, and a writer.

Born in Dublin, Ireland, Mangin matriculated from Balliol College, Oxford on 9 June 1792. He graduated B.A. in 1793, M.A. in 1795, and was ordained in the Irish church. On 2 March 1798 he was collated to the prebendal stall of Dysart in Killaloe Cathedral, which he vacated on 15 January 1800 by his collation as prebendary of Rathmichael in St Patrick's Cathedral, Dublin. This preferment he surrendered on 1 December 1803, when he became prebendary of Rath in the Diocese of Killaloe, in which position he remained until his death. Direct descendant of Etienne Mangin of distinguished Huguenot ancestry. Mangin spent most of his working life in Bath and published many works, original and translated, including The Life of G.C. Lamoignon Malesherbes; George the Third, A Novel in 3 volumes; An Essay On Light Reading; The Parlour Window, and Piozziana: or Recollections of the Late Mrs. Piozzi, also of Bath, a close friend and a descendant of Katheryn of Berain. Inadequate justice was rendered to his talents as an author, and he was recognized as head of the literary students of that city he spent most of his working life at 10 Johnstone St., Bath where he died.
