= Bernard Pauncefote =

English cricketer

Bernard Pauncefote (28 June 1848 – 24 September 1882) was an English first-class cricketer active 1868–72 who played for Middlesex. He was born in Madras; he died in Blackheath.
