= Robert Micklem =

Commander Sir Robert Micklem, CBE (5 June 1891 – 13 May 1952) was a naval officer, submariner and chairman and a managing director of the British engineerings company Vickers-Armstrongs.

== Early life ==
Micklem was born Edward Robert Micklem on 5 June 1891 in Chingford, Essex, the son of Leonard Micklem of Abbot's Mead at Elstree in Hertfordshire, by his second wife, Nanette Fenwick. He was the younger brother of Brigadier-General John Micklem DSO MC and half-brother of the Very Rev Philip Micklem. Micklem joined the Royal Navy in 1903 and served for two years in the submarine service during the First World War.

== Vickers and Second World War ==
He retired from the Navy as a Commander in 1919 and he went to work for companies associated with Vickers becoming General Manager at Elswick in 1928. He was appointed a Commander of the Order of the British Empire (CBE) in the 1942 Birthday Honours.

During the second world war he acted as chairman of Tank Board from 1942 to 1944 and a chairman in the Ministry of Supply of the armoured fighting vehicle division. He was knighted in 1946. Within a few years of the end of the war he became firstly deputy chairman and then chairman of Vickers-Armstrongs. In 1951 he was appointed joint managing director of Vickers until he resigned due to ill health in April 1952.

== Family life ==
Micklem married Sibyl Head in 1922 and they had a son and daughter. Micklem died in a nursing home in the Marylebone district of London on 13 May 1952, aged 60.
