= Philip Micklem =

Anglican priest (1876–1965)

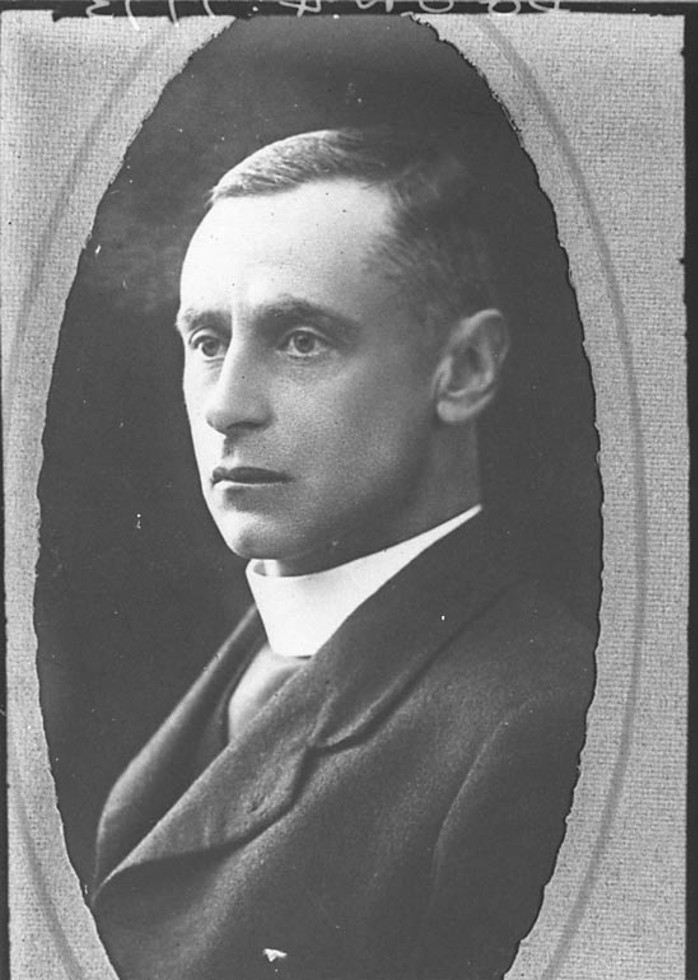
Micklem by Sam Hood (1925)

Philip Arthur Micklem (1876–1965) was an Anglican priest in England and Australia.

== Family ==
He was born on 5 April 1876 in Waltham St Lawrence in Berkshire, England, the son of Leonard Micklem of Abbot's Mead in Elstree in Hertfordshire, by his first wife, Dora Emily Weguelin. He was the half-brother of both Commander Sir Robert Micklem and Brigadier-General John Micklem DSO MC.

In 1932 he married a school teacher, Evelyn Murial Auriac (1907–2010), in Sydney, Australia.

== Education ==
He was educated at Harrow School and Hertford College, Oxford. He was ordained after studying at Ripon College Cuddesdon in 1903.

== Career ==
After a curacy at Shere he was a lecturer at St Augustine's College, Canterbury. From 1910 to 1917 he was a canon residentiary at St John's Cathedral, Brisbane, and principal of the Brisbane Theological College. He was rector of St James' Church, Sydney, from then until his appointment as the second Provost of Derby Cathedral.

Micklem resigned in 1947 and died on 5 December 1965.

== Works ==
- Sermon at the consecration of J. O. Feetham as bishop (North Queensland) in Brisbane Cathedral, April 1911
- Sermon at the opening of the Diocesan Synod in Brisbane Cathedral 1911; repeated verbatim at the opening of Sydney Synod in 1922 (text is in the Sydney Diocesan Year Book, either 1922 or 1923)
- St Matthew Westminster Commentaries, Methuen, 1917. OCLC 296702
- Social unity and the teaching of the New Testament 15 July 1918.
- Principles of church organization: with special reference to the Church of England in Australia, London: Society for Promoting Christian Knowledge, 1921.
- Spiritual healing prepared on behalf of the Select Committee appointed by the Diocese of Sydney. 1921?
- Values of the Incarnation, London: Society for Promoting Christian Knowledge, New York: Macmillan, 1932.
- Australia's first bishop: a brief memoir of William Grant Broughton, Sydney: Angus & Robertson, 1936.
- Sermon in St. Andrew's Cathedral, April 1937 at a University Service

Church of England titles
Preceded by Herbert Ham	Provost of Derby; 1937 – 1947	Succeeded by Ronald Stanhope More O'Ferrall
