= Nathaniel Micklem (theologian) =

British theologian

Nathaniel Micklem CH (10 April 1888 – 26 December 1976) was a British theologian and political activist who also served as the principal of Mansfield College.

== Early life and education ==
Micklem was born in Brondesbury. His father, also Nathaniel Micklem, was a barrister who later became a Liberal Party Member of Parliament. He grew up in Boxmoor, Hertfordshire, and studied at Rugby School, New College, Oxford and Mansfield College, serving as President of the Oxford Union.

== Career ==
In 1914, he was ordained as a Congregationalist minister, serving at Highbury Chapel, then briefly in Wythenshawe, from which he was removed due to his opposition to the First World War.

Micklem then worked for the YMCA in Dieppe before becoming the chaplain of Mansfield College. In 1921, he began teaching the Old Testament at Selly Oak Colleges and also started writing on the topic. He moved to Kingston, Ontario in 1927, to teach the New Testament at the Queen's Theological College, who made him an honorary Doctor of Divinity. He returned to Mansfield College in 1932, serving for a year as vice-principal, then until 1953 as principal of the college.

While at the college, Micklem wrote extensively on the need for Congregationalists to adopt "orthodox" Christianity, seeing reason as founded in faith, rather than the other way around. In the late 1930s, he visited Germany twice, bringing back literature from the German Confessing Church. He published National Socialism and the Roman Catholic Church in 1939, and broadcast a weekly radio show during the war focussing on Christianity in Europe. In contrast to the First World War, Micklem strongly supported the Second World War.

On 9 June 1944 he spoke at the Oxford Socratic Club on "Christianity and Other Faiths." He is the author of The Labyrinth, a "philosophical poem" consisting of 100 Spenserian stanzas, published by Oxford University Press in 1945.

Micklem served as chairman of the Congregational Union in 1944. He was part of the joint Anglican and non-conformist committee which wrote Church Relations in England in 1950, and championed the merger with Presbyterians which produced the United Reformed Church. He retired in 1953, but became more politically active, and served as President of the Liberal Party in 1957/8. Within the party, he championed the free market.

== Honours ==
In 1974, he was invested as a Member of the Order of the Companions of Honour.

Party political offices
Preceded by Leonard Behrens	President of the Liberal Party; 1957–1958	Succeeded by Arthur Comyns Carr
