= Derby Cathedral =

- Cathedral Church of All Saints
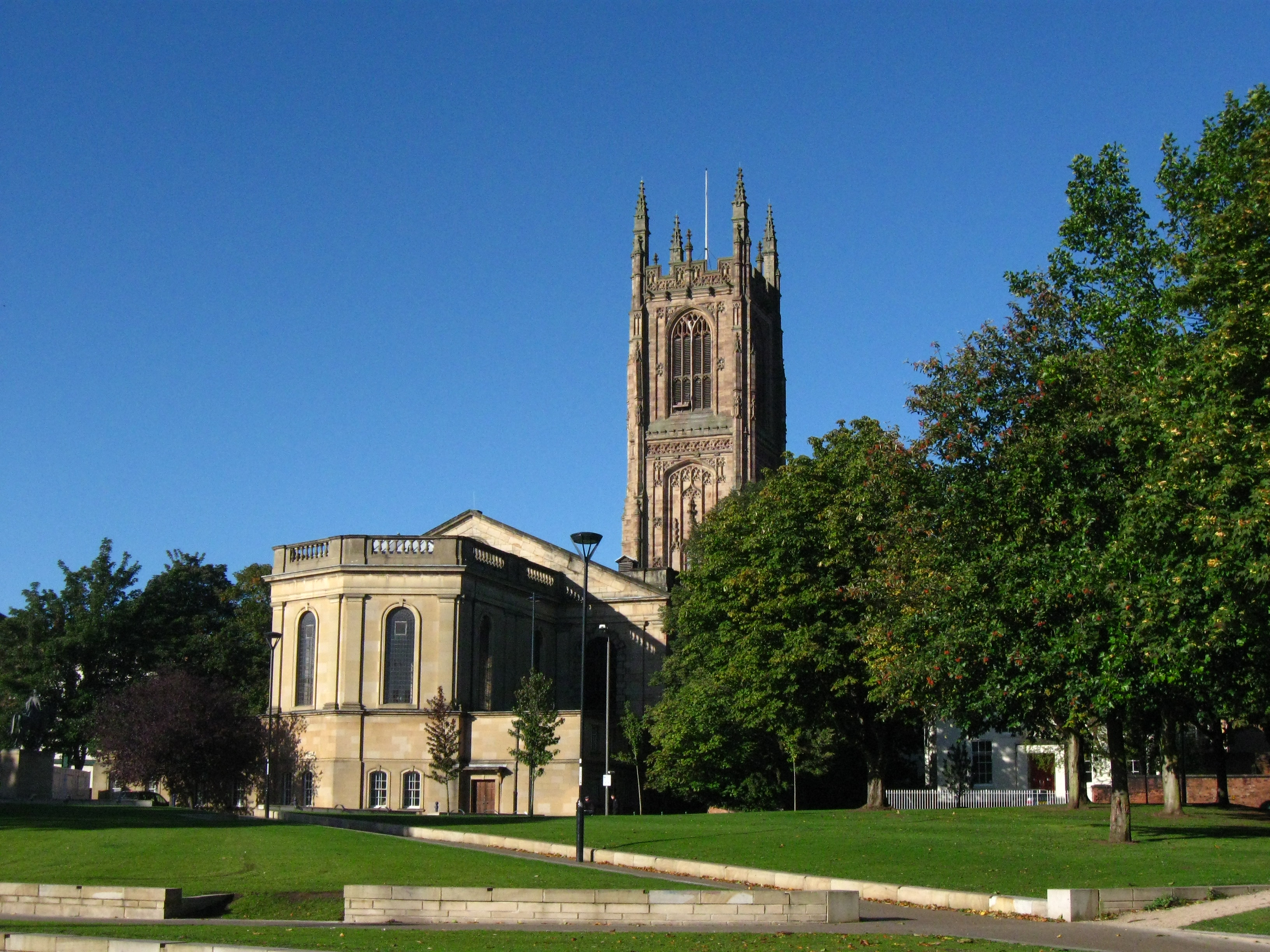
- East view of the cathedral

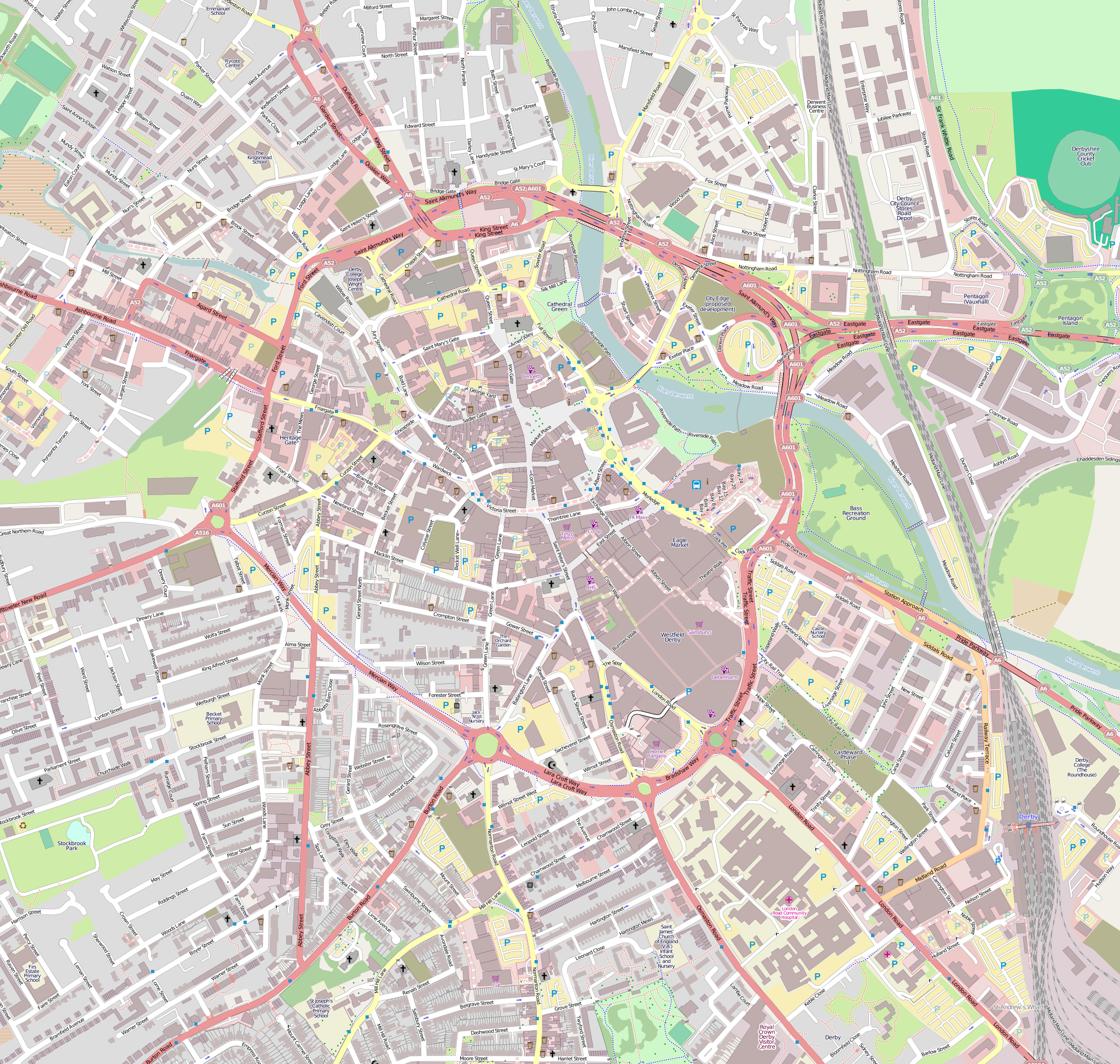
- Location in Derby
- 52°55′29″N 1°28′38″W
- Location: Derby, Derbyshire
- Country: England
- Denomination: Church of England
- Previous denomination: Roman Catholic
- Website: derbycathedral.org

History
- Former name(s): All Saints' Church, Derby (6th century – 1927)
- Consecrated: 1927

Architecture
- Style: Gothic, Neoclassical
- Years built: c. 1530–1725 renovated 1969–1975, 2015–2016

Administration
- Province: Canterbury
- Diocese: Derby

Clergy
- Dean: Peter Robinson

Listed Building – Grade I
- Official name: Cathedral Church of All Saints
- Designated: 20 June 1952
- Reference no.: 1228277

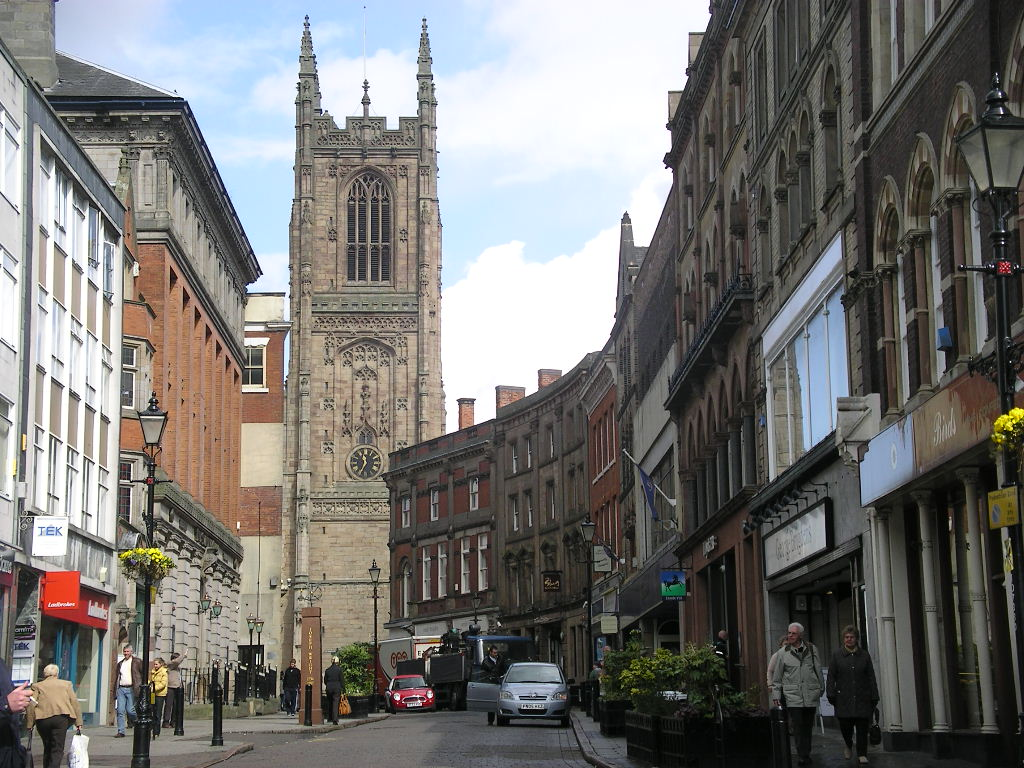
The cathedral from Irongate

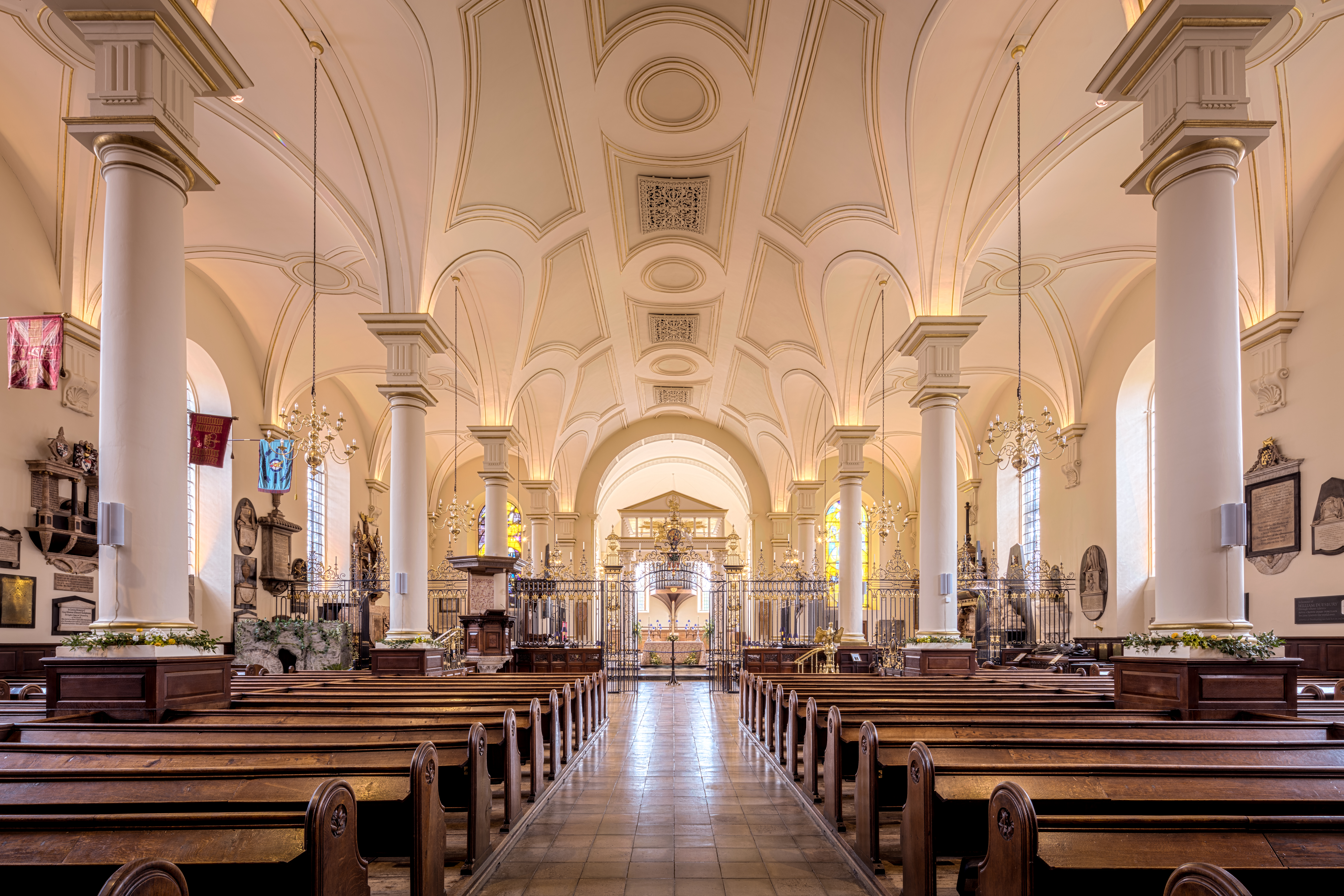
Interior of the nave

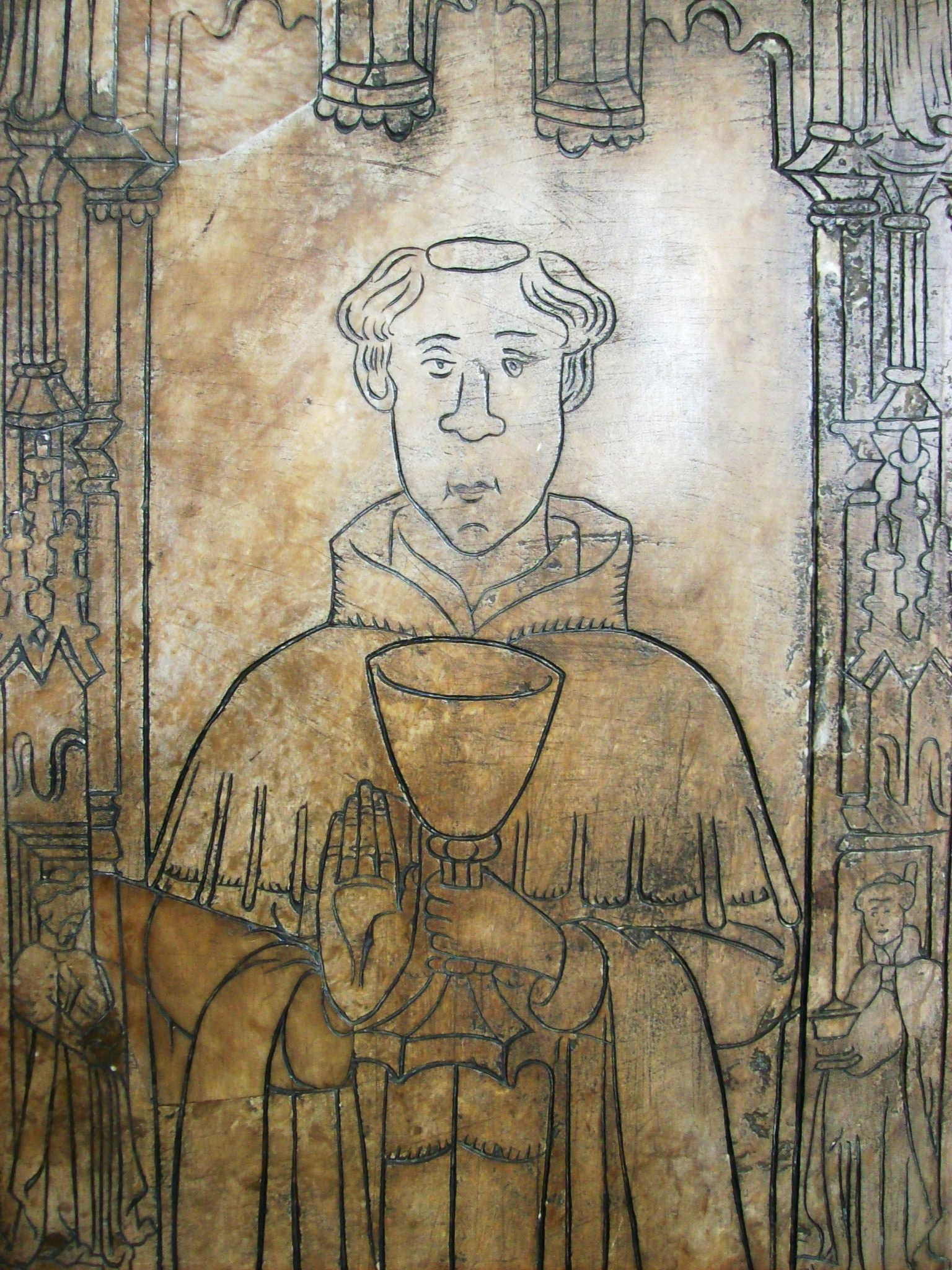
Alabaster memorial to John Lawe, inscribed in Latin: "Under this lies John Lawe, once a Canon of the Collegiate Church of All Saints, Derby, and Sub-Deacon of the same, who died in the year of Our Lord 1400. cuius animae propicietur deus amen"

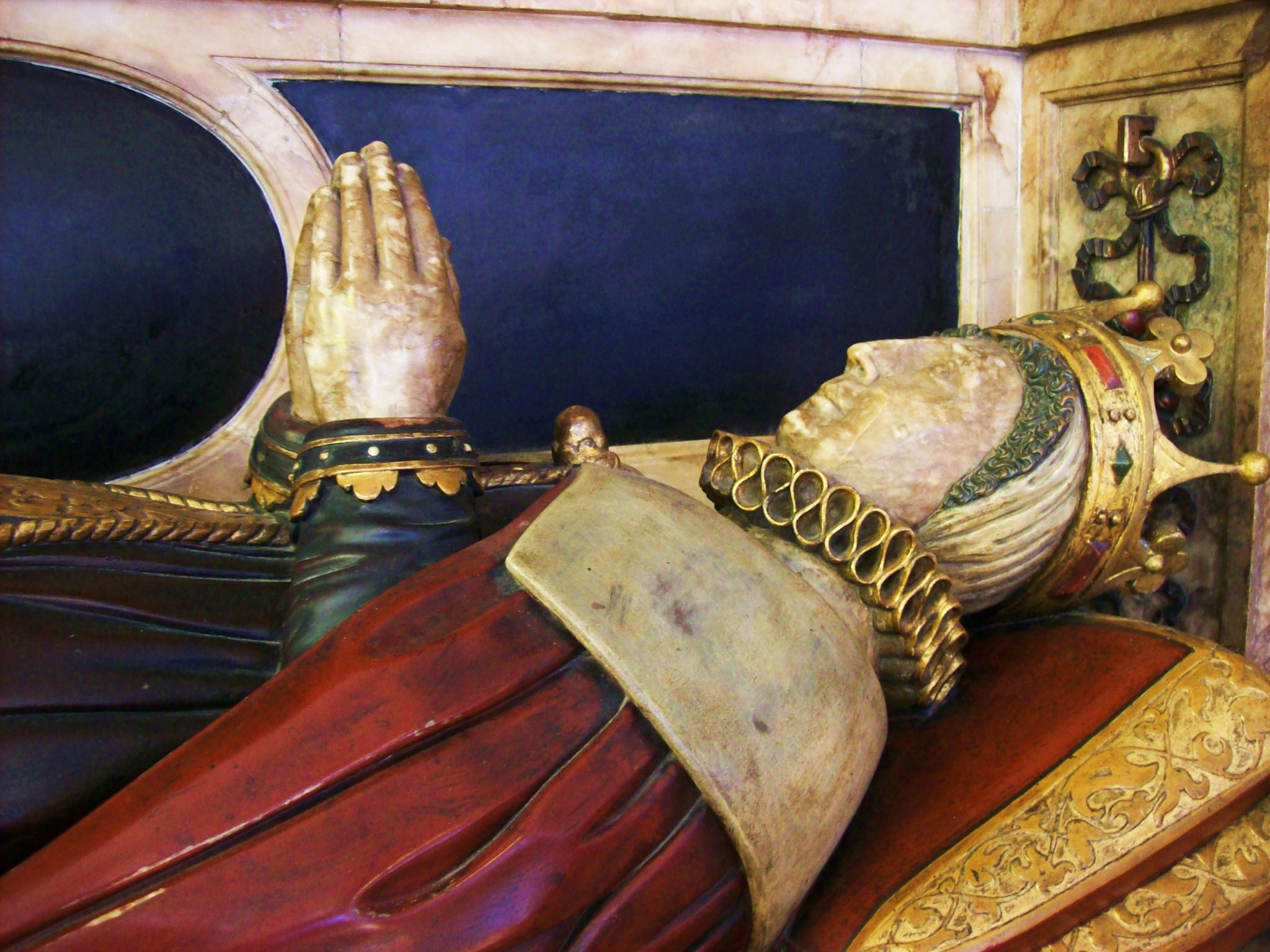
Tomb effigy of Bess of Hardwick (Elizabeth, Countess of Shrewsbury)

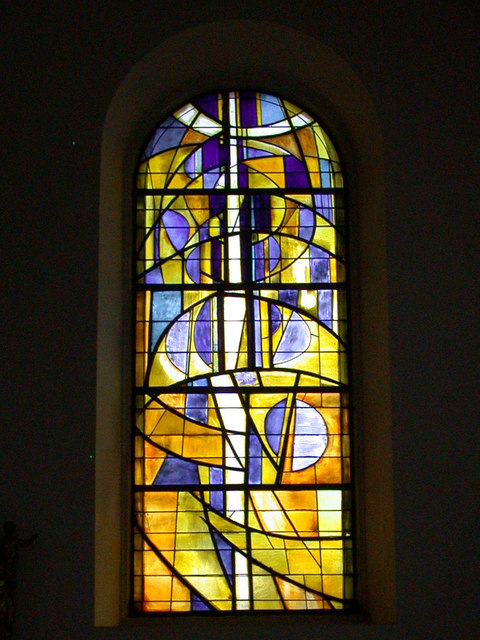
Derby Cathedral SE window. One of a pair of windows, designed by Ceri Richards (1965), symbolising "All Saints" and "All Souls"

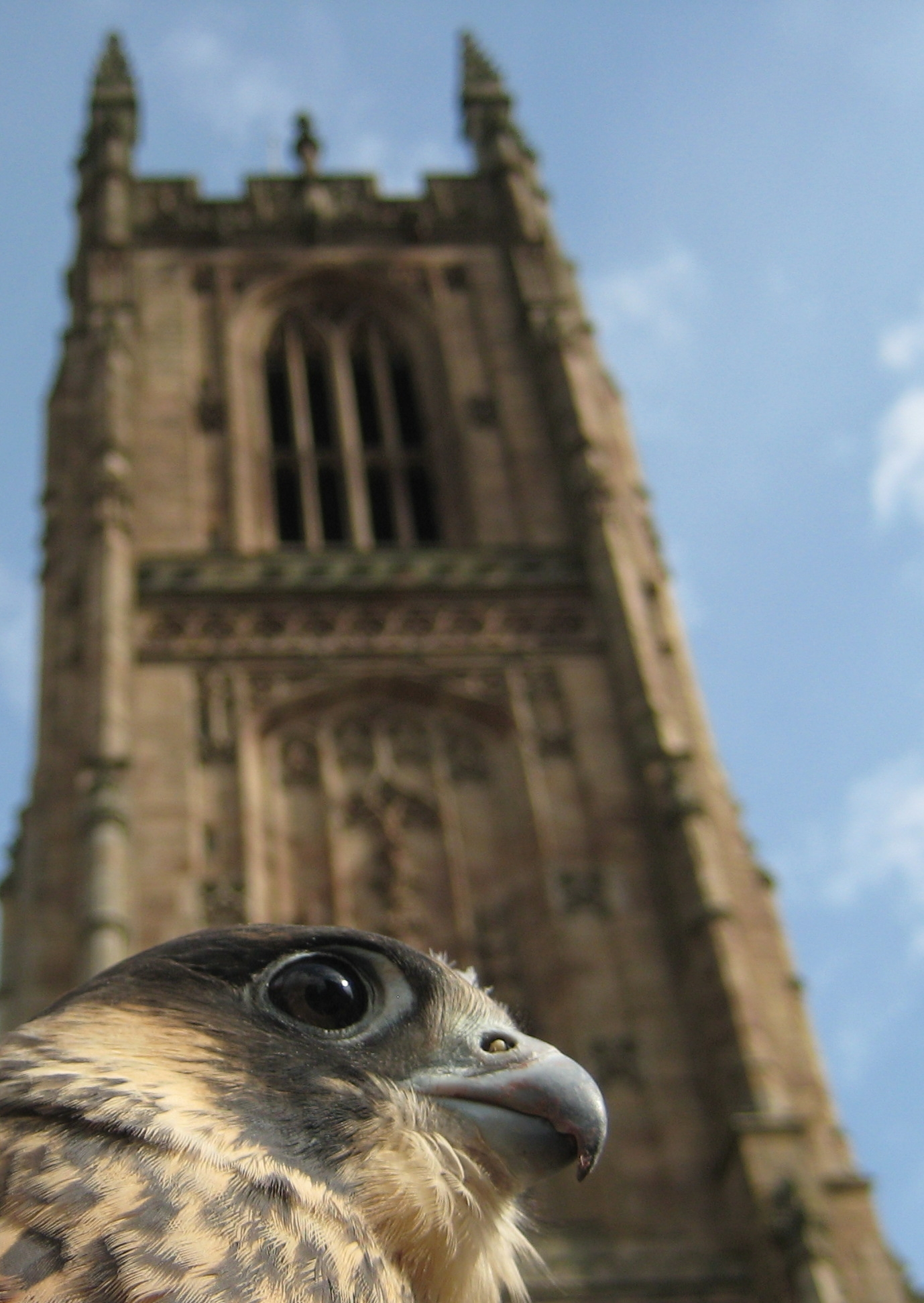
Juvenile peregrine falcon and Derby Cathedral tower, south side

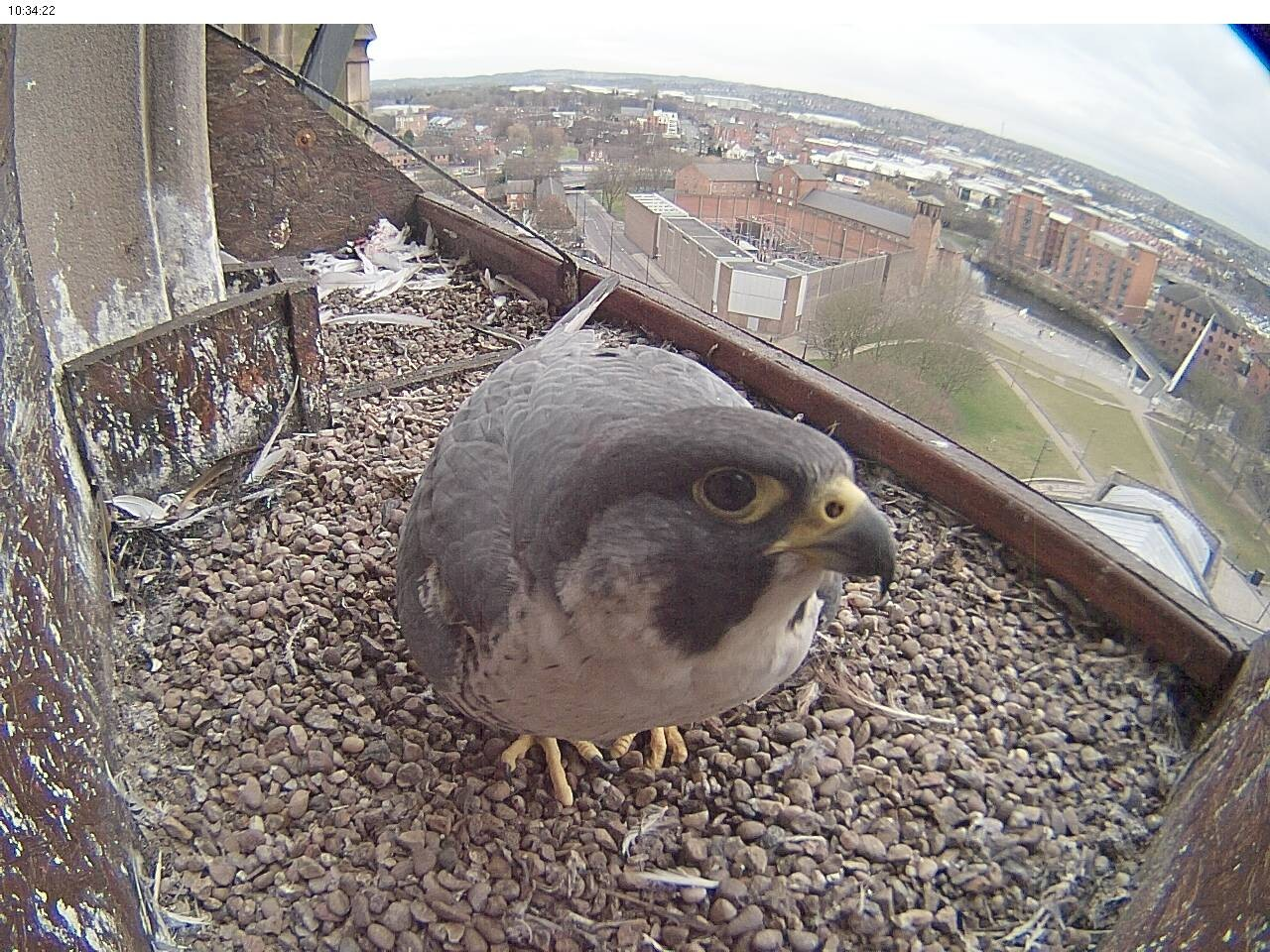
Female peregrine falcon on nest platform installed on Derby Cathedral's mediaeval tower in 2006

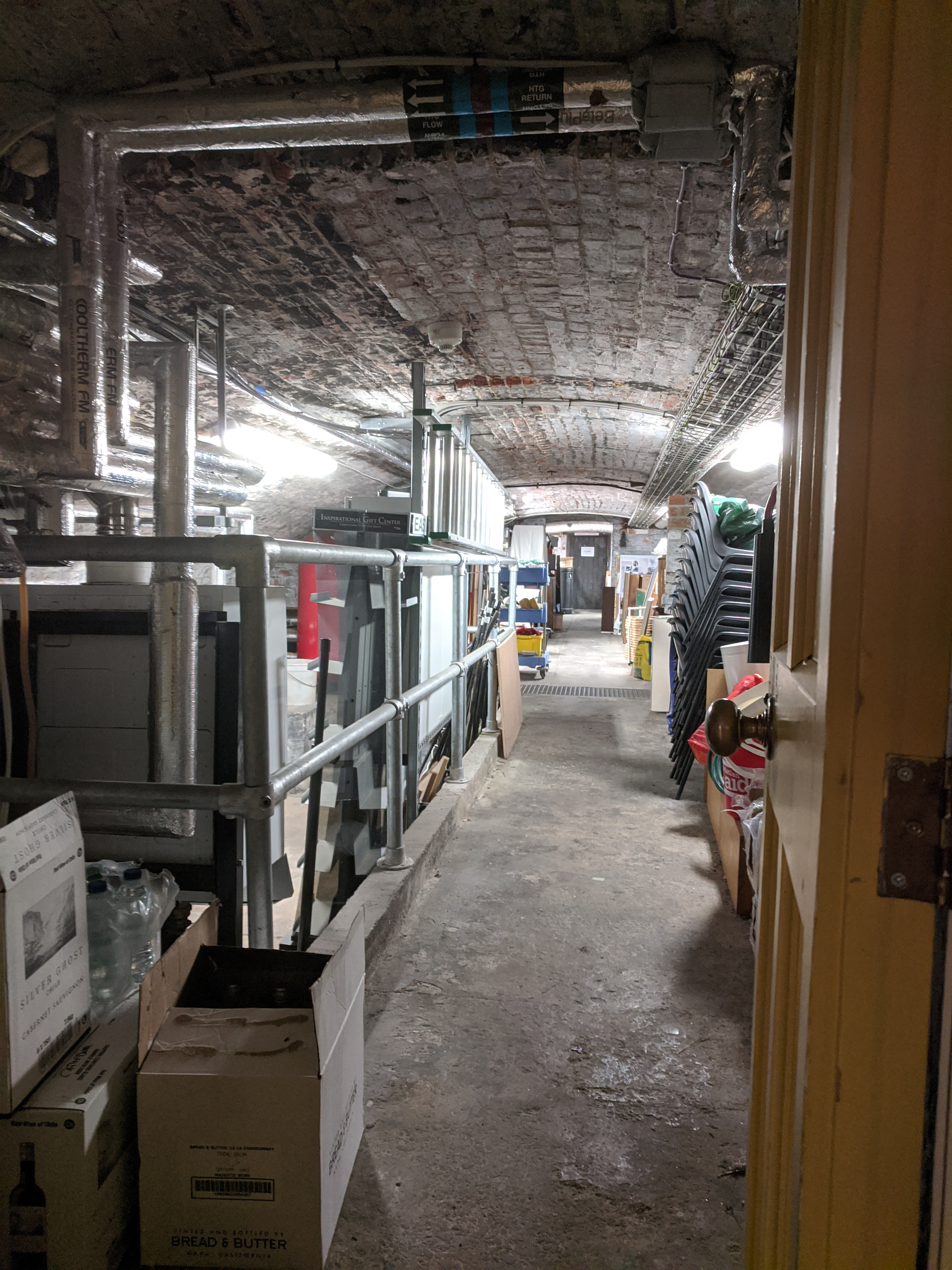
Passageway to organ room

The Cathedral Church of All Saints, Derby, better known as Derby Cathedral, is a cathedral church in the city of Derby, England. In 1927, it was promoted from parish church status to that of a cathedral, creating a seat for the Bishop of Derby, which new Episcopal see was created in that year. The original church of All Saints was founded in the mid-10th century as a royal collegiate church, dedicated to All Saints. The main body of the church as it stands today is a Georgian rebuilding by James Gibbs, completed in 1725. The tower dates from the 16th century, and a retroquire was added in the 20th century.

== History ==
=== All Saints' Church ===
The original church, dedicated to All Saints, was probably built in about 943 by the Anglo-Saxon King Edmund I as a royal collegiate church, of which building no trace survives. Following the Norman Conquest of 1066, and according to the Domesday Book of 1086, it belonged to the king, and was served by a college of seven priests.

The Saxon building probably became structurally unstable, and was therefore demolished. A new building was constructed in the 14th century, which surviving drawings show was about the same size as the present building. In 1510–1532, the surviving 212-foot (65 m) tower was built in the Perpendicular Gothic style. On top of the tower are twelve large sculpted grotesque animal figures, three per face, and the sculpted stone head of a Green Man can be seen on each side of the main West Door at the base of the tower. The tower is built with Ashover Grit sandstone, sourced from nearby Duffield Bank quarry.

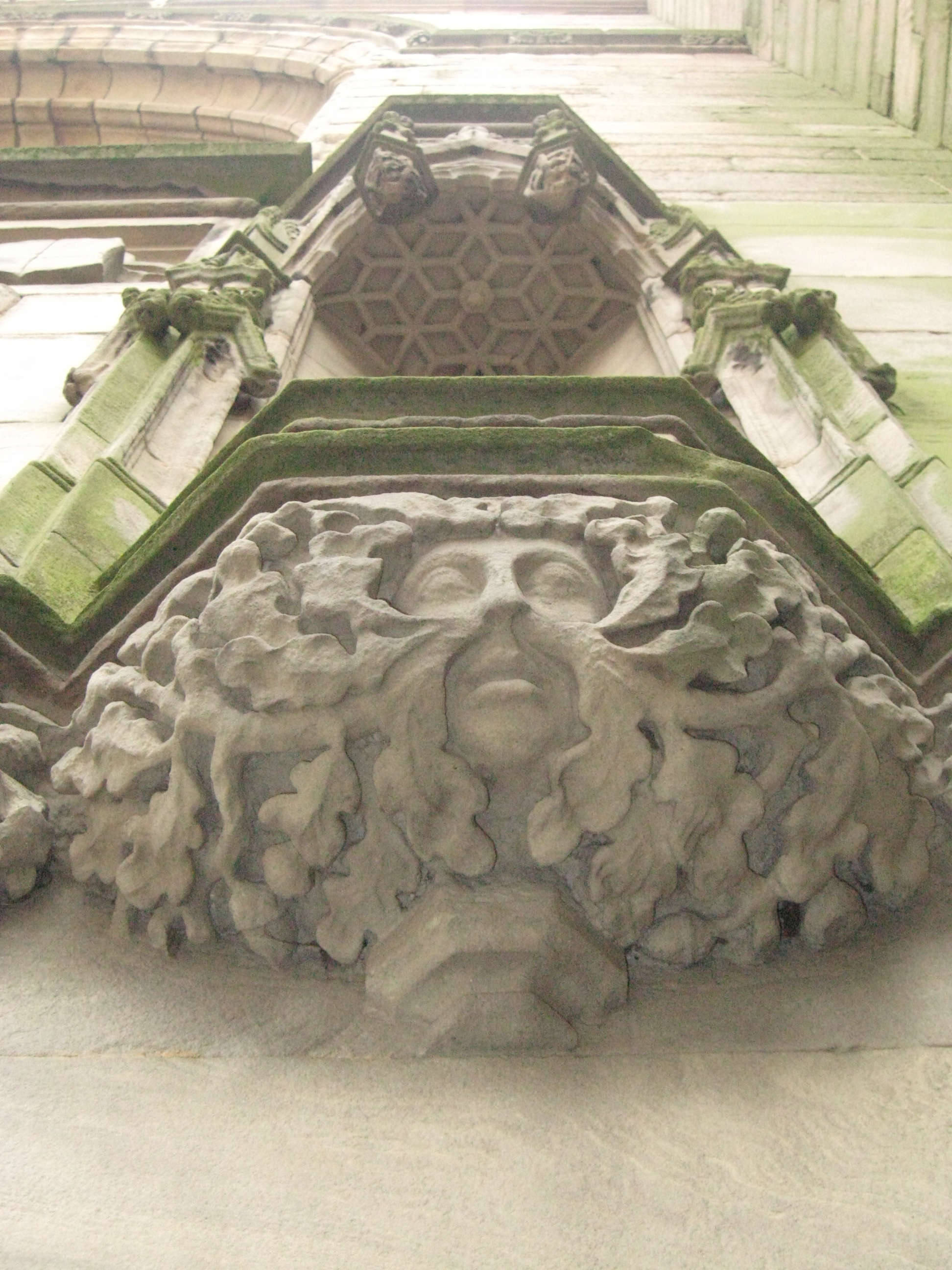
One of the two heads of Green Men, one each side of the main west entrance of Derby Cathedral

In 1556, during the persecutions of Protestants during the reign of Queen Mary (1553–1558), Joan Waste was tried for heresy within the Church of All Saints, and was executed on the Burton Road in Derby.

The fabric of the church appears to have deteriorated severely from about 1650, and was in a ruinous state in 1700. In February 1723 the vicar, Dr Michael Hutchinson, having decided that a new building was required, made the decision unilaterally to demolish the church, and employed a gang of workmen to accomplish the task overnight. Having accepted this fait accompli handed to them, the Mayor and Corporation of Derby commenced fundraising for the building of a new church by inviting subscriptions for the purpose, and made the first donation themselves. Dr Hutchinson expended much effort in fundraising, which exertion may have adversely affected his health. He made a significant personal financial contribution to the fund, and his efforts are recorded on a memorial tablet in the South Aisle. Having encountered numerous disputes, Hutchinson eventually resigned in 1728 and died about eighteen months later, leaving numerous outstanding debts.

With the original 1530s tower retained, the rest of the church was rebuilt to a Neo-Classical design made in 1725 by the architect James Gibbs. In his Book of Architecture, Gibbs wrote as follows regarding All Saints' Church: "It is the more beautiful for having no galleries, which, as well as pews, clog up and spoil the insides of churches ... the plainness of this building makes it less expensive, and renders it more suitable to the old steeple". To offset the rather austere interior, Gibbs introduced a wrought iron chancel screen, extending across the entire width of the church, manufactured by the local iron-smith and gate-maker Robert Bakewell, but not completed until five years after the new church was opened. The first sermon was preached in the new church on 25 November 1725.

By Order in Council on 1 July 1927, All Saints' Church became a cathedral. The new building was later extended eastwards with the addition of a retroquire designed by Sebastian Comper, constructed between 1967 and 1972.

The cathedral was registered as a charity on 9 April 2024, with the Registered Charity Number 1207768.

== Monuments and furnishings ==
The cathedral's treasures include the 18th-century wrought iron rood screen manufactured by Robert Bakewell, for which he was paid £157.10.0d (150 guineas); (Note: A guinea was a 'unit of account', with a value of 21 shillings (one pound and one shilling), used for professional fees and the like.) a monument with effigy of Bess of Hardwick, of Hardwick Hall; and monumental brasses of her descendants the Cavendish family (later the Dukes of Devonshire), including brasses of Henry Cavendish and of Georgiana Cavendish, Duchess of Devonshire. The entrance gates, moved to the cathedral from St Mary's Gate in 1957, were also made by Robert Bakewell. The gates were refurbished in 2012, and renamed the Queen Elizabeth II Gates to celebrate the Queen's Diamond Jubilee. Notable 20th-century additions are stained-glass windows designed by Ceri Richards, and a bronze crucifix by Ronald Pope.

== Clock and carillon ==
In 1927 a new clock was installed by John Smith & Son, Derby clockmakers, replacing one reputed to have been made by George Ashmore in 1738, but by then so worn as to be beyond its useful life. Until March 1976 this timekeeper and associated parts had been mechanically driven by heavy weights that had to be wound manually, some of them daily. This work had been undertaken by John Smith's for many years, but rising costs caused the authorities to install an automatic winding mechanism to both the clock and the carillon, which sounds the bells.

Derby Cathedral's clock has two dials, one facing West along St Mary's Gate, and one facing South down Irongate. Both are of stone and are 8 feet in diameter. They were restored and gilded in 1964, then again in the early 21st century. The 1964 restoration proved beyond doubt that the long metal tubes driven through the tower walls to operate the clock mechanism were actually gun barrels (cavalry carbines) dating from the 1745 'uprising' of Bonnie Prince Charlie.

The carillon is the mechanical instrument that drives the tunes played upon the cathedral's bells each day. It was installed by John Smith of Derby in 1931 to replace a machine of similar design, dating from the 17th century and subsequently enhanced towards the end of the 17th century by George Sorocold, a Derby millwright. The current machine plays a tune three times a day, and the seven tunes it plays are changed automatically each day. It is known that the tunes of the original machine were varied over the years, first by John Whitehurst at various times between 1745 and 1762, and then by John Smith in 1873.

There is documentary evidence to show that John Whitehurst was paid £3.3.0d (3 guineas) for winding and care of the clock and carillon, although he is known to have paid from this sum the amount of £1.11.6d (1½ gns.) to a Mr Frost, who did the actual daily winding of the carillon.

On 3 July 1976, one of the less well-known carillon tunes was replaced with the melody of "The Derby Ram", a regimental march associated with the Sherwood Foresters, so that it would become a permanent reminder of the Regiment's association with the town and county of Derby.

The tunes are currently played at 9 am, 12 noon and 6 pm as follows:

- Sunday — Thaxted
- Monday — Truro
- Tuesday — The Shady Bowers
- Wednesday — All Saints
- Thursday — Lass of Paittie's Mill
- Friday — The Highland Laddie
- Saturday — The Derby Ram

They can be listened to live on a local webcam feed. (The previous carillon played at 3, 6, 9, and 12 both night and day.)

== Tower and bells ==
Derby Cathedral has the oldest ring of ten bells in the world. Most of them have been there since 1678, when the number of bells was increased from six to ten. The largest bell weighs 19 cwt (965 kg), its note is D-flat and it is over 500 years old — older than the tower itself. It is believed that it came from Dale Abbey in Erewash in Derbyshire at the Dissolution of the Monasteries. The youngest bell, no. 3, is dated 1693, so all the bells are over 300 years old. Bell no. 8 was in Ashbourne parish church until 1815. A carillon in the tower uses the same bells to provide a tune at 9 am, 12 noon and 6 pm. The bells used to hang in a wooden frame; when the church became a cathedral in 1927, the bells were retuned and rehung at a lower level in a new metal frame.

On 28 October 1732, a Frenchman called Gillinoe 'flew' down on a rope from the top of All Saints' steeple. He did this on a number of occasions, landing variously at St Michael's church and at the bottom of St Mary's Gate. On one occasion an ass was sent down the rope, but it broke under the weight and a number of onlookers were injured.

On 25 July 1940, a wartime barrage balloon broke loose from its moorings during a heavy storm and, as it floated past, its chain caught round one of the pinnacles on the tower and demolished the top half of the pinnacle.

In late 2005, it was discovered that a pair of peregrine falcons had taken up residence on the cathedral tower. In 2006 a nesting platform was installed, and they nested there in April of that year. Webcams were installed in 2007, 2008 and 2013 to enable the birds to be seen at close range without being disturbed by human contact. The same pair successfully reared chicks every year up to and including 2016. However, on 27 March 2017 it became clear that a new male had taken over the nesting platform and ousted his predecessor who, by that time, was at least 14 years old. It is not known whether the first male died of old age, or was chased away or killed by the new one after a fight. The female accepted the new male and together they produced, somewhat later than in previous years, four eggs, three of which successfully hatched into one male and two female chicks.

In 2009, more than 150 people abseiled down the tower in a fund-raising event run by members of the Derby Mountain Rescue Team. Sponsored abseils have taken place most years since at least 2003, and in 2012 this included the Assistant Curate, Andy Trenier, and the Dean of Derby Cathedral, Dr John Davies.

== Cathedral Centre ==
The Derby Cathedral Centre is opposite the west doors on Irongate. It was opened by Queen Elizabeth II. It once included a café, a bookshop and an exhibition space, featuring work by local artists, but since March 2020 the shop and café have remained closed. The Cathedral Centre also houses the cathedral offices and meeting rooms.

In 2017, the Cathedral Café won the annual Derby Food and Drinks Award for Best Customer Service.

== Burials ==
- Bess of Hardwick
- Henry Cavendish
- Georgiana Cavendish, Duchess of Devonshire
- John Lombe
- William Ponsonby, 2nd Earl of Bessborough
- William Cavendish, 4th Duke of Devonshire
- Charlotte Cavendish, Marchioness of Hartington

== Cathedral clergy ==
=== Dean and Residentiary Canons ===
As of February 2025:

- Dean — Peter Robinson (since 20 July 2020 installation)
- Canon for Worship and Music — Lindsay Pearson
- Canon for Community Outreach and Social Justice — Romita Shrisunder

=== Other clergy ===
- Cathedral Chaplain — Adam Dickens (since 3 March 2014; Chaplain to the University of Derby)
- Associate Priest — Michael Futers
- Associate Priest — Dwayne Engh

== Music ==
=== Organs and organists ===
==== Organ ====
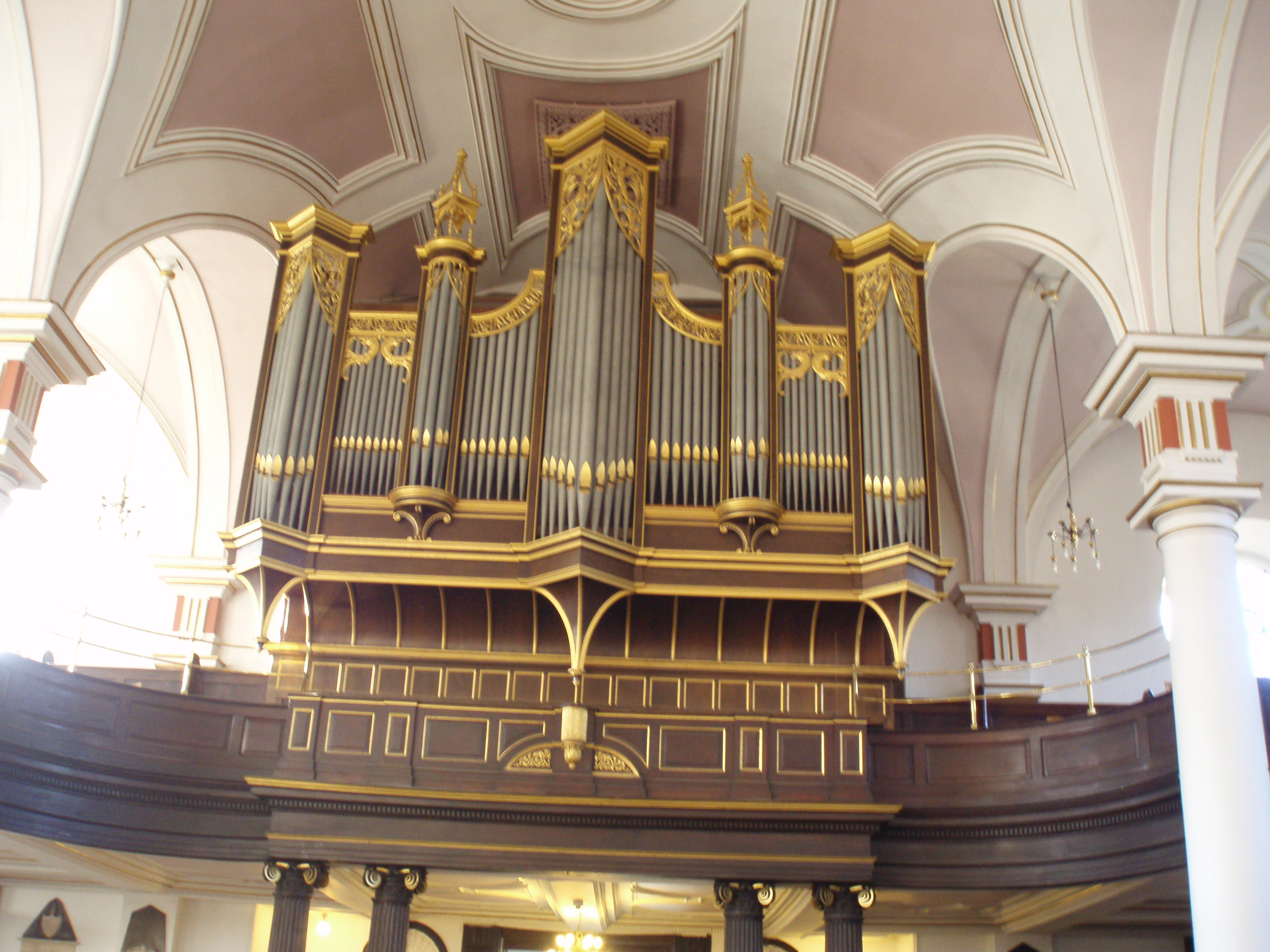
The organ

In 1939, an organ was installed by John Compton of London, although it did not gain its impressive case (designed by Sebastian Comper) until 1963. It is played from a four-manual console in the Consistory Court area of the cathedral, and was overhauled in 1992. In 1973, an additional instrument was installed in the new retroquire (east end) by Cousans of Lincoln.

==== Organists ====
Between April 2013 and December 2014, Canon Peter Gould undertook a musical pilgrimage of 270 churches, in which he raised £7,478.78 over 39 tour days, performing to a collective audience of over 3,500 people. During the tour, three church organs were found to be in a poor state.

On 4 January 2015, Canon Peter Gould resigned as Director of Music and was succeeded by Hugh Morris, who was previously director of music at Christchurch Priory. The current Director of Music, Alexander Binns, started on 1 May 2019. Binns was made an Associate of the Royal Academy of Music in April 2024. Edward Turner has been a member of staff at Derby Cathedral since 1 September 2017, and is currently Assistant Director of Music.

== Events ==
Luke Jerram's Museum of the Moon visited Derby Cathedral between October and November, 2023.

In 2022 and 2023 the Cathedral hosted and promoted mindfulness events, some related to the Museum of the Moon, led by BBC Radio Derby presenter Pam Sidhu. In 2025, she was reported as being a recruiter for a messianic cult, Educo, that used mindfulness to lure vulnerable people.

== Education ==
In 2017, Derby Cathedral announced plans to partner with the Department for Education and local authorities to open Derby's first Church of England secondary school under the name Derby Cathedral School. The school opened in 2018 and has maintained close ties to Derby Cathedral since.

== See also ==
- List of cathedrals in the United Kingdom
- Grade I listed churches in Derbyshire
- Grade I listed buildings in Derbyshire
- Listed buildings in Derby (Arboretum Ward)
