= Archdeacon of Taunton =

Church official in Somerset, England

The Archdeacon of Taunton has been, since the twelfth century, the senior ecclesiastical officer in charge of the archdeaconry of Taunton in the Diocese of Bath and Wells (in the Church of England). The archdeaconry includes seven deaneries.

== History ==
Three archdeacons were appointed in what was then the Diocese of Wells during the time at which archdeacons were first appointed across the Church of England, not long after the Norman Conquest in 1077. The earliest archdeacons of the Taunton area occur with the title "Archdeacon beyond the Parrett", until the title "Archdeacon of Taunton" occurs, around the time the diocese was renamed to Bath in 1090. That name persisted for around a century until the see was moved again in 1197 and became called the Diocese of Bath and Glastonbury; in 1219 the name was returned to Diocese of Bath. The diocese's name was finally settled at Bath and Wells and both the diocese's and the archdeaconry's names have remained stable for the 800 years since.

== List of archdeacons ==
Some archdeacons without territorial titles are recorded from around 1086; see Archdeacon of Wells.

=== High Medieval ===
Archdeacons beyond the Parrett:

- bef. 1142–aft. 1151: Hugh of Tournai
- bef. 1174–aft. 1182: Richard
- bef. 1186–bef. 1188: Ralph of Lechlade
- bef. 1189–aft. 1195: Robert de Geldford

Archdeacons of Taunton:

- bef. 1204–aft. 1217: William of Wrotham
- bef. 1217–aft. 1217: Peter of Chichester
- bef. 1221–aft. 1236: Hugh de Wilton
- bef. 1241–18 December 1263 (d.): Walter of St Quentin
- bef. 1282–aft. 1282: unnamed archdeacon
- bef. 1294–aft. 1294: William Burnell, Dean of Wells
- 16 December 1298–aft. 1300: William de Molendino

=== Late Medieval ===
- bef. 1302–aft. 1302: Peter de Averburi
- bef. 1308–bef. 1320 (d.): Henry de Schavington
- 12 December 1320–bef. 1363 (d.): Robert Hereward
- bef. 1364–aft. 1366: William Thingull
- 16 July 1370 – 1373 (res.): Thomas Arundel (became Bishop of Ely)
- bef. 1373–aft. 1373: William Cardinal de Aigrefeuille (cardinal-priest of Santo Stefano al Monte Celio)
- bef. 1383–1389 (res.): Piero Cardinal Tomacelli (cardinal-deacon of San Giorgio in Velabro; elected pope Boniface IX)
- 12 April 1390–bef. 1391: Thomas Marton
- bef. 1391–aft. 1391: Ralph Erghum
- bef. 1395–1 September 1416 (exch.): Thomas Polton
- 7 June 1395 – 1396 (res.): Thomas Sparkeford (royal grant; became Bishop of Waterford and Lismore)
- 24 May 1400: William Elleford (unsuccessful royal grant)
- 1 September 1416–bef. 1441 (d.): Nicholas Carlton
- 1 January 1441 – 1445 (res.): Adam Moleyns (became Bishop of Chichester)
- 13 February 1446 – 1450 (res.): Andrew Holes (became Archdeacon of Wells)
- 20 April 1450 – 1465 (res.): Robert Stillington (became Bishop of Bath and Wells)
- bef. 1481–1490 (d.): Richard Langport
- 12 July 1490 – 1492 (res.): Oliver King (became Bishop of Exeter)
- 18 February 1493–bef. 1496 (res.): William Worsley (became Dean of St Paul's)
- 16 December 1496 – 1505 (res.): Robert Sherborne (became Bishop of St David's)
- 27 May 1505–bef. 1509 (res.): John Ednam
- 18 August 1509 – 1522/23 (d.): Robert Honiwood
- bef. 1524–1525 (d.): John Monyns
- bef. 1526–1531 (res.): Stephen Gardiner (became Bishop of Winchester)
- ?–February 1533 (res.): Thomas Cranmer (became Archbishop of Canterbury)
- bef. 1533–1534 (res.): Rowland Lee (became Bishop of Coventry and Lichfield)
- bef. 1535–aft. 1535: Richard Sampson
- bef. 1540–aft. 1540: George Heneage
- ?–24 October 1541 (res.): John Dakyn
- 24 October 1541–bef. 1558 (d.): John Redman

=== Early modern ===
- 1551–1554 (res.): John White (became Bishop of Lincoln)
- 22 May 1554–bef. 1560 (deprived): John FitzJames (deprived)
- 1560–May 1584 (exch.): Justinian Lancaster
- 7 May 1584 – 28 October 1613 (d.): Philip Bisse
- 30 January 1587–?: Matthew Sutcliffe (probably ineffective; later Dean of Exeter)
- 15 November 1613 – 1615 (d.): Peter Lilly
- 1615–7 September 1643 (d.): Samuel Ward
- 19 December 1643 – 4 April 1682 (d.): William Piers
- 22 April 1682 – 8 June 1712 (d.): Edward Waple
- 25 July 1712 – 1726 (res.): Edmund Archer (became Archdeacon of Wells)
- 8 December 1726 – 15 December 1752 (d.): George Atwood
- 24 September 1753 – 1758 (res.): Lionel Seaman (became Archdeacon of Wells)
- 11 October 1758 – 1760 (res.): Francis Potter (became Archdeacon of Wells)
- 31 December 1760 – 1767 (res.): William Willes (became Archdeacon of Wells)
- 27 October 1767 – 17 August 1780 (d.): Thomas Camplin
- 19 September 1780 – 28 March 1817 (d.): John Turner
- 19 April 1817 – 13 October 1827 (d.): George Trevelyan
- 5 December 1827 – 10 September 1851 (d.): Anthony Hamilton
- 30 September 1851 – 21 March 1896 (d.): George Denison

=== Late modern ===
- 1896–5 June 1903 (d.): Alexander Ainslie
- 1903–9 April 1911 (d.): William Askwith, Vicar of St Mary Magdalene, Taunton
- 1911–1938 (ret.): Charles de Salis, Bishop suffragan of Taunton (until 1930) then assistant bishop
- 1938–1950 (ret.): Arnold Fitch, Rector of Angersleigh from 1946
- 1951–1971 (ret.): Geoffrey Hilder, Vicar of Hambridge until 1959
- 1971–1977 (ret.): Arthur Hopley (afterwards archdeacon emeritus)
- 1977–1992 (ret.): Leonard Olyott (afterwards archdeacon emeritus)
- 1992–1998 (res.): Richard Frith
- 1999–30 June 2016 (ret.): John Reed
- 23 June–1 October 2016 (acting): Andrew Tatham
- 1 October 2016–present: Simon Hill

== Sources ==
- Greenway, Diana E. (2001), Fasti Ecclesiae Anglicanae 1066–1300, vol. 7, pp. 35–38
- Jones, B. (1964), Fasti Ecclesiae Anglicanae 1300–1541, vol. 8, pp. 16–17
- Horn, Joyce M. (1979), Fasti Ecclesiae Anglicanae 1541–1857, vol. 5, pp. 16–18
