= John the Saracen (disambiguation) =

John the Saracen (Iohannes Saracenus) may refer to:

- John Sarrazin (John the Saracen), 12th-century translator of Greek texts into Latin
- John the Saracen (chamberlain), servant of Louis IX of France
- John the Saracen (archbishop of Bari), ruled 1259–80
- John the Moor (John the Saracen), chamberlain of the Holy Roman Empire under Frederick II
- John Saracenus, papal subdeacon and chaplain, dean of Wells (1245–48)
- John the Saracen, procurator of the convent of Saint-Maur-des-Fossés at Rome 1253
- John the Saracen, papal subdeacon and magister, canon of Limoges in 1253
