= Henry Ryder (disambiguation) =

Henry Ryder (1777–1836) was a British clergyman, Bishop of Gloucester then Lichfield.

Henry Ryder may also refer to:

- Henry Ryder (priest) (died 1755), British clergyman, Archdeacon of Derby
- Henry Ryder, 4th Earl of Harrowby (1836–1900), British peer and banker
- Henry Ignatius Dudley Ryder (1837–1907), British Roman Catholic clergyman

== See also ==
- Henry Rider (died 1696), Anglo-Irish clergyman, Bishop of Killaloe
- H. Rider Haggard (1856–1925), British author
