= Ralph Barlow =

Ralph Barlow may refer to:

- Ralph Barlow (footballer)
- Ralph Barlow (priest)
