= Leonius =

Leonius may refer to:

- Léonin (fl. 1150s — d. ? 1201), the first known significant composer of polyphonic organum;
- the author of a versified Historia Sacra, found in a manuscript of the Bibliothèque Nationale in Paris (see Leonine verse)
- the probably apocryphal inventor of Leonine verse, if different from either or both of the preceding two persons
- Leonius (Dean of Wells), fl. 1213
