= William of Wrotham =

13th-century English sheriff and royal official

- Archdeacon of Taunton
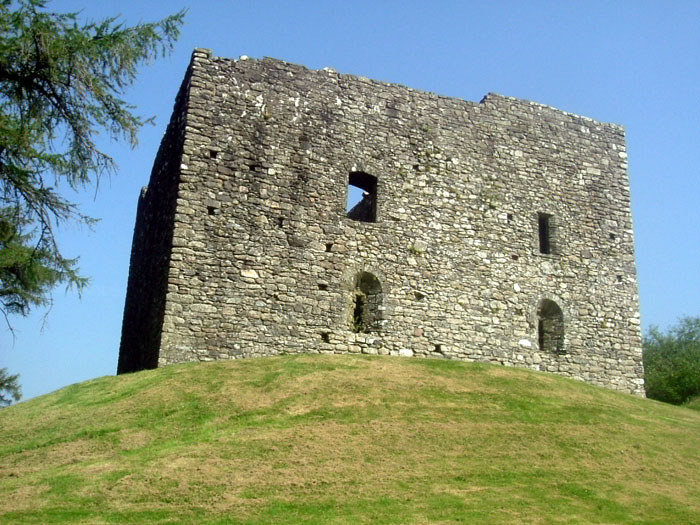
- Ruins of Lydford Castle, which was in William's custody
- Installed: 1204
- Term ended: c. 1217
- Predecessor: Robert de Geldford
- Successor: Peter

Personal details
- Born: William
- Died: probably before 2 December 1217
- Parents: Godwin

William of Wrotham or William de Wrotham (died c. 1217) was a medieval English royal administrator and clergyman. Although a late 13th-century source says that William held a royal office under King Henry II of England (reigned 1154–1189), the first contemporary reference to William is in 1197, when he became responsible for, among other things, the royal tin mines. He also held ecclesiastical office, eventually becoming Archdeacon of Taunton, and served King John of England as an administrator of ecclesiastical lands and a collector of taxes.

William's main administrative work was naval. He was in charge of the royal fleet in the south of England in 1205, and was one of those responsible for the development of Portsmouth as a naval dockyard. He continued to be involved in naval matters until 1214 or later, but by 1215 he had joined the First Barons' War against John. After John's death in 1216, William returned to the royalist cause. He probably died in late 1217. Known to a contemporary chronicler as one of John's "evil advisers", William is said by modern historians to have had a "special responsibility for ports, customs, and the navy", and was "keeper of ports", a forerunner of the office of First Lord of the Admiralty.

== Early life ==
Little is known of William's background or family, except that his father Godwin held land in Shipbourne, near Wrotham in Kent, perhaps as a vassal of the Archbishops of Canterbury. William's brother Richard was named as William's deputy in 1207.

According to late 13th-century documents, the Hundred Rolls, King Henry II gave William the office of steward of Exmoor, and lands at North Petherton, Somerset. William held the prebend of St Decumans in the cathedral chapter of Bath Cathedral by 9 May 1204. He claimed to have held the office since 1194 during a later dispute with Savaric fitzGeldewin, the Bishop of Bath and another canon of the cathedral, Roger Porretanus, who claimed the prebend. By 23 December 1205, William had secured a papal judgement against Roger.

William may have owed his advancement in royal service to Geoffrey fitzPeter, a royal judge. In 1197, he granted William a manor at Sutton-at-Hone, Kent, which later was supposed to become a hospital, but instead eventually became a preceptory for the Knights Hospitaller. From 1197, William was responsible for the collection of revenues from Geoffrey's lands at Lydford, Devon, and held the office of chief forester of Somerset; it is unclear to whom he owed that position.

== Royal service ==
In 1197, Hubert Walter, who was Archbishop of Canterbury and Justiciar, appointed William to the administration of the royal stannaries, or tin mines, and in 1198 William was placed in charge of tin production, an office later known as the Lord Warden of the Stannaries. Under his control, the mines became much more lucrative for the king, and accounted for a total of £1100 in William's first year of administration. As part of his administrative work, he became the first warden of Lydford Castle after it was constructed in the 1190s. (Note: The castle served as a prison for the administrators of the stannaries besides its other functions.) In 1199 he was involved in a dispute over the stannaries with another official, Hugh Bardulf, temporarily losing control of them – along with his office as sheriff – in 1200. The reason for the loss of these offices is uncertain. After restoration to office, he remained as Lord Warden of the Stannaries until 1215.

In 1198 and 1199, William was Sheriff of Devon and Sheriff of Cornwall, along with another royal servant, and served as a royal justice. (Note: His fellow sheriff was John de Torrington.) In 1200 he was recorded as a receiver of the carucage, a tax on land, in the Pipe roll; whether this meant that he was a local or a national collector of the tax is unclear. By 12 September 1204, William was Archdeacon of Taunton in the Diocese of Bath, and he witnessed the election of Jocelin of Wells as the new bishop of the diocese. He was jointly placed in charge of the mints of London and Canterbury in 1205, along with Reginald de Cornhill, with whom he also shared the collection of the tax of a fifteenth on merchants, a post the two had held since 1202. (Note: This tax was imposed on the imports and exports of merchants. William and Reginald also shared this office with William of Furnell.) In May 1205 William, along with de Cornhill, was given custody of one of three dies for the mint at Chichester; in July the king gave William's custody to Simon of Wells, the Bishop of Chichester. William was one of the officials in charge of the collection of a tax of a thirteenth in 1207. (Note: This tax was assessed as a shilling for each mark's worth of property owned.)

William was also placed in charge of vacant ecclesiastical offices, collecting their revenues for the king. He performed this office for the Diocese of Worcester around 1200, the Diocese of Winchester in 1204, for Glastonbury Abbey in 1205, and for Whitby Abbey in 1206 and 1209. From his actions, it can be assumed that Wrotham was a member of the royal household, probably working in the wardrobe.

== Naval administration ==
William's main administrative work concerned the navy. In 1204 he, de Cornhill, and William of Furnell were placed in charge of granting wool export licences. William of Wrotham was also one of the officials charged with supervising the ships dispatched to the coasts in 1204, (Note: His fellow supervisors of the ships in 1204 were Reginald de Cornhill, William Marsh, and John la Warr.) after the loss of Normandy exposed England to invasion by the French. In 1205, he was again one of the keepers of the royal fleet along the south coast. William was in charge of the 17 ships based in Romney, Rye, Shoreham, Southampton, Winchelsea, and Exeter, while the rest of the fleet came under Cornhill's control. (Note: The ships under Cornhill numbered 10 and were based in London, Newhaven, and Sandwich.) In the same year, he was also in charge of naval spending for the attempted invasion of France, which in June alone totalled over 470 pounds. William surrendered custody of Taunton Castle to Peter de Taraton in July and was in charge of purchasing the royal wine in August. No further naval duties are recorded until November, when, along with Cornhill, he was responsible for assessing the ports.

In 1206, William was in charge of the naval forces in the Cinque Ports and commanded the fleet that invaded Poitou. Whether he accompanied the fleet or stayed in England after it sailed is unclear; according to two historians – F. W. Brooks and R. W. Powell – it is more likely he stayed. From 1206 until 1215, he was effectively commander of King John's navy, and helped to develop Portsmouth as a royal dockyard. In 1208, William was put in charge of ensuring that no ships sailed without royal permission. That year he also oversaw the naval preparations made by the Cinque Ports. The purpose of these preparations is unknown; the Annals of Dunstable ascribe to John a desire to oppress the Cinque Ports. During May 1208 a royal order was issued that William's deputies in all the seaports should seize any ships in the ports that were from foreign countries, excluding Denmark, Norway and other countries that did not oppose John's diplomatic efforts. A gap in the governmental records does not allow a detailed view of William's activities for the next few years, until 1212, when William is shown performing many of the same duties as earlier. He was in charge of the repair of some ships and the construction of a large new ship, named the Deulabenit, owned by the king. William was also responsible for impressing privately owned merchant ships into royal service. These ships were used in the naval action of the Battle of Damme at Zwyn in 1213, when a fleet under William Longespee, the Earl of Salisbury, destroyed a substantial French naval force and sacked the town of Damme.

In late 1213, William was directing the efforts of the seaports of south-western England and the Cinque Ports in naval affairs. He was also responsible for the setting up of a supply depot for the navy in June 1213, for which he received supplies from the diocese of Chichester. In 1214 William had custody of some royal prisoners. The same year, the king ordered him to return a merchant ship if he had indeed seized it from its owner, Joscelin de Hampton. Also in 1214, William co-founded the hospital of Domus Dei in Portsmouth with Peter des Roches, the Bishop of Winchester. The foundation was confirmed by the king in October 1214.

John rewarded William for his service with churches in Sheppey and East Malling, which were granted in 1207, (Note: William received the ecclesiastical revenues from these churches, a common practice.) and the right to oversee the royal forests in Cornwall and Devon. Other grants included lands in Dartford and Sutton-at-Hone that had escheated to the crown, lands in Westminster, and a prebend in the royal ecclesiastical foundation at Hastings.

== Later years and legacy ==
During John's reign, Pope Innocent III placed an interdict on England, forbidding public celebration of sacred rites in English churches. William supported John and remained in England. The medieval chronicler Roger of Wendover named William as one of John's "evil advisers", or "most wicked counsellors". Modern historians argue that Roger's account of John's reign, while containing some truth, was written to defame men who were prominent in the early years of King Henry III, John's son, who had succeeded his father in October 1216. According to Nicholas Vincent, while Roger's account of the exactions and crimes of the members of his list of evil advisers certainly had a strong basis of truth, it was also greatly exaggerated. W. L. Warren agrees and points out that many of the details of Roger's accounts that can be checked with other records are wrong, making the other parts of his stories suspect.

In 1215, William joined the baronial rebellion against John, and lost his naval offices, the royal forester's office for Somerset, and custody of Lydford Castle. In May 1216, the king offered William a safe conduct, which noted that William had fled overseas. The letters were witnessed by Peter des Roches. In mid-1217, William rejoined the royalist cause, returning to the side of Henry III. This action regained him some of his lost lands.

William last appeared in documents on 25 July 1217 and was dead by 16 February 1218, probably before 2 December 1217, when someone else is mentioned as archdeacon. On 16 February 1218, John Marshall became the guardian of Richard, William's nephew and heir, who was the son of William's brother Richard.

William has been described as having a "special responsibility for ports, customs, and the navy" by the historian Robert Bartlett. He is usually given the title of "keeper of ports" or "keeper of galleys", which Ralph Turner equates with being First Lord of the Admiralty in later history. Sometimes this would be given as "custos portum maris" in Latin, or "keeper of the seaports". At other times he was titled "keeper of the king's ships". Bartlett also called William "one of the king's most important administrators". Charles Young said that William's service to King John was a "distinguished administrative career", and J. E. A. Joliffe called William one of the "greatest of the king's clerks".
