= William Grahme =

Dean of Carlisle

William Grahme or William Graham (died 4 February 1713) was Dean of Carlisle from 1684 until 1704; and of Wells from then until his death in 1713.

He was joint Clerk of the Closet from 1702 until his death.

Church of England titles
| Preceded by Thomas Musgrave | Dean of Carlisle; 1686–1704 | Succeeded by Francis Atterbury |
| Preceded by Ralph Bathurst | Dean of Wells; 1704–1713 | Succeeded by Matthew Brailsford |
