= George Warburton (priest) =

George Warburton (c. 1580-1641) was the Dean of Wells Cathedral from August 1631 to his death in December, 1641, and a JP for Somerset from 1633-1640.

== Early life and family ==
George Warburton was born around the year 1580 in the county Cheshire in England. Though his parents are unknown, he was related to the Warburtons of Cheshire, a lower gentry family. After the Restoration of Charles II in 1660, one of Warburton's nephews was promoted to the Baronetage. Antiquarian Anthony Wood refers to George Warburton as "a Cheshire man born of an ancient Family," indicating his gentility.

Warburton matriculated to Brasenose College at the University of Oxford in March 1595 when he was fifteen years old. Two other Warburtons from Cheshire, both named Peter, also matriculated to Brasenose at Oxford within a decade of George's arrival at the college, indicating some familial connection with the college. George Warburton received his B.A. in 1598, and stayed on at the university to receive his M.A. in 1603. Warburton would eventually receive a D.D. halfway through his tenure as Dean of Wells in 1636. Despite receiving his M.A. in 1603, Warbuton did not take up a position in the Church of England for nearly a decade, when he was ordained as a Deacon in 1613 by Bishop John Bridges. Bridges ordained Warburton as a priest the following July, when George took up his first living in the rectory at Longworth in the Diocese of Salisbury.

== Ecclesiastical Career ==
At some point between receiving his M.A. and his appointment at Longworth, Warburton had started making connections with lower level gentry in Berkshire and London. An Edward Fisher, Esq. of London and Thomas Leake, Esq. of Longworth both stood as Warburton’s patrons when he received the living in Longworth. Their title of Esquire placed both men within the lower gentry, and Warburton’s education made him useful as a clerk. Warburton worked with Thomas Leake in a pleading regarding his lands in Longworth, and he may have assisted in land deals between Leake and Fisher. Warburton managed to ingratiate himself with powerful men, as he had been appointed a chaplain in ordinary to King James I by the end of 1621. The position of chaplain in ordinary was a stepping stone to higher promotion in the Early Stuart Church, as nearly 40% of the king's chaplains in 1621 went on to be Bishops in the church. Warburton was responsible for being physically attendant on the King for the month of November, as well as conducting daily divine service, biweekly communion, and was expected to preach twice per month. Along with this new office, Warburton was transferred to the more lucrative office as Rector of Freshwater on the Isle of Wight. Warburton told a visiting Lieutenant Hammond in 1634 that the parsonage was worth £300 per year, which was much higher than his previous living at Longworth.

During Warburton's time as rector of Freshwater he published his only known work, a sermon titled King Melchizedech (sic). The work was an expanded version of a sermon he gave on 2 September 1623 at East Hamstead House before the Royal court. The beginning of the sermon is an academic exercise explaining who Melchizedek was in the Bible, and how to properly read him in multiple layers. Warburton goes on to display a rudimentary knowledge of Greek and Hebrew before getting to the purpose he gave for his sermon. Warburton writes in his letter to the reader that he is publishing the sermon to show his thankfulness for the "happie peace" that England enjoyed. This was a directly political statement in support of James I's foreign policy program. Five years earlier, a rebellion broke out in Bohemia, where the estates tried to replace the king-elect Ferdinand II with Frederick V of the Palatinate. Ferdinand used imperial troops to suppress the rebellion, and defeated the Palatinate and Bohemian army in 1620 at the Battle of White Mountain. The violence escelated in 1620 when Ambrogio Spinola invaded the southern Palatinate.

King James was trying to solidify a peace with the Spanish Monarchy through a marriage between his son, Prince Charles and the Infanta Maria Anna. The increasing hostilities on the continent, combined with latent anti-Spanish sentiment in England made peaceful relations with Spain difficult for James. He publicly pursued a path of English neutrality, despite his religious sympathies with Frederick and the fact that in 1613, Frederick had married James' daughter Elizabeth James was pushing a policy against many in England who argued that England should take a more active stance in support of the Palatinate. Some of his more vocal opponents included members of the clergy. Warburton was one of several priests who used their sermons to push for the neutral and peaceful position, including men such as John Donne and Richard Gardiner. Warburton castigated both extremes of the religious spectrum involved in stoking the fires in Europe. He blames the violence and war on two opposing extremes: the Jesuits on one end, and the Puritans (though refers to them as those "inflamed with a precipitate zeale") as the other. Warburton encouraged the path of moderation that the Church of England represented under James by making this distinction. Warburton's public support likely placed him in line for future promotions, as other preachers like Donne and Gardiner received the king's favor after openly supporting the King's plans in public. Others, like Richard Sheldon lost the King's favor by taking stands against royal policy during their sermons.

Warburton would vie for further promotions and livings over the following decade. In 1625, he asked Edward Conway, then Secretary of State to have King James write him a letter of recommendation to the Bishop of Winchester. Warburton had already received A "presentation" from the King to the rectory of Shorwell on the Isle of Wight, but his request was contested by a Mr. Leigh (likely Sir John Leigh or his father). Leigh wrote to Conway four days after Warburton, and it seems Leigh's letter won the day, as the next appointment to the post was a Henry Leigh, either the son or grandson of Sir John Leigh. Warburton's request for more position likely derived from the debts he was accruing. He wrote Sir John Oglander on 20 April 1625 asking for a loan, admitting that he already owed Oglander's sister money. Warburton did end up paying Oglander back, which was a relief to Oglander as "he is ye kinges Chaplayne and his bodie free from arrest."

== Deanship and Religious Outlook ==
Warburton's promotion finally came in June 1631, when he was installed as the new Dean of Gloucester. Warburton only held the position for about two months, as another deanship opened in late July at Wells Cathedral by the death of their dean, Ralph Barlow. Warburton had been a chaplain to Charles I since his coronation, and the Deanship of Wells had greater wealth and political influence than the cathedral at Gloucester. Charles took a more active role in enforcing a religious conformity within the churches than his father had . By mid-1632, Charles had his Secretary of State, Sir John Coke, write the Dean and Chapter at Wells to procure "decent ornaments as are requisite' for their communion table. This request was part of Charles' (and later Archbishop Laud's program of beautification, which required churches to place their communion tables altarwise in a railed off area in the west of the church. The policy was not fully implemented in the cathedrals until the mid-1630s, but the request for a further ornamentality at Wells in 1632 is indicative of the shift in religious policy. The letter was speedily complied with.

After his promotion to the Archbishopric, William Laud set up visitations at three of the Cathedrals within his archdiocese: Wells, Exeter, and Bristol. The questionnaire posed at Wells reveals the importance of traditional and visual aspects of worship to both Laud and Charles. Warburton gives a full list of all the cloths, flagons, and copes held in the church. Most of the vestments, silver plate, and brass monuments had been removed from the church during the reign of Edward VI. Warburton did not express any concerns regarding the imposition of new ceremonial requirements within the Cathedral. His Bishop, William Piers, was a close ally of Laud. He actively promoted the new style of moving communion tables, and railing them off from the main body of the church. Warburton and Piers never seem to have come into conflict during the near ten years they ministered to the church.

Warburton's main personal conflicts were not with the crown or his bishop, but were instead within his own Chapter. Two of the cathedral canons, Samuel Ward and John Young, were considered non-resident within the Cathedral, but still received their income of their positions. Warburton made a large issue of this in 1634 for John Young, who was also Dean of Winchester, and debated the issue at length in one of the Chapter meetings. Ward was lecturing at the University of Cambridge, and both men were eventually able to keep their non-residency dispensations. Warburton's main adversary within the Cathedral was a Dr. Gerard Wood. Wood was likely more Calvinist and austere in his theology compared to Warburton. Bishop Piers would reprimand Wood in 1640 for the content of one of his sermons, though what exactly was at issue was left unsaid. Warburton and Wood frequently fought over trivial items, such as Wood's attempt to build a stable and wash-house on consecrated ground. Bishop Piers sided with Wood in this dispute, as the land was not consecrated, and there was no wash-house. A disagreement between Warburton and Wood occurred in September 1632. Warburton argued that those preaching within the Cathedral should use the stone pulpit in the body of the church with proper cloth, whereas Wood stated he would preach from the choir section without any adornment on the pulpit. The disagreement was one of power rather than theological difference, but that did not stop Warburton from citing Wood in a letter to Laud, then Bishop of London, that Wood never "kneeled at prayer, or did any reverence either toward the Altar, or at the name of Jesus."

Warburton served as Chaplain in ordinary to King James from at least 1621 until the King's death. He further served King Charles until 1639, but was dismissed on 6 November 1639 for unknown reasons. Warburton also served as a JP for the county of Somerset from 1633 to at least 1640, as well as the Lord on the manor court for Wellington and Buckland. He served both courts without serious issue; most of the tasks handled for both courts were routine. Warburton attended the Convocation of 1640 in person, but used Samuel Baker, procurator of London as a proxy in 1641. Warburton likely intended to be at the Convocation in 1641 in person, as he was in London at the time. He likely was indisposed for a significant portion of the session, as he was listed as absent, and eventually died on Drury Lane in December 1641.
