= Sibyl Harton =

Sibyl Harton (1898–1993) was a major Church of England writer during the twentieth century. She was a correspondent with Thomas Merton during the 1960s, and visited him at the Abbey of Our Lady of Gethsemani in Bardstown, Kentucky. She is generally associated with an Anglo-Catholic perspective in theological writing. Harton was a frequent contributor to The Living Church magazine in the United States and published book reviews in English theological periodicals. She was a popular retreat director in the Episcopal Church during the 1960s and 1970s, and a vocal opponent of the ordination of women to the priesthood.

She was the wife and widow of Frederic Harton (1889-1958), Dean of Wells, a theological author in his own right who made significant adaptation of French- and Italian-language spiritual writing into an Anglican reading context.

== Bibliography ==
- In Pursuit of Perfection: A Way of Christian Life (1936)
- Once upon a Bed-time: Being Fifty-two Delectable Stories from the Bible for the Want-to-be-read-tos (1937)
- A Child's Faith: Fifty-two Lessons (1938)
- Spiritual Direction: A Practical Essay (1944)
- The Sufferings of Christ: A Diurnal of Prayer for Lent (1945)
- The Way of the Cross Arranged for Private Devotion (1947)
- In Company with Jesus (1948)
- In Search of Quiet: The Development and Practice of Private Retreat (1955)
- On Growing Old: A Book of Preparation for Old Age (1957)
- Busy My Heart with Quietude (1961)
- The Practice of Confession: Why, What, How (1961)
- Stars Appearing: Lives of Sixty-eight Saints of the Anglican Calendar (1962)
- To Make Intercession (1964)
- Doors of Eternity (1965)
- Windfall of Light: A Study of the Vocation of Mother Eva Mary, CT (1968)
