= Caroline Frances Ricketts =

- Baptised: 30 August 1813
- Died: January 28, 1880; Putney
- Spouse: William Fell Ricketts
- Parents: Robert Lukin (father); Catherine Halifax (mother)

Caroline Frances Ricketts (1813 – 28 January 1880) was a British novelist.

She was born Caroline Frances Lukin, the eldest daughter of Robert Lukin (son of George Lukin) and Catherine Halifax (daughter of Samuel Hallifax). In 1840, she married the Rev. William Fell Ricketts, rector of Kibworth. He died in 1844 and she never remarried.

In the 1850s and 1860s, Ricketts published four novels. They were generally well-received. However, The Athenaeum called her novel The Crawfords (1862) "rather stupid than interesting."

Caroline Frances Lukin died on 28 January 1880 in Putney.

== Bibliography ==
- Trials: or, Life's Lessons. A Series of Domestic Tales. 1 vol. London: Ward and Lock, 1855.
- Under the Lime Trees. 1 vol. London: L. Booth, 1857.
- Colonel Repton's Daughters: A Tale of Everyday Life. 1 vol. London: L. Booth, 1860.
- The Crawfords: A Tale. 1 vol. London: L. Booth, 1862.
