= Benjamin Heydon =

British headmaster

Benjamin Heydon or Haydon (1567–1607) was the Headmaster at Winchester College from 1596 to 1601/1602, a JP for Somerset, and Dean of Wells Cathedral from 1602 until his death in 1607.

== Early life and family ==
Benjamin Heydon was born in Winchester in the early autumn of 1567 to Edward (d. 1581) and Edyth Heydon (d. 1583). He was baptized in St. Swithun-upon-Kingsgate on 23 October 1567. Heydon had two older brothers, Francis and Edward, and two sisters, Martha and Mary. Benjamin spent his first ten years in Winchester with his family. When he was eleven, he entered Winchester College in 1578 and studied there until April 1586.

His father, Edward, came to Winchester soon after Elizabeth I took the throne when she granted him a prebendary at Winchester Cathedral. Edward Heydon had a chequered career, and had held multiple offices under Henry VIII, Edward VI, and Mary I of England. After receiving his Bachelor of Canon Law in 1527, he served successively as rector of Ardley, Coln Rogers, Newbury and Coberley, among others. In 1546, Archbishop Cranmer granted Edward a dispensation to hold three concurrent benefices, and Edward was listed as a chaplain to Henry VIII. After the death of Henry VIII, the church took a series of unconnected disciplinary actions against him for various political mistakes and religious heterodoxy. Princess Elizabeth in 1551 removed Edward from his position in Newbury in favour of her chaplain, Edmund Allen. Earlier in 1550, the parishioners of Newbury complained to their Bishop John Capon that Heydon could not preach according to the Book of Common Prayer (1549), and continued to affirm that the bread of the Eucharist was "Christ's true body." Historian C. W. Field argues that Elizabeth removed Heydon because he prevented more reformed ministers from preaching in Newbury. Heydon maintained his belief in transubstantiation as late as 1562, when he was summoned before Bishop Richard Cheyney's court for his beliefs. Heydon did adopt some new practices raised during the reformation, including clerical marriage. In 1553, Heydon was receiving a pension valued at £3 per year as a former religious who was married. After Mary began to reinstate traditional Catholic practices, Heydon was deprived in 1554 from his benefice in St Benet's, Paul's Wharf in London, likely for being married. In 1563, the churchwardens at Tortworth complained that Heydon failed to properly perform the common prayers required by the laity. Heydon resigned his benefice in Tortworth in 1567 and spent the remainder of his life as prebend of Winchester. He died in 1581. Edyth, mother of Benjamin and wife of Edward, died in late 1583, and the will was proved in 1584. The majority of Edward and Edyth's belongings were divided among their living children, Benjamin, Francis, Edward Jr., Martha, and Mary.

Benjamin’s brother Francis may have followed their father into the priesthood. One Francis Heydon or Heyden received his MA from Corpus Christi College, Oxford in 1575, and then became the rector of Broadwater in Sussex. This Francis may have been Edward's son, as Edward resigned his benefices at Charfield in 1574 and Winnall, Hampshire in 1580 to allow Francis to assume those benefices. Francis was not able to retain the incumbencies in Winnall and Charfield as he did not have a dispensation to hold multiple benefices; he would instead remain at Broadwater until he died in 1625. The churchwardens' complaints to the bishop indicate that Francis performed his duties lacklusterly until the final few years of his life.

Benjamin's other elder brother, Edward Heydon Jr., built up his landed wealth from his inheritance from his father and mother. Edward was baptized on 3 February 1566 in the same church as Benjamin: St. Swithun's in Winchester. Edward Sr. and Edyth granted the families' property in Maiden Bradley, Wiltshire to Edward Jr., who had maintained Maiden Bradley as his primary residence while he accumulated more land. He married Dorothea Manning of Kent in the late 1590s. Her family was among the well-to-do in Kent, and had been granted an heraldry by Elizabeth in 1577. Edward ingratiated himself into the family and served as an executor in her brother, Henry Manning's will, in 1614. By this time, Edward was considered a gentleman, and had added several estates to his name. Edward likely died in late 1627, and his will was proved on 22 November 1627. Mary Heydon married sometime between 1581 and 1583 to a Mr. Philpott, and Martha’s subsequent fate is unknown.

== Education and career ==
Benjamin's education at Winchester College provided him an academic path to advancement. Edward Sr. lost much of his influence and potential patronage when he was brought before courts for controversial religious opinions, and he surrendered various benefices to Francis before Benjamin finished his education. Winchester College was one of the best grammar schools in England, rivalled only by Eton College. Winchester, from the time of its foundation, was intimately connected to New College, Oxford, and at least seventy of the entrants to New College had to be drawn from Winchester. Throughout the sixteenth century, university education became key to advancement in the church. By the end of Elizabeth's reign, a plurality of clergy had obtained some university education, if not full degrees, and Benjamin was eager to take advantage. Heydon matriculated to New College in 1586 and received his BA in April 1589, and an MA in January 1593. Benjamin remained at New College for the next two years, but was unable to complete his studies for a Doctor of Divinity. Before the 19th century, university fellows studying theology were not allowed to be married. Though no official records of his marriage exist, Heydon appears to have been married sometime around 1595 based on the age of his children later in life. Heydon would eventually get a degree as Doctor of Divinity in July 1605.

After leaving Oxford in 1596, Heydon returned to Winchester College to take up the position of headmaster. It was as headmaster of Winchester that he likely first came into contact with William Lord Burghley and Robert Cecil; both father and son had an interest in Winchester College. William Lord Burghley accepted the role of Steward of the college in 1566 and held the post until his death in 1598. The two took also were concerned with the results of the 1596 election of the provost of the college; the same year that Heydon took his office. Robert Cecil was invaluable to Heydon throughout the remainder of his career, and he likely owed his appointment to the Deanship of Wells to Cecil. Heydon likely had at least one son begin attending Winchester College by the end of his term as headmaster: in 1598 and 1601, Heydon was charged for the cost of the entrance and boarding for at least one unnamed person, which T. F. Kirby argued was Heydon's son.

Heydon served as headmaster at Winchester until sometime in 1601. He left to become Dean of Wells Cathedral in 1602, and was confirmed in November of that year. The Deanery of Wells was a prominent position within the Elizabethan church and tended to be held either by prominent statesmen in the government, or by those who had excellent political connections. The previous two deans, Valentine Dale and Sir John Herbert held prominent positions in Elizabeth's government; Dale served as an ambassador to France and the Low Countries and Master of the Court of Requests during his tenure as dean. John Herbert was an ambassador to France, Denmark, Prussia, and the Hanseatic League, succeeded Dale as Master of the Court of Requests, and served as a judge on the High Court of Admiralty. Herbert also served Elizabeth as her Secretary of State and as a member of her Privy Council beginning in 1600. Although Dale and Herbert had administrative talent, both were frequently away from the cathedral, and often directed the operations through letters or through the sub-dean. Their perpetual absences contributed to the material decay of the cathedral, and a general decrease in revenue from church lands. Heydon would spend much of his energy and money trying to restore the church and regain lost lands.

Heydon’s major project during his time as Dean of Wells was to restore the ancient lands and rents due to the cathedral that it had lost in the mid-16th century. When Edward, Duke of Somerset rose to power in 1547 and 1548, he augmented his wealth by seizing church lands. Somerset became Lord Protector soon after Henry’s death, using his newfound authority to further the reformation in England, and to further line his pockets. In July 1547, Somerset granted himself extensive lands of the bishop and cathedral of Wells. Somerset stripped thousands of pounds of revenue from both the bishopric and deanery during his brief period as Protector. The loss of income from ancestral church lands and the persistent absences of previous deans left the cathedral in a dilapidated state.

One of the wealthier manors and rectories acquired by Somerset was that of Wedmore. The manor had an annual revenue of about £38 during the reign of Edward VI, and the rectory's annual revenue in 1563 was of £70. These two revenue streams were the largest of all the cathedral's holdings. Wedmore and the surrounding area had belonged to the deanery since c.1150 when Bishop Robert of Lewes reorganized the lands of his bishopric to create the deanery. After Somerset's fall and attainder in 1551, the land reverted to the crown. The manor of Wedmore was granted back to the Deanery in 1560, and the Rectory was granted three years later. The act of attainder, an earlier surrender and re-grant of the deanery under William Fitzwilliam (Dean of Wells), and a surrender and re-grant of the deanery’s lands under Valentine Dale made the legal standing of the deanery and its title to the lands vulnerable. Heydon’s predecessor, John Herbert, used his legal expertise and influence at court to secure a new charter, giving the deanery sound legal footing. Heydon brought suit against Dale's descendants, who claimed that Wedmore belonged to their family based on the terms of the re-grant issued to Dale. Heydon solicited help from his patron, Robert Cecil, and legal advice (through Cecil) from Edward Coke. The numerous lawsuits drained Heydon’s personal and professional finances to the point that he died £1,400 in debt to his brother Edward.

== Conflicts with the King, Church, and Puritans ==
As Dean of one of the wealthiest Collegiate churches, Heydon was bound to encounter the elite of England. Prebendaries attached to, and positions as canons in, a collegiate church were well paid livings for a cleric, and an excellent way for those with power to dispense patronage. As an example, Elizabeth I herself had presented Heydon for the deanship in 1602, as was her right by royal prerogative. James VI and I similarly expected to be able to nominate men to positions within the church, and in November 1605, he recommended Robert Wright and William Barker, then serving as treasurer and chancellor of the cathedral, respectively. Heydon was brought before the Archbishop Richard Bancroft in May, 1606 to argue his case regarding his failure to appoint Wright and Barker. His arguments failed to convince the Archbishop, and he was admonished and ordered to instate the men to their requested appointments as soon as there were available vacancies for both men. Despite dragging his feet, Heydon and the college eventually conceded and appointed Wright and Barker to the college. The appointment process for Wright and Barker took over two years, and during that time, Heydon, along with two others, was summoned before the Convocation of Canterbury. Heydon and his allies were suspended from performing their function as priests in the church, though no specific reasoning is given. They were labelled as "contumacious", meaning failing to respond appropriately to a summons. This may have been a failure to arrive to the Convocation in a timely manner but is likely related to their perceived insubordination against the King's and Archbishop's requests. All three were reinstated within a few weeks, but the Archbishop had made his point clear that Heydon was to behave as an obedient priest to Bancroft and a subject of James I.

Heydon did not leave any writings or publications to describe his theological beliefs. His doctoral examination in Theology in 1605 were straightforward and simple for almost any clergyman in the late Elizabethan or early Stuart church, and not indicative of any controversial theological positions. Heydon was not a Puritan, which is indicated by his participation in traditional revels that most Puritans despised. The most infamous and well-recorded incident was the May Games in 1607. The town decided to use the May Games that year to hold a church ale to raise funds to repair the damaged tower of St Cuthbert's Church, Wells. Heydon, as county JP, approved the event in defiance of an order of 1594 against the holding of church ales, as they were seen as often debauched, drunken, and disorderly. Prominent local Puritans, John Yarde and John Hole, opposed the ale, along with the bishop, John Still. Still was not a Puritan, but was concerned with effective administration and preventing the disorder that characterized church ales. Heydon defied the puritanical restrictions against ales, and actively supported the games, which mocked Yarde, Hole, and other Puritans in the town. Heydon went so far as to have "cathedral choristers, dressed as pagan goddesses singing sacred hymns, and miners in unflattering costumes, posing as prominent local Puritans," as part of the pageantry. After the end of the May Games, John Hole brought a defamation suit against several of the leading townsmen promoting the ale in the court of Star Chamber. Heydon's participation and central place at many events during the games indicate he was sympathetic to traditional popular culture. Although he was certainly against the perceived cultural restraints of Puritanism, there is also no evidence that he was a participant in the rising tide of anti-Calvinism or Arminianism.

Heydon died in early November 1607, deeply in debt to his brother as the various lawsuits over the estates of the Cathedral and Deanery, and the defamation suit in Star Chamber continued. He predeceased his wife, and the fate of his children is unknown.
