= Edmund Archer =

Edmund Archer may refer to:

- Edmund Archer (priest) (1673–1739), English Anglican Archdeacon
- Edmund Archer (artist) (1904–1986), American artist
