= George Denison (priest) =

English priest (1805–1896)

The Reverend George Denison
- Archdeacon of Taunton
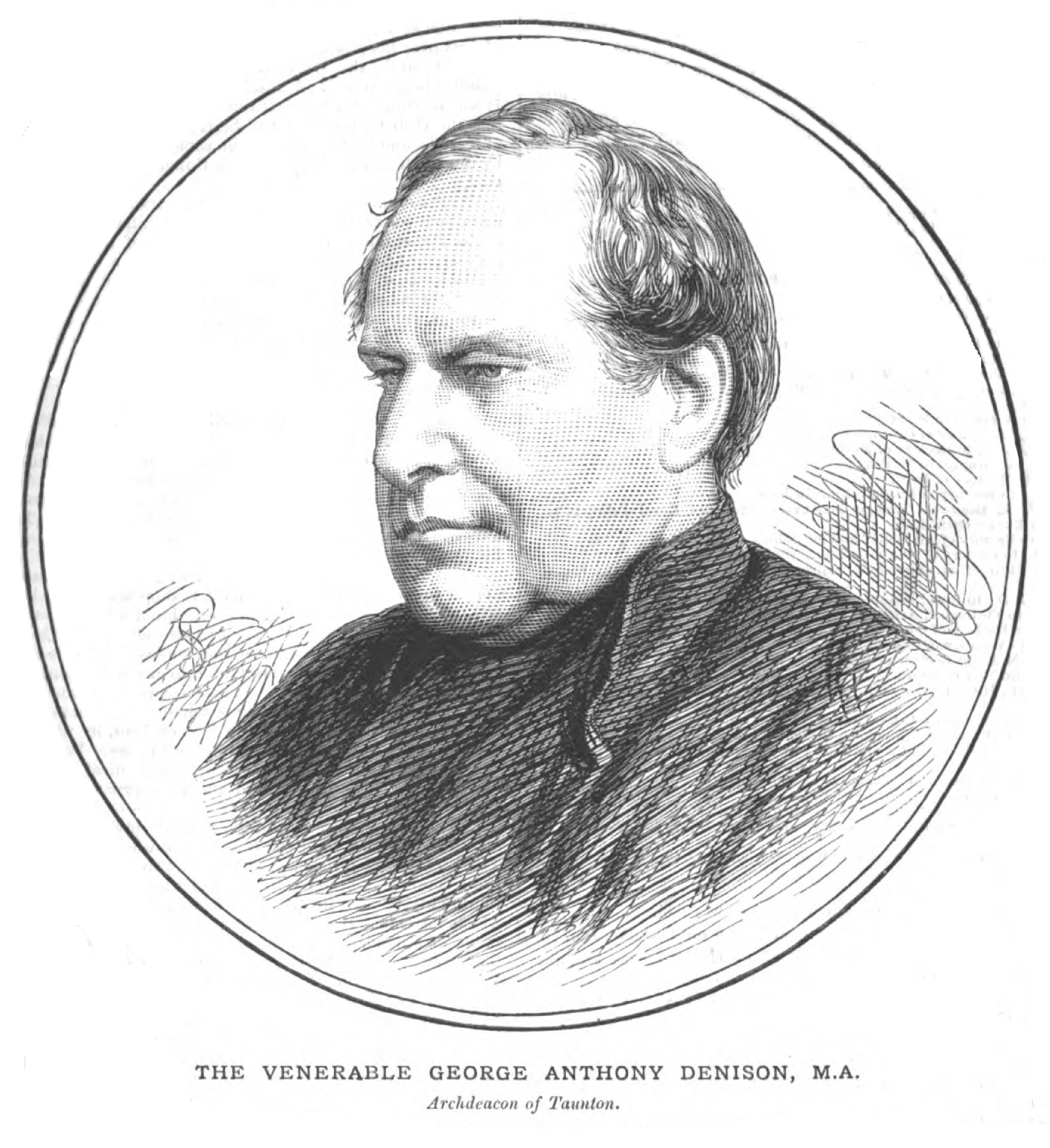
- Church: Church of England
- Province: Canterbury
- Diocese: Bath and Wells
- In office: 1851–1896
- Predecessor: Anthony Hamilton
- Successor: Alexander Ainslie

Orders
- Ordination: 1832

Personal details
- Born: George Anthony Denison; 11 December 1805 Ossington, England
- Died: 21 March 1896 (aged 90) East Brent, England
- Denomination: Anglican
- Parents: John Denison; Charlotte Estwick
- Spouse: Georgiana Henley (m. 1838)
- Education: Christ Church, Oxford

George Anthony Denison (1805–1896) was an English Anglican priest. He served as Archdeacon of Taunton from 1851.

== Life ==
Brother of politician Evelyn Denison, 1st Viscount Ossington, colonial administrator Sir William Denison and bishop Edward Denison, he was born on 11 December 1805 at Ossington, Nottinghamshire, and educated at Eton College and Christ Church, Oxford. In 1819 he was sent to Eton. In 1828 he was elected fellow of Oriel College; and after a few years there as a tutor, during which he was ordained and acted as curate at Cuddesdon, he became rector of Broadwindsor, Dorset (1838). He became a prebendary of Sarum in 1841 and of Wells in 1849. In 1851 he was preferred to the valuable living of East Brent, Somerset, and in the same year was made Archdeacon of Taunton.

For many years Denison represented the extreme High Tory party not only in politics but in the church, regarding all progressive movements in education or theology as abomination, and vehemently repudiating the higher criticism from the days of Essays and Reviews (1860) to those of Lux Mundi (1890).

He died on 21 March 1896 in East Brent.

== Ditcher v. Denison ==
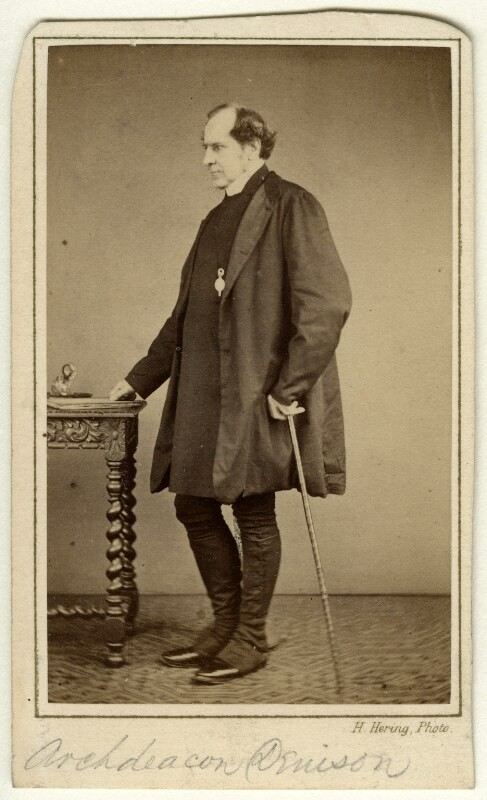
Denison, c. 1860

On 7 August and 6 November 1853, he preached two sermons in Wells Cathedral on the real presence of Christ in the Eucharist, taking a position similar to that for which Edward Bouverie Pusey had been suspended ten years before. He resigned his position as examining chaplain to the Bishop of Bath and Wells owing to his pronounced eucharistic views. A suit on the complaint of a neighbouring clergyman ensued and after various complications, Denison was condemned by the archbishop's court at Bath (1856). The judgment did not pass unchallenged, and that autumn a protest was issued arguing that Denison's teaching conformed with the best Anglican authorities. The protest was signed by fifteen of the most prominent Anglo-Catholics of the time, including Pusey, John Keble, and J. M. Neale.

On appeal the Court of Arches and the privy council quashed this judgment on a technical plea.

The case was significant for the various writings on the Eucharist that followed. In 1857, before the Court of Appeals had rendered its decision, John Keble wrote one of his more important works, his treatise on eucharistic adoration, in support of Denison. Pusey published his Doctrine of the Real Presence in the summer of 1857.

The result was to make Denison a keen champion of the ritualistic school, although he, himself, never wore vestments. He edited The Church and State Review (1862–1865). Secular state education and the conscience clause were anathema to him. Until the end of his life, he remained a protagonist in theological controversy and a keen fighter against latitudinarianism and liberalism; but the sharpest religious or political differences never broke his personal friendships and his Christian charity. Among other things for which he will be remembered was his origination of harvest festivals.

Church of England titles
Preceded by Anthony Hamilton	Archdeacon of Taunton; 1851–1896	Succeeded by Alexander Ainslie
