= Henry Ryder =

English evangelical Anglican bishop

The Right Reverend and Honourable Henry Ryder
- Bishop of Lichfield
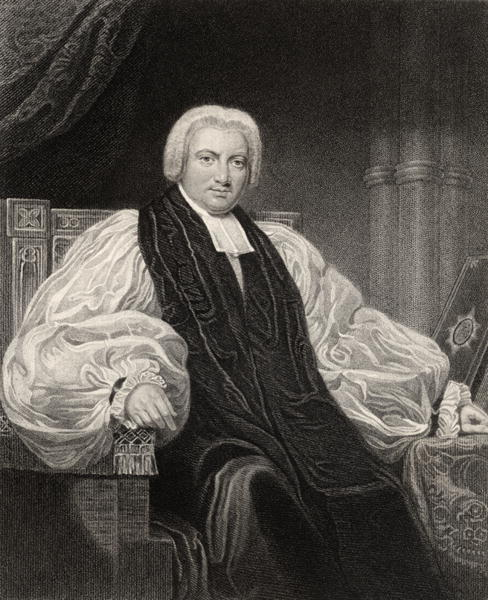
- Diocese: Lichfield
- In office: 1824–1836
- Predecessor: James Cornwallis
- Successor: Samuel Butler
- Other post: Bishop of Gloucester (1815–1824)

Personal details
- Born: 21 July 1777 Streatham, Surrey
- Died: 31 March 1836 (aged 58) Hastings, Sussex
- Denomination: Anglican
- Spouse: Sophia Phillips (m. 1802)
- Education: St John's College, Cambridge

Henry Dudley Ryder (21 July 1777 – 31 March 1836) was a prominent English evangelical Anglican bishop in the early years of the nineteenth century, most notably as Bishop of Lichfield. He was the first evangelical to be raised to the Anglican episcopate.

== Life ==
Ryder was the fifth son of Nathaniel Ryder, 1st Baron Harrowby, by his wife Elizabeth Terrick, daughter of Richard Terrick, Bishop of London. Dudley Ryder, 1st Earl of Harrowby and the Honourable Richard Ryder were his elder brothers. He was educated at Harrow School and St John's College, Cambridge,

Ryder was vicar of Lutterworth and of Claybrook. He was canon of Windsor from 1808, and was successively Bishop of Gloucester, from 1815, and Bishop of Lichfield and Coventry, from 1824. His kneeling statue by Francis Legatt Chantrey is in Lichfield Cathedral.

John Henry Newman, in his Apologia Pro Vita Sua, speaks of the veneration in which he held Ryder.

== Family ==
Ryder married Sophia, daughter of Thomas March Phillips, in 1802. Their second son George Dudley Ryder was the father of the Very Reverend Henry Ignatius Dudley Ryder. Their fifth son was Admiral of the Fleet Sir Alfred Phillips Ryder. Their sixth and youngest son Spencer Ryder was the ancestor of the sailor and politician Robert Ryder. Ryder died in March 1836, aged 58. His wife died in August 1862.

== Gallery ==
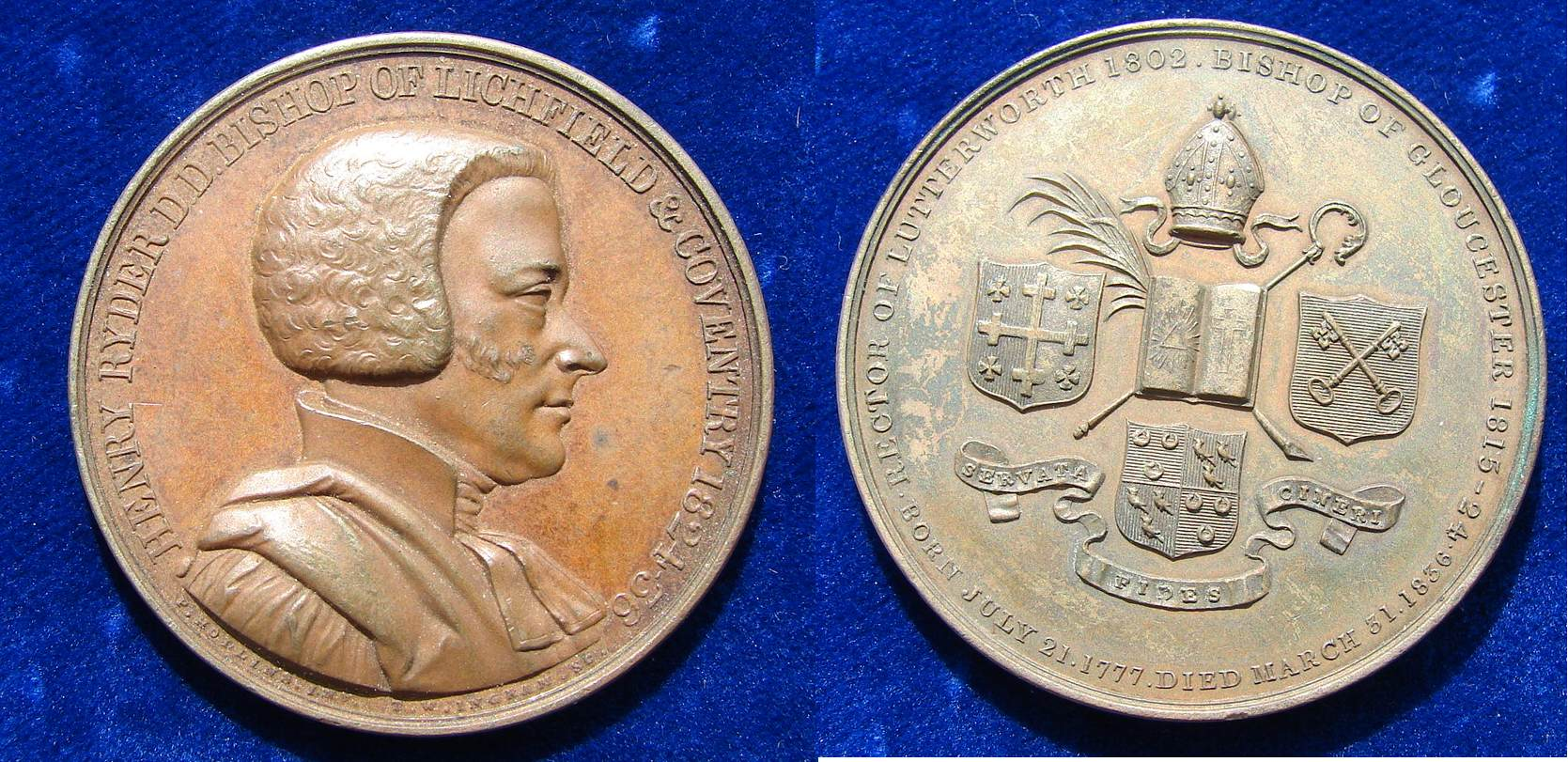
Bronze Medal 1836, issued in honour of Bishop Henry Dudley Ryder by Thomas Wells Ingram, Birmingham

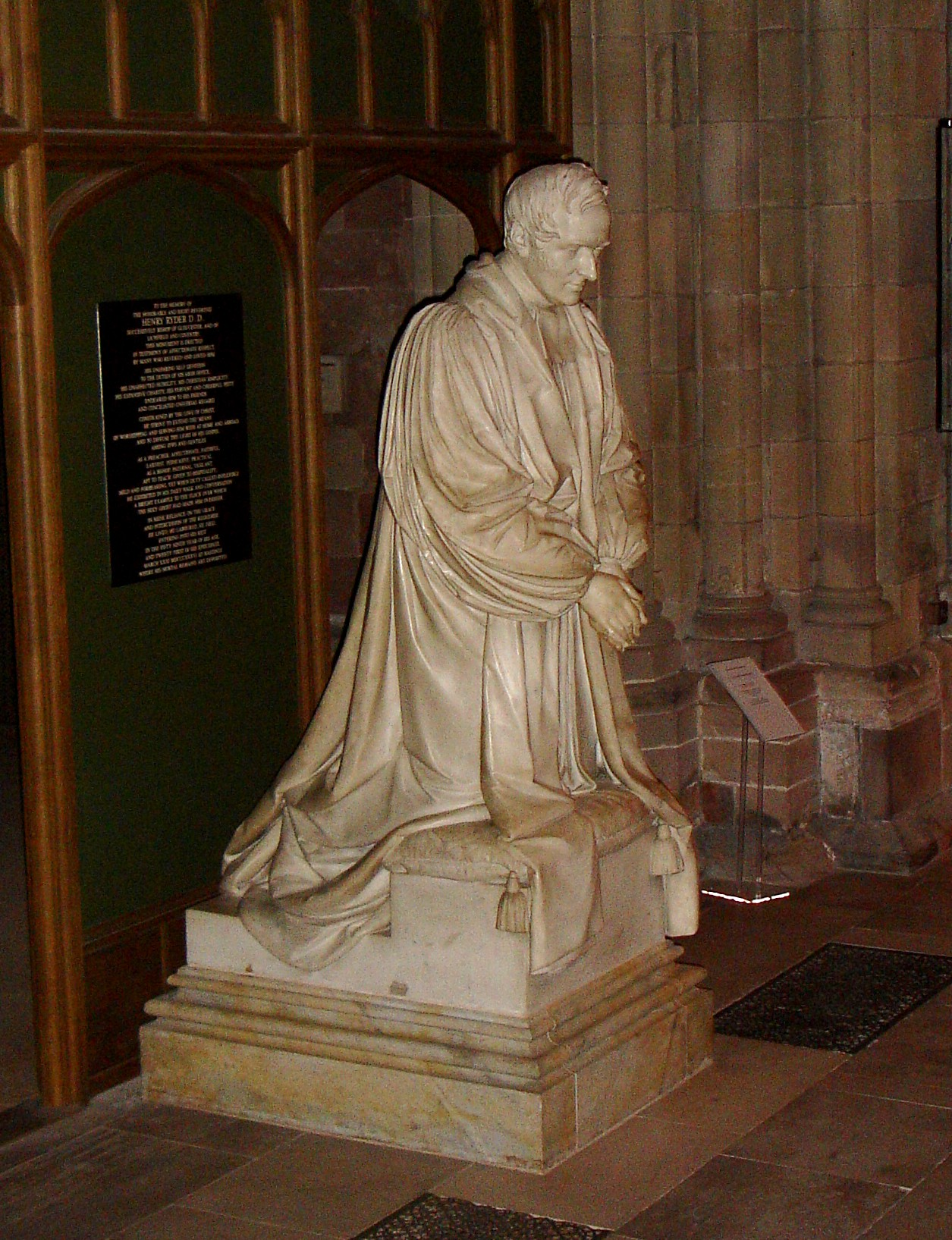
Monument to Bishop Ryder by Sir Francis Legatt Chantrey in Lichfield Cathedral

== Sources ==
=== Attribution ===
Church of England titles
Preceded by George Lukin	Dean of Wells; 1812–1831	Succeeded by Edmund Goodenough
Preceded by George Huntingford	Bishop of Gloucester; 1815–1824	Succeeded by Christopher Bethell
Preceded by James Cornwallis	Bishop of Lichfield; 1824–1836	Succeeded by Samuel Butler
