= Nicholas Slake =

14th-century Dean of Wells

Nicholas Slake was the Dean of Wells during 1398.

== Career ==
He was appointed:

- Prebendary of Erdington in Bridgnorth 1394
- Prebendary of Shirecote in Tamworth
- Prebendary of Wenlocksbarn in St Paul's Cathedral 1394 - 1395
- Prebendary of Brightling in Hastings 1394
- Prebendary of York 1396
- Dean of St Stephen's Chapel, Westminster 1396
- Dean of Wells 1396
- Rector of St Mary Abchurch 1398
- Archdeacon of Wells 1398

He was appointed to the fifth stall in St George's Chapel, Windsor Castle in 1382, a position he held until 1394.
