= William of Merton =

William of Merton was the Dean of Wells during 1237.
