= Nicholas Carent =

English church official

Nicholas Carent was the Dean of Wells from 1446 to 1467.
