= John Reed (priest) =

Former Archdeacon of Taunton

John Peter Cyril Reed (born 21 May 1951) was Archdeacon of Taunton from 1999 until his retirement in 2016.

Reed was educated at Monkton Combe School, King's College London and Ripon College Cuddesdon. He was ordained as a deacon in 1979, and a priest in 1980. After a curacy in Croydon he was precentor at St Albans Abbey from 1982 to 1986. He was rector of Timsbury with Priston from 1986 to 1993, and team rector of Ilminster from 1993 until his appointment as archdeacon.
