= Arnold Fitch =

English Archdeacon (1880–1965)

Edward Arnold Fitch, OBE (23 February 1880 – 23 April 1965) was Archdeacon of Taunton from 1938 to 1950.

The son of the Rev. Edward Fitch, sometime vicar of Burgh-by-Sands he was educated at Denstone College and Edinburgh Theological College. He was ordained deacon in 1905; and Priest in 1906. After a curacy at St James, Leith he became a Chaplain to the Forces in 1910. He served at Woolwich, Curragh, Pretoria, Harrismith, Bloemfontein, The Western Front, Bovington, Aldershot and Gibraltar. In 1936 he became an Honorary Chaplain to the King. He was rector of Angersleigh from 1946 to 1954. He was also a Prebendary of Compton Bishop in Wells Cathedral.

He died on 23 April 1965.
