= Thomas Thebaud =

Thomas Thebaud (of Sudbury) was the Dean of Wells between 1381 and 1389.
