= Justinian Lancaster =

English Anglican priest

Justinian Lancaster (born c. 1524) was an English Anglican priest in the 16th century.

Lancaster was educated at Corpus Christi College, Oxford, where he was admitted in 1541 and became a fellow in 1545. He held livings at Enmore, Huish Champflower, Chawton, Donyatt, Yatton and Churchstanton. Lancaster was Archdeacon of Taunton from 1560 until 1584, when he was appointed a prebendary of Wells Cathedral.
