= Walter Medeford =

Walter Medeford was the Dean of Wells during 1414.
