= Frederic Harton =

English Anglican priest

Frederic Percy Harton AKC (10 June 1889 – 3 November 1958) was an Anglican priest and author during the twentieth century. He was the husband of writer Sibyl Harton.

He trained for the priesthood at King's College, London (spending time at Bishop's College, Cheshunt); and ordained Deacon in 1913 and Priest in 1914. After curacies in Hornsey and Stroud Green he was Vicar of Ardeley from 1922 to 1926. He was at St Paul, Colombo from 1926 to 1927 then Warden of the Sisters of Charity, Knowle, Bristol. He was then Vicar of Baulking from 1936 to 1951.

Later he served as Dean of Wells (1951–1958). He is known essentially for a frequently republished guide to the spiritual life addressed to an Anglican readership but drawing significantly on seventeenth and eighteenth century French and Italian Catholic works of spiritual direction.
