= Thomas Smith (bishop of Carlisle) =

English clergyman (1615–1702)

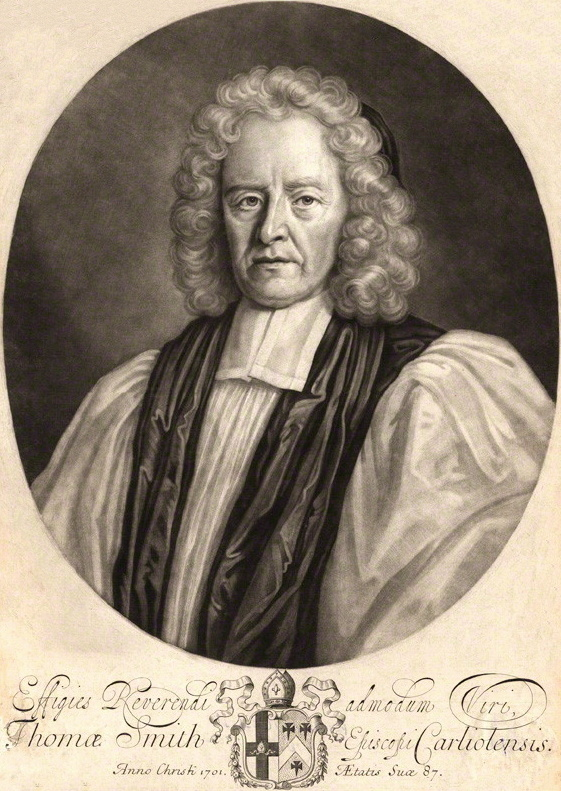
Thomas Smith, engraving by John Smith after Timothy Stephenson.

Thomas Smith (1615 – 12 April 1702) was an English clergyman, who served as Dean of Carlisle, 1672–1684, and Bishop of Carlisle, 1684–1702. He graduated MA from The Queen's College, Oxford in 1639 and served as chaplain to King Charles II.

== Life ==
The son of John Smith of Whitewell in the parish of Asby, Cumberland, after education at the free school at Appleby, he matriculated from Queen's College, Oxford, on 4 November 1631, aged 16. Having graduated B.A. in 1635 and M.A. in 1639, he became a fellow of his college and a tutor.

He was a select preacher before Charles I at Christ Church, Oxford, in 1645. When that city fell he retired to the north of England, where he married Catharine (née Dalston), widow of Sir Henry Fletcher of Hutton, in Cumberland, and only emerged on the Restoration, proceeding B.D. on 2 August 1660, and D.D. by diploma in the following November. He was appointed chaplain to Charles II, and was rewarded with the first prebendal stall in Carlisle Cathedral (November 1660). Within a few months of this he was collated to a prebend in the Durham Cathedral, the prebendal house attached to which he restored. On the promotion of Guy Carleton to the see of Bristol, Smith was instituted dean of Carlisle (4 March 1671–2). After the death of his wife Catherine on 16 April 1676 he married Anne Wrench, née Baddeley (sometime after 4 November 1676). He succeeded Edward Rainbowe as bishop in 1684 (consecrated 19 June), and died at Rose Castle on 12 April 1702. He was succeeded at Carlisle by another fellow of Queen's, William Nicolson.

== Legacy ==
A flat stone near the altar in the cathedral is inscribed to his memory. A number of his letters are calendared among the Rydal MSS.

As Dean, he rebuilt the deanery and presented the cathedral with an organ. With his first cousin, Thomas Barlow, bishop of Lincoln, and Randall Sanderson, he gave £600 for the improvement of Appleby Grammar School. He endowed Carlisle Grammar School, the chapter library, and the cathedral treasury, as well as donations to his old college at Oxford and to the poor.

== Notes ==
=== Attribution ===
This article incorporates text from a publication now in the public domain: "Smith, Thomas (1615-1702)". Dictionary of National Biography. London: Smith, Elder & Co. 1885–1900.

Church of England titles
| Preceded by Edward Rainbowe | Bishop of Carlisle; 1684–1703 | Succeeded by William Nicolson |
| Preceded by Guy Carleton | Dean of Carlisle; 1672–1684 | Succeeded by Thomas Musgrave |
