= Edward of Cnoll =

Dean of Wells in 1264

Edward of Cnoll was the Dean of Wells during 1264.
