= Ivo (Dean of Wells) =

Dean of wells

Ivo was the inaugural Dean of Wells between 1140 and 1164.
