= John Godelee =

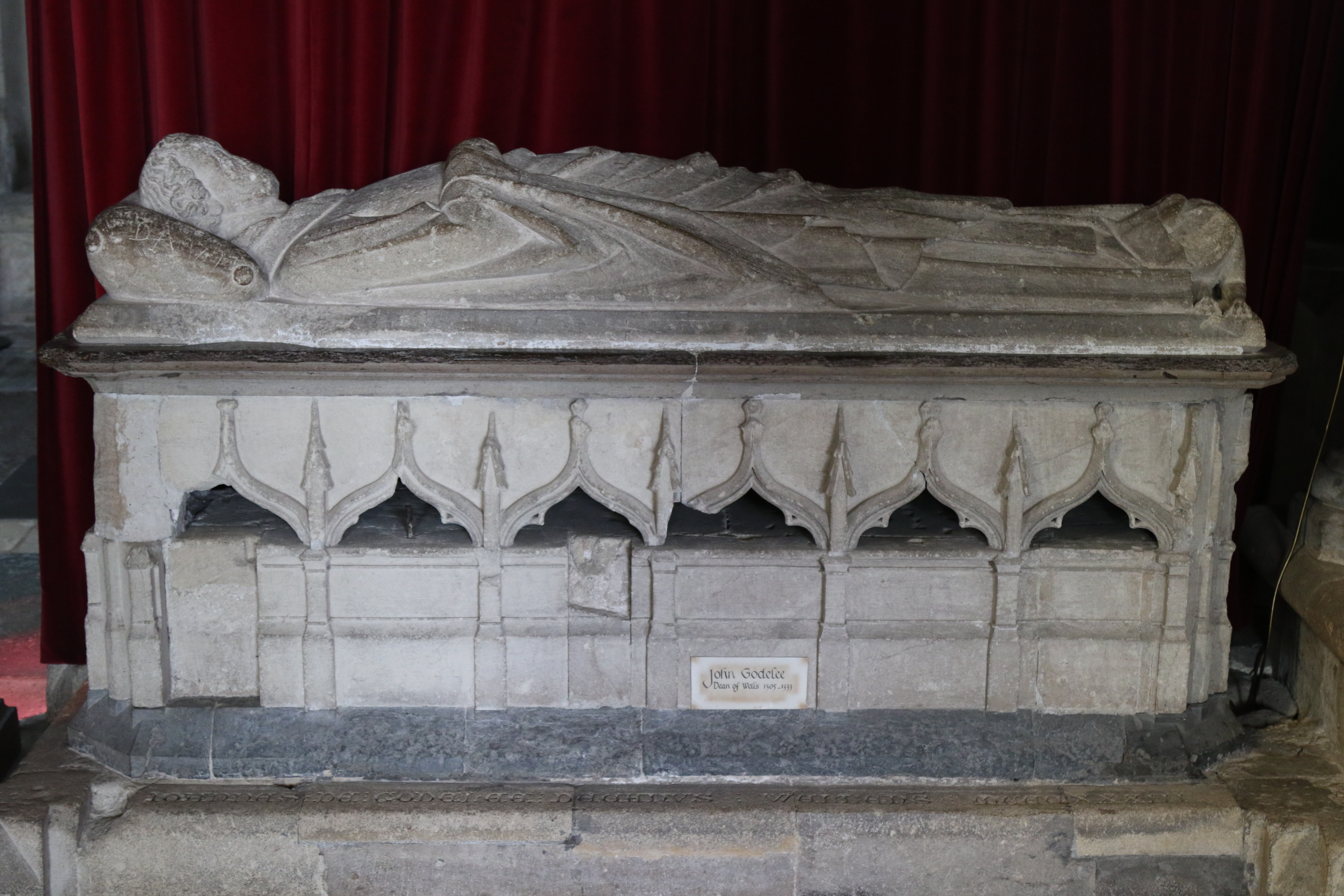
Tomb in Wells Cathedral

John Godelee was the Dean of Wells during 1305.
