= Leonard Olyott =

Leonard Eric Olyott (11 January 1926 – 6 April 2005) was Archdeacon of Taunton from 1977 to 1992.

== Education and career ==
Olyott was educated at Colchester Royal Grammar School, London University and Westcott House, Cambridge. He served in the RNVR from 1944 to 1947. He was Curate of St George, Camberwell from 1952 to 1955; Priest in charge of St Michael and All Angels, Birchwood from 1955 to 1960; Vicar of Chipperfield from 1960 to 1968; Vicar of Crewkerne from 1968 to 1971; Rector of Wayford from 1971 to 1977; and Rural Dean of Crewkerne from 1972 to 1977. He was also Prebendary of Milverton from 1977 to 1992; and Hospital Chaplains Adviser to successive Bishops of Bath and Wells from 1983 to 1992.
