= John of Carleton =

Dean of Wells

John of Carleton was the Dean of Wells between 1351 and 1360.
