= John Forest (priest) =

Dean of Wells (Somerset, England) from 1425 to 1446

John Forest was the Dean of Wells from 1425 to 1446.
