= John Turner (archdeacon of Taunton) =

English churchman

John Turner (c.1734–1817) was an English churchman, Archdeacon of Taunton from 19 September 1780 until his death on 28 March 1817. He matriculated at Hertford College, Oxford in 1751, aged 17, graduating B.A. in 1755.
