= Stephen Penpel =

Stephen Penpel was the Dean of Wells between 1361 and 1379.
