= Alexander (Dean of Wells) =

Dean of Wells from 1180 to 1204

Alexander was the Dean of Wells between 1180 and 1204.
