= William Askwith =

English church official (1843–1911)

William Henry Askwith (17 September 1843 - 9 April 1911) was Archdeacon of Taunton from 1903 until his death.

Askwith was educated at Cheltenham College and Trinity College, Cambridge. He was ordained in 1867 and began his career with curacies at Tidcombe then New Radford. He was Vicar of Christ Church, Derby from 1876 to 1887; then Vicar of St Mary Magdalene, Taunton, for the rest of his life.
