= Richard de Spakeston =

Richard de Spakeston was the Dean of Wells between 1160 and 1174.
