= Wibert of Littleton =

Wibert of Littleton was the Dean of Wells during 1334.
