= Edward Waple =

English Anglican priest (1647–1712)

Edward Waple (13 October 1647 – 8 June 1712) was an English Anglican priest.

Waple was born in the parish of Holy Trinity the Less in the City of London. He was educated at Merchant Taylor's and St John's College, Oxford. He was appointed Archdeacon of Taunton in 1682; Vicar of St Sepulchre-without-Newgate in 1683; and Canon of Winchester in 1690.

A collection of thirty of his sermons was published in 1714-15. Subsequent volumes were published in 1718 and 1720.
