= Thomas Musgrave (priest) =

Dean of Carlisle

Thomas Musgrave was Dean of Carlisle from 1684 until his death in 1686.

Musgrave was educated at The Queen's College, Oxford. He was presented by the king on 23 July 1684 and installed on 30 September that year. He had previously been Rector of Great Salkeld. He died on 28 March, 1686.

Church of England titles
Preceded by Thomas Smith	Dean of Carlisle; 1684 – 1686	Succeeded by William Grahme
