= John Goodman (dean of Wells) =

John Goodman (c. 1500 – 1561) was Dean of Wells Cathedral from 1548 to 1550, and again from 1554 to 1561.

== Early life and career ==
John Goodman was likely born in the County Somerset, England, around the year 1500. His exact birthdate is unknown, but he was listed as a chaplain in November 1518, and named as a priest when installed as vicar of West Harptree in April 1519. By canon law, chaplains had to be at least seventeenth years old, and priests could not be ordained without a papal dispensation until they were twenty-four years old. That would mean that Goodman was born sometime between 1495 and 1501. Nothing is known about Goodman's parents or siblings, except that the family likely had some wealth and that he had at least one brother. Goodman had modest connections within the church, as he served as a messenger for Cardinal Thomas Wolsey, and was present for the interrogation of Richard Wytcombe, a man suspected of sacramentarian heresy, in 1518.

Goodman used the income from his livings in North Curry and as a chaplain to attend the University of Cambridge, and he received a Bachelor's of Canon Law from the university in 1521. Goodman was often absent from his cures, as he remained at Cambridge through 1525, when he served as principal of St. Paul's Hostel in Cambridge. Cambridge's hostels were living quarters, and the principal was the hostel's representative who offered sureties to the landlord for each year's rent. Goodman did not receive any further degrees from Cambridge, but he would continue to add clerical livings and positions over the next decade. These included the rectory at Charleton, and the office of succentor or subchanter at Wells Cathedral. The succentorship came with a significant number of lands and rents around Somerset. In order to cement his holdings within his family, Goodman signed a lease for the lands with his kinsman, Thomas Fulwell, for a term of ninety years. By signing the lease with long terms to Fulwell, Goodman prevented future succentor from renting the land to someone outside his influence. Fulwell had served as Goodman's bailiff since at least 1534 and had been a loyal servant to Goodman during that time.

By 1532, Goodman was a client of Arthur Plantagenet and his wife Honor Genville, Lord and Lady Lisle. Lord Lisle had helped Goodman obtain the rectory of Charleton, and had assisted Goodman in speculating on a statute (a financial bond where land was offered as security for the debt). Unfortunately for Goodman, Lord Lisle fell out of favor with the King by 1540, resulting in Lisle's arrest and imprisonment in the Tower of London. Goodman worked to find a new patron during his frequent trips to London on the chapter at Wells’ behalf. Goodman became acquainted with Edward Seymour, then Earl of Hertford, and his wife, Anne Seymour sometime after the arrest of Lord Lisle. Goodman was admitted to the Earl's household by 1543, where he served as the Earl's chaplain, and waited on the Lady Hertford, likely as a confessor.

Goodman's career stalled in the mid-1540s until the death of Henry VIII and the Bishop of Bath and Wells, William Knight, both in 1547. After Henry died in January, Seymour, Hugh Paget, and other evangelicals (i.e. more reformed) moved to take control over the new king, Edward VI and his council. Through their machinations, Seymour was made Earl of Somerset, and appointed as the king's Lord Protector, with near kingly powers. Somerset used his new powers to appoint well-known evangelical preacher William Barlow to the bishopric. Through a mixture of coercion and persuasion, Somerset managed to get the current Dean of Wells to resign, dissolve the chapter, re-found it as a royal donative, and seize much of the land holdings of the new Bishop and the Cathedral. Somerset used his influence over the boy king to issue a letter patent ordering the newly re-founded chapter of Wells to install John Goodman as their new dean on 8 January 1548.

== Conflicts with the Bishop and Church ==
Less than two years after his appointment as dean, Goodman came into conflict with his new Bishop, William Barlow. The years were a period of rapid religious change, such as introducing a new Prayer Book, and removing restrictions on clerical marriage. Protector Somerset and the council he appointed worked to implement a more evangelical religious settlement on England than that envisioned by Henry VIII at his death. Barlow was a major promoter of the new more evangelical position, and had implemented similar reforms during his time as Bishop of St Davids in Wales, especially against the presence of images in churches. Goodman dispensed with some of the traditional religious objects, such as candlesticks and images of bishops, but overall made few changes to the cathedral or religious practices of the chapter. Barlow's zeal for the new religion found this pace intolerable, and worked to supplant Goodman with a new, more radical dean, in the person of William Turner.

Barlow found a way to remove Goodman in 1550, through a technicality in ecclesiastical law. When the cathedral Chapter had been dissolved, much of the lands and rents had been regranted to Protector Somerset, cutting the income of both the bishop and dean. In order to augment his existing income, Goodman annexed the prebend of Wiveliscombe to himself. According to Barlow, Goodman had voided his claim to the deanship because he now held two prebends within the Cathedral simultaneously; that of North Currey, annexed to the deanship by law in the re-founding of the chapter, and Wiveliscombe. Barlow summarily deprived Goodman of his office in spring of 1550. Goodman responded by filing a writ of praemunire in June against his Bishop. Goodman claimed that because the deanery was re-founded by royal grant, that the bishop usurped the King's authority by depriving him of the king's donation. Goodman and Barlow both appealed to friends for assistance as the Court of King's Bench took up the case. Goodman wrote to John Berwick, the receiver general for the Duke of Somerset (formerly Protector), to try and drive a wedge between Barlow and the Duke.

The case between Barlow and Goodman was initially heard before the justices in October 1550. Barlow solicited the help of the Privy Council, asking them to delay the hearing, and eventually for a pardon for contempt when he did not come in person. Turner had also been in contact with Archbishop Thomas Cranmer on the case. Cranmer stated that, though he agreed that Goodman should be deprived, Barlow had no authority to do it, and petitioned lawyers at the Court of Arches for their comments. The Privy Council was sympathetic to Barlow's request and position and sought to streamline the court process. The Privy Council summoned the justices hearing the case before them in November 1550, and brow-beat them for continuing to hear litigation on the case. Despite the Privy Council's instructions that Goodman vacate the deanery, he remained obstinate into February 1551. In response, the Privy council ordered his imprisonment in the Fleet Prison due to his “his disobedience and ill handling of the Bishop.” The Council did not release Goodman until 25 May 1551, two months after the chapter had confirmed William Turner as their new Dean.

Turner's deanship was short lived and difficult. Goodman refused to vacate the house granted to him when he became Dean because Turner's grant did not specifically include the house in his appointment by the king. Goodman was allowed to remain at the Cathedral because he still held the prebend of Wiveliscombe. Turner wrote to William Cecil, then Secretary of State that Goodman keeps the Dean's house “with all kinds of weapons and violence so that I cannot enter into it,” and further that Goodman prevented Turner from collecting hay to feed his horses because Goodman had rented all the lands to his kinsmen. Turner exclaimed that Goodman “is the craftiest fox that ever went upon two feet,” in his frustration. As a partial solution, Turner was given dispensation from residency, so long as he traveled around the country to preach a more evangelical message to the populace. The conflict between Goodman and Turner came to a pause with the death of King Edward VI and Mary's assumption of the throne. Bishop Barlow tried to flee to the continent, but was captured and imprisoned in the Tower in September 1553, and was eventually deprived of his office. Turner managed to escape to the continent a few days after Barlow's imprisonment, and Goodman used his flight to regain his position as dean under Mary.

Goodman's second tenure as Dean was less eventful than his first. All but one of the current members of the Cathedral chapter had been in place since the reign of Henry VIII. The lone exception was John Cardmaker, who was deprived of his livings on 18 April 1554. The crown government and Bishop Edmund Bonner later burned Cardmaker as a relapsed heretic. The chapter returned to practicing their religion as they had before the reign of Edward VI, purchasing grain for Maundy Thursday, new cloths for the main altars, and replacing candles at side altars for various saints. Goodman has been traditionally described by historians like Jasper Ridley as a religious conservative, or “an opponent of the Reformation”. Thomas Mayer and Courtney Walters have more recently indicated that Goodman was more of a conformist, and opportunist. They point out that Goodman was not immediately deprived when Elizabeth became queen, and she even re-granted him lands that the deanery had surrendered when they dissolved in 1547. Further, in the few surviving letters from Goodman, his criticisms of Bishop Barlow are rarely about reformed religion. Instead they refer to personal and economic slights, such as Barlow “running flocks of sheep on the Mendips and for evicting poor tenants from their copies.”

When Turner returned from exile on the continent, the Queen and Archbishop Matthew Parker re-opened the legal case of his praemunire and deprivation. Parker used those proceedings to remove Goodman from his position as dean instead of claiming he was a papist. Elizabeth summoned a commission that included the Archbishop and several doctors of law, to decide the case. Goodman was found to have been legally deprived, and when he resisted, the crown threatened him to vacate or be fined £1000. Goodman finally stopped resisting, and he was allowed a position in the cathedral as a canon. His continued presence in the Cathedral indicates he conformed well enough to the new requirements and that he was no longer a danger. Goodman died near the end of 1561, likely from a sudden illness as he was unable to make a will before dying. His estate was still the subject of litigation through 1578 when a Thomas Goodman, likely his nephew, was granted a letter of administration to manage the distribution of his estate.

== Lawsuits and violence with tenants and Thomas Fulwell ==
Goodman's legal battles were not limited to his Bishop or the church. After he received his largest set of landholdings as succentor of Wells in c. 1534, he was in near constant lawsuits over his lands and his attempts to keep them. In 1533, he was involved in two lawsuits that lasted five years; one over a debt that he claimed was unsatisfied, and the other regarding a tenant's inheritance of land. As Goodman's wealth increased, so did the number of lawsuits, many over debts owed that Goodman sought to take through the courts. One example was a suit over the cost of furniture owed to Goodman as an executor of the estate of Bishop William Knight. The longest lasting, and most significant set of cases were exercised between two main English law courts, that of Chancery and Star Chamber between Goodman and his former bailiff, Thomas Fulwell.

In 1539, Goodman leased around 400 acres of land to his kinsman, Thomas Fulwell for a term of ninety years. Goodman intended to use his kinsman to control the rents and lands if or after he lost his rights to them. Fulwell and Goodman's relationship soured when Fulwell married his wife Christabel James, without permission from Goodman. Goodman considered Christabel to be unsuitable, or too low born for Fulwell, and had intended to find him a different bride. Goodman initially tried to buy back the lease from Fulwell, and when he was refused, threatened to take Fulwell to court which could cost him more than £100. Fulwell was able to get an injunction from the Crown preventing Goodman from seizing his lands, and the writ itself stated boldly that Goodman showed contempt for the king's laws. Goodman was imprisoned in Fleet Prison as a means of coercing him to leave Fulwell unmolested.

Less than two years after Fulwell received the injunction that stated he would be able to reside on the land without harassment, Goodman escalated the issue. On 12 July 1547, several men approached Fulwell while he was working in the field. The men seized ten cartloads of hay, and delivered it to Goodman's house at the cathedral. Before carting off the hay, the men savagely beat Fulwell, so that he had to spend two weeks recovering in bed. The surgeons who visited Fulwell warned him and his family that he was likely to die. Fulwell was able to recover, and later brought suit against Goodman in the court of Star Chamber, instead of Chancery like the previous cases. Fulwell chose Star Chamber because it was a cheaper court that was popular among people alleging riot against the defendant, and offered “some people relatively fast, flexible solutions to problems that other courts could not address.” Goodman claimed ignorance of the violence against Fulwell, but the records make this claim disingenuous. A similar incident occurred in October 1550, when eight men arrived at the house of John Bucher, a sub-tenant of Fulwell. The men arrived “armed with swords, bucklers, daggers, staves,” and other weapons, forced Bucher and his wife out of the house and occupied the land for five months. Another posse arrived again in October 1551, breaking down his door and chasing off Bucher and his children. While these two incidents are not conclusively directed by Goodman, they bear similarity to the treatment of Fulwell, and fit with a man who in his disagreements with William Turner, held his house “like a fortress.” The conclusion of these two cases is unknown, but Goodman was not done.

Fulwell brought suit against Goodman again in 1558, after being harassed for the previous three years. Goodman had chased Fulwell off four acres of meadow in 1555, and Fulwell responded by getting another injunction against Goodman. In June 1557, several men, including Goodman's nephew William Goodman, came to the acres “armed with swords, daggers, and pike,” and stole the hay that Fulwell had been cutting. Fulwell fled fearing he would be killed, but his wife remained behind. As she scolded the men for stealing their hay, William Goodman struck her on the chest, nearly killing her. The men then carted the hay to John Goodman's house, and mixed it in with the existing hay, making separation at a later date impossible. The run of suits and counter-suits between Fulwell and Goodman extended beyond their deaths. As late as 1598, Fulwell's descendants were still petitioning in court for restoration of inheritance, goods, or cash.

Thomas Fulwell's son, Ulpian Fulwell was a playwright and satirist, writing in the 1560s and 1570s. One of his satires, Ars Adulandi, or the Art of Flattery, was published in 1576, and contained a scathing critique of the church. The modern editor of Ars Adulandi, Roberta Buchanan, argues that of the characters, Sir Simon, a parson, may have been inspired by Goodman's treatment of his father. Ulpian Fulwell has Sir Simon claim he is not done acquiring his plurality, and that friendship and hospitality are repaid by treachery, the Judas kiss, and the confiscation of his friend's home. Although these could apply to multiple clergymen in Elizabeth's reign and prior, nevertheless they ring true for John Goodman.
