= William Burnell =

William Burnell was the Dean of Wells Cathedral from 1292 to 1295 and also served as Bishop Robert Burnell's executor.

William Burnell previously held the manor and church of Winscombe as provost of Wells Cathedral. A 1306 agreement between the dean and chapter of Wells and the executors of Henry Huse referred to Burnell as the former Farmer and administrator of the Property before it was Leased to new Tenants for a three-year-term.

A marginal note in a 1295 letter of William of March identifies William Burnell in connection with the vacancy of the Deanery of Wells Cathedral following the death of Henry Huse. The letter revoked the appointment of Sir Andrew de Grymstede as custodian of the Deanery after the chapter demonstrated through ancient records that custody rights belonged to them by grant of earlier Bishops.
