= Lydford Castle =

Medieval castle in Devon, England

- Lydford, Devon
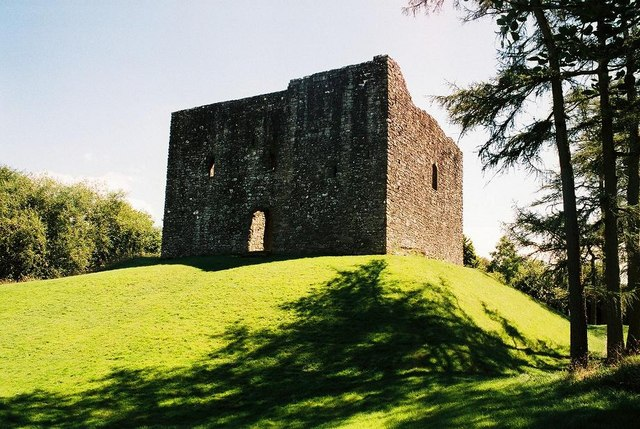
- Lydford Castle's tower, seen from the north-west

Site information
- Controlled by: English Heritage

Location
- Shown within Devon
- Coordinates: 50.6428°N 4.1115°W
- Grid reference: grid reference SX508847

Lydford Castle is a medieval castle in the town of Lydford, Devon, England. The first castle in Lydford, sometimes termed the Norman fort, was a small ringwork built in a corner of the Anglo-Saxon fortified burh in the years after the Norman conquest of England. It was intended to help control Devon following the widespread revolt against Norman rule in 1068. The Norman fort had been abandoned by the middle of the 12th century.

The second castle in Lydford was constructed in 1195 following a wave of law and order problems across England. It included a stone tower with a surrounding bailey, and rapidly became used as a prison and court to administer the laws in the Forest of Dartmoor and the Devon stannaries. The tower was rebuilt in the middle of the 13th century, probably in the 1260s by Richard, the Earl of Cornwall. It was redesigned to resemble a motte and bailey castle, an antiquated design for the period but one that was heavily symbolic of authority and power. In 1342 the castle, still being used as a prison and courtroom, passed to the Duchy of Cornwall, who owned it until the 20th century.

The castle was repeatedly renovated and then left to deteriorate, so its condition varied considerably over time. Nonetheless, other than a period during the English Civil War and the Restoration in the 17th century, Lydford Castle played an important part in stannary and forest administration until the 19th century. The castle acquired a bad reputation for injustice in the 14th century, and complaints about "Lydford Law" persisted for centuries. In the early 19th century, however, Dartmoor Prison was constructed, and Lydford ceased to be the centre for legal administration. The castle had fallen into ruin by the middle of the century.

In 1932, Lydford Castle passed into the hands of the state, and in the 21st century is run by English Heritage as a tourist attraction. Historian Andrew Saunders has described the castle as architecturally significant, being "the earliest example of a purpose-built gaol" in England. The earthworks of the Norman fort are owned by the National Trust and are open to the public.

== History ==
=== 1066–1150 ===
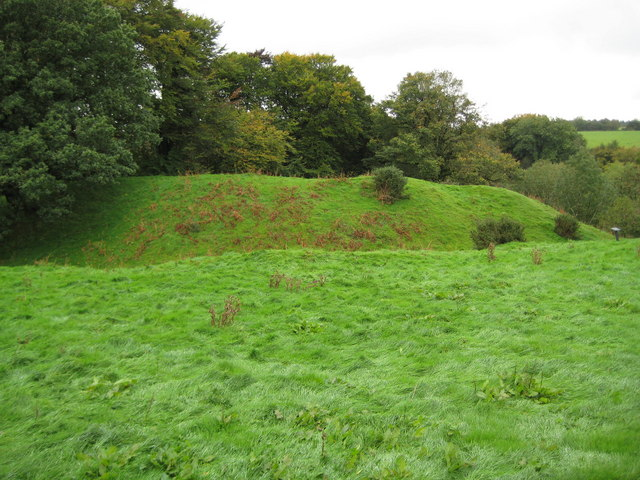
Earthwork remains of the 11th-century castle

The first castle at Lydford was built in the aftermath of the Norman conquest of England in 1066. In 1068 William the Conqueror intervened in South-West England to put down widespread Anglo-Saxon revolts against Norman rule and set about pacifying the region. William had been responsible for building urban castles across England in the former centres of Anglo-Saxon power and in Devon he constructed new urban castles at Exeter, Totnes, possibly Barnstaple and in the town of Lydford.

Lydford, then called Hlidan, was a type of fortified Anglo-Saxon town called a burh. The castle, in the 21st century called the "Norman fort", was built on the isolated south-west corner of the burh, soon after 1068. It had a ringwork design and was only 55 metres (180 ft) by 60 metres (200 ft) in size, protected in part by the existing defences of the burh. A similar pattern of castle building within existing Anglo-Saxon burhs can be seen at Wallingford and Bedford castles. Most of the interior of the castle was used to store grain in large timber and earth buildings. It is uncertain whether these storage facilities were intended for supplying Norman troops or storing grain for wider economic purposes.

This first castle was used only briefly and seems to have been abandoned by the middle of the 12th century. The grain stores were destroyed by fire, but the reason for this is uncertain. By this period, the town of Lydford as a whole was also in serious economic decline.

=== 1150–1239 ===
==== Construction ====
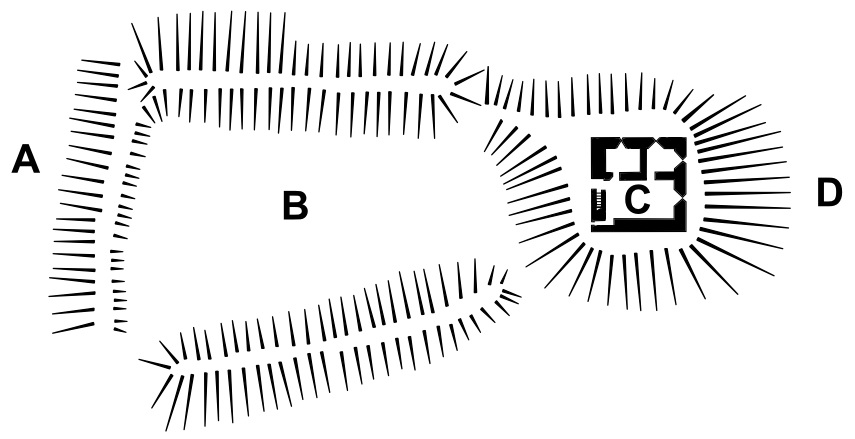
Plan of the castle in the 21st century; A - outer edge of the burh wall and valley; B - bailey; C - tower; D - Lydford's main street

In the late 12th century Richard I's government attempted to promote the growth of Lydford, including revitalising trade in the town. Then, in 1195, there were widespread problems with law and order across England, including the South-West, and on the basis of this Richard's government decided to build a fortification for holding royal prisoners in Lydford, further along the west side of the town from the old castle, in a prestigious location next to the town's church. This fortification is referred to in contemporary documents variously as a firme domus and castelli de Lideford, a "strong house" and "Lydford Castle" respectively.

It is unclear why the decision was taken to build the new castle in a different location within the town. Lydford's case is not unique, as a similar shift occurred at Canterbury and Gloucester; generally, such changes in castle location are associated with the destruction of the older defence or changes in political leadership. Archaeologist Andrew Saunders suggests that the new site was chosen because the earlier castle at Lydford was not owned by the Crown in 1195 and was, in any case, in disrepair. £74 was spent on the construction of the castle, paid for by Crown revenues from both Devon and Cornwall. (Note: It is impossible to accurately compare medieval and modern prices or incomes. For comparison, a typical baron of the period enjoyed an average annual income of around £100.)

The castle took the form of a stone tower with a surrounding bailey. The bailey was rectangular and in the 21st century measures 180 feet (55 m) by 130 feet (40 m). The bailey was protected by ramparts and deep ditches on the south-west and north-east sides, with the north-west side protected by the ramparts and valley of the original burh fortifications. The south-east side of the bailey probably formed a small courtyard in front of the tower, in a space now occupied by part of the 13th century earthworks, and was probably the entrance to the original castle.

The tower was a square, free-standing building, 52 feet (16 m) by 52 feet (16 m) and at least two storeys tall; in the 12th century the tower sat on flat ground with no mound around it. The walls were roughly built from slate and granite, up to 11-foot (3.4 m) thick, and pierced by arrow slits. The tower had a spine wall along the middle of the building, dividing each floor into two rooms. The entrance was probably on the first floor of the building. An internal water supply was installed, of which a decorated spout still survives.

==== Role in stannary and forest law ====
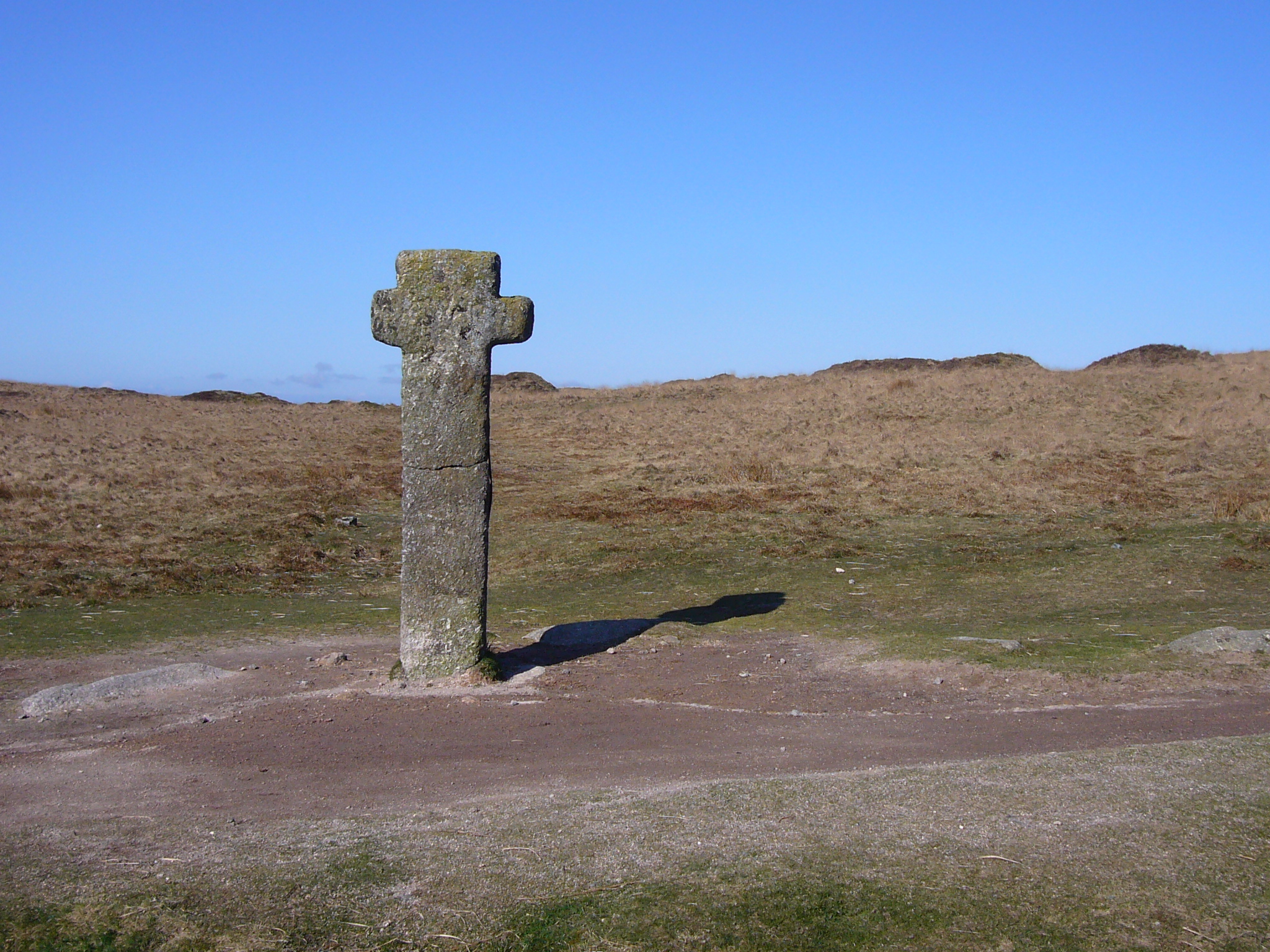
Boundary marker on the Forest of Dartmoor

Lydford Castle does not seem to be primarily designed to have a military function, although in 1199 when King John succeeded to the throne he had the castle garrisoned and expensively equipped to prevent any potential unrest breaking out in the region. The castle lacked the usual military features of the time, such as external gatehouses, and its design seems to have been intended to evoke the authority of a traditional defensive fortification rather than to resist an actual attack. Instead, as well as helping to deal with the wider problems in 1195, the castle appears to have been built with the intention of enforcing the stannary and forest law in Devon. It is possible that the Crown originally intended that the castle took over the stannary law across the whole of Cornwall and Devon, although in practice its role extended only to governing the Devon stannaries.

Stannary law was a medieval English legal system for governing the tin industry. South-West England, and in particular Devon, was a major producer of tin in the 12th century, produced by independent miners who worked the alluvial deposits across the region. The industry was regulated by the Crown, who taxed mining output and raised revenue from any fines imposed on those who broke the stannary laws. The laws also helped to manage the relationship between the miners and other local people, whose economic interests were often at odds. The output of tin increased from the end of the 12th century onwards, encouraging the Crown to extend its regulation and generate more revenue. In 1198, William of Wrotham, who controlled Lydford Castle at the start of John's reign, was appointed as the Warden of the Stannaries, a new office intended to provide additional rigour to the administration of the mining industry. Stannary courts were established in Devon, backed by a team of officials, and, with the creation of the Duchy of Cornwall in the 14th century, the administration of stannary law was delegated to the duchy. From 1198 onwards, Lydford Castle was designated as the prison for supporting the court and its processes.

Forests were special areas of land in medieval England, owned by the Crown and subject to forest law. They were often selected because of their natural resources, and were expected to provide the Crown with a flow of money or raw materials. In 1195, the Forest of Dartmoor extended across all of Devon, but in 1204 John curtailed the extent of the royal forest, removing much of Devon from Forest Law and leaving the area known in the modern period as Dartmoor. This reduced forest was still subject to the Forest Laws, involving a specialised group of legal officials who met at Lydford Castle to impose fines and other punishments. Probably both Lydford Castle and the forest was given to the Sheriff of Devon, William Brewer, in 1216. The arrangement changed under Henry III, when the estates were given to Richard, the Earl of Cornwall in 1239. Legally, this meant that the Forest of Dartmoor was converted to a chase, although the Earls of Cornwall continued to hold law courts at Lydford Castle, enforcing chase laws that closely resembled the former Forest Laws.

=== 1239–1278 ===
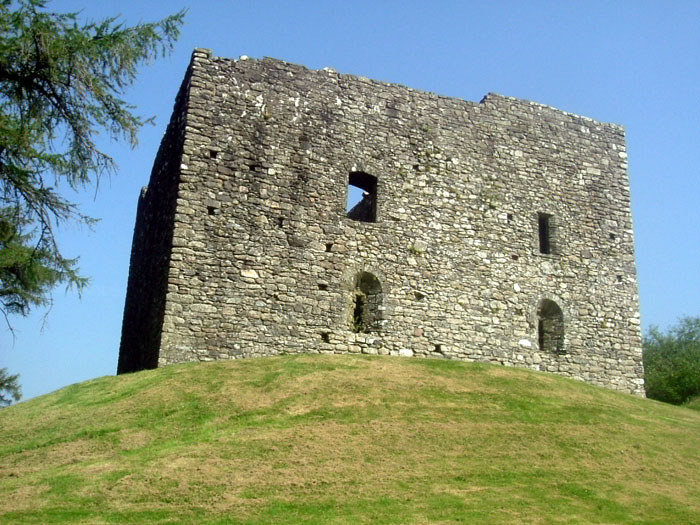
Tower seen from the south-east

Richard, Edward II's second son, took possession of Lydford Castle in 1239 as the Earl of Cornwall. Richard took a close interest in developing the town of Lydford, creating an additional market and introducing a new fair in the 1260s. Around this time, the main tower at Lydford Castle was demolished and rebuilt, probably by Richard, possibly following a serious fire in the building. Richard was a wealthy politician and rebuilding the castle in this way would have provided him with an important status symbol in the region. (Note: Historian Robert Higham has put forward a potential alternative dating for the reconstruction of Lydford Castle, suggesting that both it and nearby Launceston Castle might have been rebuilt not by Richard, but by his son, Edmund.)

The previous tower was stripped back, the existing walls levelled off around 14 feet (4.3 m) from the ground and the ground floor arrow slits filled in. Two more storeys were then built on top of the older walls, better executed with a higher proportion of granite stone and thinner, typically around 6-foot (1.8 m) thick. Although the structure remained essentially the same, the new tower was slightly smaller, measuring around 48 feet (15 m) by 47 feet (14 m). The first floor was only basically designed, with a sequence of rooms of different levels of comfort, and intended to function as the prison, and the second floor was better finished, with a hall and a chamber, and probably operated as the courtroom and provided accommodation for the keeper of the castle.

As part of the work, an earth mound, or motte, 17-foot (5.2 m) high, was piled up around the base of the tower. The original ground floor of the castle was now an underground cellar, probably used as a puteus, or pit, for detaining low status prisoners and reached by ladder from the first floor. Some infilling of the ground floor occurred in order to equalise the pressure on the walls from the mound. It is uncertain how many other towers or keeps have similar mounds, as excavation is usually required before the foundations can be examined, but Totnes and Farnham castles are known to have mottes build against the walls of the keep. The reason for building the mound is uncertain, but it was almost certainly not designed as a serious defensive feature. It was instead probably intended as to superficially imitate older motte and bailey designs, with the completed castle echoing these former symbols of power and reinforcing the current political status of its owner.

=== 1278–1642 ===
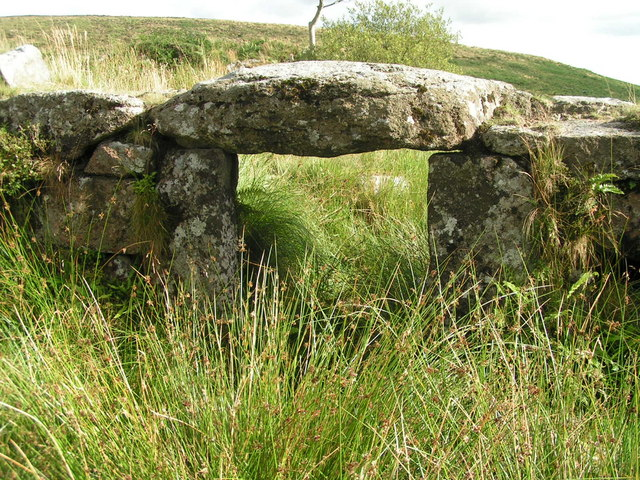
A blowing house, part of the remains of the medieval tin industry in Devon governed by the Stannaries

Richard's son, Edmund took over the earldom in 1278 but had little interest in Lydford, preferring Restormel and Lostwithiel; by his death in 1299 the castle had been left to decay and was in ruins. It reverted to the Crown, and when Edward II made his royal favourite, Piers Gaveston, the Earl of Cornwall in 1307, Lydford Castle was passed to him. The castle was repaired at the start of the century and was in use once again as a prison. Edward II and Gaveston fell from power in 1327 and Thomas le Ercedekne was temporarily entrusted with the castle and Dartmoor by the new regime. In 1329 the castle was valued at a little over £11. (Note: It is impossible to accurately compare medieval and modern prices or incomes. For comparison, the honour of Okehampton, a major landholding in Devon, produced £489 a year in income during this period.) Piers Gaveston's widow, Margaret de Clare, leased the property to Tavistock Abbey, and it continued to operate as a prison.

Edward, the Black Prince became Duke of Cornwall in 1337 and he acquired Lydford Castle on Margaret's death in 1342. Extensive repairs took place over the next three years, and the castle was considered to be well roofed and decorated inside. Over the next two centuries the condition of the castle fluctuated. Around 1390 the castle roof was stripped for its lead, to be used on castles in Cornwall. The castle well was possibly dug during the 15th century. After 1425, the Crown let it to a range of individuals, including Sir Walter Hungerford and Sir Philip Courteney.

Lydford remained the centre of the forest administration through the 14th and 15th centuries. Despite complaints from non-miners at the start of the 14th century that the prison regime at Lydford Castle was overly lax, by the end of the century the prison had a reputation for poor, grim conditions. The first known rhymes complaining about "Lydford Law" date from 1399, and continued to be popular for several centuries. In 1510, Richard Strode, a Member of Parliament campaigning for reform of the Stannary laws, was infamously arrested by Stannary officials and imprisoned in Lydford Castle. He later described how he was kept in an underground room in the keep, fed only bread and water, and encumbered with legcuffs until he paid the keeper to release him from the irons.

After 1485, the Duchy took the castle back into direct control, and by 1546 it was in poor repair. Renovation work was carried out under Elizabeth I, but a report of 1618 suggested that the castle was unable to function as a prison because of its poor condition, and fresh repair work was carried out in the 1620s and 1630s under Charles I.

=== 1642–1900 ===
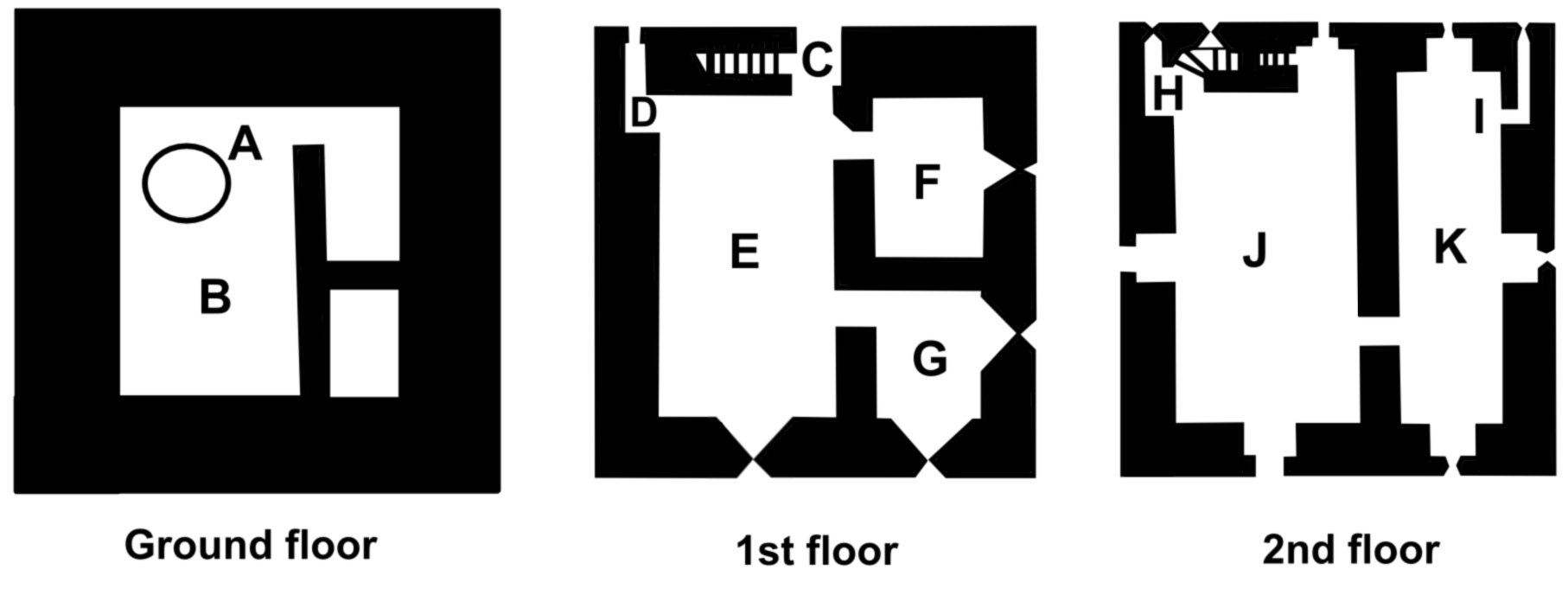
Plan of Lydford Castle's tower, following 18th-century renovations: A - well; B - puteus; C - entrance; D - garderobe; E - probable common room; F, G - prisoner accommodation; H, I - garderobe; J - probable courtroom; K - chambers

Lydford Castle was involved in the English Civil War that broke out in 1642 between the Royalist supporters of Charles I and Parliament. The castle was used by the Royalist commander Sir Richard Grenville as his main military prison in the region. It had a terrible reputation amongst Parliamentarians, who complained that it was used to summarily execute military prisoners and to extort money from innocent civilians, on fear of imprisonment. At the end of the civil war, the Lydford estate appears to have been sold off by Parliament The castle was assessed by their surveyors to be "almost totally ruined" in 1650: the roof of the tower was still mostly intact, but the floors and their beams were collapsing, and the whole site, including the bailey, was only worth around £80. (Note: It is difficult to accurately compare early modern and modern prices or incomes. £80 in 1650 could be worth between £9,000 and £2 million, depending on the measurement used.)

With the Restoration of Charles II to the throne in 1660 the castle and the forest were taken back to the ownership of the Duchy. Sir John Granville was made the Rider and Master Forester of Dartmoor and the Lydford Castle courts continued to be held to regulate the Forest. Repairs to the dilapidated building do not appear to have been carried out, however, and in 1704 a report was drawn up for the government, noting that the Stannary laws could not be enforced without a working prison.

Work was carried out between 1616 and 1733, bringing the castle back into good order. As part of this, the spine wall was rebuilt properly, and the second floor windows enlarged. The courtroom featured a chair for the Stannary court judge, additional seating for the court officials and a railed, public section around the outside of the room. The courtroom also doubled as a hall for village dances and feasts. At the start of the 19th century, however, Sir Thomas Tyrwhitt, the Lord Warden of the Stannaries, began the construction of Dartmoor Prison at Princetown. Dartmoor Prison and Princetown grew increasingly important and courts began to be held there instead of Lydford Castle.

The castle declined once again, the courtroom became unsafe to use and by 1833, the remaining judicial fittings had been stripped out. In the middle of the 19th century the Duchy of Cornwall rejected proposals to repair the castle in order to bring it back into service as being too expensive, but the castle site was enclosed to prevent injuries to children who might be tempted to play on the stonework. By the 1870s, the town of Lydford was vastly reduced in importance from the medieval period and the castle's roofs and floors had either collapsed or been removed.

=== 20th-21st centuries ===
The Duchy of Cornwall continued to own Lydford Castle into the 20th century. Albert Richardson, the architect to the Duchy estate, proposed converting the property into a private house in 1912, but the duchy turned down the project. In 1932 the Duchy gave the castle to the Office of Works. Repairs were carried out in the 1930s and the 1950s, and archaeological investigations were undertaken in the 1960s. In the 21st century, the castle is controlled by English Heritage and operated as a tourist attraction. Historian Andrew Saunders has described the castle as architecturally significant, being "the earliest example of a purpose-built gaol" in England. The earthworks of the Norman fort are owned by the National Trust and are also open to the public. Both castle sites are protected under law as ancient monuments.

== See also ==
- Castles in Great Britain and Ireland
- List of castles in England
- Hexham Old Gaol, a 14th-century prison
- Dalton Castle, a 14th-century prison
