= Walter of London =

Walter of London was the Dean of Wells between 1335 and 1350.
