= Edmund Archer (priest) =

Edmund Archer, D.D. (1673–1739) was an Anglican Archdeacon in the first half of the eighteenth century.

Archer was born in the parish of St Mary-at-Hill and educated at St John's College, Oxford. He held livings in Taunton, Creech St. Michael, Aisholt, Thurlbear and North Petherton. He was Archdeacon of Taunton from 1712 to 1726; and then of Archdeacon of Wells until his death.
