= Matthew Brailsford =

Matthew Brailsford was the Dean of Wells between 1713 and 1733.
