= William Fitzwilliam (Dean of Wells) =

William Fitzilliam or Fitzjames was Dean of Wells Cathedral from 1540 to his resignation and surrender of the Deanery in late 1547.

== Early life ==
William Fitzwilliam was most likely born in 1522 in Yorkshire. His parents are unknown, but he was probably born into the Fitzwilliam family of Yorkshire. The Fitzwilliam’s were a minor gentry family, gaining most of their wealth in the 1460s due to Edmund Fitzwilliam’s service to Richard, Duke of York and his son, Edward IV. The family did not exercise much authority outside Yorkshire until one William Fitzwilliams was added to the household of Henry VIII c. 1500. This William Fitzwilliam would serve Henry VIII as an ambassador, Privy Councilor, Treasurer of the Household, and Lord Admiral, among a host of other offices. The Earl of Southampton was the major patron to William Fitzwilliam, future Dean of Wells, and was the most likely cause of Fitzwilliam’s preferments.

Fitzwilliam first occurs in the historical record as a gentleman servant to the Earl of Southampton in 1538. Being a "servant" of Southampton did not mean that Fitzwilliam was a domestic servant in Southampton's employment. Instead, Fitzwilliam was considered an "honourable" servant, or one who works by choice for someone of higher social standing. In the muster of 1539, Fitzwilliam was listed as one of 24 gentlemen in Southampton's service. Fitzwilliam's service to Southampton was both in deference to the Earl's rank and also given with the expectation of Southampton's influence and patronage in future. Fitzwilliam served as a witness and was able to sign his own name on depositions and confessions collected by Southampton in 1538. Southampton was investigating reports of unrest in Surrey and Kent as a result of rumors about new taxes on cattle. With the Pilgrimage of Grace fresh in their minds, Thomas Cromwell and Southampton were quick to identify the source of the rumors and prevent any further disturbances. Fitzwilliam signed his name on at least three documents submitted to Cromwell as a result of Southampton’s investigation. Southampton trusted Fitzwilliam, and engaged him as a courier to pick up £1000 from Cromwell for financing the construction of Calshot Castle and forts in East and West Cowes. Fitzwilliam may also have gone to Ireland in 1539 on Southampton's order.

== Dean of Wells ==
Fitzwilliam's service to the Earl of Southampton paid off in December 1540. The Chapter of the Cathedral of Wells had appointed Thomas Cromwell as their dean in October 1537, at the behest of King Henry. Cromwell's fall from grace and execution in 1540 left several offices in government open, as well as the Deanship of Wells. The Earl of Southampton was able to acquire Cromwell's position as Lord Privy Seal, which augmented his influence with the King. Cromwell was executed in July 1540, but the sub-dean of Wells, William Bowreman, did not request permission from Bishop John Clerk until 2 November. Southampton was well placed to promote his client and servant, William Fitzwilliam, to the well funded position as Dean of Wells, but Fitzwilliam was only 18 at the time, and was listed as a scholar at Oxford. Through Southampton's influence, Fitzwilliam secured a dispensation from Archbishop Cranmer. Fitzwilliam's dispensation granted him the ability to hold ecclesiastical office for seven years without taking orders, and permitted non-residence so that he could continue to study at Oxford. The day after the dispensation was granted, the Bishop Clerk, who was in London with the Archbishop at the time, granted the Chapter of Wells permission to elect a dean. Fitzwilliam was elected soon after, and wrote to the King for permission to elect a Bishop two months later.

Fitzwilliam rarely resided at the cathedral during his tenure as Dean, and the sub-dean handled most of the day-to-day operations. Fitzwilliam was likely studying at Oxford at this time. Fitzwilliam did not possess any other benefices besides those that accompanied his deanship, and so the position was his only means of supporting himself at Oxford. The practice of using a benefice to fund study at Oxford or Cambridge was common in the early sixteenth century, and had precedents in the Catholic Church under Rome. Archbishop Cranmer granted near identical dispensations under the Act Concerning Peter's Pence and Dispensations passed by parliament in 1534. Fitzwilliam dispensed patronage of his own during his absence from the deanery. In 1542, he presented a Thomas Slatter to the vicarage of Wedmore. He granted a James Dyer the office of steward Bempstone, and appointed a George Pygott as Bailiff of Bempstone and keeper of Wedmore park. Fitzwilliam received his Bachelor of Arts from Oxford on 7 April 1544. He received his degree as a "compounder", which was one who paid double the normal fee for a degree, and was, according to Anthony Wood, "usually done by rich dignitaries". This likely meant that Fitzwilliam was a "grand compounder", which was one whose father or sponsor (likely Southampton) was worth more than 40£ per year.

== Surrender of Deanery and Post-Dean career ==
Soon after the death of Henry VIII in 1547, Fitzwilliam and the Deanery fell into disarray. By March, the recently created Duke of Somerset, Edward Seymour sought to augment his holdings in the county Somerset and surrounding areas. The previous Archdeacon of Wells, Polydore Vergil, had surrendered the lands of the Archdeaconry to the crown in 1546. Now Somerset seized lands from the Bishop and persuaded Fitzwilliam to surrender the lands of the Deanery. The Deanery was in limbo between March 1547 and January 1548, as the lands had been granted to Somerset in July, but the offices and Cathedral still existed. The Chapter even elected Polydore Vergil and two others in October 1547 to represent the chapter in Convocation. Fitzwilliam's dispensation expired when he turned 25, which would be sometime in late 1547 or early 1548. He had to either take Holy orders, or surrender his position as Dean. Fitzwilliam decided to do the latter, and for his surrender of both the lands and office, he was rewarded with an annual pension of about 400 marks (266£, 20d). No contemporary source records the pension, but an incomplete audit conducted in 1552 of the crown's finances includes the pension in its list of expenses for the year 1550-1551.

In January 1548, John Goodman was appointed to serve as Dean, and the Deanery was re-founded as a "Crown donative." The first parliament of Edward VI granted lands from the Archdeaconry and various benefices to re-create the Deanery with reduced lands and funds. The Dean's house was taken by Somerset, and then regranted to the Bishop, William Barlow. Fitzwilliam disappears from the historical record after the report of the 1552 commission, and it not known where he resided after his surrender of the church lands.

== Note on Names and Aliases ==
As Tobias Hug remarked, "forenames as well as surnames were very fluid," in early modern England. Aliases were uncommon but not unheard of in Tudor England, and these aliases were not necessarily a nefarious way to avoid identification. William Fitzwilliam was known by at least two other names during his time as Dean of Wells: William Fitzjames and Thomas Fitzwilliam. Thomas Fitzwilliam only occurs once, in the patent rolls of Edward VI, stating "Thomas Fitzwilliams, late dean of Wells has placed his deanery in the king's hands and retired." All other records refer to him as either William Fitzwilliam or William Fitzjames. The alias of Fitzjames was first applied by Anthony Wood in his Athenae Oxoniensis. It is not clear what source Wood was using in his list of graduates of Oxford, but later antiquarians and historians followed his lead. Antiquarians John Le Neve, Bishop White Kennett, John Hutchins, and Joseph Foster followed Wood in listing Fitzwilliams as Fitzjames.

Contemporary sources tend to refer to Fitzwilliam by that name. The records of his association with the Earl of Southampton, his dispensation in the records of the Faculty Office Register, documents in the Cathedral Chapter Act Books at Wells, the register of Bishop Knight, the register of the University of Oxford, and the record of his pension in the Commission Report of 1552 all use the name William Fitzwilliam. Two seventeenth-century historians also prefer the name Fitzwilliam over Fitzjames: Francis Godwin in 1616, and Henry Wharton, publishing at the same time as Wood in 1691. Most modern historians, including William Page, Phyllis Hembry, Derrick Bailey, L. S. Colchester, and the modern editors of Fasti Ecclesiae Anglicanae use Fitzwilliam in their works.
