= Henry Husee =

Dean of Wells in 1302

Henry Husee was the Dean of Wells during 1302.
