= Henry Ignatius Dudley Ryder =

British Roman Catholic clergyman

Henry Ignatius Dudley Ryder (3 January 1837 – 7 October 1907, Edgbaston, Birmingham) was an English Roman Catholic priest of the Birmingham Oratory and controversialist.

== Life ==
Ryder's lifelong connection with John Henry Newman and the Oratory began as a private pupil, when he was about twelve years old. The only interruption was a year at the English College at Rome and a few months at the Catholic University of Ireland in Dublin, of which Newman was rector, before he began in December, 1856, his Oratorian novitiate. In 1863 he was ordained priest.

After Newman's death he was elected superior of the Birmingham Oratory and held this office till his health gave way. He was the last survivor of "my dearest brothers of this House, the Priests of the Birmingham Oratory" to whom Newman dedicated his Apologia Pro Vita Sua. His grave is with theirs and Newman's at Rednal, a small country house belonging to the Birmingham Oratory, about seven miles from Birmingham.

His life was uneventful. He cared little for notoriety or even fame. Once only did he push himself forward. This was in 1867–8, when he attacked W. G. Ward, at that time editor of Dublin Review. His opinions on papal infallibility, according to Ryder, were a caricature, and he delivered his protest in three pamphlets. He was criticised for them.

== Works ==
Apart from a number of articles in American and English magazines, he published:

- "Idealism in Theology, a Review of Dr. Ward's scheme of Dogmatic Authority" (London, 1867);
- "A letter to W. G. Ward on his theory of Infallible Instruction" (London, 1868);
- "Postscriptum to Letter, etc." (London, 1868);
- "A critique upon Mr. Foulkes' Letter" (London, 1869);
- "Catholic Controversy", a reply to Littledale's "Plain Reasons" (London, 1880);
- "Poems Original and Translated" (Dublin, 1882).

There is besides "Essays of the Rev. H. I. D. Ryder, edited by Francis Bacchus" (London, 1911).

== Family ==
He was the eldest son of George Dudley Ryder, one of the numerous clergymen of the Church of England who followed in the steps of Newman, and Sophia Lucy, daughter of John Sargent. He was received into the Catholic Church at Rome in 1846. The grandfather, Henry Dudley Ryder, was a prominent Anglican Evangelical bishop. The three other Sargent daughters married Samuel Wilberforce, Henry Wilberforce, and Henry Edward Manning.
