= Alexander Ainslie =

Alexander Colvin Ainslie (1833–1903) was Archdeacon of Taunton from 1896 until his death on 5 June 1903.

Ainslie was educated at University College, Oxford, and ordained in 1854. After a curacy at Sopworth he held incumbencies at Corfe (1854–1871), Henstridge (1871–1883, Langport (1883–1891) and Over Stowey (1891–1896).

He was Canon Residentiary of Wells, and was in early 1900 appointed Precentor of Wells Cathedral.
