= Leonius (Dean of Wells) =

Leonius was the Dean of Wells during 1213.
