= John Saracenus =

Dean of Wells

John Saracenus was the Dean of Wells during 1250.
