= Ralph of Lechlade =

Dean of Wells in 1217

Ralph of Lechlade was the Dean of Wells during 1217.
