= George Lukin =

George William Lukin was the Dean of Wells between 1799 and his death on 27 November 1812.

He was born in Braintree, Essex on 26 September 1739 and educated at Eton and Christ's College, Cambridge. He was Prebendary of Westminster from 1797 until his appointment as dean.
