= Peter of Chichester =

Peter of Chichester was the Dean of Wells during 1220.
