= Ralph Barlow (priest) =

Ralph Barlow (1573/4–20 July 1631) was the Dean of Wells between 1621 and 1631.

His will was proved on 7 November 1631. It is a long document, starting with a mini-sermon, listing his children and his ecclesiastical appointments. He then bewails his (unnamed) wife's profligacy: pawning her petticoats and getting him to redeem them, and indulging in needless lawsuits. He names six children in his will, Thomas, John, Richard, Elizabeth, Ralph and Henry, all baptised at Winchester Cathedral.
