= Dean of Wells =

Head of the Chapter of Wells Cathedral in England

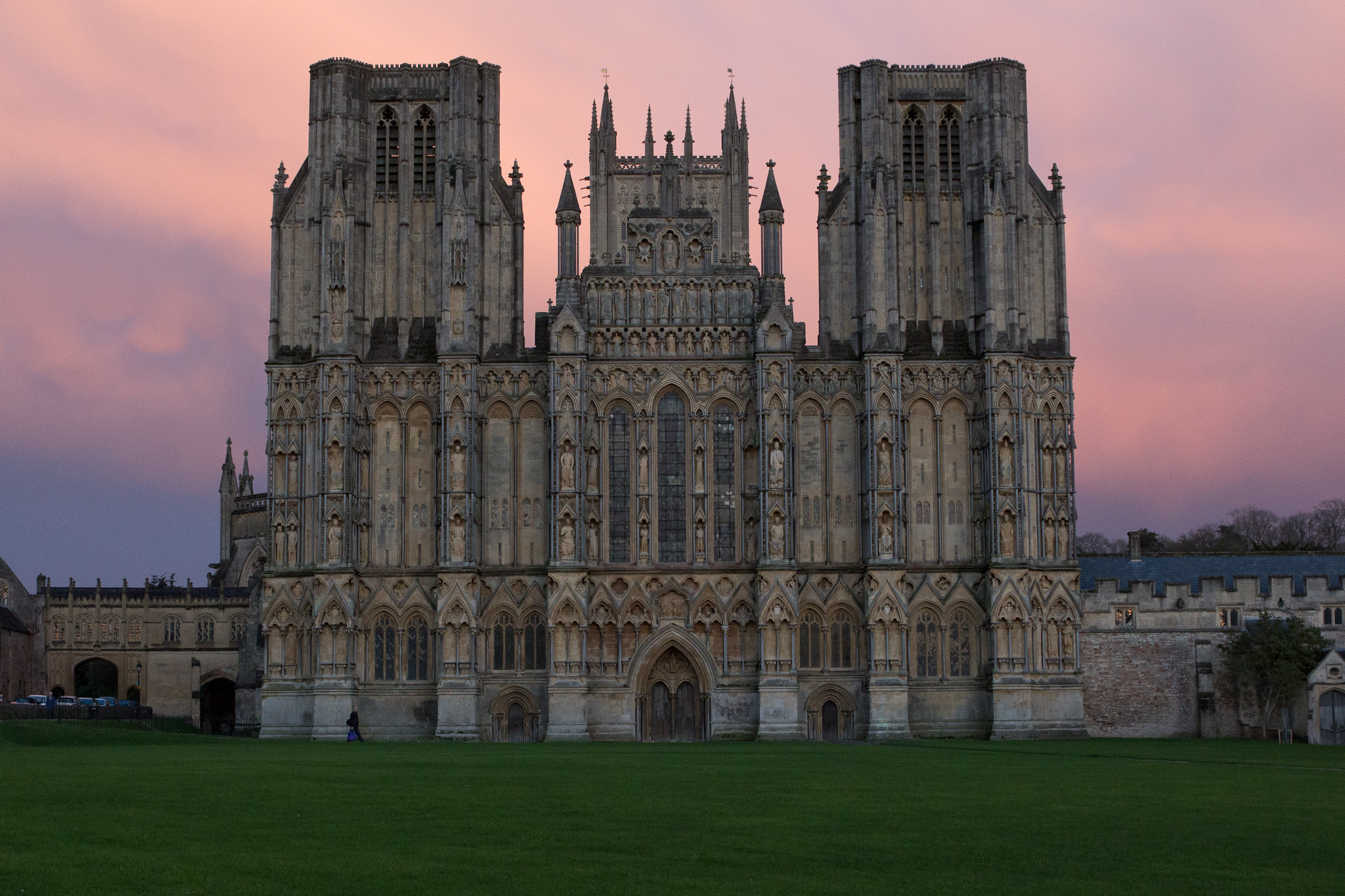
Wells Cathedral

The Dean of Wells is the head of the Chapter of Wells Cathedral in the Mendip district of Somerset, England. The dean's residence is The Dean's Lodging, 25 The Liberty, Wells.

== List of deans ==
=== High Medieval ===
- 1140–1164: Ivo
- 1164–1189: Richard of Spaxton
- 1190–1213: Alexander
- 1213–1216: Leonius
- 1216–1219: Ralph of Lechlade
- 1219–1236: Peter of Chichester
- 1236–1241: William of Merton
- 1241–1253: John Saracenus
- 1254–1256: Giles of Bridport
- 1256–1284: Edward of Cnoll
- 1284–1292: Thomas Bytton
- 1292–1295: William Burnell
- 1295–1302: Walter Haselshaw

=== Late Medieval ===
- 1302–1305: Henry Husee
- 1305–1333: John Godelee
- 1333–1333: Richard of Bury
- 1334–1335: Wibert of Littleton
- 1335–1349: Walter of London
- 1349–1350: Thomas Fastolf
- 1350–1361: John of Carleton
- 1361–1379: Stephen Penpel
- 1379–1381: John Fordham
- 1381–1396: Thomas Thebaud (of Sudbury)
- 1397–1398: Henry Beaufort
- 1398–1401: Nicholas Slake
- 1401–1410: Thomas Tuttebury
- 1410–1413: Richard Courtenay
- 1413–1413: Thomas Karneka
- 1413–1423: Walter Medeford
- 1423–1424: John Stafford
- 1425–1446: John Forest
- 1446–1467: Nicholas Carent
- 1467–1472: William Witham
- 1472–1498: John Gunthorpe

=== Early modern ===
- 1498–1525: William Cosyn
- 1525–1529: Thomas Wynter (also Archdeacon of York, Archdeacon of Richmond (1526–1529), Archdeacon of Suffolk (1526–1529) and Archdeacon of Norfolk (from 1529))
- 1529–1537: Richard Woleman
- 1537–1540: Thomas Cromwell
- 1540–1547: William Fitzwilliam (or Fitzjames)
- 1548–1550: John Goodman (deprived)
- 1551–1554: William Turner (deprived)
- 1554–1561: John Goodman (reinstated)
- 1561–1568: William Turner (restored)
- 1570–1573: Robert Weston
- 1574–1589: Valentine Dale
- 1590–1602: John Herbert
- 1602–1607: Benjamin Heydon
- 1607–1621: Richard Meredith
- 1621–1631: Ralph Barlow
- 1631–1641: George Warburton
- 1642–1644: Walter Ralegh
- 1660–1670: Robert Creighton
- 1670–1704: Ralph Bathurst
- 1704–1713: William Grahme (or Graham)
- 1713–1733: Matthew Brailsford
- 1733–1736: Isaac Maddox
- 1736–1738: John Harris
- 1739–1766: Samuel Creswicke
- 1766–1799: Lord Francis Seymour

=== Late modern ===
- 1799–1812: George Lukin
- 1812–1831: Hon Henry Ryder
- 1831–1845: Edmund Goodenough
- 1845–1854: Richard Jenkyns
- 1854–1881: George Johnson
- 1881–1891: Edward Plumptre
- 1891–1911: Thomas Jex-Blake
- 1911–1933: Armitage Robinson
- 1933–1950: Richard Malden
- 1951–1958: Frederic Harton
- 1958–1962: Christopher Woodforde
- 1962–1973: Irven Edwards
- 1973–1989: Patrick Mitchell
- 1990–2003: Richard Lewis
- 2004–2015: John Clarke
- 2015–2016: Andrew Featherstone (acting)
- 2016–2023: John Davies
- 2023–2024: Anne Gell (acting)
- 2024–present: Toby Wright
