= Dean of Blackburn =

Church of England senior clergy member

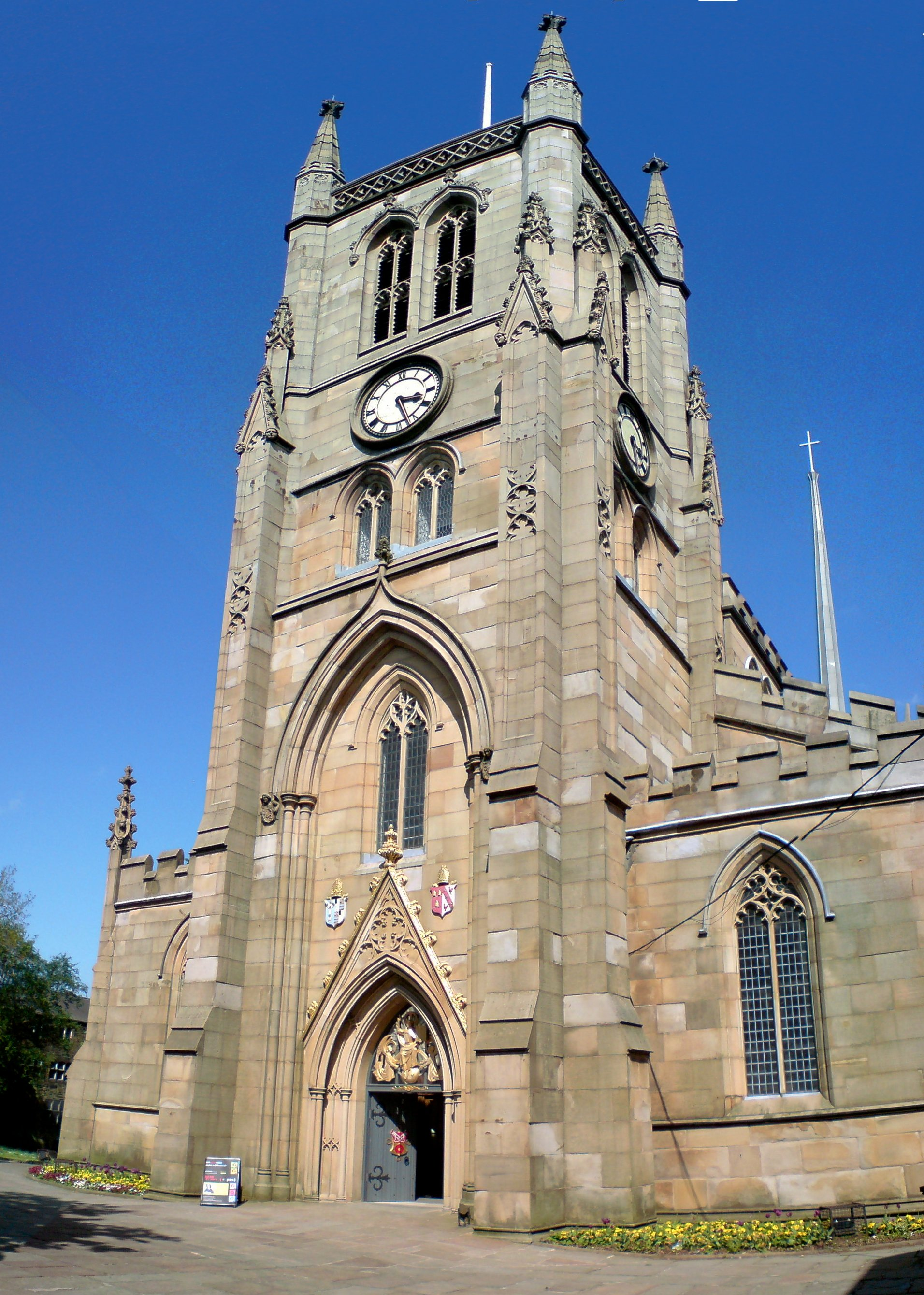
Blackburn Cathedral

The Dean of Blackburn is the head (primus inter pares – first among equals) and chair of the chapter of canons, which is the ruling body of Blackburn Cathedral.

The dean and chapter are based at the Cathedral Church of Blackburn St Mary the Virgin with St Paul in Blackburn. The post was designated as provost before September 2000, which was then the equivalent of dean at most English Cathedrals. The cathedral is the mother church of the Diocese of Blackburn and seat of the Bishop of Blackburn.

The incumbent dean is Peter Howell-Jones, who was installed on 25 March 2017.

On Friday 25th June 2025 it was announced that the current dean, The Very Rev Peter Howell Jones had been suspended from post until the outcome of a complaint made under the Clergy Disciplinary Measure. The Bishop of Blackburn stated an Interim Dean will be appointed.

== List of Deans ==
=== Provosts ===
- 1931–1936: John Sinker
- 1936–1961: William Kay
- 1961–1972: Norman Robinson
- 1973–1992: Lawrence Jackson
- December 1992 – September 2000: David Frayne (became Dean)

=== Deans ===
- September 2000 – September 2001: David Frayne (previously Provost)
- November 2001 – 17 June 2016 (res.): Christopher Armstrong
- June 2016 – March 2017 (acting): Philip North, Bishop Suffragan of Burnley
- 25 March 2017 – present: Peter Howell-Jones
