= Peter Howell-Jones =

British Anglican priest

The Very Reverend Peter Howell-Jones
- Dean of Blackburn
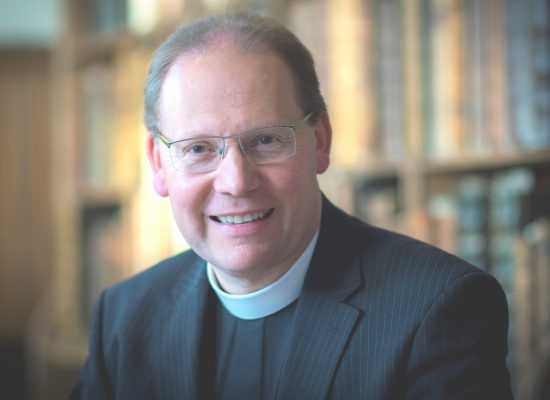
- Church: Church of England
- Diocese: Diocese of Blackburn
- Other post: Vice-Dean of Chester Cathedral (2011 – 2017)

Orders
- Ordination: 1993 (deacon); 1994 (priest)

Personal details
- Born: 1962 (age 63–64) Liverpool, United Kingdom
- Denomination: Anglicanism
- Spouse: Sian
- Children: Four
- Education: Hillfoot Hey High School
- Alma mater: Huddersfield Polytechnic; Bretton Hall College; St John's College, Nottingham

Peter Howell-Jones (born 1962) is a British Anglican priest. He has been the Dean of Blackburn since his installation at Blackburn Cathedral on 25 March 2017. He was previously vice-dean and a residentiary canon of Chester Cathedral from 2011.

On Friday 27th June 2025 the Bishop of Blackburn, the Rt Revd Philip North, announced that Peter Howell-Jones had been suspended from his post as Dean of Blackburn pending the outcome of a complaint made under the Clergy Disciplinary Measure.

== Early life and education ==
Howell-Jones was born in 1962 in Liverpool, England. He was educated at Hillfoot Hey High School, a comprehensive school in Liverpool. He trained as a singer and conductor at the School of Music of Huddersfield Polytechnic, and graduated with a Bachelor of Music (BMus) degree in 1984. He then undertook teacher training at Bretton Hall College, and completed his Postgraduate Certificate in Education (PGCE) in 1985.

Having graduated from university and completed his teacher training, Howell-Jones worked as a music teacher. He then worked as an "impresario for a leading music tour operator". In 1990, Howell-Jones entered St John's College, Nottingham, an open evangelical Anglican theological college, to train for ordained ministry and to study theology. He completed his training in 1993 and left the college to begin his curacy. He continued his studies on a part-time basis and graduated from St John's College, Nottingham with a Master of Arts (MA) degree in 1996.

== Ordained ministry ==
Howell-Jones was ordained in the Church of England as a deacon in 1993 and as a priest in 1994. From 1993 to 1998, he served his curacy in the Benefice of Walsall St Matthew (consisting of St Matthew's Church, St Luke's Church, and St Martin's Church) in the Diocese of Lichfield. Then, from 1998 to 2005, he was Vicar of St Michael's, Boldmere, Sutton Coldfield in the Diocese of Birmingham.

Since 2005, Howell-Jones's ministry has been based at one of the Church of England's cathedrals, and he has served on the executive of the Association of English Cathedrals since June 2014. From 2005 to 2011, he served as Bishop's Adviser for Mission and was a Residentiary Canon of Birmingham Cathedral. He served as Acting Dean of Birmingham between the retirement of Robert Wilkes and the appointment of Catherine Ogle. On 25 September 2011, he was installed as Vice-Dean of Chester Cathedral. As Vice-Dean, he had a number of duties "including the day-to-day oversight and running of the Cathedral, estate management, the hospitality and mission brief, and ... overseeing the restructuring and redefining of the Cathedral's business activity."

On 26 November 2016, it was announced that Howell-Jones would be the next Dean of Blackburn, in succession to Christopher Armstrong. He was installed as dean during a service at Blackburn Cathedral on 25 March 2017. As Dean of Blackburn, he is 'first among equals' at Blackburn Cathedral and the senior priest of the Diocese of Blackburn.

== Personal life ==
Howell-Jones is married to Sian. Together they have four children: two sons and two daughters.
