= Norman Robinson (priest) =

Norman Robinson (18 February 1905 – 27 April 1973) was an Anglican priest. He was educated at Ulverston Grammar School and Liverpool University and began his working life as a teacher of Mathematics at Quarry Bank School, Liverpool Ordained in 1935, he held curacies at Mossley Hill and Southport before a spell at Lancaster Priory. After incumbencies at Newbarns, Hawcoat, Penrith and West Derby he was appointed Provost of Blackburn in 1961. He retired in 1972 and died a year later.

== Notes ==
Religious titles
Preceded by William Kay	Provost of Blackburn; 1973–1992	Succeeded by Lawrence Jackson
