= Association of English Cathedrals =

Unincorporated association of English Anglican Cathedrals

- Formation: 1990
- Website: Association of English Cathedrals

The Association of English Cathedrals (AEC) was formed in 1990 as an unincorporated association to represent the interests of English Anglican Cathedrals in negotiations with English Heritage about a Cathedrals Grant Scheme. It was incorporated as a company and registered as a charity in 2008. The Association of English Cathedrals (AEC) represents the 42 Anglican cathedrals in England, along with the royal peculiars of Westminster Abbey and St George's Chapel, Windsor. Since its founding the role of the AEC has expanded to support the mission of cathedrals and their operations.

The AEC promotes the spiritual, cultural, and communal roles and fosters collaboration while raising the profile of English cathedrals. In 2023 the Journal of Beliefs & Values: Studies in Religion & Education in an issue devoted to cathedral studies cited the AEC in the context of advancing interdisciplinary research on cathedrals' roles in modern society.

The Association of English Cathedrals has sponsored reports and studies including The Economic and Social Impacts of Cathedrals in England (2004), Spiritual Capital: the Present and Future of English Cathedrals (2012), The Taylor Review: Sustainability of English Churches and Cathedrals (2017), and The Economic and Social Impacts Of England’s Cathedrals (2019).

During the 2020 "Year of Cathedrals, Year of Pilgrimage" the Pilgrim Passport program was launched by the AEC.

Keeping You Connected is the newsletter of the AEC which, with other resource documents, is available at the AEC website.

The AEC is a member of the Heritage Alliance, the Churches Legislation Advisory Service, and the Charity Tax Group.

== Members and Associate Members ==
Members of the Association of English Cathedrals are the 42 Anglican cathedrals. St George’s Chapel at Windsor Castle, Westminster Abbey, the Cathedral Isle of Man and St Davids Cathedral are associate members.

Members

- St Philip's Cathedral, Birmingham
- Blackburn Cathedral
- Bradford Cathedral
- Bristol Cathedral
- Canterbury Cathedral
- Chester Cathedral
- Chichester Cathedral
- Coventry Cathedral
- Derby Cathedral
- Durham Cathedral
- Ely Cathedral
- Exeter Cathedral
- Gloucester Cathedral
- Guildford Cathedral
- Hereford Cathedral
- Leicester Cathedral
- Lichfield Cathedral
- Lincoln Cathedral
- Liverpool Cathedral
- Manchester Cathedral
- Newcastle Cathedral
- Norwich Cathedral
- Christ Church Cathedral, Oxford
- Peterborough Cathedral
- Portsmouth Cathedral
- Ripon Cathedral
- Rochester Cathedral
- St Albans Cathedral
- St Edmundsbury Cathedral
- St Paul's Cathedral
- Salisbury Cathedral
- Sheffield Cathedral
- Southwark Cathedral
- Southwell Minster
- Truro Cathedral
- Wakefield Cathedral
- Wells Cathedral
- Winchester Cathedral
- Worcester Cathedral
- York Minster

Associate Members

- St. George’s Chapel, Windsor Castle
- Westminster Abbey
- Cathedral Isle of Man
- St Davids Cathedral

== Cathedral Networks ==
The AEC website lists Cathedral Network members consisting of cathedral personnel, volunteers, or related professionals. The AEC enables collaboration, professional development, and mutual support among those in similar roles across cathedrals.

Some specialist organizations have their own websites and newsletters, others are organized through AEC which integrates activities into broader cathedral initiatives. The network members focus on different aspects of cathedral activities and help fulfill AEC goals of advancing the Christian religion, supporting cathedrals' mission, and promoting education, heritage, and community harmony.

=== Assistant Cathedral Organists Association ===
The Assistant Cathedral Organists Association provides professional development for assistant organists and choir directors at cathedrals and similar institutions and supports AEC's emphasis on music and liturgy by fostering expertise among junior music staff in member cathedrals.

=== Association of Cathedral Clerk of the Works ===
The Association of Cathedral Clerk of the Works is a network for operational roles. It offers mutual support, information sharing, and central resources for clerks of works/managers responsible for cathedral maintenance and aids cathedrals with advice on projects and best practices.

=== Association of Cathedral Lay Clerks ===
The Association of Cathedral Lay Clerks represents professional adult singers (lay vicars, songmen, etc.) in UK cathedrals and choral foundations; promotes choral standards, training, and welfare. It contributes to the AEC's promotion of musical excellence in worship.

=== Cathedral Administration and Finance Association ===
The Cathedral Administration and Finance Association formed in the 1980s to share best practices in administration, finance, fundraising, and volunteer management; organizes conferences and works with cathedrals on cost-effective central tasks. It collaborates with AEC on financial and operational issues to enable efficient business practices.

=== Cathedral and Church Shops Association ===
The Cathedral and Church Shops Association supports visitor shops in cathedrals and churches. It ties into AEC's advocacy for cathedrals' economic roles, including tourism and funding."

=== Cathedral Architects Association ===
The Cathedral Architects Association promotes excellence in cathedral building care and offers mutual support, experience-sharing, and events on topics like conservation and lighting. AEC collaborates on fabric-related policies, training, and advocacy for heritage protection."

=== Cathedral Archives, Libraries and Collections Association ===
The Cathedral Archives, Libraries and Collections Association facilitates preservation, access, and professional development for cathedral archivists, librarians, and collection managers and shares resources on digitization and conservation. It publishes a newsletter.

=== Cathedral Constables Association ===
The Cathedral Constables Association preserves the tradition of cathedral constables. It provides training and best practices for safety in cathedrals. It enhances AEC's focus on community safety and welcoming environments in member cathedrals.

=== Cathedral Organists Association ===
The Cathedral Organists Association is a forum for directors of music at cathedrals and collegiate foundations. It holds biannual conferences for professional development. It is integral to AEC's liturgical and musical initiatives, including events like organ festivals.

=== Cathedrals Plus ===
Cathedrals Plus is a network for visitor care and education staff in Anglican cathedrals, as well as Roman Catholic cathedrals, and major churches. It promotes welcoming practices and outreach." It is AEC-affiliated under visitor networks and supports AEC's campaigns like pilgrimage routes. It includes several abbeys, shrines and major churches, and also organizations relating to church heritage and tourism.

=== Cathedrals’ Workshop Fellowship ===
The Cathedrals’ Workshop Fellowship was established to provides education, training, and support for maintaining historic buildings." It aligns with AEC's heritage and sustainability efforts, including funding for repairs."

=== Choir Schools Association ===
The Choir Schools Association represents 44 choir schools attached to cathedrals, churches, and chapels. The Association ensures high education and musical training for choristers. It collaborates with the AEC network on chorister welfare, music schemes, and promotes the choral tradition in cathedrals."

=== College of Deans ===
The College of Deans provides an opportunity for deans of Church of England cathedrals (plus Westminster Abbey and St George’s Chapel) to meet biannually and hold an annual conference, discuss mutual interests and provides peer support.

=== Deans' Vergers Conference ===
The Deans' Vergers Conference is an annual conference for support and discussion. As part of the AEC network for liturgical roles it supports daily worship operations in member cathedrals.

=== Precentors' Conference ===
The Precentors' Conference is for canons, minor canons, and incumbents responsible for music and liturgy in English cathedrals, peculiars, and greater churches. It is AEC-affiliated for worship leadership and enhances shared liturgical practices across cathedrals.
