= Sinker =

Sinker may refer to:

People:

- George Sinker (1900–1986), MA, Bishop of Nagpur and Provost of Birmingham Cathedral
- John Sinker (1874–1936), MA, an Anglican priest and author

Other uses:

- Sinker (fishing), a weight used in fishing
- Sinker (baseball), a type of baseball pitch
- Sinker (mining), a person who is employed to sink new shafts
- Sinker, a character in Beyond the Black Stump, an Australian comic strip
- Sinker nail, commonly used in wood-frame construction
- Sinker root, an enlarged, somewhat straight to tapering plant root that grows vertically downward
