= Frederick Bridge =

English organist, composer, teacher and writer

Bridge in 1897

Sir John Frederick Bridge CVO (5 December 1844 – 18 March 1924) was an English organist, composer, teacher and writer.

From a musical family, Bridge became a church organist before he was 20, and he achieved his ambition to become a cathedral organist by the age of 24, at Manchester Cathedral. After six years there, he was invited to become organist at Westminster Abbey, where he remained for the rest of his career. He instituted several changes to modernise and improve the music-making at the Abbey and organised the music for several state occasions, including two coronations.

As a teacher and lecturer, Bridge held posts at the Royal College of Music, Gresham College and the University of London. His students included the composers Arthur Benjamin and Noel Gay, the organists Edward Bairstow and Herbert Brewer, the conductor Landon Ronald and the early music pioneer Arnold Dolmetsch. His public lectures at Gresham College attracted large audiences, and they covered a wide range of subjects and musical periods.

For 25 years, Bridge was conductor of the Royal Choral Society, with whom he performed many new works, including some of his own compositions and works by the British composers Elgar, Vaughan Williams and Parry.

== Life and career ==
=== Early years ===
Bridge aged nine

Bridge was born in Oldbury, then in Worcestershire, in central England, the eldest son of John Bridge and his wife, Rebecca née Cox. In 1850, his father was appointed a vicar-choral of Rochester Cathedral. Young Bridge was admitted to the cathedral choir as a "practising boy" (that is, a probationer). The choirboys were educated by another of the vicars-choral. The régime was severe in discipline and rudimentary in curriculum, but among the alumni of the choir school of this period were future organists of four English cathedrals and of Westminster Abbey. They included Bridge's younger brother Joseph, who eventually became organist of Chester Cathedral.

Bridge first participated in a great national commemoration in 1852, when, aged eight, he was allowed to help toll the cathedral bell to mark the death of the Duke of Wellington. When Bridge was nine, he and his father were members of the choir assembled by Michael Costa for the opening of the Crystal Palace in June 1854. At the age of 14 Bridge left the cathedral choir and was apprenticed to John Hopkins, organist of Rochester Cathedral. While still studying under Hopkins, Bridge was appointed organist of the village church of Shorne in 1851, and the following year moved to Strood Parish Church. From 1863 to 1867 he studied composition with John Goss, professor of harmony at the Royal Academy of Music. Bridge said in 1897, "Very happy and improving lessons they were and it is impossible for me to over-estimate the value of the instruction given by that dear, simple-minded musician."

In 1865 Bridge was appointed organist of Holy Trinity Church, Windsor. There he was encouraged and influenced by George Job Elvey, organist of St. George's Chapel, Windsor, and made many friends including John Stainer and the young Hubert Parry. During his time at Windsor, Bridge passed the examination for the Fellowship of the Royal College of Organists, in 1867, and took his Bachelor of Music degree at the University of Oxford.

=== Cathedral organist ===
After four years at Windsor, Bridge achieved his ambition to become a cathedral organist, successfully competing for the post at Manchester Cathedral. He spent six years there from 1869, with his brother Joseph as his assistant. While at Manchester, he took his Doctor of Music degree at Oxford in 1874, and was professor of harmony at Owens College from 1872.

Under Bridge's leadership musical standards of the cathedral were improved, and the unsatisfactory old organ was replaced. The state of the existing instrument was described by The Manchester Guardian as "not only discreditable to Churchmen, but especially objectionable when existing in the cathedral church of a wealthy diocese.". The churchwarden, William Houldsworth gave £5,000, and a magnificent new instrument was built by Hill and Sons of London.

=== Westminster Abbey ===
Bridge's house in Little Cloisters, Westminster Abbey

In 1875, the organist and master of the choristers at Westminster Abbey, James Turle, retired. Bridge was invited to succeed him. As Turle was permitted to retain his former title in retirement, Bridge was formally "Permanent Deputy-Organist of Westminster Abbey" until Turle's death in 1882, but he was effectively in sole charge from the outset. The Musical Times wrote:

The appointment of Dr. Bridge to the post of organist at Westminster Abbey … will be welcomed by all interested in the cause of church music. The improvement in the services at Manchester Cathedral since Dr. Bridge has held the position of organist, may be regarded as a proof that in the responsible office which he has now accepted he will do his utmost to advance the character of the music in the Abbey; and we sincerely hope that the Dean and Chapter will allow him that unlimited power over the choir which may enable him to raise it to the high state of efficiency which the public has a right to expect.

According to a younger organist, Sir Walter Alcock, Bridge fulfilled those hopes: "He reformed many unsound traditions in the choir, such as life-tenure of posts as vicars-choral and inadequate rehearsal of boys and men together. The services soon became renowned through his marked gifts as a trainer of boys' voices."

To the general public, Bridge became known for organising the music, and composing some of it, for great state occasions, notably Queen Victoria's jubilee (1887), the Coronation of King Edward VII (1902), the national memorial service for Edward VII (1910), George V's coronation (1911), and the reinauguration of Henry VII's Chapel as the chapel of the Order of the Bath (1913). In the musical world he was known for his special commemorations of English composers of the past. The first was a celebration of Henry Purcell in 1895, marking the bicentenary of Purcell's death. Bridge presented Purcell's Te Deum "purged of the 18th century accretions which had overlaid it". Later commemorations were of Orlando Gibbons (1907), and Samuel Sebastian Wesley (1910).

Having worked successfully to have the organ at Manchester replaced, Bridge found himself obliged to do the same at the Abbey. He described the instrument he inherited as "a very old-fashioned affair". In 1884 the organ was completely rebuilt by Hill and Son to a very high specification.

=== Teacher, musicologist and conductor ===
When the National Training School of Music was set up in 1876 under Arthur Sullivan, Bridge was appointed professor of organ. When the school was reconstituted as the Royal College of Music in 1883 he was appointed professor of harmony and counterpoint. In 1890 he was elected Gresham professor of music at Gresham College, London, and in 1903 he was appointed professor of music at the University of London. According to Guy Warrack and Christopher Kent in the Grove Dictionary of Music and Musicians, "accounts of his teaching are not complimentary", but he was generally regarded as a highly successful lecturer, and Alcock's Oxford Dictionary of National Biography article states, "Because of his persuasive style and apt illustrations, his lectures drew large audiences." His pupils at the Royal College and the Abbey included Edward Bairstow, Arthur Benjamin, Edward Morris Bowman, Herbert Brewer, Arnold Dolmetsch, Noel Gay, Lloyd Powell and Landon Ronald.

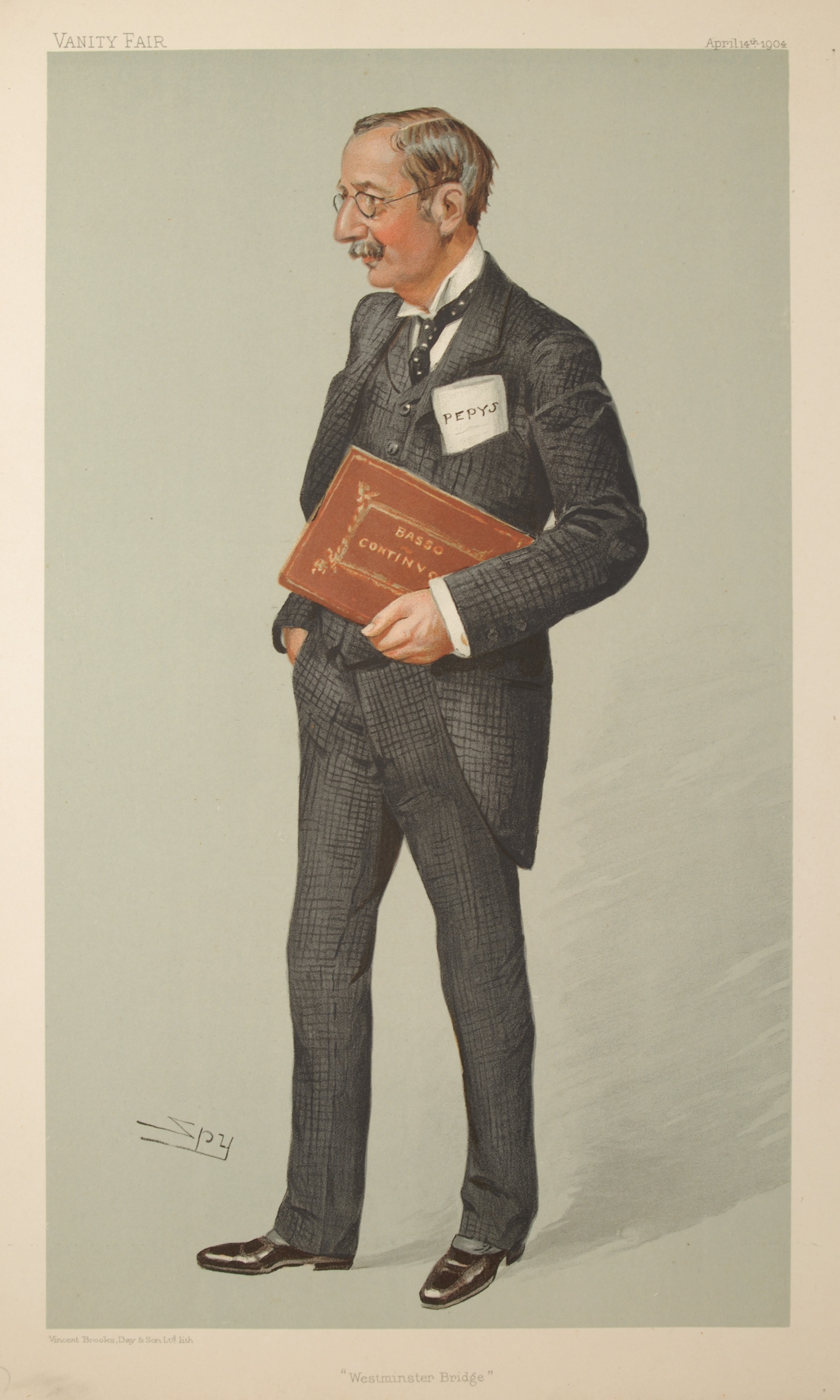
"Westminster Bridge" by "Spy", 1904

When Sir George Grove retired as head of the Royal College at the end of 1894, Bridge, along with Hubert Parry, Charles Villiers Stanford, Walter Parratt and Franklin Taylor, was seen as a strong candidate to succeed him. Parry was chosen, and Bridge and the others continued to serve under him.

Bridge's enthusiasms were many and varied. His lectures at Gresham College were well known for the wide range of topics he covered. His articles for the musical press showed a similar variety; some examples are: "Purcell and Nicola Matteis"; "Samuel Pepys – A Lover of Musicke"; "A Seventeenth Century View of Musical Education"; and "The Musical Cries of London in Shakespeare's Time". In 1899 he was a pioneer of authentic performance of Handel's score for Messiah, purging it of 18th and 19th century reorchestrations.

Bridge's range of enthusiasms caused some carping. The Times commented:

There have been those who said that he was not a great organist, (Note: According to Eugene Goossens, Bridge's position as organist of Westminster Abbey was "a post which, as virtuoso, he filled none too brilliantly. Known as a left-footer' on the organ, his colleagues were wont to refer to the upper notes of the pedal organ at the Abbey as virgin soil.") and who disputed the accuracy of his scholarship. Perhaps it is not possible to do all the things Sir Frederick Bridge did and do them all well. He never claimed that he did them all well; he claimed that he did them, and took an immense delight in doing and in talking about it afterwards. … "Spy's" well-known cartoon of him, with "Basso Continuo" under his arm and Pepys's Diary protruding from his pocket, exactly describes him. Pepys was his lifelong friend, and, like him, Bridge went through life dwelling on the things that did please him mightily."

Besides being in 1903 a founding member of the Samuel Pepys Club, Bridge was the conductor of the Royal Choral Society from 1896 to 1921. In an article celebrating his work with the society, Herman Klein listed the new works that it had performed under Bridge's baton. They included six works by Elgar, four apiece by Parry, Stanford, and Samuel Coleridge-Taylor, and works by Alexander Mackenzie, Frederic Cowen, Hamilton Harty, Ethel Smyth and Vaughan Williams.

=== Personal life ===
Bridge was married three times, first, in 1872, to Constance Ellen Moore (d. 1879); second, in 1883, to Helen Mary Flora Amphlett (d. 1906), and third, in 1914, to Marjory Wedgwood Wood (d. 1929). There were a son and a daughter of the first marriage, and a daughter of the second.

Bridge was knighted in 1897. He was created a Member (4th class) of the Royal Victorian Order (MVO) in August 1902, for ″valued services recently rendered in connection with the coronation (of King Edward VII)″, and promoted to a Commander of the order (CVO) in 1911. He was awarded honorary degrees from the universities of Durham (1905) and Toronto (1908).

Bridge retired as organist of the Abbey in 1918, but was granted the title of "Organist Emeritus" and continued to live in the Little Cloisters until his death six years later at the age of 79. His funeral took place at Glass, Aberdeenshire, where he was buried on 21 March 1924.

== Works ==
=== Music ===
Bridge's larger-scale works include the choral pieces Mount Moriah (oratorio) (1874); Boadicea (cantata, G.E. Troutbeck, 1880); Callirhoë: a Legend of Calydon (cantata, W.B. Squire, 1888); He giveth his Beloved Sleep (meditation, Elizabeth Barrett Browning, 1890); The Repentance of Nineveh (oratorio, Joseph Bennett, 1890); The Inchape Rock (ballad, Robert Southey, 1891); The Cradle of Christ: Stabat mater speciosa (canticle, J.M. Neale, 1894); The Flag of England (ballad, Rudyard Kipling, 1899); The Forging of the Anchor (dramatic scene, S. Ferguson, 1901); The Lobster's Garden Party (cantata, S. Wensley, 1904); A Song of the English (ballad, Kipling, 1911); and Star of the East (Christmas fantasy, Lady Lindsay, 1922).

Bridge also wrote and edited many carols, and was editor of the Westminster Abbey Hymn-Book and the Wesleyan Hymn-Book. Among his shorter works are many songs, both comic and serious. The former were popular, and Bridge commented that he had written a good deal of serious music, but that nobody seemed to want to hear it.

==== Orchestra ====
- 1886 - Morte d'Arthur, overture (Town Hall, Birmingham, 6 May 1886)
- Minuet and trio

==== Choral and vocal ====
- 1874 - Mount Moriah: The Trial of Abraham's Faith (D.Mus. submission), oratorio (Brixton Choral Society, Angell Town Institution, Brixton, London, 1876)
- 1880 - Boadicea, cantata (Highbury Philharmonic Society, London, 31 May 1880)
- 1883 - Hymn to the Creator (Highbury Philharmonic Society, Athaneum, Highbury New Park, London, 7 May 1883; Worcester Festival, 7 September 1884)
- 1885 - Rock of Ages: Jesus pro me perforatus (Birmingham Festival, 27 August 1885)
- 1885 - The Festival: Ballad of Haroun al Raschid, choral ballad for tenor and bass soli, male voices and orchestra
- 1888 - Callirhoë: A Legend of Calydon, cantata (Birmingham Festival, 30 August 1888)
- 1890 - The Repentance of Nineveh, dramatic oratorio (Worcester Festival, 11 September 1890)
- 1890 - He giveth his Belovèd Sleep, meditation
- 1892 - The Inchcape Rock, choral ballad (Finsbury Choral Association, Holloway Hall, Finsbury, London, 21 January 1892)
- 1892 - The Lord's Prayer from Dante's Purgatorio (Gloucester Festival, 9 September 1892)
- 1894 - The Cradle of Christ (Stabat mater speciosa), canticle for Christmas (Hereford Festival, 12 September 1894)
- 1897 - The Flag of England, ballad for chorus and orchestra (Royal Choral Society, Albert Hall, London, 6 May 1897)
- 1899 - The Frogs and the Ox, humorous cantata for children
- 1899 - The Ballad of "The Clampherdown", ballad for chorus and orchestra (Royal Choral Society, Royal Albert Hall, London, 7 December 1899)
- 1901 - The Forging of the Anchor, dramatic scene (Gloucester Festival, 11 September 1901)
- 1902 - The Spider and the Fly, humorous cantata for children
- 1904 - The Lobster's Garden Party; or, The selfish shell-fish, humorous cantata for children
- 1911 - A Song of the English (Royal Choral Society, Royal Albert Hall, London, 2 February 1911)
- 1922 - The Star of the East, Christmas fantasy for contralto solo (ad lib.) and chorus (1922)

==== Anthems, etc. ====
- 1869 - The Lord ordereth a good man's going, anthem
- 1870 - Give unto the Lord the Glory, anthem
- 1870 - We declare unto you glad tidings, anthem for Easter
- 1871 - The Lord hath chosen Zion, anthem
- 1873 - God hath not appointed us to wrath, anthem
- 1876 - Magnificat and Nunc dimittis in D
- 1876 - It is a good thing to give thanks, anthem
- 1882 - Happy is the man that findeth wisdom, anthem
- 1884 - In sorrow and in want, carol
- 1886 - Morning and Evening services in G
- 1887 - Blessed be the Lord thy God, homage anthem for Queen Victoria's golden jubilee (Westminster Abbey, London, 21 June 1887)
- 1887 - Joy, ye people, carol
- 1887 - Child divine, carol
- 1888 - The God of heaven, he will prosper us, anthem
- 1889 - O sing unto the Lord with thanksgiving, anthem
- 1890 - When my soul fainted within me, anthem for Easter
- 1890 - All jubilant with psalm and hymn, carol
- 1891 - Hosanna - Alleluia!, anthem
- 1892 - Sweeter than songs of Summer, carol
- 1897 - Behold my servant, anthem for Christmas
- 1897 - Sing unto the Lord, anthem
- 1900 - O Lord, Thy words endureth, anthem
- 1902 - Kings shall see and arise, homage anthem for the coronation of King Edward VII and Queen Alexandra (Westminster Abbey, London, 9 August 1902)
- 1903 - All my heart this night rejoices, carol
- 1904 - In that day, anthem for Christmas
- 1911 - Te Deum in A
- 1911 - Rejoice in the Lord, O ye Righteous, homage anthem for the coronation of King George V and Queen Mary (Westminster Abbey, London, 22 June 1911)
- 1911 - The King, o Lord, in Thee this day rejoices, hymn for the coronation of King George V and Queen Mary (Westminster Abbey, London, 22 June 1911)
- 1912 - Carmen feriale Westmonasteriense
- 1912 - Benedictus in A
- 1912 - Jesu, dear child of God, carol
- 1913 - The "Bowe bells", carol for chorus, organ and carillon
- 1920 - Ring Christmas bells, carol
- 1920 - By Nazareth's green hill, carol
- 1920 - Would I had been a shephard, carol
- 1921 - Carol of the three kings, carol
- 1922 - Cradle song, carol
- 1923 - The inn at Bethlehem, carol
- 1924 - When I was yet young I sought wisdom, anthem

==== Part-songs, etc. ====
- 1870 - Flowers, part-song
- 1875 - Christmas Bells, part-song
- 1879 - With thee, sweet Hope!, glee
- 1886 - The Goose, part-song
- 1892 - Crossing the bar, part-song
- 1892 - An old rat's tale, humorous part-song for male voices
- 1892 - Ode to the terrestrial globe, humorous part-song for male voices
- 1894 - To Phoebe, humorous part-song
- 1895 - John Barleycorn, humorous ballad for male voices
- 1895 - The flirt, humorous part-song for male voices
- 1896 - Hurrah! hurrah! for England, part-song
- 1896 - Two snails, humorous part-song
- 1898 - The Cabbage and the Rose, unison song with action ad lib.
- 1899 - Weep no more, woful shepherds, madrigal
- 1899 - For all the wonder of thy regal day, part-song in honour of Queen Victoria's 80th birthday (Windsor and Eton Madrigal Society, Windsor Castle, Windsor, 29 May 1900)
- 1909 - The Song of the Milking, unison song
- 1912 - When father votes, humorous quartet
- 1912 - The nights, unison song
- 1913 - The goslings, humorous part-song
- 1915 - Peace (a Fable), part-song
- 1916 - Who has seen the wind?, unison song
- 1918 - Violets, unison song
- 1919 - Spring!, humorous part-song
- 1919 - Peace lives again, motet
- 1919 - May the Lord bless thee, motet
- 1920 - God's goodness hath been great to thee, motet

==== Songs ====
- 1880 - Forget-me-not
- 1880 - Tears
- 1890 - Bold Turpin
- 1896 - Katawampus Kanticles
- 1904 - The England of to-morrow
- 1913 - Bells, bells, what did you say?, Christmas song
- 1918 - A song of England, two-part song
- 1921 - The coming of Christmas
- 1921 - Green grows the holly tree

==== Organ ====
- 1885 - Sonata in D
- 1896 - Meditation, for organ or harmonium

=== Scores and manuscripts ===
Novello, Ewer & Co., London, published vocal scores of The Ballad of "The Clampherdown", Boadicea, Callirhoë, The Cradle of Christ, The Flag of England, Forging the Anchor, The Frogs and the Ox, He giveth his Belovèd Sleep, Hymn to the Creator, The Inchcape Rock, The Lobster's Garden Party, The Lord's Prayer, Mount Moriah, The Repentance of Nineveh, Rock of Ages, Katawampus Kanticles and The Spider and the Fly. Metzler & Co., London, issued the vocal score of The Festival. Bosworth & Co., London, issued the vocal score of The Star of the East.

Autograph manuscripts of Boadicea, The Flag of England, The Frogs and the Ox, God Save the Queen, The Inchcape Rock, Kings shall see and arise, The Lord's Prayer, the Magnificat in G, The Repentance of Nineveh, Rejoice in the Lord and Rock of Ages are held by the Library of the Royal College of Music, London (Add. Mss 5048).

=== Books ===
In addition to several educational works for Novello & Co, Bridge published two books based on his lectures, Samuel Pepys, Lover of Musicke (1903) and Twelve Good Musicians from John Bull to Henry Purcell (1920), as well as a substantial volume of memoirs, A Westminster Pilgrim (1918). Reviewing the memoirs, the critic H. C. Colles wrote that the book showed why Bridge was "even more widely loved as a man than he has been respected as a musician."

Cultural offices
Preceded by Joseph Harris	Organist and Master of the Choristers of Manchester Cathedral; 1869–1875	Succeeded by James Kendrick Pyne
Preceded by James Turle	Organist and Master of the Choristers of Westminster Abbey; 1882–1919	Succeeded by Sydney Nicholson

== Notes and references ==
Notes

=== Sources ===
- Goossens, Eugene (1951). Overture and Beginners. London: Methuen.
