= William Kay (priest) =

William Kay DSO MC** (28 December 1894 – 6 January 1980) was an Anglican priest.

Born in Blackburn, he was educated at Durham University and ordained in 1919, following distinguished wartime service with the Manchester Regiment. He was a Curate at Rochdale and later Vicar of Cresswell, Derbyshire. Later he was Rural Dean of Newark before a 25-year stint as Provost of Blackburn Cathedral.

Religious titles
Preceded by John Sinker	Provost of Blackburn; 1936 – 1961	Succeeded by Lawrence Jackson
