= Joseph John Harris =

English organist and composer

Joseph John Harris (1799 – 10 February 1869) was an English organist and composer, from 1848 organist of Manchester Cathedral.

== Life ==
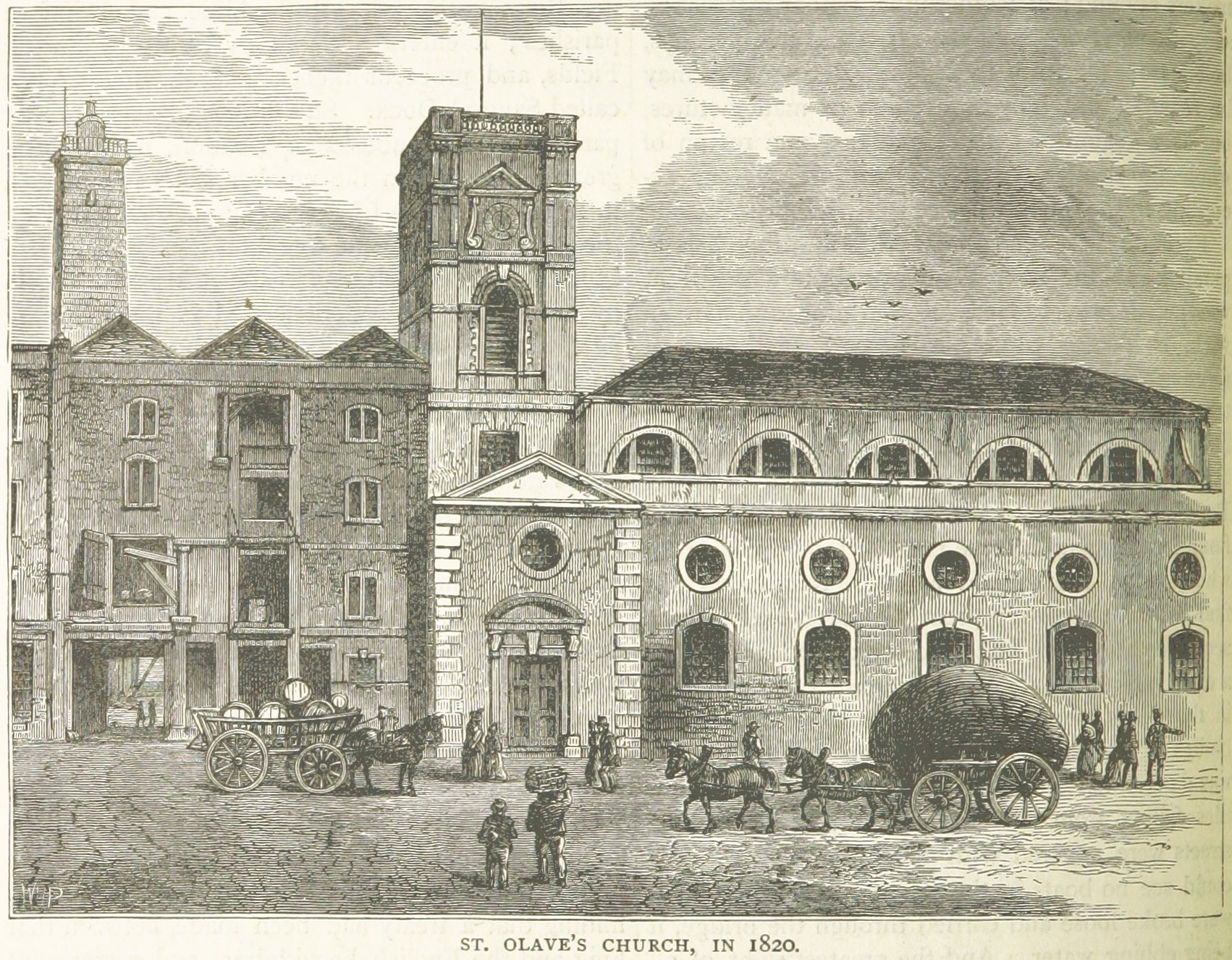
St Olave's Church, Southwark, in 1820. The church was demolished in 1926.

Harris was born in London in 1799. For seven years he was in the choir of the Chapel Royal, St James's Palace, under John Stafford Smith, and in 1823 was appointed organist of St Olave's Church, Southwark. He held a similar position at Blackburn Cathedral from 1828 to 1831, when he became singing-master and assistant organist at the Manchester Collegiate Church, now Manchester Cathedral. In 1848 he succeeded William Sudlow as organist and choirmaster of the cathedral. He was for many years connected as director with the Gentlemen's Glee Club and other societies in Manchester. He died in Manchester on 10 February 1869.

== Works ==
He published:

1. A selection of psalm and hymn tunes, adapted to the psalms and hymns used in the church of St Olave, Southwark (1827)
2. The Cathedral Daily Service (1844)
3. The Musical Expression: a Guide for Parents (1845)

He published also anthems, glees, sacred songs and piano pieces. Six chants and three arrangements for responses to the commandments are included in Joule's Collection of Chants (2nd edition 1861).

== Family ==
His son Joseph Thorne Harris (1828–1869) was reputed to be a musician of great talent and accomplishments, a brilliant pianist and a prolific writer of musical compositions, a few of which were printed.

Cultural offices
Preceded by none	Organist and Master of the Choristers of Blackburn Cathedral; 1828–1831	Succeeded by Henry Smart
Preceded by William Sudlow	Organist and Master of the Choristers of Manchester Cathedral; 1848–1869	Succeeded by Frederick Bridge
