= Philip North =

Bishop of Blackburn (Church of England)

The Right Reverend Philip North CMP
- Bishop of Blackburn
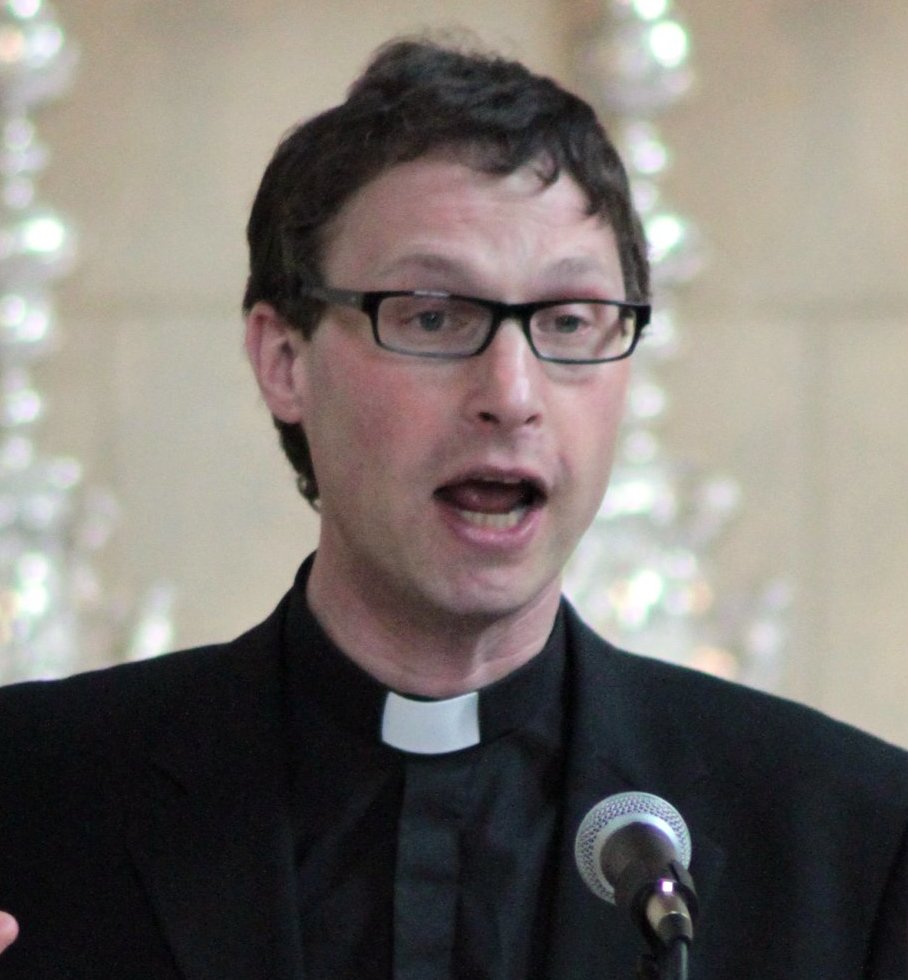
- North in 2010
- Church: Church of England
- Diocese: Blackburn
- In office: 25 April 2023 – present
- Predecessor: Julian Henderson
- Previous posts: Bishop suffragan of Burnley (2015–2023); Bishop-nominate of Sheffield (2017); Acting Dean of Blackburn (2016–2017); Bishop-designate of Whitby (2012); Team Rector of Old St Pancras (2008–2015)

Orders
- Ordination: 1992 (deacon); 1993 (priest)
- Consecration: 2 February 2015 by Martin Warner

Personal details
- Born: Philip John North; 2 December 1966 (age 59)
- Denomination: Anglicanism
- Education: University of York; St Stephen's House, Oxford

Philip John North CMP (born 2 December 1966) is a bishop in the Church of England. Since April 2023, he has served as Bishop of Blackburn, the diocesan bishop of the Diocese of Blackburn. He was previously Bishop of Burnley, a suffragan bishop in the same diocese, since 2015; and team rector of the parish of Old St Pancras.

It was announced in January 2017 that North had been nominated to become the next Bishop of Sheffield. He withdrew his acceptance of the nomination in March 2017 without taking up the post after concerns were raised about him being "unable to receive the ministry of women as bishops or priests" and his citing "highly individualised attacks" which he had received. In 2012, he had withdrawn his acceptance of the appointment as Bishop of Whitby primarily for the same reason.

== Early life and education ==
North was born on 2 December 1966 in North London. He was educated at The Latymer School, a selective grammar school in Edmonton, London. He studied history at the University of York, graduating with a Bachelor of Arts (BA) degree in 1988. He spent a year working as a pastoral assistant in Redhouse, Sunderland, before preparing for ordination at St Stephen's House, Oxford. He graduated from the University of Oxford with a BA degree in 1991; as per tradition, his BA was promoted to a Master of Arts (MA Oxon) degree in 2001.

== Ordained ministry ==
North was ordained in the Church of England as a deacon in 1992 and as a priest in 1993. He was a curate at Saint Mary and Saint Peter's in Sunderland until 1996, after which he became the vicar of Holy Trinity in Hartlepool until 2002, during which time he was also Hartlepool's area dean (2000-2002).

In 2002, North became priest administrator of the Anglican Shrine of Our Lady of Walsingham, also serving as priest-in-charge of Hempton and Pudding Norton from 2004 to 2007. In 2008 he became team rector in the parish of Old St Pancras and team vicar at St Michael's Church, Camden Town.

In 1997, North joined the Company of Mission Priests, a dispersed community (not a religious order) of male Anglican priests who do not marry and follow the Vincentian rule of life. In 2015, he was elected a member of the general council of the Society of Mary, an Anglican devotional society.

=== Episcopal ministry ===
On 19 October 2012, North was announced as Martin Warner's successor as Bishop of Whitby. On 16 December 2012, it was announced that North had withdrawn his acceptance of the post because of conflict between his views on women as priests and bishops, his love for the Parish of Old St Pancras and "the views of people in the Archdeaconry of Cleveland".

On 7 November 2014, it was announced that North had been selected as the next Bishop of Burnley. He was consecrated at York Minster on 2 February 2015. The laying on of hands was restricted to three bishops "who share his theological conviction regarding the ordination of women"; the other bishops at the service, including the only woman then consecrated as a bishop, Libby Lane, and John Sentamu, Archbishop of York, gathered around him during the consecration prayer instead. The three consecrating bishops were: Martin Warner, Bishop of Chichester; Tony Robinson, Bishop of Pontefract; and Glyn Webster, Bishop of Beverley. Warner also presided at the service's Eucharist in place of Sentamu. On 14 February 2015, he was installed as Bishop of Burnley at Blackburn Cathedral. In May 2016, it was announced that North was to also be Acting Dean of Blackburn during the vacancy in the deanery caused by the resignation of Christopher Armstrong on 17 June 2016 (although Armstrong departed Blackburn prior to this date). He later resigned the residentiary canonry on 31 August 2022 (the day of Julian Henderson's retirement, upon which North became acting diocesan bishop).

On 31 January 2017, it was announced that North was to be translated to become Bishop of Sheffield; his installation at Sheffield Cathedral had been scheduled for June 2017, by which point he needed to have been elected and confirmed. However, he withdrew his acceptance of the nomination on 9 March 2017 following several public objections on the basis of his rejection of the ordination of women and the number of women serving as priests in the diocese. In his statement of withdrawal, North cited "personal attacks". The Archbishop of Canterbury, Justin Welby, later described the affair as "deeply saddening for all involved" and "a setback".

In addition to serving as the Bishop of Burnley, he was an assistant bishop in the Diocese of Manchester during the vacancy in the See of Beverley (the Provincial Episcopal Visitor for traditionalist catholics in the Province of York) from January to November 2022. He has also been an honorary assistant bishop in the Diocese of Chester since 2022.

It was announced on 10 January 2023 that North had been nominated to become the next Bishop of Blackburn, the diocesan bishop of the Diocese of Blackburn. He legally took up the See of Blackburn at the confirmation on 25 April 2023 at York Minster of his election. His installation took place on 24 June 2023 at Blackburn Cathedral.

== Views ==
North supports the ordination of women as deacons, but does not support the ordination of women to the priesthood or episcopate. In relation to homosexuality and same-sex marriage, he has stated: "I don't believe we have the authority to make changes to the doctrine of marriage ... I would certainly utterly condemn homophobia, and hope that the churches of Sheffield are places where gay people felt welcome."

North is a member of the Council of Bishops of The Society.

In an interview for Sky News North stated "I think some of the anger expressed in the Brexit votes was because Englishness in some situations is seen as a cause of shame. If we can recover a courageous, compassionate and diverse Englishness I think people may recover some of that language with some degree of pride."

He has stated in a speech for the New Wine festival, "We are all trying massively hard to renew the Church. We are working like crazy, we are praying like mad, we are trying every new idea under the sun. Yet the longed-for renewal does not seem to come. In fact decline just seems to speed up. Why? Why are we struggling so much? I want to suggest that the answer is quite a straightforward one. It’s because we have forgotten the poor".

During the Church of England's February 2023 General Synod meeting, North was one of two bishops in the house to abstain in the successful vote to introduce blessings and prayers for same-sex relationships. He voted against introducing "standalone services for same-sex couples" on a trial basis during a meeting of the General Synod in November 2023; the motion passed.
