= David Frayne =

English Anglican priest (1934–2025)

David Frayne (19 October 1934 – 15 September 2025) was an English Anglican priest and Provost of Blackburn Cathedral.

== Biography ==
Frayne was born on 19 October 1934. He was educated at Reigate Grammar School and St Edmund Hall, Oxford, and ordained in 1961. He was Curate at St Michael, East Wickham. Then Priest in charge of St Barnabas, Downham. Frayne held incumbencies at The Barn Church, Kew, Caterham, St Mary Redcliffe with St John the Baptist Bedminster, Bristol, before he was appointed Provost of Blackburn in December 1992.

He retired in September 2001 as dean following the reclassification of all provosts the previous year.

Frayne died after a short illness at Southmead Hospital, on 15 September 2025, at the age of 91.

Religious titles
Preceded by Lawrence Jackson	Provost of Blackburn; 1992– 2001	Succeeded by Christopher John Armstrong
