= Kate Pugh =

Kate Pugh OBE FSA
- Occupation: Historian

Katharine "Kate" Riddell Pugh OBE FSA is a heritage professional.

== Career ==
From 2003 to 2016 Pugh served as the chief executive of the Heritage Alliance. In February 2017 Pugh became the chairman of the advisory board of the UK Cultural Protection Fund, distributed through the DCMS. She is a trustee and the honorary secretary of the Afghanistan Society and of Europa Nostra UK.

=== Awards ===
Pugh was awarded an OBE for services to heritage in the 2015 New Year Honours. She was elected as a fellow of the Society of Antiquaries of London on 4 April 2019.
