= Lawrence Jackson (priest) =

Lawrence Jackson AKC (22 March 1926 – 15 November 2002) was an Anglican priest.

A Yorkshireman, Jackson trained for the priesthood at King's College London (spending his final year at St Boniface College, Warminster) and was ordained in 1951. He was a Curate at St Margaret's Church, Leicester and then Vicar of Wymeswold. After further incumbencies at St James the Greater, Leicester and Holy Trinity, Coventry, he was appointed Provost of Blackburn in October 1973. He retired in December 1992 and died in 2002.

Religious titles
Preceded by Norman Robinson	Provost of Blackburn; 1973–1992	Succeeded by David Frayne
