= Christopher Armstrong =

Dean of Blackburn (born 1947)

Christopher John Armstrong (born 18 December 1947) is a priest in the Church of England, and former Dean of Blackburn.

== Early life ==
Armstrong was born on 18 December 1947. He was educated at Dunstable Grammar School and the College of the Venerable Bede, Durham University.

== Ordained ministry ==
He was ordained in 1976. He was curate at All Saints' Maidstone and then chaplain of the College of St Hild and St Bede. From 1985 to 1991 he was domestic chaplain to the Archbishop of York and diocesan director of ordinands. From then until his appointment as Dean of Blackburn he was vicar of St Martin's Scarborough. Armstrong resigned the Deanery of Blackburn effective 17 June 2016.

Religious titles
Preceded by David Frayne	Dean of Blackburn; 2001–2016	Succeeded by Philip North (Acting)
