= John Sinker =

Anglican priest and author

John Sinker (21 December 1874 – 24 April 1936) was an Anglican priest and author.

== Life ==
John Sinker was born into an ecclesiastical family, the fifth son of the Reverend Robert Sinker Educated at Cambridge University, he was ordained in 1898. He was Curate of Raughtonhead with Gatesgill and then Domestic Chaplain to the Bishop of Carlisle. In 1905 he became Vicar of Burneside and in 1910 of St. George's, Preston. From 1915 to 1922 he was Rural Dean of the Fylde. In 1922 he became Vicar of Blackburn and in 1931 its first Provost. He died in post. His son was the Rev John Blamire Sinker.

== Works ==
- Memoirs of the Rev. Canon Stock, 1905
- Into the Church’s Service, 1913
- The Prayer Book in the Pulpit, 1915
- The War: Its Deeds and Lessons, 1916
- The Round of the Church’s Clock, 1917
- Through the Grave and Gate of Death, 1919
- Plain Talks to Lancashire People, 1925

== Notes ==
Religious titles
Preceded by Inaugural appointment	Provost of Blackburn; 1931 – 1936	Succeeded by William Kay
