= Heritage Alliance =

Cultural heritage charity in London, England

The Heritage Alliance
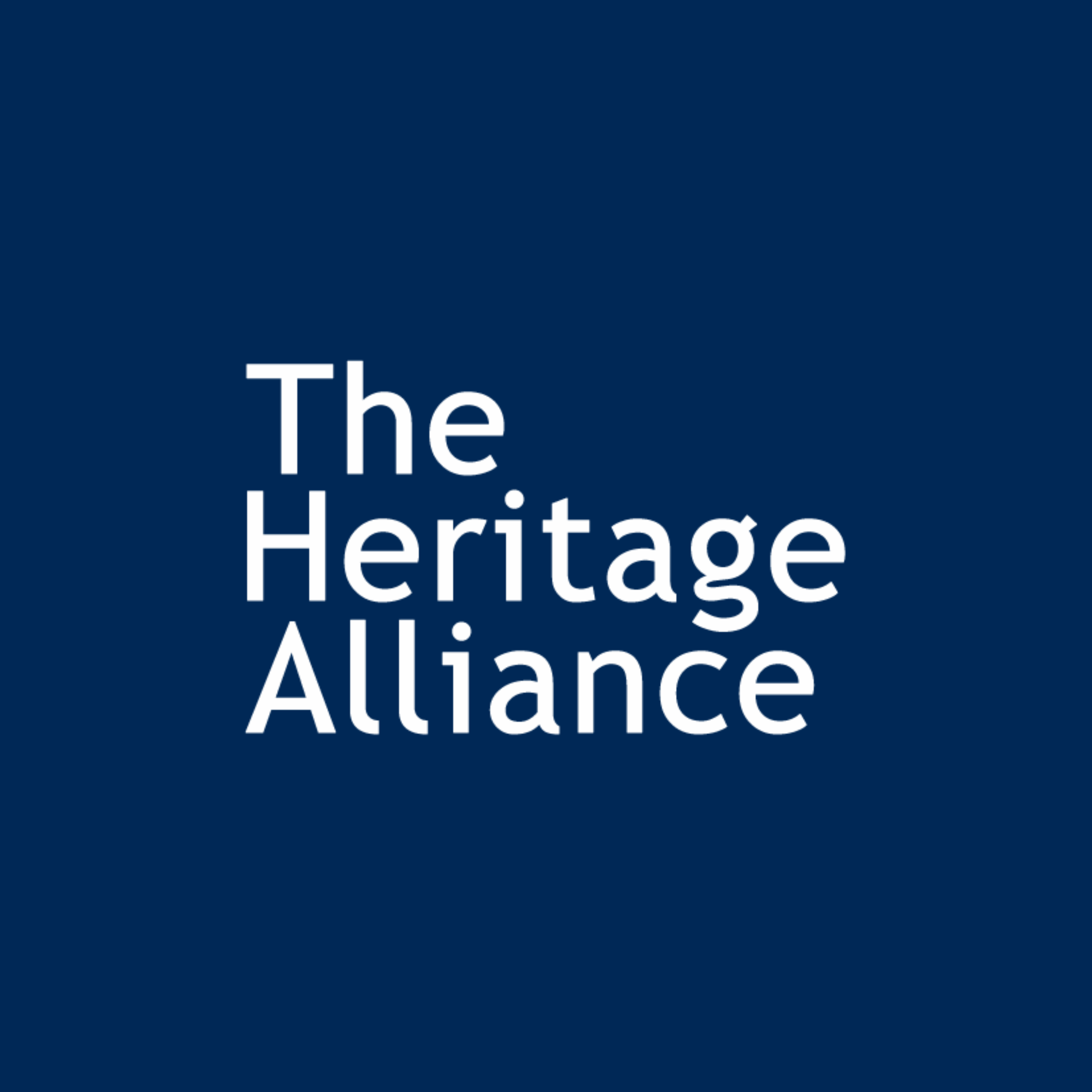
- Formation: 2002
- Purpose: heritage advocacy group
- Headquarters: London
- CEO: Lizzie Glithero-West
- Chair: Carole Souter CBE
- Website: https://www.theheritagealliance.org.uk/

The Heritage Alliance is a cultural heritage charity and the largest alliance of heritage organisations in the UK.

== History ==
The Heritage Alliance was established in October 2002 as Heritage Link and adopted its current name in February 2010.

== Membership and management ==
Over 200 independent organisations are represented by The Heritage Alliance.

The organisation has 12 Trustees. From July 2024, it was chaired by Carole Souter, who succeeded acting chair Dr Ingrid Samuel. Lizzie Glithero-West was appointed CEO in 2016; she was preceded by Kate Pugh, who held the role from 2003 to 2016.

== Work ==
The Heritage Alliance is an advocacy, advice and networking organisation. It is not a grant-awarding organisation.

In 2024, the Heritage Alliance published 'Heritage on the Brink', a report based on 18 months of data that detailed the impact of the cost of living crisis on the heritage sector. This report was part of a larger Heritage Manifesto, first published in 2023.

In 2023, the Heritage Alliance submitted evidence to the UK government Urban Green Spaces Inquiry. In 2019, it launched a report on Heritage and the Creative Industries. In 2010, it submitted evidence to a government enquiry on the funding of the arts and heritage.

=== Awards ===
Heritage Alliance awards the Heritage Alliance Heroes Award to recognise notable volunteer contributions.

=== Finances ===
In the year ending 31 March 2023, the organisation had an income of £712,964 and expenditure of £638,088.
