= Blackburn Cathedral =

- Cathedral Church of St Mary the Virgin with St Paul
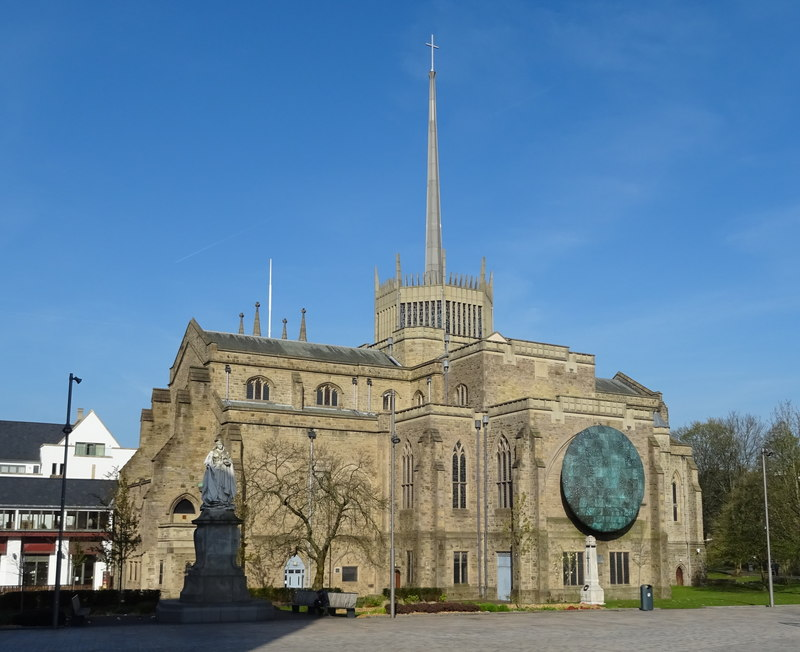
- Blackburn Cathedral from the east

- Shown within Blackburn town centre
- 53°44′50″N 2°28′53″W
- OS grid reference: SD 68360 27988
- Location: Blackburn, Lancashire
- Country: England
- Denomination: Church of England
- Website: www.blackburncathedral.com

History
- Former name: Parish church of St Mary the Virgin
- Consecrated: 1977

Architecture
- Architects: John Palmer; William Adam Forsyth; Laurence King
- Style: Gothic Revival
- Years built: 1820–1967

Administration
- Province: York
- Diocese: Blackburn

Clergy
- Bishop: Philip North
- Dean: Peter Howell-Jones

Listed Building – Grade II*
- Official name: Cathedral Church of St Mary the Virgin
- Designated: 28 November 1951
- Reference no.: 1239147

Blackburn Cathedral, officially known as the Cathedral Church of Saint Mary the Virgin with Saint Paul, is a Church of England cathedral situated in Blackburn, Lancashire, England. The site on which the cathedral stands has been home to a parish church for over a thousand years, and the first stone church was built there in Norman times, though the building was completely rebuilt in the 19th century. In 1926, the church was raised to cathedral status with the creation of the Diocese of Blackburn leading to a major programme of enlargement and enrichment.

== History and architecture ==
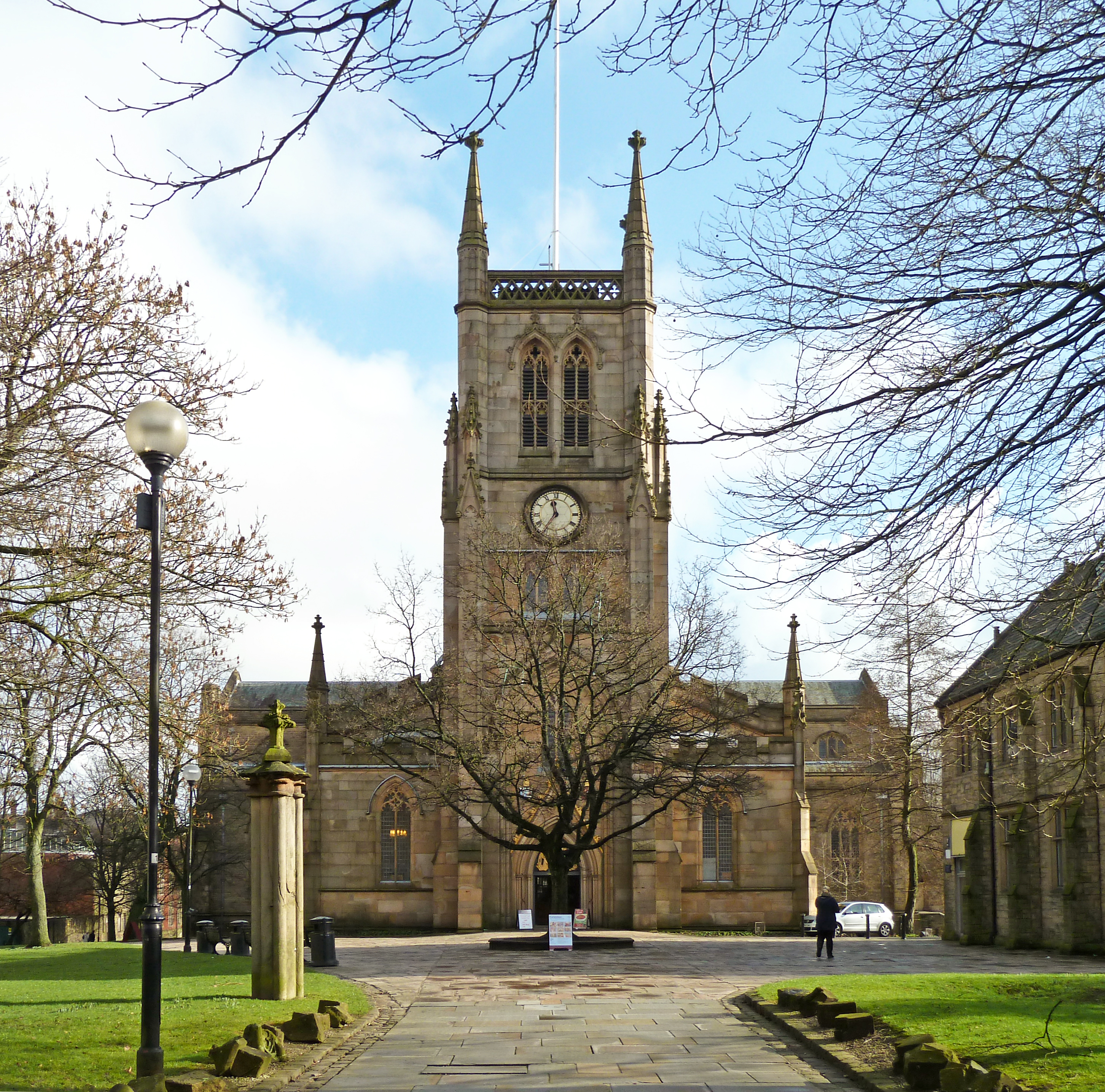
The west front of the cathedral

=== Medieval parish church of St Mary the Virgin ===
The site on which the present cathedral stands has been associated with Christian worship for many centuries. A settlement is listed at Blackburn in the Domesday Book and the foundations of a Norman stone church were discovered - and destroyed - as part of the 19th century rebuilding. Nevertheless, a much older foundation has been postulated. In his in 1347 work De Statu Blagborneshire, John Lindley, 5th Abbot of Whalley, claimed a foundation in the year 596 and this is still frequently cited.

=== 19th century church ===
Despite the church's much older origins, the earliest extant fabric of the present building dates only to the late Georgian era. The medieval church of St Mary the Virgin, which had been despoiled by Parliamentarian troops during the English Civil War, was found to be in a state of disrepair by the turn of the 19th century. As a result, the decision was taken to demolish and rebuild. Between 1820 and 1826 an entirely new church was constructed by the architect John Palmer of Manchester. Palmer was a pioneer of the Gothic Revival, the style that would come to dominate British ecclesiastical architecture by the middle of the 19th century, and this specific interest is noted in the building's heritage listing. Palmer's design for the church was done in imitation of the Decorated Gothic style, with a west tower of three stages rising above the western portal, tall three-light windows to both aisles, a clerestory over the nave, and a complete set of battlements.

=== Cathedral status and initial expansion plans ===
The Diocese of Blackburn was founded in 1926 by the then Bishop of Manchester, William Temple. Temple recognised the need to ensure that the expanding cotton towns of north Lancashire were provided - and seen to be provided - with the dedicated pastoral care of a newly created bishop. This intent was underlined by the translation of the parish church in Blackburn into the cathedral seat of the new bishopric.

Following the decision to elevate the church to a cathedral, fundraising began with the aim of aggrandisement to reflect the building's new-found importance. In 1933 an extension scheme devised by the architect William Adam Forsyth was approved. Forsyth's plan was to retain Palmer's church, extending the building east with a large choir and transept arms in a modern Gothic style. The centerpiece of the design was to be a central tower rising above the new transept crossing.

Work on Forsyth's design began in November 1938 with the laying of the foundation stone by Her Royal Highness Mary, Princess Royal and Countess of Harewood. However, wartime shortages of labour and construction materials bought progress to a virtual halt in 1941. Although construction did resume after the end of the Second World War, inflation had eroded funds. This would ultimately lead to the abandonment of Forsyth's plan following his death in 1951. Although both transept arms had largely been completed, Forsyth's intended choir and crossing tower remained on the drawing board.

=== Post-War expansion ===
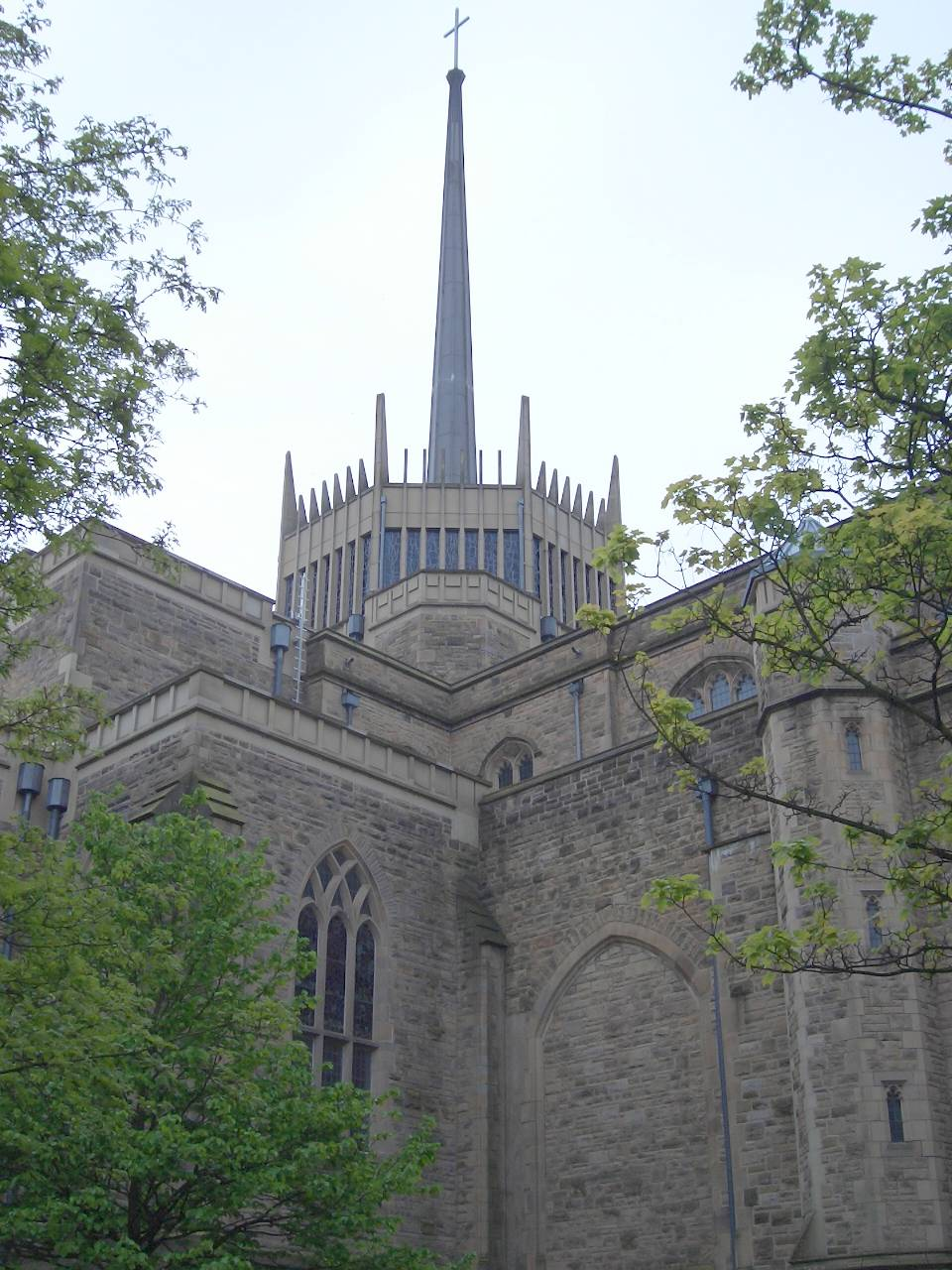
Lantern tower and aluminium flèche

Plans for completing the cathedral remained uncertain until 1961, when Laurence King was appointed as architect. His brief was to shorten Forsyth's intended eastward extension and provide a more economical solution to the planned central tower. King was attached to Faith Craft, a specialist provider of ecclesiastical fixtures and furnishings that had been established by the Society of the Faith in 1916. At the time of his appointment, King was in the later stages of rebuilding the Church of St Mary-le-Bow in the City of London, which had been ruined during The Blitz. Both projects shared a brief to work within a constrained budget, to which King's response was to utilise modern construction materials and design. His solution at Blackburn was to replace Forsyth's crossing tower with an octagonal roof lantern constructed from reinforced concrete, topped by an aluminium flèche. The sanctuary would be bought forward and placed directly beneath the lantern, reducing the need to extend the building east to the extent that had been proposed by Forsyth.

Work on King's plan began in 1962 and the crossing lantern was completed in 1967. Work then progressed to the east end of the cathedral where, beyond the crossing and eastern ambulatory, King constructed the Jesus Chapel. This truncated space was built as an alternative to Forsyth's intended choir. This intimate and lightly decorated chapel is frequently the venue of morning and evening prayer and weekday services. Annexed to the south of the Jesus Chapel is the smaller Chapel of St Martin of Tours, which serves as the regimental chapel of the East Lancashire Regiment.

Almost 50 years after the original expansion plan for the cathedral had begun, construction was finally declared complete in 1977. The consecration ceremony was held on 18 November that year in the presence of Princess Alexandra of Kent, marking the completion of a project that has transformed a 19th-century parish church into a modern cathedral.

=== Rebuilding of the lantern tower ===
King's reinforced concrete lantern tower began to show evidence of structural failure within a few years of completion. While attempts were made to manage the situation and arrest further deterioration, ultimately, the decision was taken to rebuild. The project was led by the architect Brian Lowe and undertaken between 1998 and 1999. Lowe, replaced the central structure in stone rather than concrete, while otherwise closely following King's original design. However the lantern's original glazing scheme, designed and manufactured by John Hayward, was not reinstated. Hayward had made use of an innovative applique glass technique to make the windows, which had also failed. As a result the lantern was entirely reglazed with new stained glass to an abstract design by Linda Walton.

=== 21st century developments ===
In 2001 a new piece of art was commissioned for the exterior east wall of the building to mark the Millennium. The sculpture by Mark Jalland, titled The Healing of The Nations, is formed of a steel and copper disk measuring 8m in diameter that contains thousands of interwoven fibre optics to create moving patterns of light. It reportedly cost £100,000. The artwork takes its name from a passage in the Book of Revelation, that the leaves of the tree are for the healing of the nations.

In 2009 the flagpole that rises above the parapet of the western tower was replaced with one carved by Mark Bridges. It is topped with a finial in the shape of a bishop's mitre, painted and gilded in gold leaf with the Red Rose of Lancaster emblem. The majority of the funding came from a bequest by Harold Thornber, who had worked at the cathedral as a warden and archivist.

On 17 April 2014, the cathedral played host to the Royal Maundy service. In keeping with tradition, Queen Elizabeth II handed out Maundy money to 88 men and 88 women. It was the Queen's first visit to the cathedral.

In 2016, Cathedral Court - a 16-year, £36 million project to expand the cathedral grounds - was completed. This development included the first new ecclesiastical cloister to be built in the United Kingdom since the 16th century, providing the cathedral with new residences for clergy and staff, a library, a refectory, and administrative offices. The project also transformed the surrounding area into a public square featuring a new hotel, office space, and a transport interchange, linking the historic cathedral buildings to the modern town centre. Funded through a partnership between the cathedral, local government, and community donations, the expansion included the Temple Gallery, a glass corridor named in honour of Archbishop William Temple.

The cathedral continues to form an important part of the diocesan and town community. It is open to visitors and has a café in the crypt, as well as hosting numerous religious and secular events. In 2021, the crypt of the cathedral was used as a major public vaccination centre during the COVID-19 pandemic.

== Internal fixtures and fittings ==
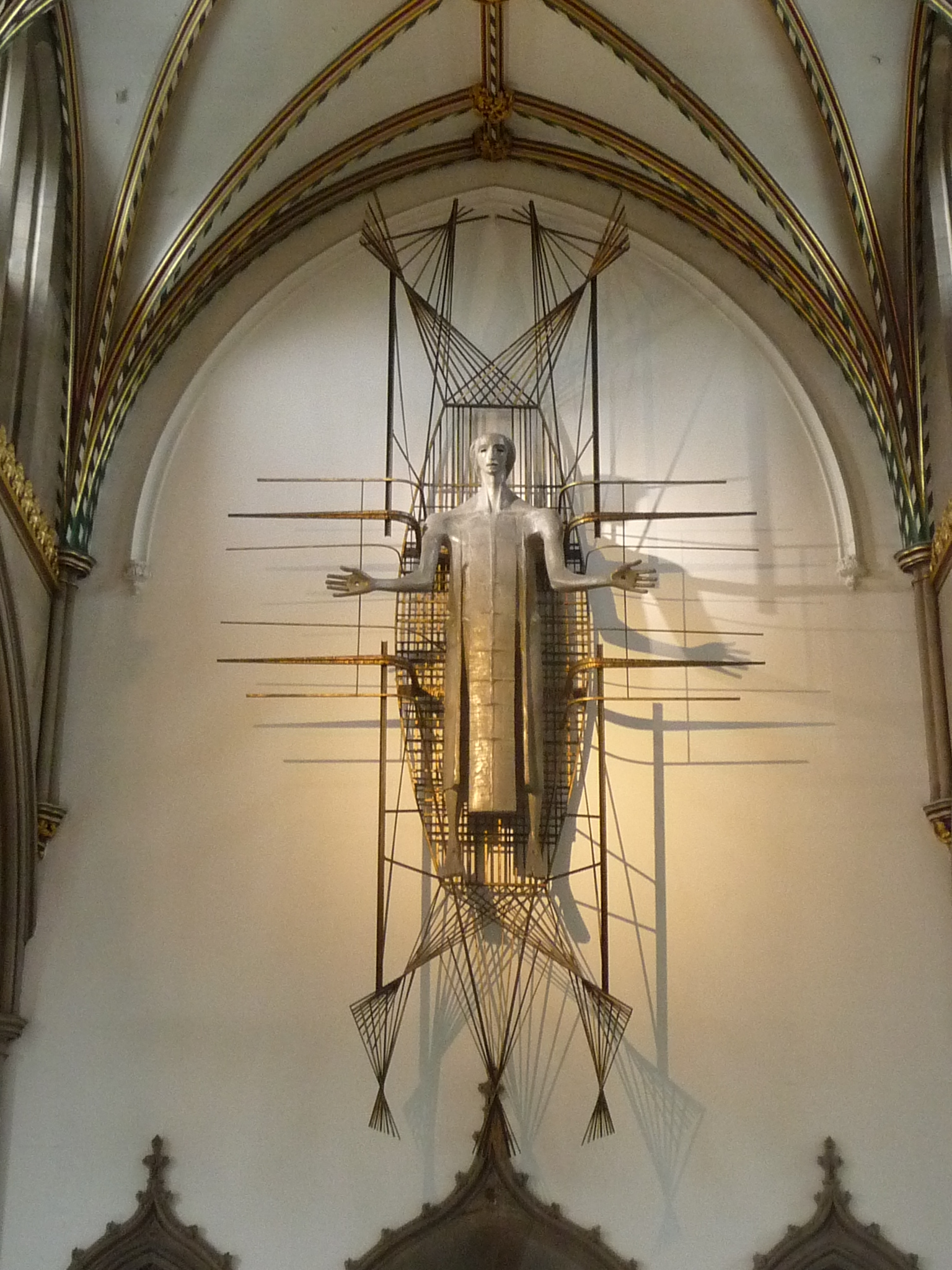
Christ the Worker sculpture by John Hayward

The cathedral is noted for its bright and spacious interior, largely unencumbered by the accretions of centuries of patronage that can be seen in many English cathedrals and churches. This was a deliberate conceit of architect Laurence King and the artist John Hayward; by 1926, Palmer's church had been embellished with many monuments, a large collection of stained glass, pews and other liturgical furniture, all of which were removed at the beginning of the enlargement, with only a small number of examples reinstated, mostly moved into the transepts.

It was on King's recommendation that Hayward was engaged as effective artist-in-residence to the cathedral, either in 1961 or 1962. They would work together on the fixtures and fittings for the building into the mid-1970s. King and Hayward had met at Faith Craft and, while Hayward had since established an independent studio, at the time that King was awarded the Blackburn commission, they were both also engaged on the reconstruction of St Mary-le-Bow. Despite the loss of his stained glass for the lantern tower when it was rebuilt in the 1990s, Hayward's work can still be seen throughout the cathedral.

For the sanctuary, Hayward designed the oak cathedra and choir stalls, the four gilded sculptures of winged seraphim in the pendentives, the large sculptural Corona in bronze and steel that hangs above the altar, and the Portland stone altar itself. Hayward was also responsible for the large fibreglass and aluminum sculpture of Christ the Worker that dominates the west wall of the nave. At its centre is the figure of the Risen Christ, arms outstretched and wearing a worker's scapular. Christ appears to be mounted in a mandorla that closely resembles a cotton loom, an intended allusion to Lancashire's textile manufacturing heritage.

Further works by Hayward can be found throughout the building. At the centre of the south transept stands Hayward's egg-shaped baptismal font, sculpted from stone and topped by a bronze cover with figures of Christ and John the Baptist. On the altar wall of the Jesus Chapel is a painted icon showing the Risen Christ emerging from the cloth that bound his body in the tomb. Hayward also designed the etched glass screen that divides the Jesus Chapel from the Chapel of St Martin of Tours. It depicts three soldier saints, Martin, Michael and George, reflecting the military dedication of the St Martin chapel. For the stained glass window inside that chapel, Hayward created an abstract design in green and yellow said to be in imitation of camouflage. A statue of St Martin by Yves le Pape, a gift of the Tours Cathedral, is also kept here.

In the south transept, Hayward's glazing scheme for the large south window, depicting the Tree of Life set against a cross, is composed of many hundreds of glass fragments of 19th century glass taken from the thirty windows that were removed from 19th century church during enlargement works. Rather than reinstall these, King wanted the nave to be filled with the natural light through clear glazing. Nevertheless, the decision to break up the glass was controversial in particular due to the loss of a late 19th century window in Arts and Crafts-style that had been made for the church by Edward Burne-Jones and depicted Faith, Hope and Charity. It survives now only in fragmentary form within Hayward's new window.

A second window by Burne-Jones, depicting Enoch, Paul and Elijah, did survive and is now among the few 19th century windows to remain in the cathedral, reinstalled in the ambulatory. The other significant survivor is the glass in the north window of the north transept. Originally made for a convent in modern-day Belgium in the 18th century, the glass was bought to Blackburn in 1849 and installed in the east window of the church, which was demolished during the first phase of expansion in the 1930s. Across the five lights, the reset glass shows Christ to the centre flanked by the four Evangelists.

Also in the north transept is Advent Hunstone's original cathedra, part of the furniture he was commissioned to make for the cathedral under Forsyth's original plan. It was later replaced by that of Hayward's design, which can be seen in the sanctuary. In its new position, Hunstone's seat is flanked by eight medieval choir stalls that have misericords that once belonged to a set made for Whalley Abbey in the 15th century. Three of the misericord carvings show symbols of the Evangelists - the Angel of St Matthew, the Lion of St Mark, and the winged Ox of St Luke (the eagle of St John is not present). The five remaining misericords depict the Garden of Eden, a fox preaching to geese, a hunting scene, and two with leaf patterns.

Hunstone also designed the Gothic pulpit that stands nearby and the rood that hangs above the entrance to the Jesus Chapel. The pulpit, carved in oak, has figures of saints Peter, James, John the Evangelist, Mary, Andrew and John the Baptist. The painted rood is in four parts, with the crucified Jesus to the centre, flanked by Mary and John the Evangelist. Above is a carved architectural canopy. Its current configuration was determined by King and Hayward.

In the north east nave is a sculpture of the Virgin and Child by Josefina de Vasconcellos. It was installed in the cathedral in 1974 in memory of Helen Dix. It is cast in 'terrossa' a terracotta-coloured metal frequently used by the artist.

In 2005, 15 paintings by the artist Penny Warden were installed around the cathedral. Entitled 'The Journey' they function as Stations of the Cross and are designed to be contemplated in devotional procession around the building.

== Treasury ==
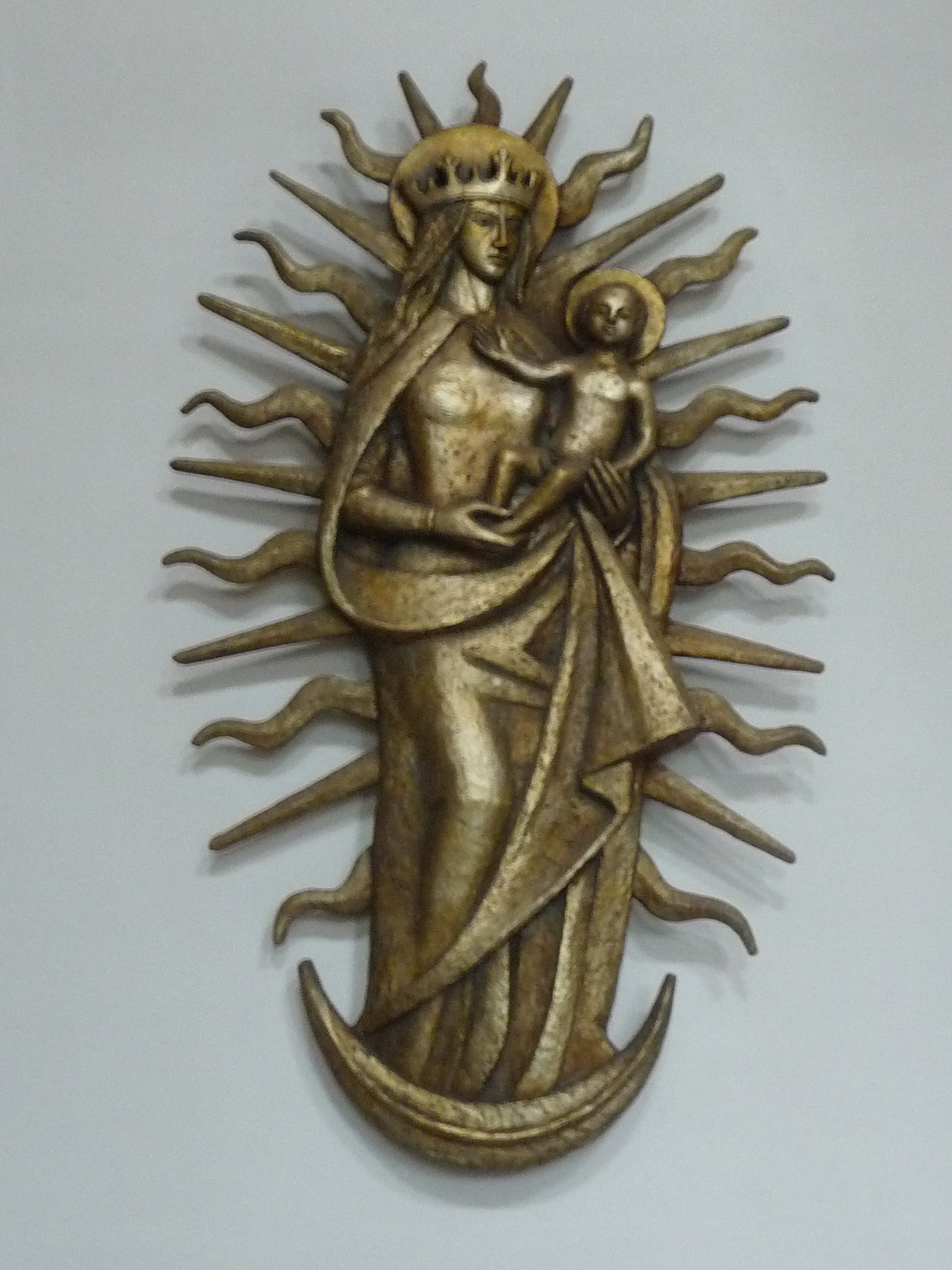
Sculpture based on the Blackburn Pax

The most ancient of the cathedral's treasures is a hammerhead that was discovered in the River Ribble. While tradition holds that the hammer is of Saxon origin, modern dating suggests it is much older and probably originated during the Bronze Age. Since the creation of the diocese, the hammer, now attached to a modern wood shaft, is traditionally used by an incoming Bishop of Blackburn to knock on the door of the cathedral when they arrived for their investiture.

Another early treasure is the hand-held 15th century Pax that was rediscovered in 1820 when the medieval church was being demolished. Made from latten, this small devotional icon would have been used during priestly rituals. Once common, most were destroyed during the Reformation, making this a rare surviving example. It is not normally on display, but an enlarged reproduction of the central image of the Virgin and Child hangs in the south transept of the cathedral.

== Dean and chapter ==
As of April 2026:

- Dean — The Very Revd Peter Howell-Jones
- Canon Missioner — James Lawrence
- Canon Precentor — Jennifer Gaffin

== Music ==
The organist and director of music is John Robinson and the organist in residence is John Hosking.

=== Choir ===
The cathedral choirs — Cathedral Choir of Boys, Girls and Men, Youth Choir - formally Young Peoples' Choir, Blackburn Chamber Choir, formally Renaissance Singers/the Bach Choir and St Paul’s Singers. On Sundays the parish communion is sung by the YPC and the Eucharist and Evensong by the cathedral choir.

=== Organ ===
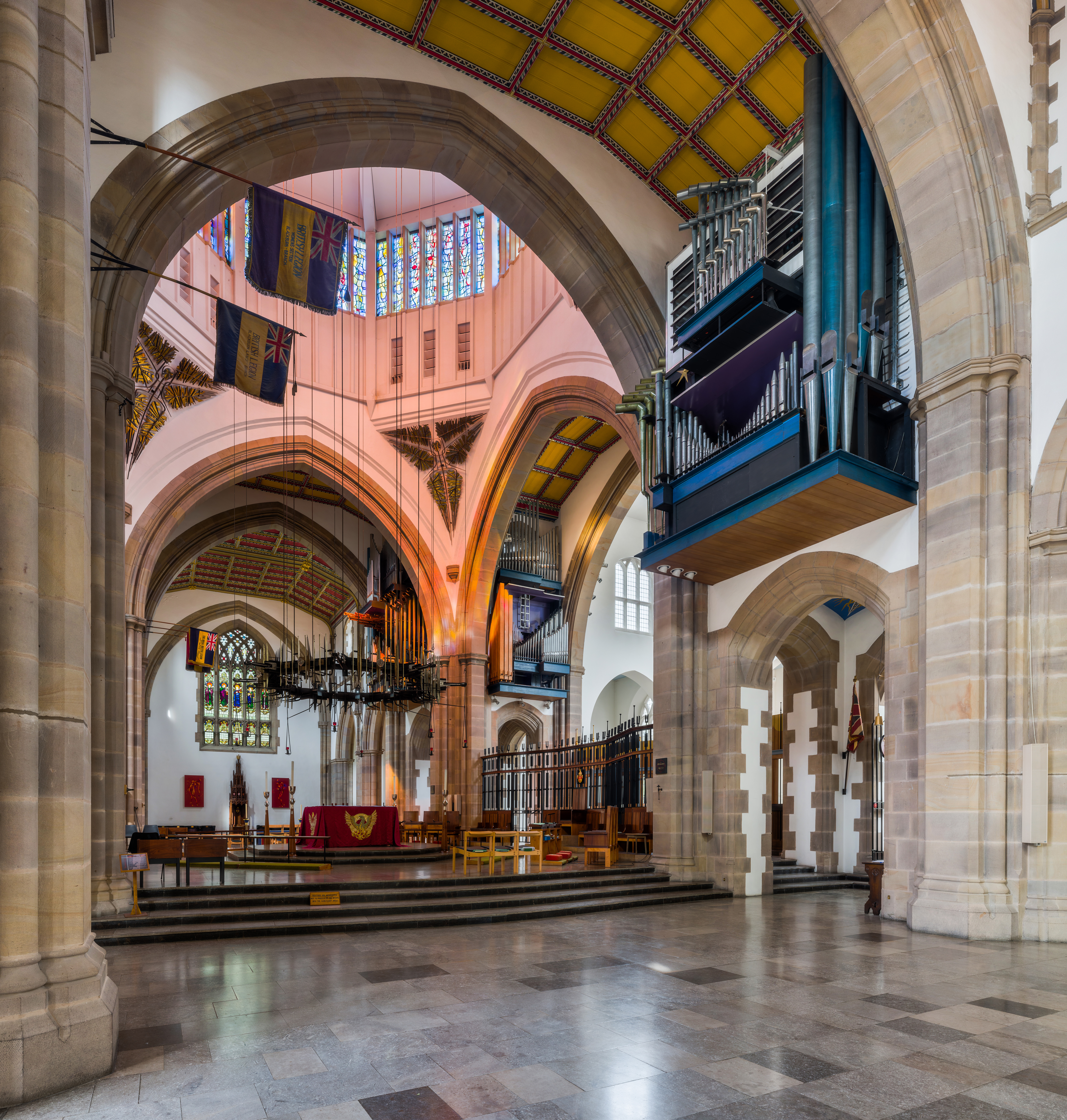
View of Transept and Sanctuary, showing the organ

The organ for the new church was designed by John Gray and Frederick Davison. Its debut was on 28 February 1828, with a concert of works by Handel including extracts from Messiah, Israel in Egypt and his Occasional Overture, played by the new organist Joseph John Harris. This organ was replaced in the 1870s by an instrument designed by Aristide Cavaillé-Coll.

The third, and present organ at Blackburn was built by J. W. Walker & Sons Ltd and completed in 1970. Funding was provided by William Thompson, a Burnley-based benefactor of the cathedral. The organ was restored at the end of the 20th century by Woods. It is considered a world-class instrument, and is used for recordings, concerts, recitals and organ meditations throughout the year.

=== Organists ===
Since 2019 the organist and director of music has been John Robinson. Previous organists have included Henry Smart, Richard Henry Coleman, Charles Hylton Stewart, Herman Brearley, Thomas Lucas Duerden, John Bertalot, David Anthony Cooper, Gordon Stewart, Richard Tanner and Samuel Hudson. The organist in residence (since 2022) is John Hosking.

=== Bells ===
The first mention of bells in the old parish church was in 1552 when the vicar and churchwardens purchased five bells from the Royal Commissioners for £26-12-1. A new peal of six bells was cast in 1737 from the metal of the existing bells and it was this ring of six that was moved over to the west tower of the new church in 1832. Four bells were added during 1851–52 to form a ring of ten.

In 1949, while extension work was being carried out in the cathedral, the current ring of ten bells was installed. All ten bells were cast by John Taylor & Co. of Loughborough. The tenor bell weighs 25-1-14 (1,289 kg) is tuned to D and has a diameter of 52 inches (1.32 metres).

== Gallery ==
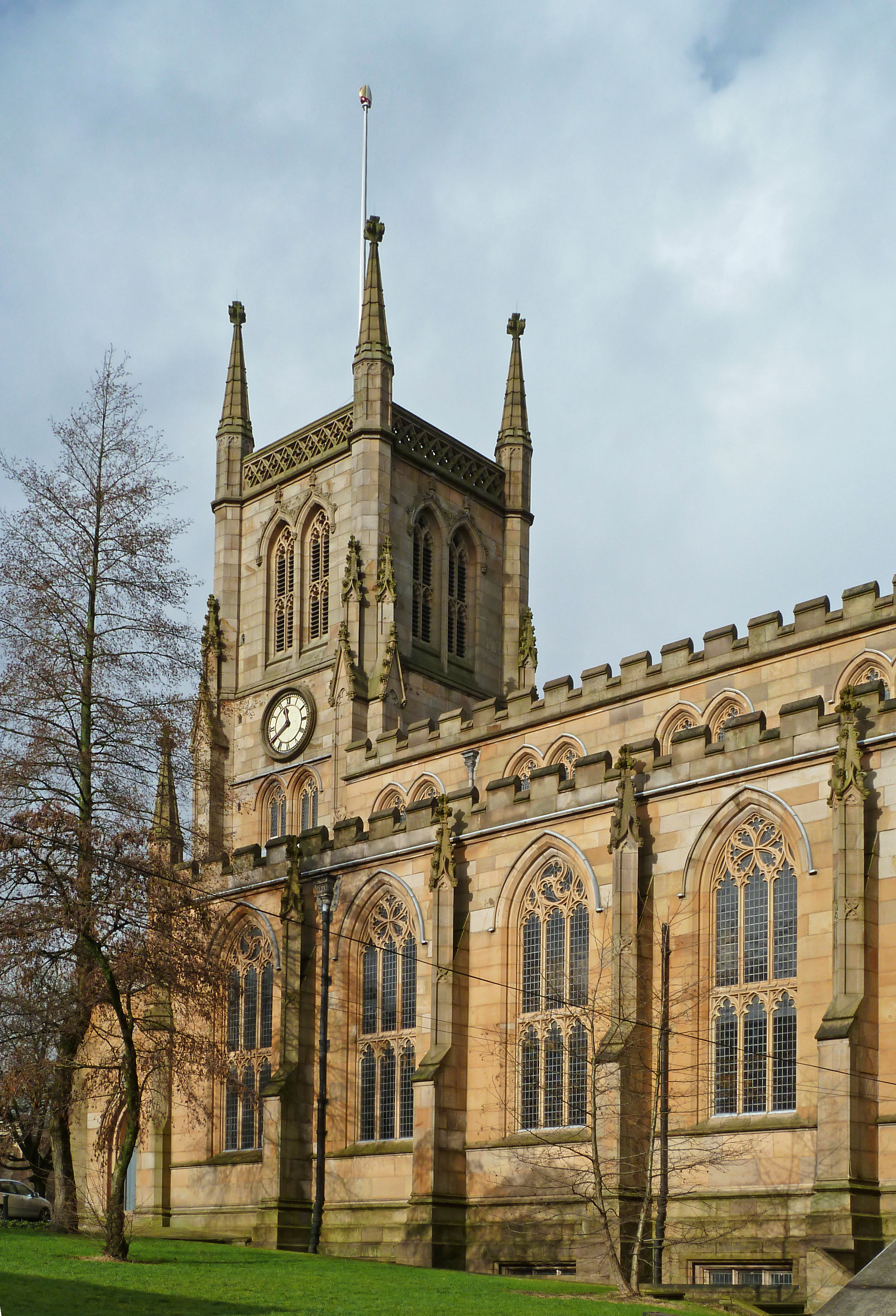
West tower

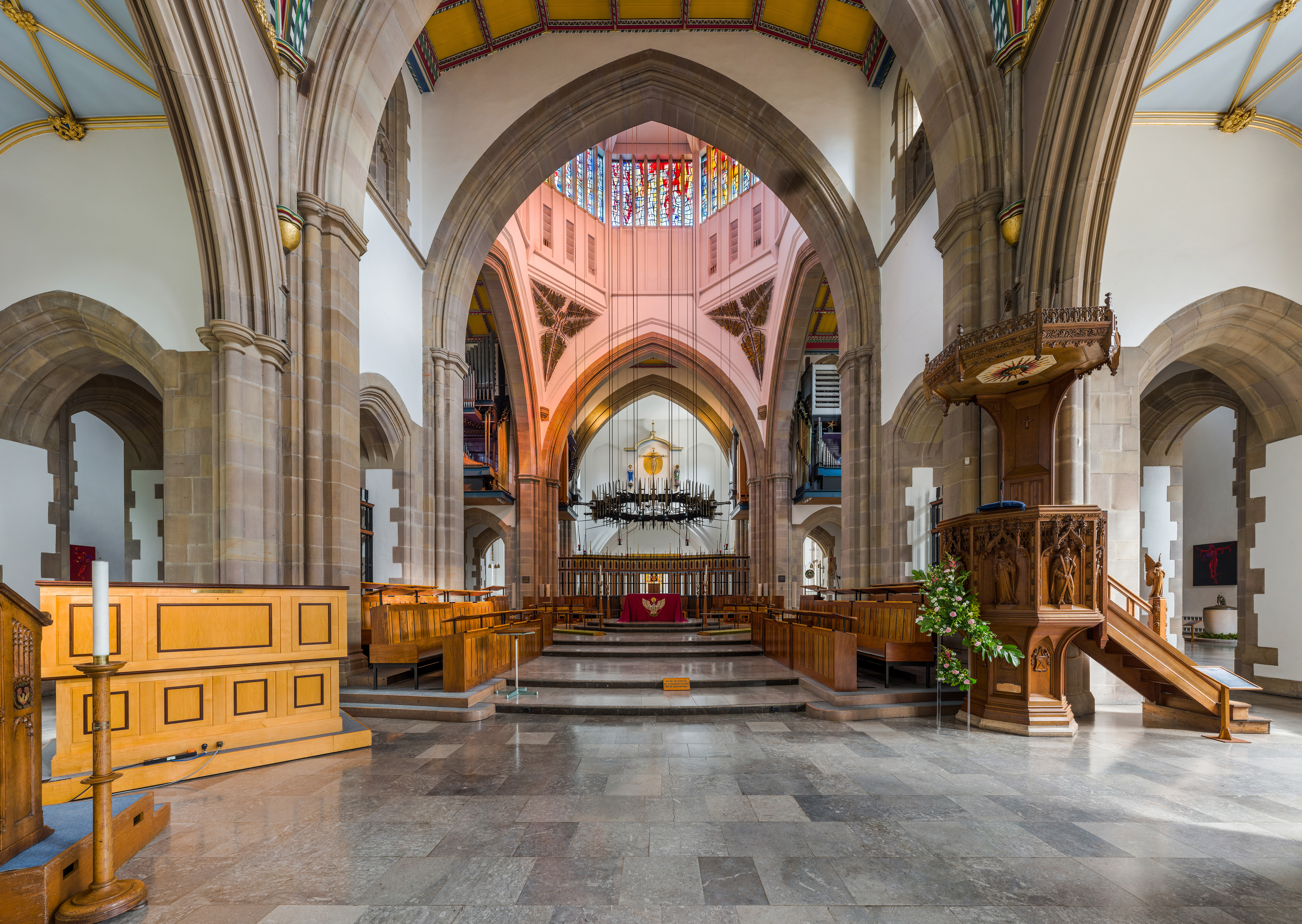
Sanctuary

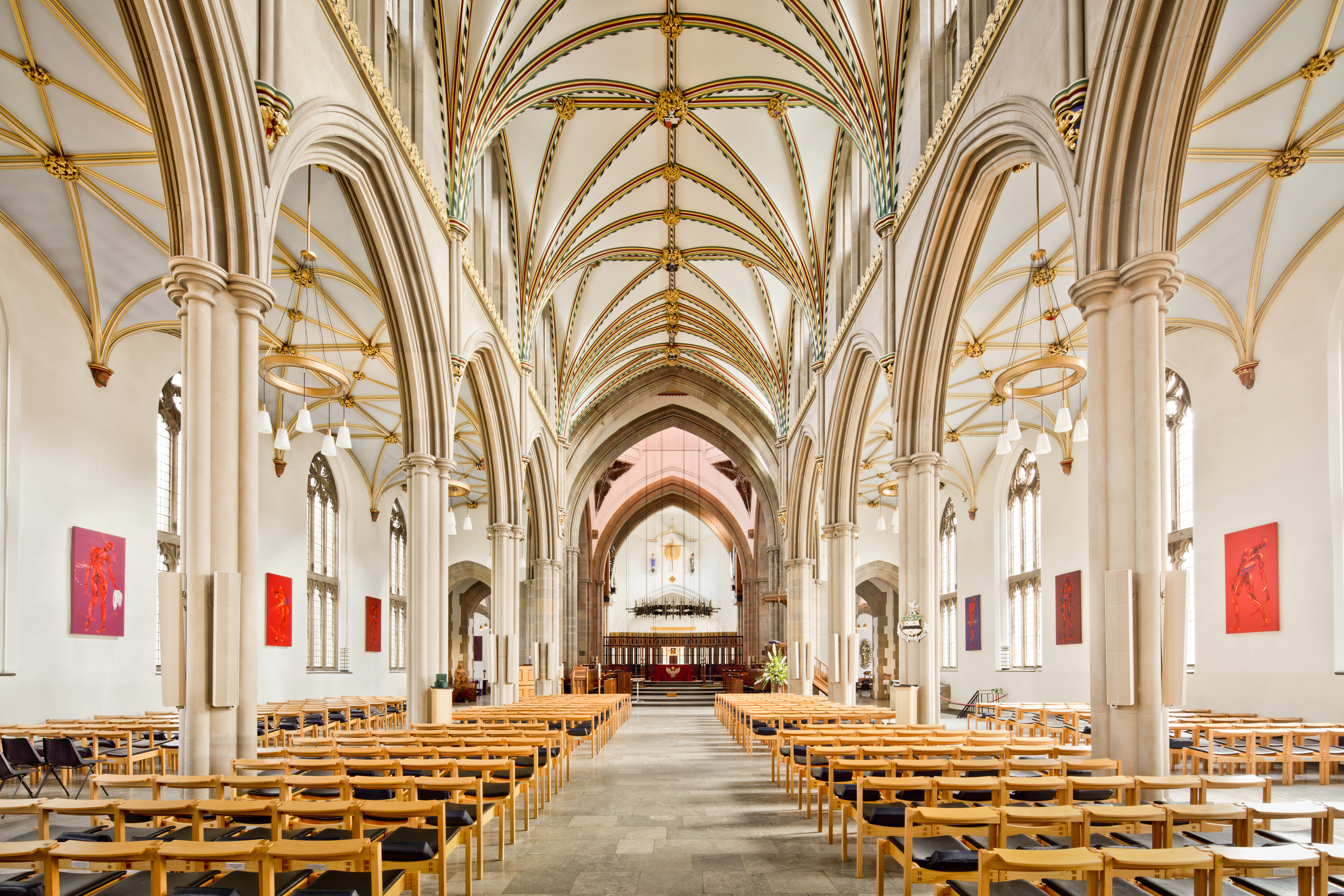
Nave, looking east

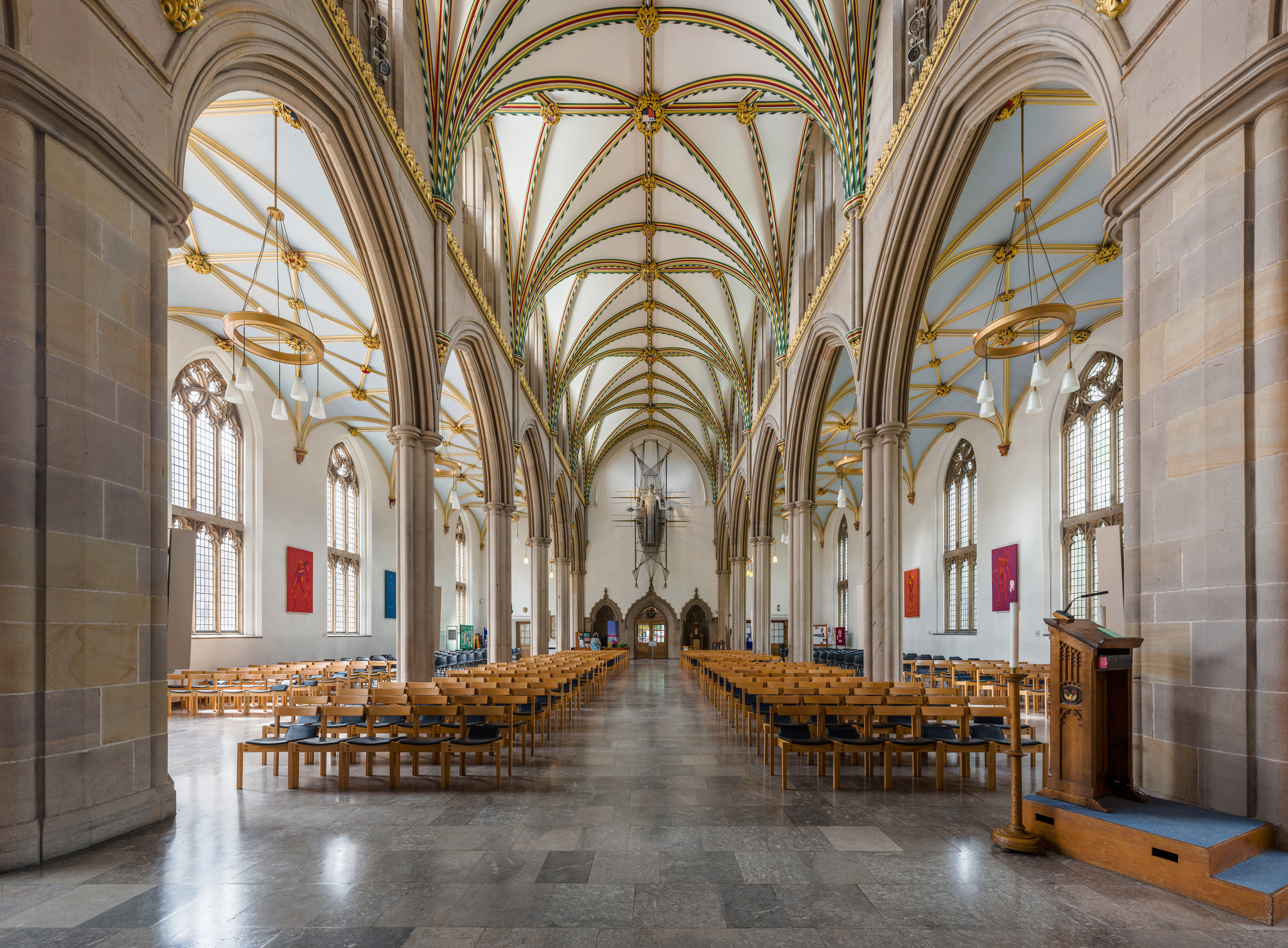
Nave, looking west

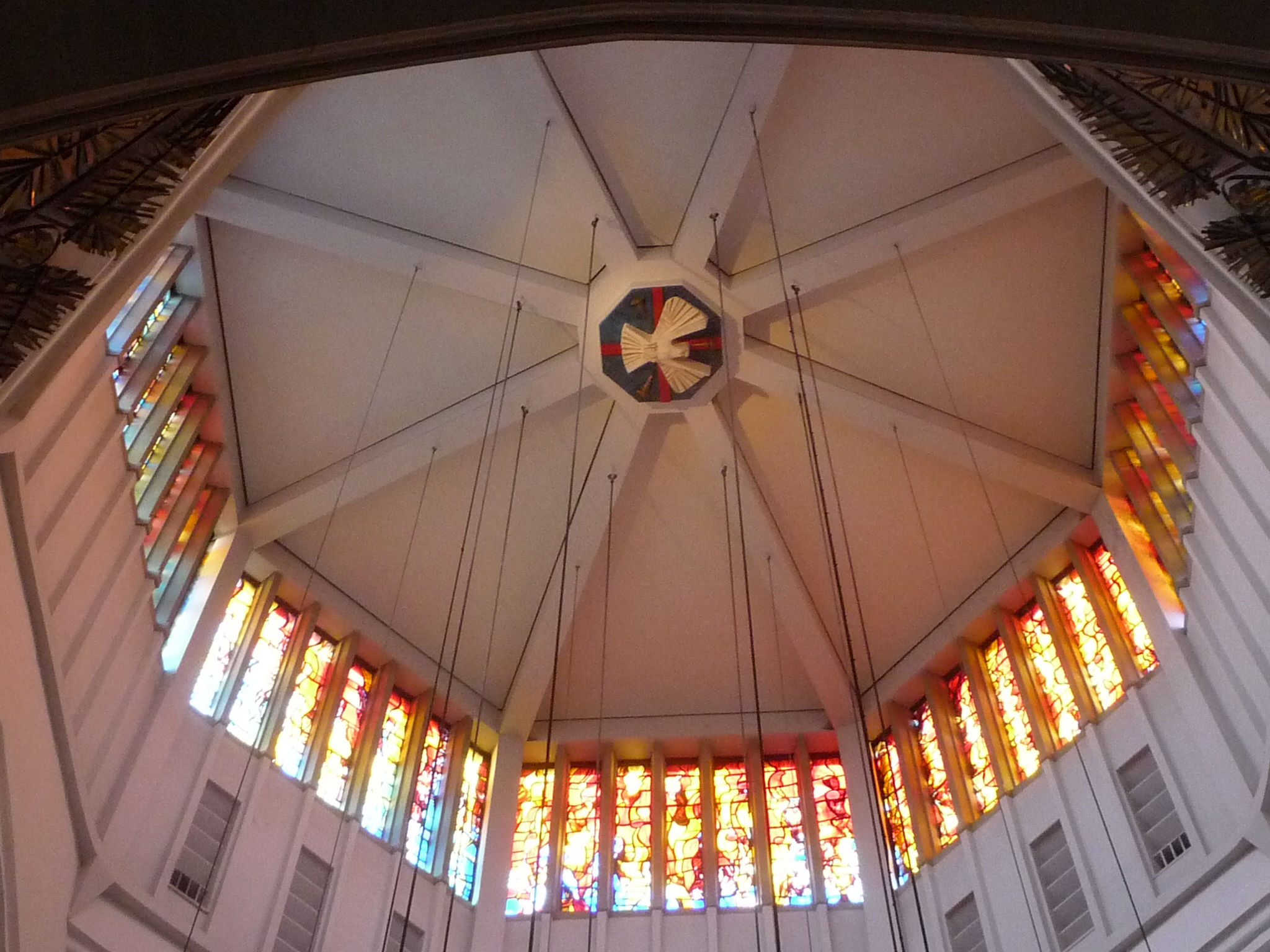
Interior view of the lantern

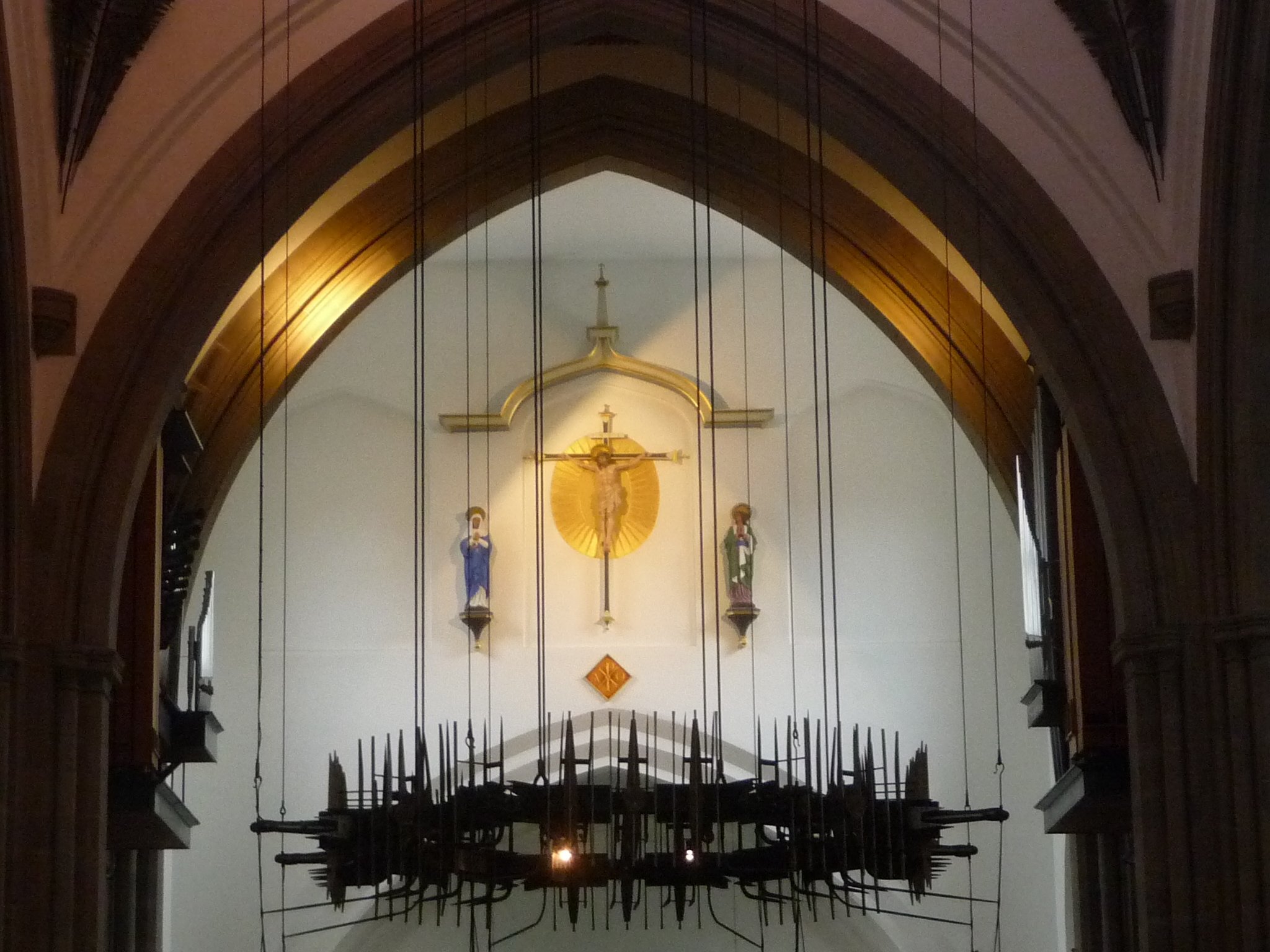
East end: Rood by Advent Hunstone, seen beyond the hanging corona by John Hayward

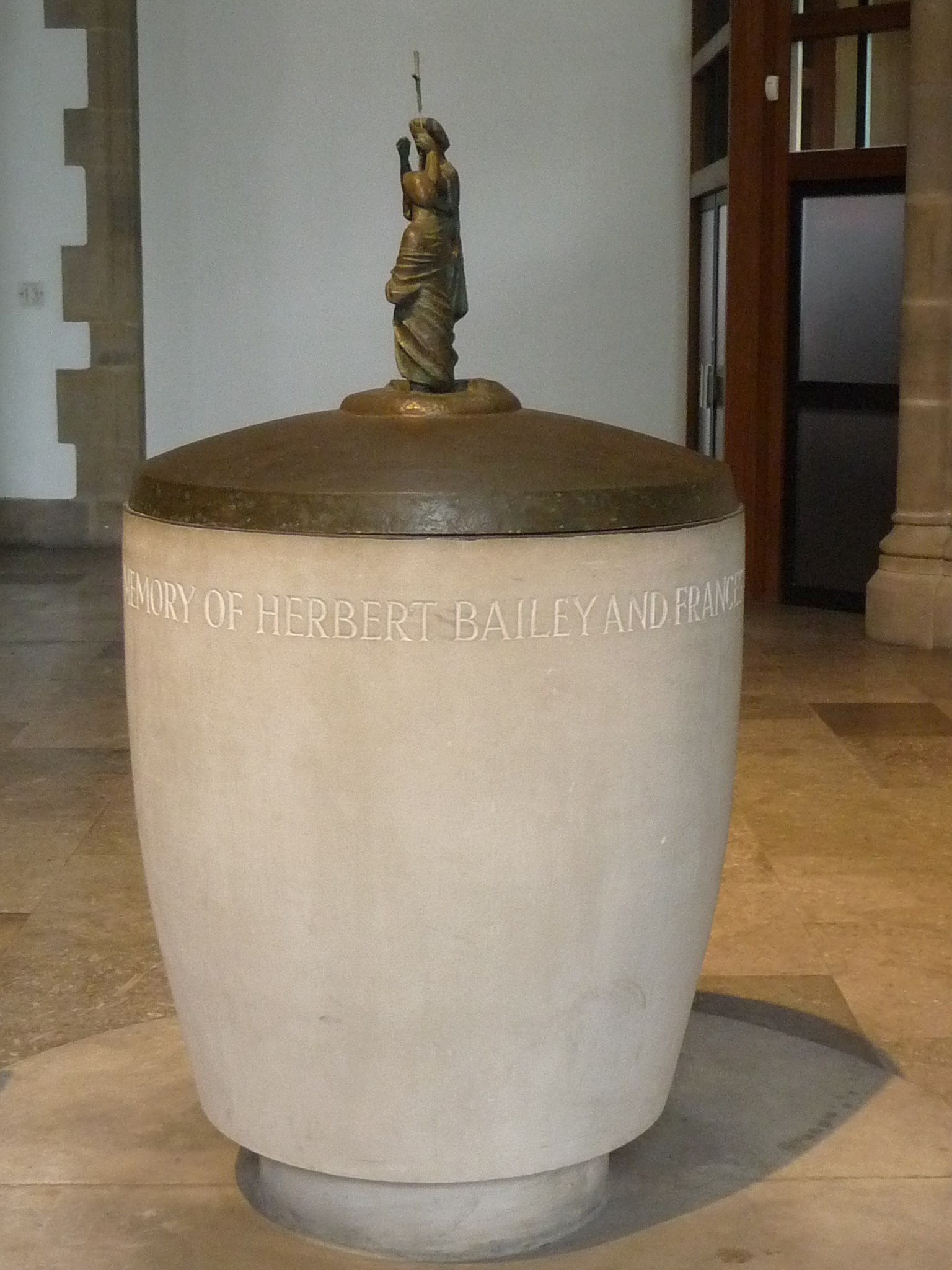
The font

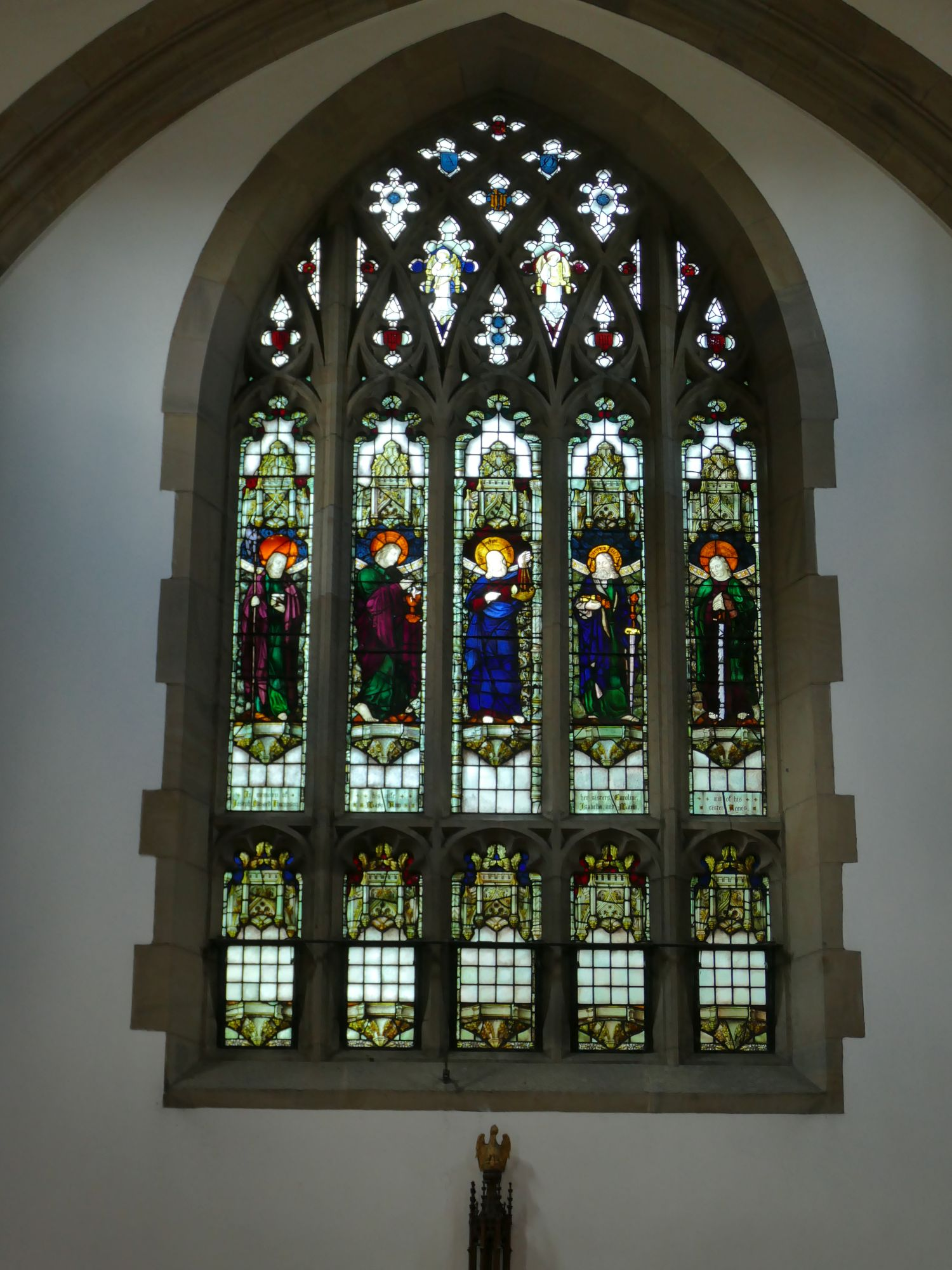
North transept window

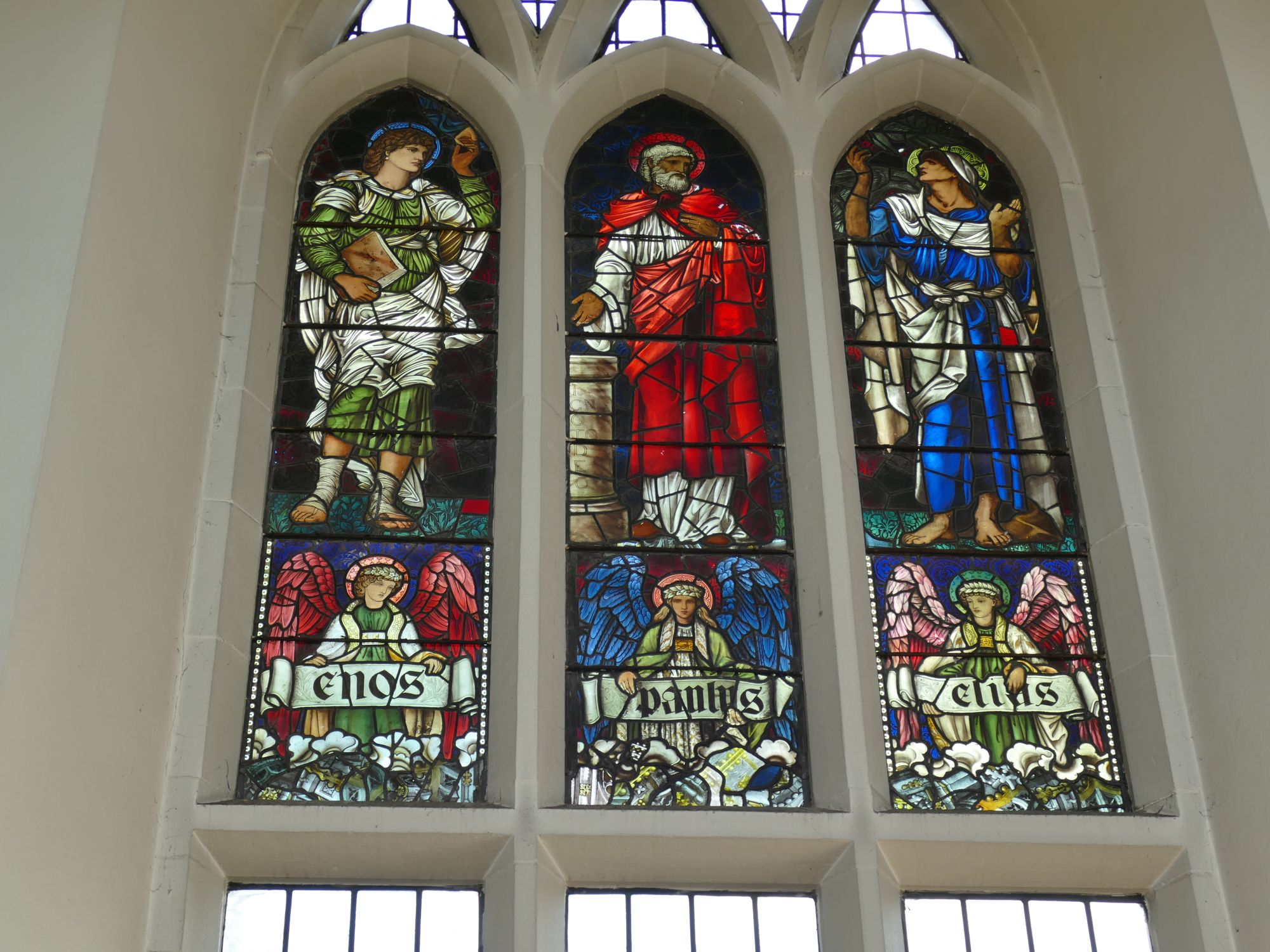
The surviving Burne-Jones window

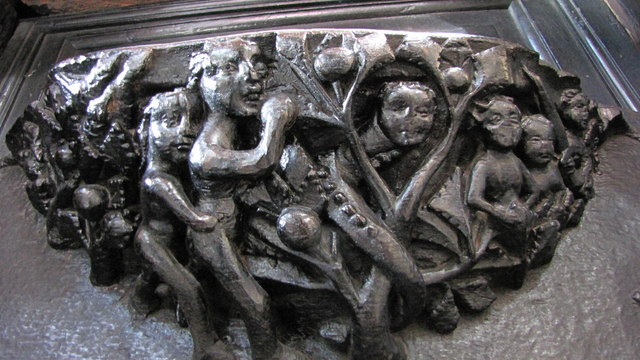
15th-century misericord depicting the Garden of Eden

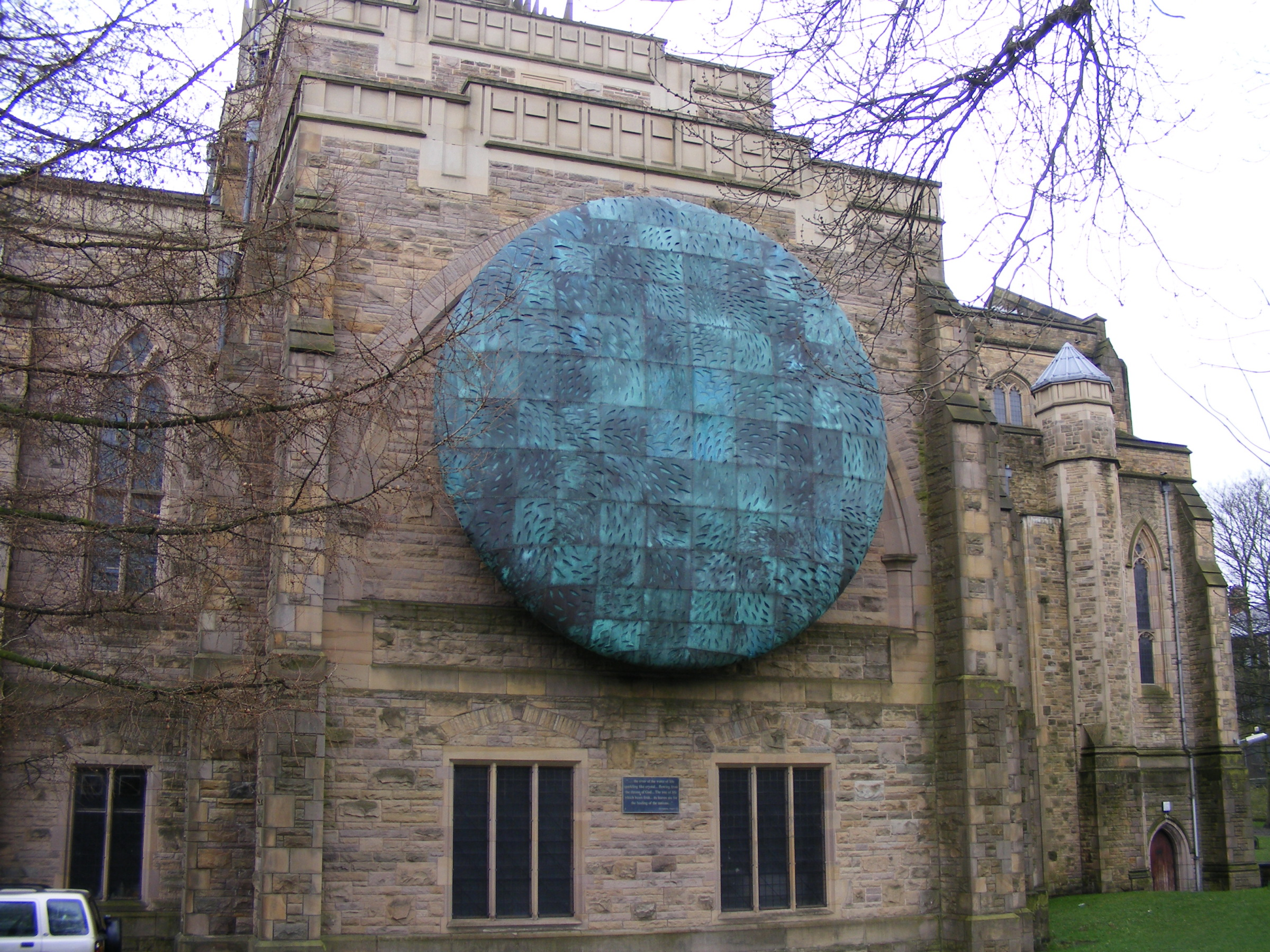
The Healing of The Nations sculpture by Mark Jalland

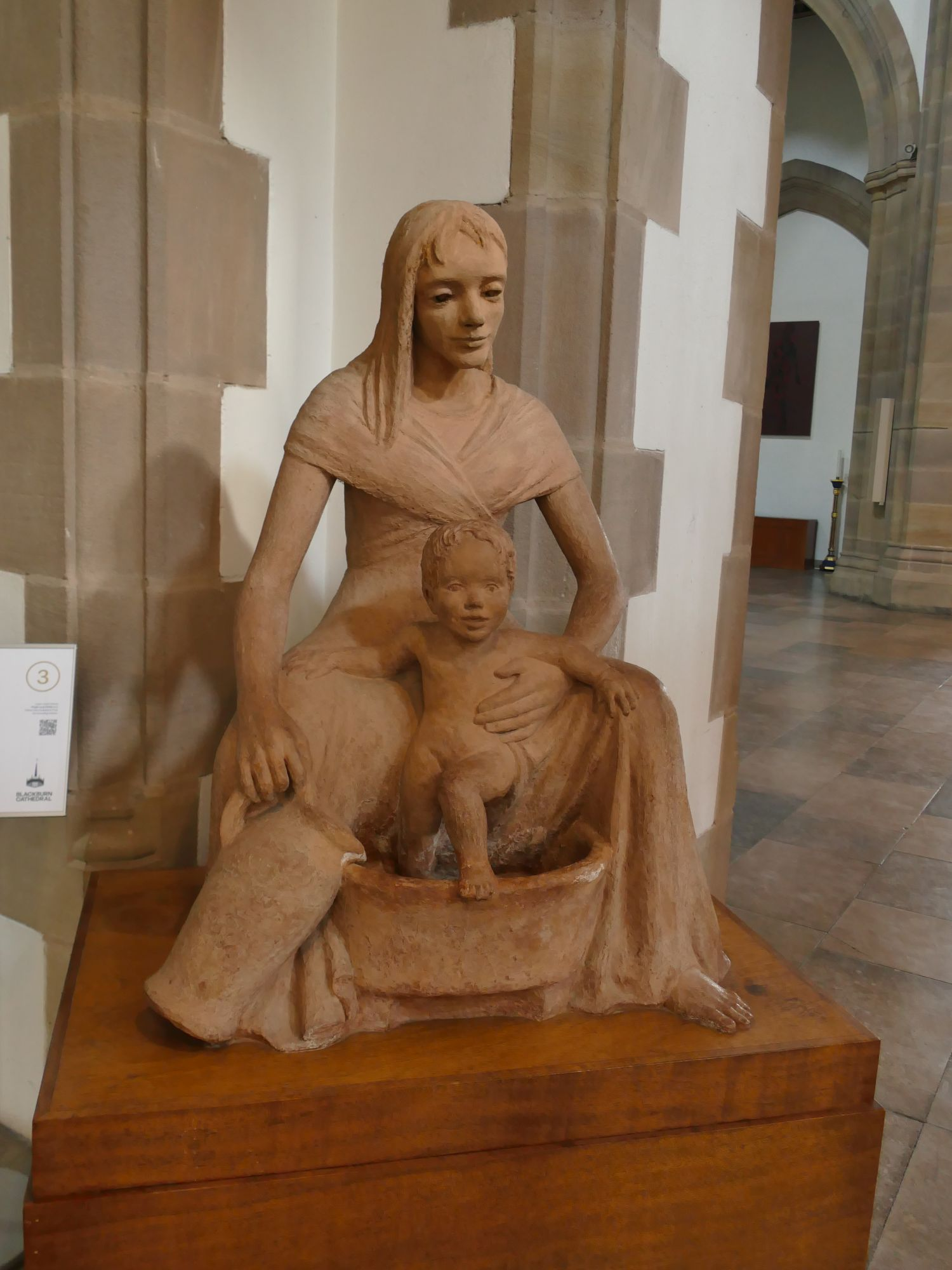
Virgin and Child sculpture by Josefina de Vasconcellos

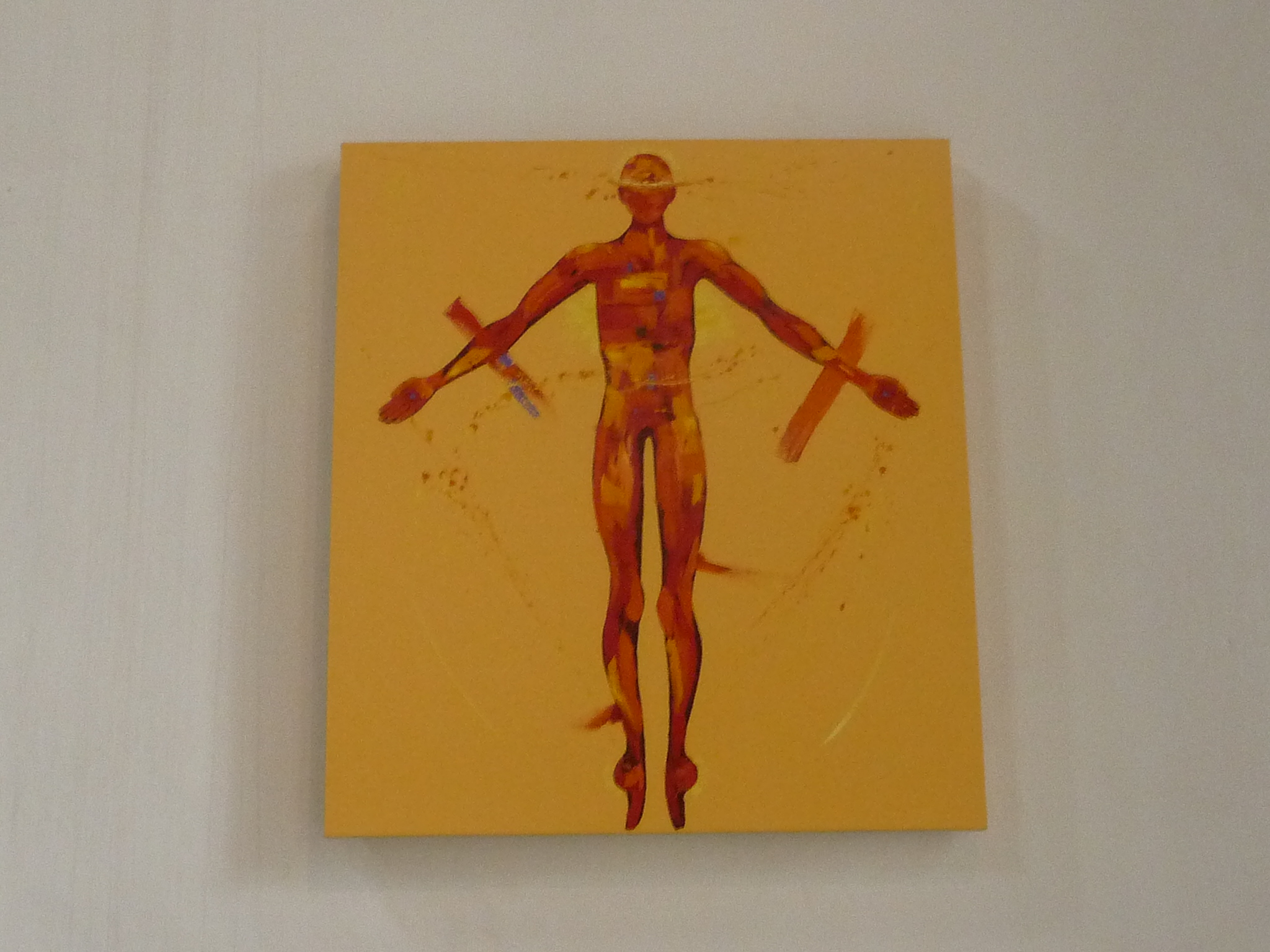
One of fifteen paintings in a series by Penny Warden

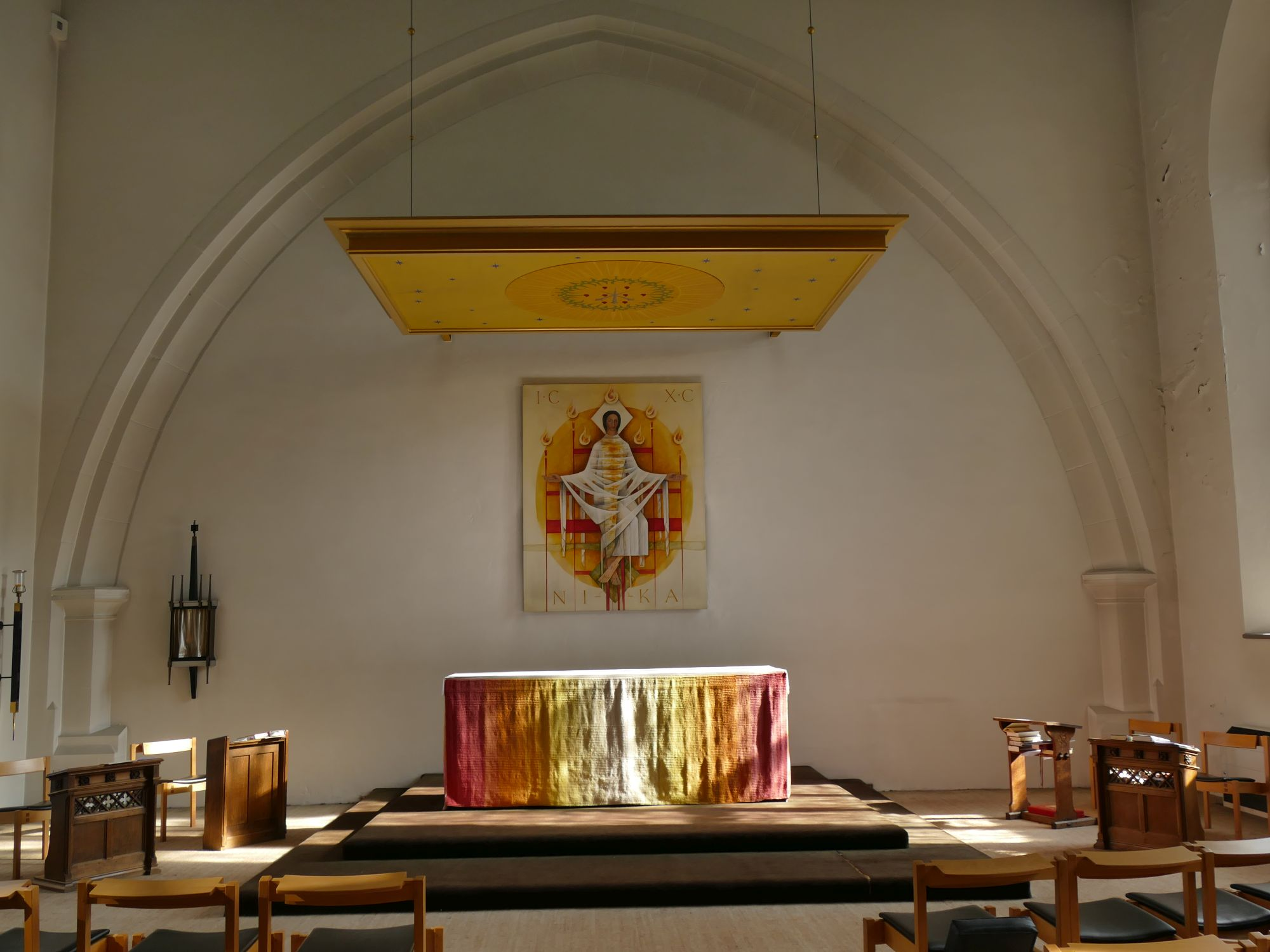
Jesus Chapel

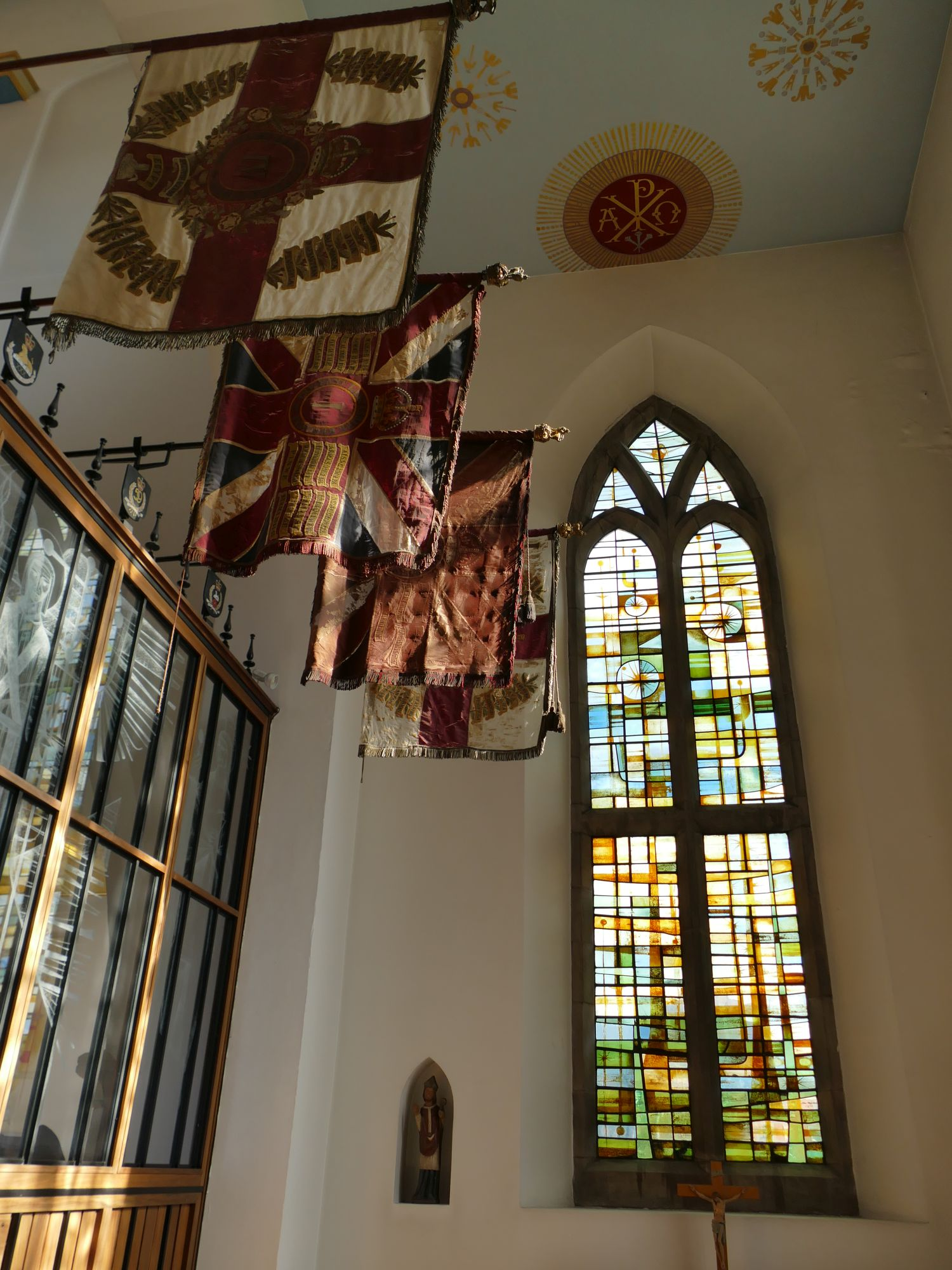
The Chapel of St Martin of Tours

== See also ==
- Listed buildings in Blackburn
