= St Lawrence's Church, York =

Listed church in York, England

Coordinates: 53.953810°N 1.068839°W

St Lawrence Parish Church
- The church in 2024
- St Lawrence Parish Church
- OS grid reference: SE 61203 51258
- Denomination: Church of England
- Churchmanship: Traditional Anglo-Catholic/Prayer Book Catholic
- Website: stlawrenceparishchurch.org.uk

History
- Status: Parish church
- Dedication: St Lawrence
- Consecrated: Churchyard 12th century or earlier – new building consecrated 1883

Architecture
- Functional status: Active
- Heritage designation: Grade II listed (with Grade I-listed tower and scheduled monuments in churchyard)
- Designated: Grade I: 14 June 1954, Grade II: 24 June 1983, Scheduled monument: 24 April 2002

Administration
- Province: Province of York
- Diocese: Diocese of York
- Archdeaconry: Archdeaconry of York
- Deanery: York Deanery
- Parish: St Lawrence with St Nicholas, York

Clergy
- Bishop(s): Rt. Rev. Stephen Race, Bishop of Beverley (AEO)
- Vicar(s): Rev'd Dr. Michael Brydon, SSC

St Lawrence Parish Church is an active Church of England parish church in York, England. It stands on Lawrence Street, just outside Walmgate Bar. It is known for its use of the Book of Common Prayer and sits within the Anglo-Catholic tradition of the Church of England.

== History ==
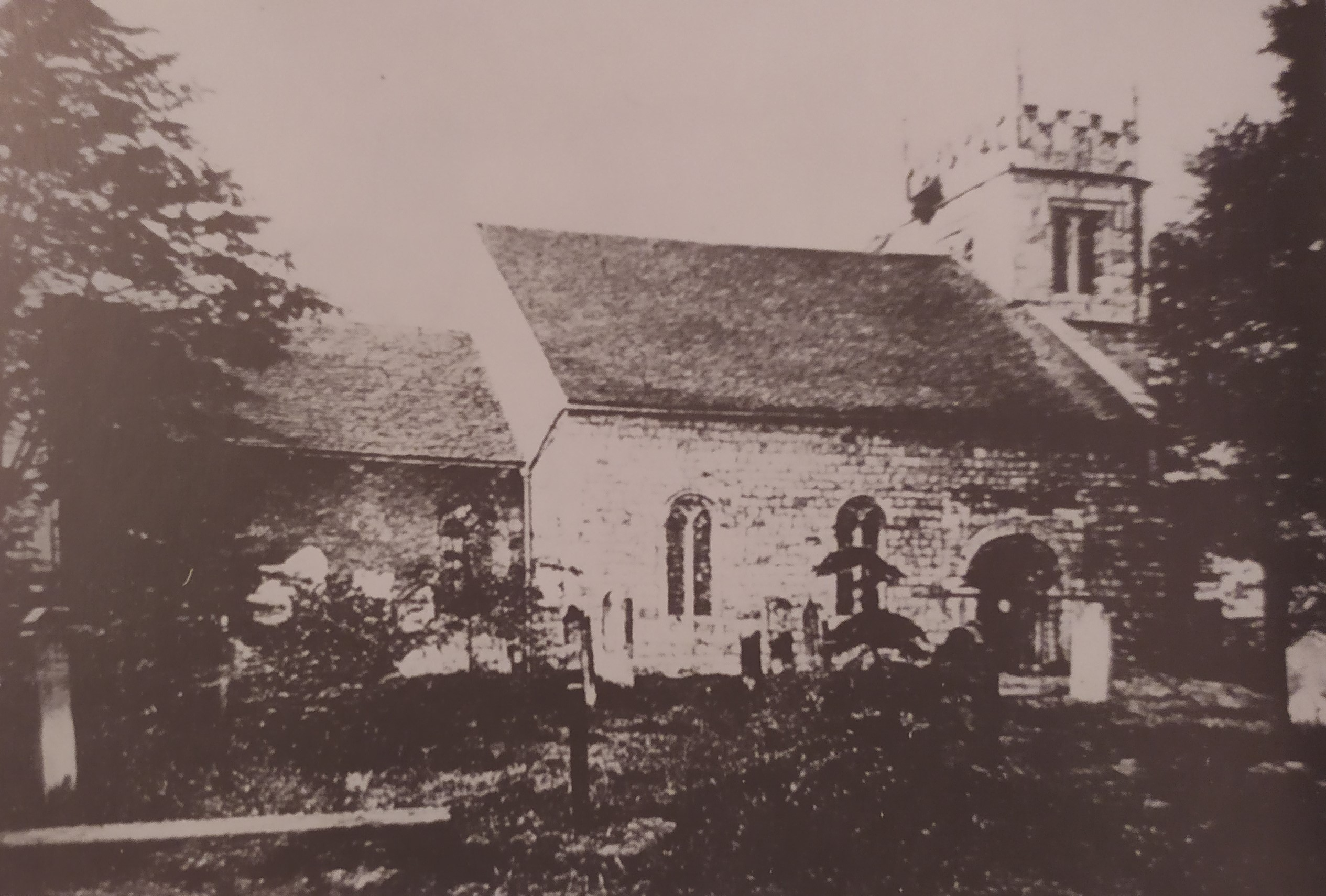
The church before demolition

It is dedicated to St Lawrence, possibly in deliberate reference to the Basilica of Saint Lawrence outside the Walls, in Rome. The tower of the old church building remains in the churchyard – the doorway and lower half date to the 12th century. This tower is now cared for by the Churches Conservation Trust. The oldest gravestones in the churchyard lie on the site of the demolished nave and chancel and include tombs of the Heskeths and Yarburghs of Heslington Hall.

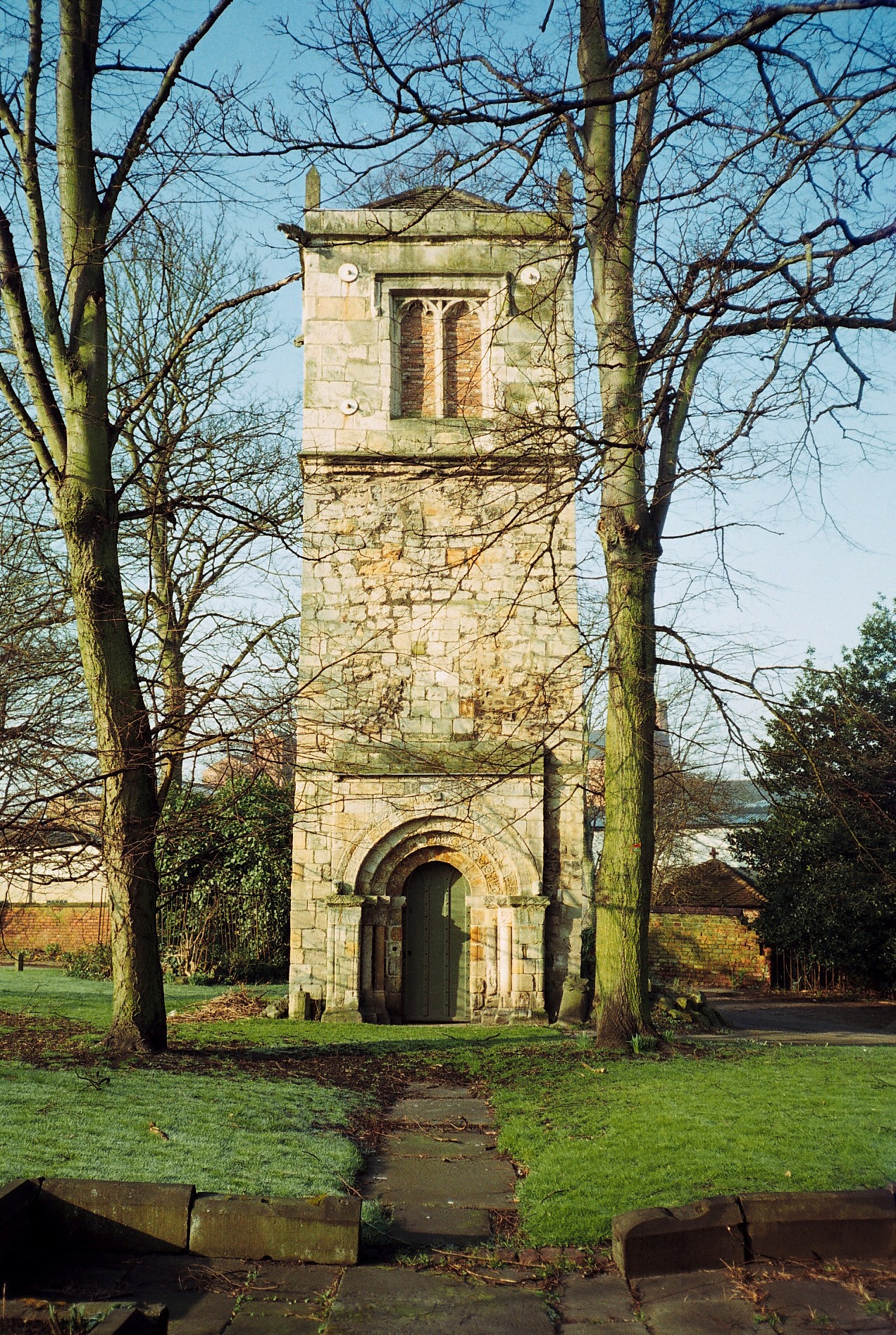
The Old Tower

The parish was united with that of St Nicholas after that church was destroyed in the Siege of York. St Lawrence was also severely damaged, but was rebuilt at the Restoration, and silver and furniture from around 1669 remain. Sir John Vanbrugh married Henrietta Maria Yarburgh here on a snowy day in 1719. The churchyard contains the 1830 Rigg Memorial – built by public subscription for six children who died in a boating accident, with an epitaph by James Montgomery – and the 1820 'medicine pot' memorial to Dr Oswald Allen (who ran the York Dispensary charity) and his wife. These monuments, together with the tower, are Grade I listed.

The old church was demolished between 1881 and 1883 to build a much larger building, the second-largest religious building in York after York Minster. It is the leading work of J. B. Hall of Canterbury. The first incumbent was Robert Crosthwaite, who would later be appointed as inaugural Bishop of Beverley, and to whom a memorial plaque may be found in the church's sanctuary.

The spire was added from 1891 to 1893, with an illuminated clock given in memory of his parents by Alderman Robert Fawcett. The church contains the elaborate font from about 1400, moved from the old church. Much of the stained glass was produced by the Knowles family of Stonegate, including the recently restored east window. There is a very unusual and large art deco First World War memorial window depicting the Somme battlefield, the city of York, and a knight and grail cup, designed in 1929 by Joan Fulleylove. The chancel area was remodelled by Robert 'Mousey' Thompson of Kilburn as a Second World War memorial. The church has otherwise been little altered.

The tower of the old church is designated as a Grade I listed building, and as part of a scheduled monument which includes the buried remains of the medieval church and majority of its burial ground. The 19th-century church is Grade II listed.

=== Bells ===
The church was given a set of eight bells hung for change ringing in 1999, by the bellringers of York, to mark the millennium. They were all cast (in 1947, 1988, and 1999 respectively), and hung together, by John Taylor & Co, of Loughborough. These are rung by the St Lawrence Society of Change Ringers. Four of the bells formerly hung in Charrington's Brewery, London. The bells were all 'christened' on Easter Day of 1999 after the historic dedications of religious houses within the modern parish: (treble-tenor) St Helen, St Edward the Confessor, St Andrew, All Hallows, St Catherine, St Michael, St Nicholas, St Laurence.

== St Lawrence today ==
The church has a large community hall, built in 1935 on the former site of a line of cottages belonging to the Vicars Choral of York Minster.

In early 2014, the east window of the church was severely damaged in high winds. The window has since been restored.

St Lawrence made online and print news in 2014 due to wide online circulation of a video of the Trololo song being performed there as part of a University of York Brass Band Society concert.

In the last few years the parish church has seen fresh rejuvenation. In 2020 a large organ which had previously been in St Michael-le-Belfrey church, central York, was moved to St Lawrence's. The church hall has been fully refurbished. In 2016 the Rigg Memorial was restored by York Civic Trust and was dedicated by the Archbishop of York on 11 March 2017. During 2016 and 2017 the church underwent a major building project which included the installation of a new heating system, significant re-wiring and lighting costing in excess of £200,000. In conjunction with the York Civic Trust the Vicar and Churchwardens are working on an extensive churchyard improvement project which will look to address parking, lighting, the footprint of the medieval church and the boundary walls. These improvements to the church and the excellent acoustics have led to an increased use of the building for concerts.

Since 2023, the York branch of CAMRA have held their annual York Beer Festival in the church every September, with great success. Before each festival begins, the beer is blessed by a local priest. 2024 marked the fiftieth year of the festival.

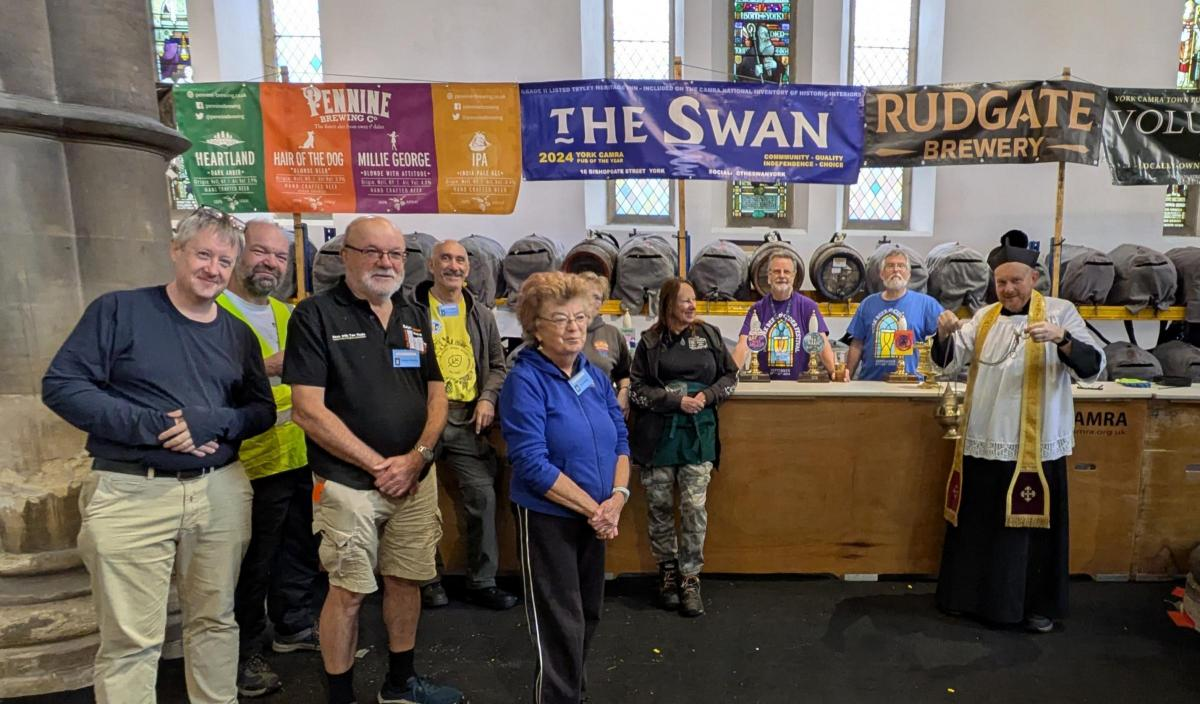
Fr. Geoff Mumford, Vicar of Copmanthorpe, blesses beer ahead of the 2025 CAMRA York Beer Festival held annually in the church

Recently, St Lawrence's have hosted a wide range of guest preachers at term-time solemn Evensong. January 2025 and 2026 both saw the Ebor Singers partake in Choral Evensong which was broadcast on BBC Radio 3.

The church is a member of The Society of St Wilfrid and St Hilda, and seeks episcopal and sacramental oversight from the Bishop of Beverley, Stephen Race.

The church has links with the York Normandy Veterans' group and Ken Cooke, the last surviving D-Day veteran from York. In 2021 installed a newly designed memorial window on the Western wall of the tower lanai, created by Helen Whittaker of Barley Studios.

On the 3rd of November 2026, Fr. Michael Brydon, former Chaplain to the Bishop of Sodor and Man, was licensed as Priest-in-Charge.

=== Services ===
St Lawrence's maintains a robed choir, altar servers and traditional ritual including incense and vestments during services. The church uses predominantly Book of Common Prayer rites: Mattins, a sung Mass, and Evensong which is choral during term time. It is one of only two York parish churches still to sing Evensong every Sunday.

=== Organs ===
The current organ at St Lawrence's was built by Denman and Co. in 1885 for the church of St Michael-le-Belfrey, next to York Minster. The three-manual organ is entirely mechanical with a highly decorative appearance. The powerful instrument is more suited to a church of the size of St Lawrence's than previous versions. It is on the National Pipe Organ Register.

Between 1907 and 2009, a two-manual Connacher organ from St Olave's Church, York was the main instrument in the church. By the 2000s, it was in a poor state of repair. It was moved to Lastingham parish church and restored. From 1883 when the current building was built, until the installation of the Connacher organ, a one-manual Postill organ from the mediaeval church was used.

== See also ==
- Listed buildings in York (outside the city walls, southern part)

== Notes ==
As three out of four Lord's Day services are according to the Book of Common Prayer, it is reasonable to ascribe the label 'Prayer Book Catholic'. The church has since self-identified as Prayer Book Catholic on the front page of their website.
