= Tom Petrie (journalist) =

British journalist

Tom Petrie (10 December 1938 – 10 March 2023) was a British journalist who served as news editor of The Sun from 1980 to 1992.

== Biography ==
Petrie was born in Newcastle upon Tyne, England. His father, Thomas Petrie, worked as an advertising manager for the Hexham Courant, and his mother was Josephine Petrie (née Knox). After completing his secondary education at Leeds Grammar School, he undertook National Service in Gibraltar with the British Army. During this period, he met his first wife, Wilma. The couple later divorced, and Petrie subsequently married Meg Little.

Following his military service, Petrie began working on local newspapers and rose to the position of deputy editor at the Newcastle Chronicle. He joined The Sun in 1973 and was appointed news editor in 1980. During his tenure, the newspaper adopted a populist editorial stance aligned with the Conservative government led by Margaret Thatcher.

Petrie was involved in the creation of several headlines, including "Gotcha" in 1982, which reported the sinking of the Argentine warship General Belgrano during the Falklands War, and "Up Yours Delors!" in 1990, a response to comments made by European Commission President Jacques Delors. He also oversaw editorial stunts related to trade disputes and domestic political issues.

During the Wapping industrial dispute of the mid-1980s, Petrie supported the management's position and took part in morale-boosting activities for staff. Within the newsroom, he was known for an idiosyncratic management style and for mediating conflicts between editorial staff and senior management.

Petrie left The Sun in 1992 following a disagreement involving a deputy and the editor at the time. He later held brief roles at the Daily Mail and the Sunday People.
