= Frank Marsh =

Frank Marsh may refer to:

- Frank Lewis Marsh (1899–1992), American biologist, educator and creationist author
- Frank Marsh (footballer) (1916–1978), English footballer
- Frank Marsh (politician) (1924–2001), Nebraska politician
- Frank Marsh (nephrologist) (1936–2011), British nephrologist
- Frank Wayne Marsh (born 1940), former professional American football defensive back
