= John Gaisford =

British Anglican bishop (1934–2026)

The Right Reverend John Gaisford
- Bishop of Beverley
- Province: York
- Diocese: York
- See: Beverley
- In office: 1994–2000
- Predecessor: Robert Crosthwaite
- Successor: Martyn Jarrett
- Other posts: Archdeacon of Macclesfield; 1985–1994

Orders
- Ordination: 25 September 1960 (deacon); 24 September 1961 (priest) by William Greer
- Consecration: 7 March 1994 by John Habgood

Personal details
- Born: 7 October 1934
- Died: 4 January 2026 (aged 91) Crewe, United Kingdom
- Denomination: Anglican
- Education: Durham University

John Scott Gaisford (7 October 1934 – 4 January 2026) was a British Anglican bishop and was the second Bishop of Beverley. The first, Robert Crosthwaite had been a standard suffragan bishop within the Diocese of York from 1889 to 1923; Gaisford was the first appointed to be a provincial episcopal visitor ("flying bishop") for the Province of York when the Church of England began ordaining women as priests.

== Education and ministry ==
Gaisford was educated at Durham University, made a deacon at Michaelmas 1960 (25 September) and ordained a priest the Michaelmas following (24 September 1961) — both times by William Greer, Bishop of Manchester, at Manchester Cathedral — and began his ordained ministry with a curacy at St Hilda's Audenshaw. from 1960 to 1962. Following this he was curate at St Michael and All Angels in Bramhall, Cheshire until 1965 when he became vicar of St Andrew's Crewe and was Rural Dean of Nantwich from 1974 until 1985 and then Archdeacon of Macclesfield until 1994. He was consecrated a bishop on 7 March 1994, by John Habgood, Archbishop of York, at York Minster; and retired in 2000.

Gaisford died on 4 January 2026, aged 91.
