= Liberation of Rome =

1944 liberation from German occupation

- Part of Italian campaign, Mediterranean theatre of World War II
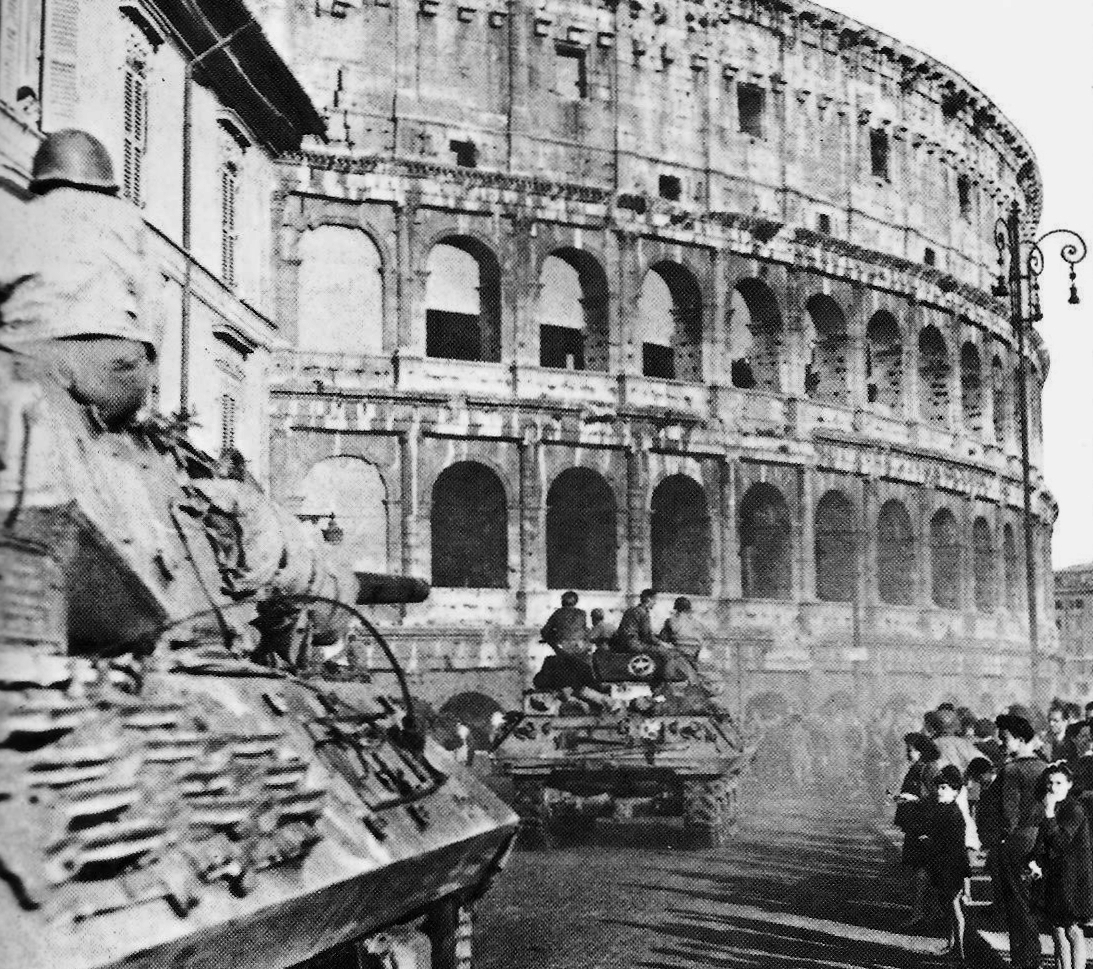
- American tanks passing the Colosseum during the liberation
Date	June 3–4, 1944
Location	Rome, Italy
Result	Allied victory

Belligerents
United Kingdom; United States	Germany

Commanders and leaders
(United Kingdom) Harold Alexander (United States) Mark W. Clark	(Nazi Germany) Albert Kesselring (Nazi Germany) Reiner Stahel

Units involved
(United Kingdom) 8th Army (United States) 5th Army; Other smaller units	(Nazi Germany) 10th Army (Nazi Germany) 14th Army

Strength
Over 300,000	

The liberation of Rome from German occupation in World War II was carried out on June 3–4, 1944 by American and British troops. Rome became the first of the three Axis capitals captured by the Allies, followed by Berlin and Tokyo. (Note: Unlike Nazi Germany and Empire of Japan, however, Italy at the time had effectively broke with the Axis by signing the Armistice of Cassibile after the fall of the local fascist regime.) Despite fierce resistance on its outskirts, German troops had been ordered to withdraw from Rome itself, allowing it to be captured almost without resistance. The city had been left largely undamaged by the occupying Germans, including the electricity and water supply.

A museum of the liberation was later established in the city.

== Background ==
During World War II, Rome became the capital of Fascist Italy. In July 1943, the Italian Fascist regime collapsed and the Armistice of Cassibile was signed by the new Italian government with the Allies. After the armistice's proclamation, the Germans launched Operation Achse to forcibly disarm the Italian forces. The Allies did not have enough troops to simultaneously protect Rome because at the time their bulk force in Italy was committed to Operation Avalanche against Germans elsewhere. The Italians were effectively defeated and Rome became occupied by Germans in September 1943, except Vatican City whose proclaimed neutrality was recognized by both the Germans and Allies. Rome was militarily significant for its airfields and extensive road and rail networks. Dwight D. Eisenhower and Winston Churchill saw the city's liberation as hugely important. On October 13, 1943, Italy declared war on Nazi Germany and received the status of a co-belligerent by the Allies.

=== Allied push to Rome ===
The Allied plan to liberate Rome was put forward by British General Harold Alexander and implemented by his subordinate American commander Mark W. Clark. Clark's intelligence reports relayed that the Germans had concentrated around Valmontone, thus denuding the area north of Anzio. Over the protest of Major General Lucian Truscott and without consulting Alexander, Clark decided to shift his main effort to Rome. On the morning of May 26, the bulk of American VI Corps shifted north for a push on Rome, breaking the southwest anchor of the last German defensive line before Rome. Clark assessed that "the overwhelming success of the current battle makes it possible to [...] launch a new attack along the most direct route to Rome". The push to Rome involved multiple Allied units. Pushing northwest, along the Via Appia Nuova, were Truscott’s 1st Armored Division and the 34th Infantry Division. On the east the 36th Infantry Division was pushing over the Alban Hills. Along the coast, the British 1st and 5th Infantry Divisions advanced to the north. There were also the 3rd, the 85th and the 88th Infantry Divisions, II Corps led by Major General Geoffrey Keyes and the 1st Special Service Force.

According to the records of Albert Kesselring and Alberto Giovannetti, the German military leadership wanted to spare Rome from destruction. Similarly, the Allied military authorities were advised to be "deeply conscious of the unique position occupied by Rome as one of the chief historical, religious, and cultural centers of the world, and of the fact that Rome is the seat of His Holiness the Pope and contains the neutral state of the Vatican City". The Allies intended to safeguard Rome's population and its historical heritage. The military action against Rome was considered "in so far as the Germans use the city, its railways and its roads, for their military purposes" and had they chosen to defend Rome, the Allies planned "to take appropriate military measures to eject them".

== Liberation ==
American infantry advancing toward the Rome's center past a burning German tank

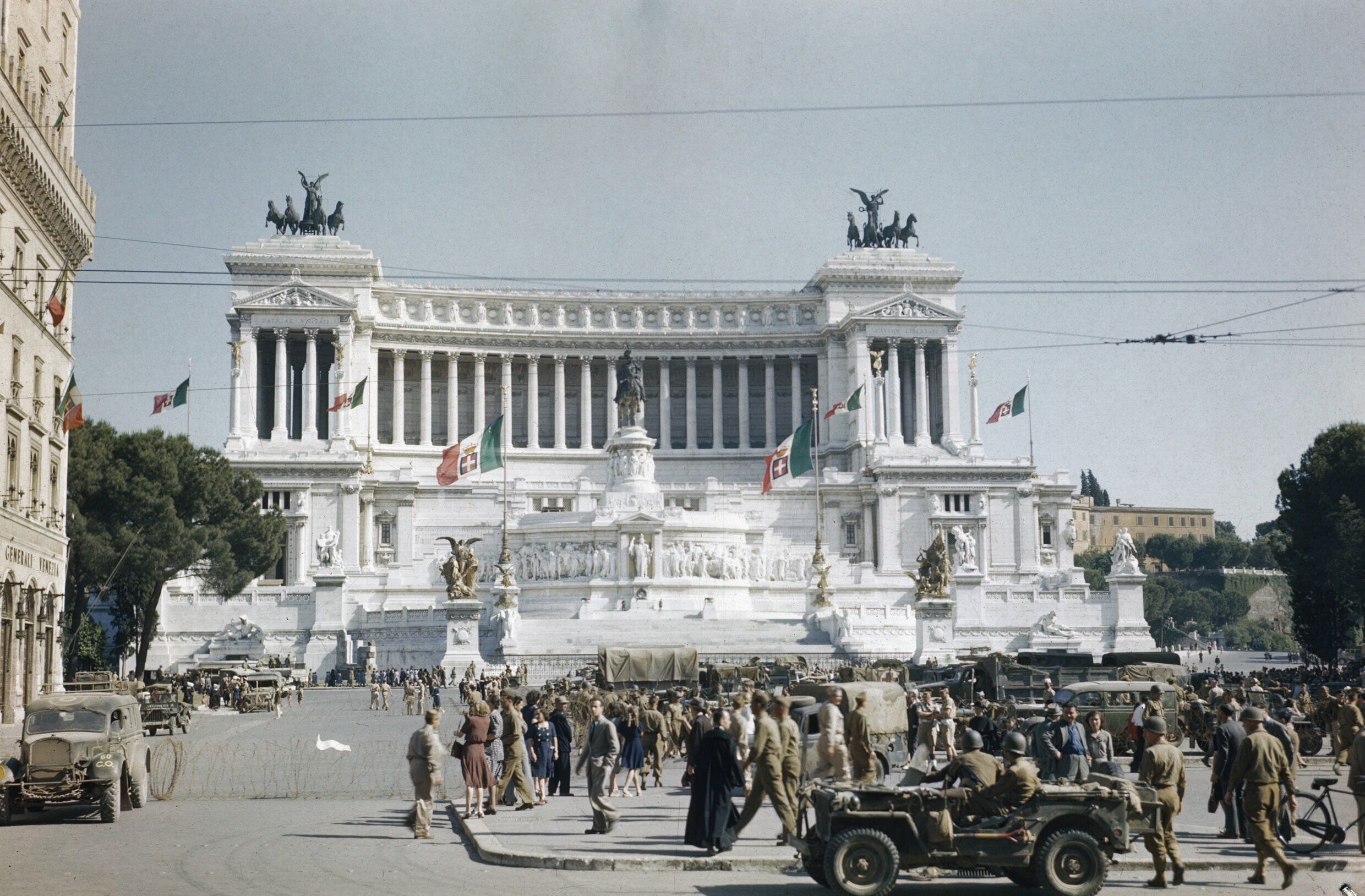
Allied forces at the Victor Emmanuel II Monument

As Clark's forces continued the push, Kesselring ordered his troops to withdraw north on June 2. Remaining parts of the German 10th and 14th Armies retreated through Rome, behind covering forces in Rome’s suburbs. At dawn on June 3, the II and VI Corps began their advance to Rome, while German 14th Army retreated through the Alban Hills and across the Tiber. On the morning of June 3, Kesselring declared Rome an open city, while Adolf Hitler ordered Kesselring that Rome "because of its status as a place of culture must not become the scene of combat operations". On the night of June 4 parts of the 1st Special Service Force, 1st Armored Division, and the 3d, 34th, 36th, 85th, and 88th Infantry Divisions entered Rome and quickly moved north. On June 4, Allied leaflets dropped on the city urged the Roman people "to protect the city from destruction".

Clark meanwhile wanted to secure the Tiber bridges, across which his advancing divisions could rapidly pursue the retiring Germans north of Rome. However, he was unaware that the Germans had been instructed not to destroy the bridges and he ordered mobile task forces to rush into Rome and seize them as soon as possible. Some ad hoc Allied task forces encountered concealed antitank guns and a few German tanks. Clark arrived in Rome late on the afternoon on June 4. The next day, he convened his corps commanders and staff officers at the city hall on the Capitoline Hill.

Having captured the city, the Allied forces, rather than halting, moved on to harass the Germans on the morning of June 5 along a 20-mile front from the mouth of the Tiber southwest of Rome northeast to its confluence with the Aniene.

== Reactions ==
Pope Pius XII addressing the crowd

In Rome, wide celebrations took place. Shops closed and large crowds took to the streets, cheering, waving and throwing flowers at the passing army vehicles. BBC war correspondent Godfrey Talbot recorded the cheers of the crowds in the city after the liberation. Fred Walker, commander of the American 36th Division, recalled: "As we moved along the dark streets, we could hear the people at all the windows of the high buildings clapping their hands". On June 5, Pope Pius XII addressed the crowds from the balcony of St. Peter's Basilica with the words: "In recent days we trembled for the fate of the city. Today we rejoiced because, thanks to the joint goodwill of both sides, Rome has been saved from the horrors of war".

In the United States, President Franklin D. Roosevelt in a broadcast welcomed the city's liberation with the words, "One up, two to go", referring to the two remaining Axis capitals. The American military authorities in London said Harold Alexander's methods had compelled the Germans to evacuate Rome without destructive fighting in the city.

Following the liberation, Rome also became a destination for Allied servicemen on leave, who visited its historic monuments and religious sites. British soldiers were photographed sightseeing all over Rome in June 1944. Allied military authorities produced tourist guidebooks to help soldiers navigate the city and its cultural attractions.

A British soldier reading a Rome guidebook on Pincian Hill, with St. Peter's Basilica in the distance.
