= Richard Watson (bishop of Burnley) =

Richard Charles Challinor Watson (16 February 1923 – 1 March 1998) was an Anglican clergyman who was the seventh Bishop of Burnley from 1970 to 1988.

Born in Watford, Hertfordshire, he was the son of Francis William Watson, CB MC TD DL and his wife, Alice Madelein Collings-Wells. He was educated at Rugby and New College, Oxford and studied for ordination at Westcott House, Cambridge before a curacy in Stratford, London . After that he was successively: a tutor at Wycliffe Hall, Oxford; Chaplain of Wadham College, Oxford; Vicar of Hornchurch; and finally, before his ordination to the episcopate, Rural Dean of Havering.

He married Anna Chavasse, elder daughter of the Bishop of Rochester Christopher Chavasse. He retired to Thame in 1988 and died 10 years later in Bullingdon, Oxfordshire.

Church of England titles
| Preceded by George Edward Holderness | Bishop of Burnley; 1970 – 1988 | Succeeded by Ronald James Milner |
