= Martyn Jarrett =

Bishop of Beverley; Bishop of Burnley

The Right Reverend Martyn Jarrett SSC
- Bishop of Beverley
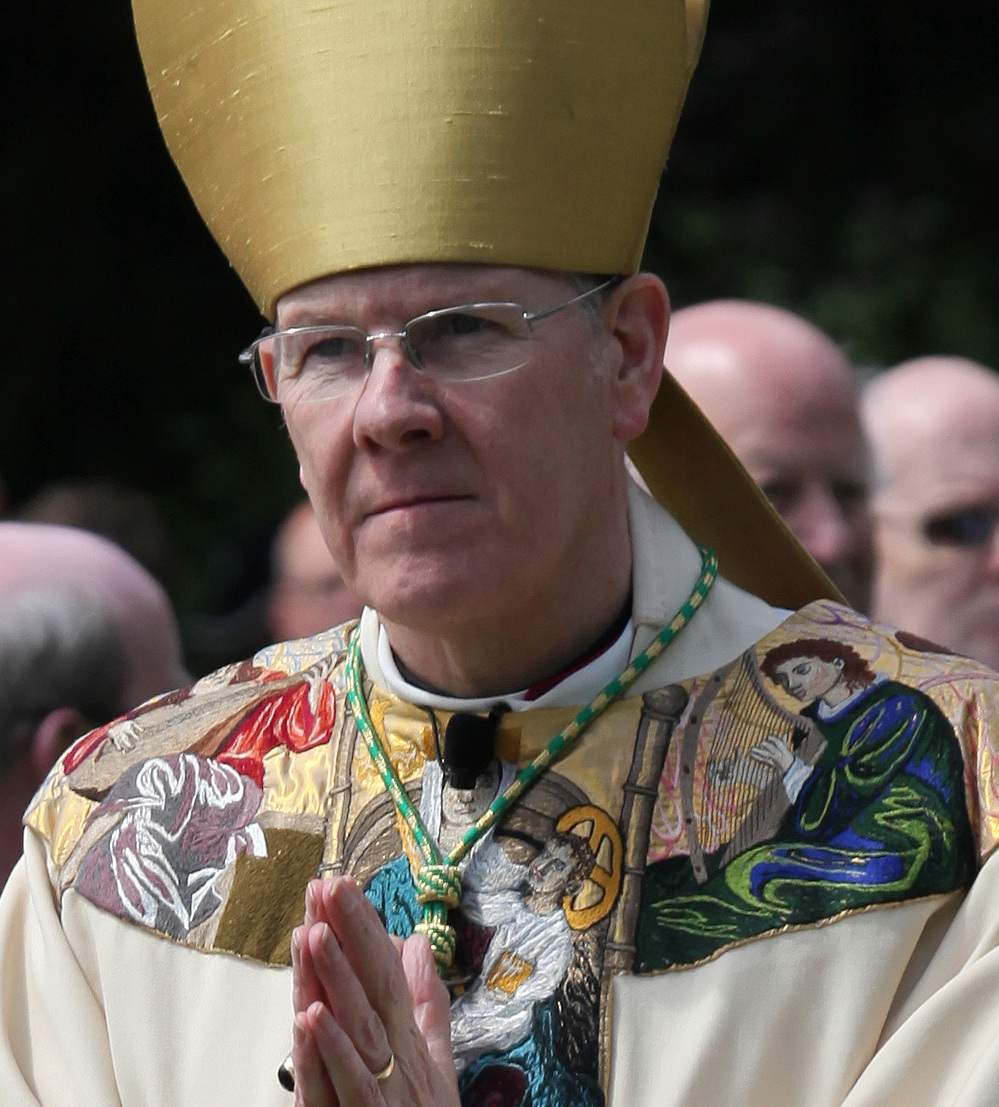
- Jarrett in 2012
- Church: Church of England
- Province: Province of York
- Diocese: Diocese of York
- In office: 2000–2012
- Predecessor: John Gaisford
- Successor: Glyn Webster
- Other posts: Bishop of Burnley (1994–2000); Bishop of Beverley (2000–2012)

Orders
- Ordination: 1968 (deacon); 1969 (priest)
- Consecration: 1994 by John Habgood

Personal details
- Born: 25 October 1944 (age 81) Kingsdown, Bristol, England
- Denomination: Anglican
- Spouse: Betty
- Children: 2 daughters
- Education: King's College London

Martyn William Jarrett SSC AKC (born 25 October 1944) is a retired Anglican bishop. He was the Bishop of Beverley in the Church of England from 2000 to 2012.

== Early life and education ==
Jarrett was educated at Cotham Grammar School and King's College London (BD, AKC).

== Ordained ministry ==
He was ordained in 1968 and began his ordained ministry with a curacy in Bristol followed by one in Swindon. Following this, he held incumbencies in Northolt and then Hillingdon. From 1985 to 1991, he worked for the Advisory Council on Church Ministry and was then vicar of St Mary and All Saints, Chesterfield before his ordination to the episcopate.

He was consecrated as a bishop by John Habgood, Archbishop of York, on 2 February 1994 at York Minster and translated to be a provincial episcopal visitor in 2000. He is a keen ornithologist. Before he became the Bishop of Beverley he was the Bishop of Burnley. After he moved in 2000 he was replaced by John Goddard.

It was announced in December 2011 that Jarrett would retire as Bishop of Beverley on 30 September 2012. He was replaced by Glyn Webster as the Bishop of Beverley.

== Styles ==
- The Reverend Martyn Jarrett (1970–1994)
- The Right Reverend Martyn Jarrett (1994–present)

Church of England titles
| Preceded by Ronald Milner | Bishop of Burnley; 1994–2000 | Succeeded by John Goddard |
| Preceded by John Gaisford | Bishop of Beverley; 2000–2012 | Succeeded by Glyn Webster |
