= George Holderness =

Anglican bishop

George Edward Holderness (5 March 1913 – 21 October 1987) was an Anglican bishop.

He was born in 1913 and educated at Leeds Grammar School and Keble College, Oxford. Ordained in 1936, he began his career with a curacy at Bedale and was then Chaplain at Aysgarth School until 1947, a period interrupted by World War II service as a Chaplain to the Forces. He was then Vicar of St Cuthbert's Church, Darlington and for 15 years suffragan Bishop of Burnley in the Diocese of Blackburn. In 1970 he left Burnley to become Dean of Lichfield, a post he held to retirement in 1979. He died in 1987.

Church of England titles
| Preceded by Charles Keith Kipling Prosser | Bishop of Burnley; 1955 –1970 | Succeeded by Richard Charles Challinor Watson |
| Preceded by William Stuart MacPherson | Dean of Lichfield; 1970 –1979 | Succeeded by John Harley Lang |
