= Henry Henn =

Church of England bishop

- Bishop of Burnley
- Diocese: Diocese of Manchester (until 1926); Diocese of Blackburn (thereafter)
- In office: 1909 – 1931 (d.)
- Predecessor: Alfred Pearson
- Successor: Priestley Swain

Orders
- Ordination: 1886
- Consecration: 1909 by Cosmo Lang (York)

Personal details
- Born: 8 October 1858
- Died: 21 October 1931 (aged 73)
- Denomination: Anglican
- Education: Trinity Hall, Cambridge

Henry Henn (8 October 1858 – 21 October 1931) was a Church of England bishop. He was the third Bishop of Burnley from 1909 to 1931.

Born in Greystones, County Wicklow, Ireland on 8 October 1858, he was educated at Sherborne School and Trinity Hall, Cambridge. Ordained in 1886, his first post was a curacy at Preston Parish Church, after which he returned to his old college as its Dean. He moved back to Lancashire, at first as Vicar of St Paul’s in Preston, then he became Rural Dean of St Peter's, Bolton on 21 January 1902. During his incumbency at Bolton, he was appointed an honorary canon of Manchester Cathedral in 1903. In 1909, he was ordained to the episcopate, becoming the suffragan Bishop of Burnley. He was consecrated a bishop on 11 July 1909, by Cosmo Lang, Archbishop of York, at York Minster. He kept this position until his death on 21 October 1931.

Church of England titles
Preceded by Alfred Pearson	Bishop of Burnley; 1909 – 1931	Succeeded by Priestley Swain
