= John Lang (priest) =

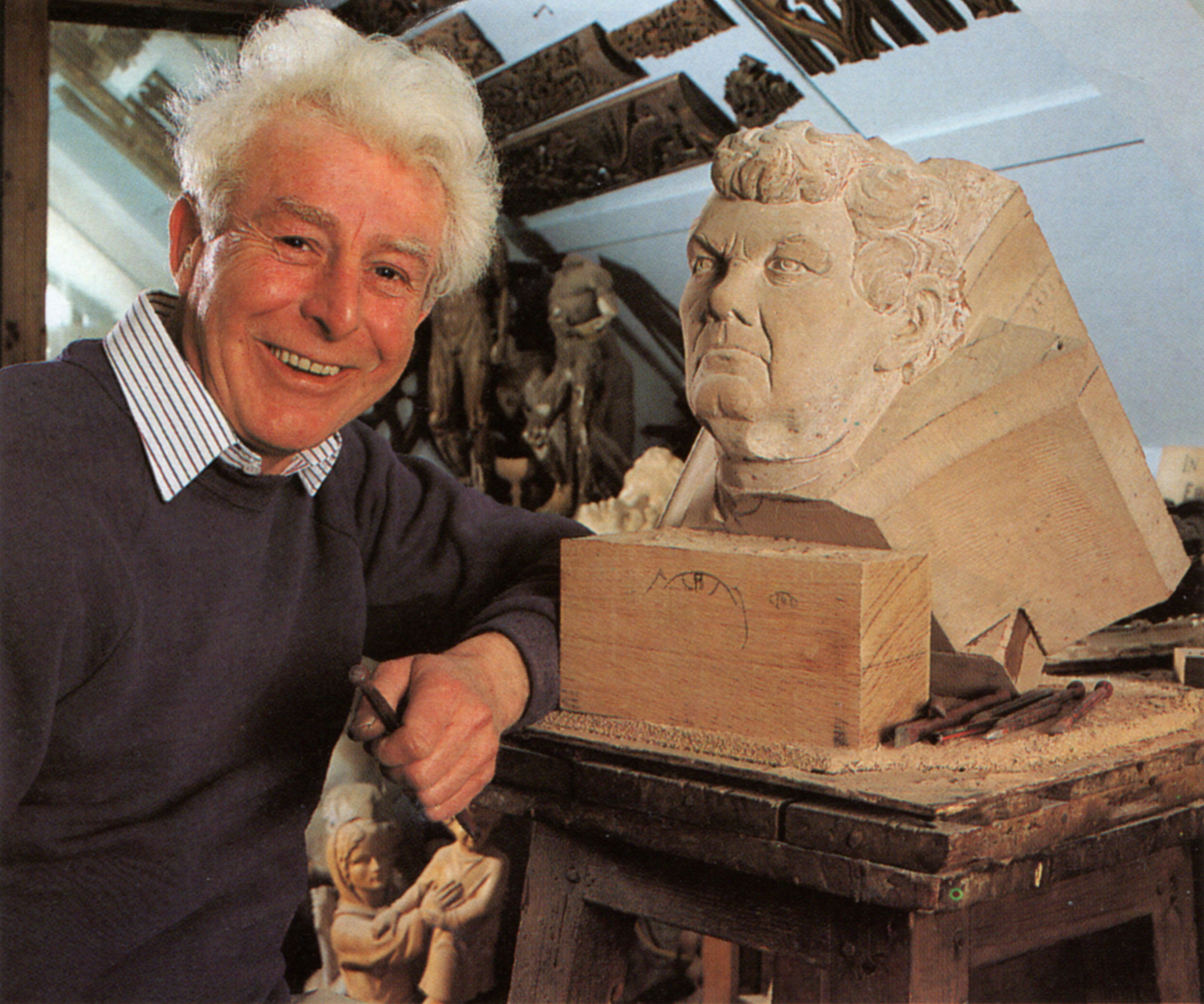
Denis Alva Parsons working on the portrait head of John Lang (Lichfield Cathedral)

John Harley Lang (27 October 1927 – 3 June 2012) was an Anglican priest in the second half of the 20th century.

Lang was educated at Merchant Taylors' and trained for the priesthood at King's College London. After National Service with the 12th Royal Lancers he was ordained in 1952. Following a curacy at the large city parish of St Mary's, Portsea, Portsmouth he was Priest Vicar of Southwark Cathedral then Chaplain of Emmanuel College, Cambridge. From 1963 until 1980 he worked in religious broadcasting for the BBC. Finally he was Dean of Lichfield for 13 years. He died on 3 June 2012.

Church of England titles
Preceded by George Holderness	Dean of Lichfield; 1980–1993	Succeeded by Tom Wright
