= Bishop of Burnley =

Suffragan bishop in the Church of England

The Bishop of Burnley is an episcopal title used by a suffragan bishop of the Church of England Diocese of Blackburn, in the Province of York, England.

The title takes its name after the town of Burnley in Lancashire. Originally, the suffragan bishops were appointed for the diocese of Manchester, but with the creation of the Diocese of Blackburn in 1926, Burnley came under the jurisdiction of the Bishop of Blackburn. Until 1977, the bishop was ex officio rector of St Peter's Church, Burnley.

== List of bishops ==
Bishops of Burnley
From	Until	Incumbent	Notes
1901	1904	Edwyn Hoskyns	Translated to Southwell
1905	1909	Alfred Pearson	Consecrated Rector and Bishop Suffragan of Burnley on 2 Feb 1905, died in office of TB on 19 Mar 1909.
1909	1931	Henry Henn	
1931	1949	Priestley Swain	
1950	1954	Keith Prosser	
1955	1970	George Holderness	
1970	1988	Richard Watson	
1988	1994	Ronald Milner	
1994	2000	Martyn Jarrett	Translated to Beverley
2000	2014	John Goddard	Retired 19 July 2014.
2015	2023	Philip North	Previously Bishop-designate of Whitby (October–December 2012); consecrated 2 February 2015 at York Minster; Bishop-nominate of Sheffield (January – March 2017); translated to Blackburn, 2023
2024	present	Joe Kennedy	Previously Vicar of Oxton St Saviour; consecrated 19 July 2024 at York Minster
