= John Goddard (bishop) =

British Catholic priest

The Reverend Monsignor John Goddard
- former Bishop of Burnley
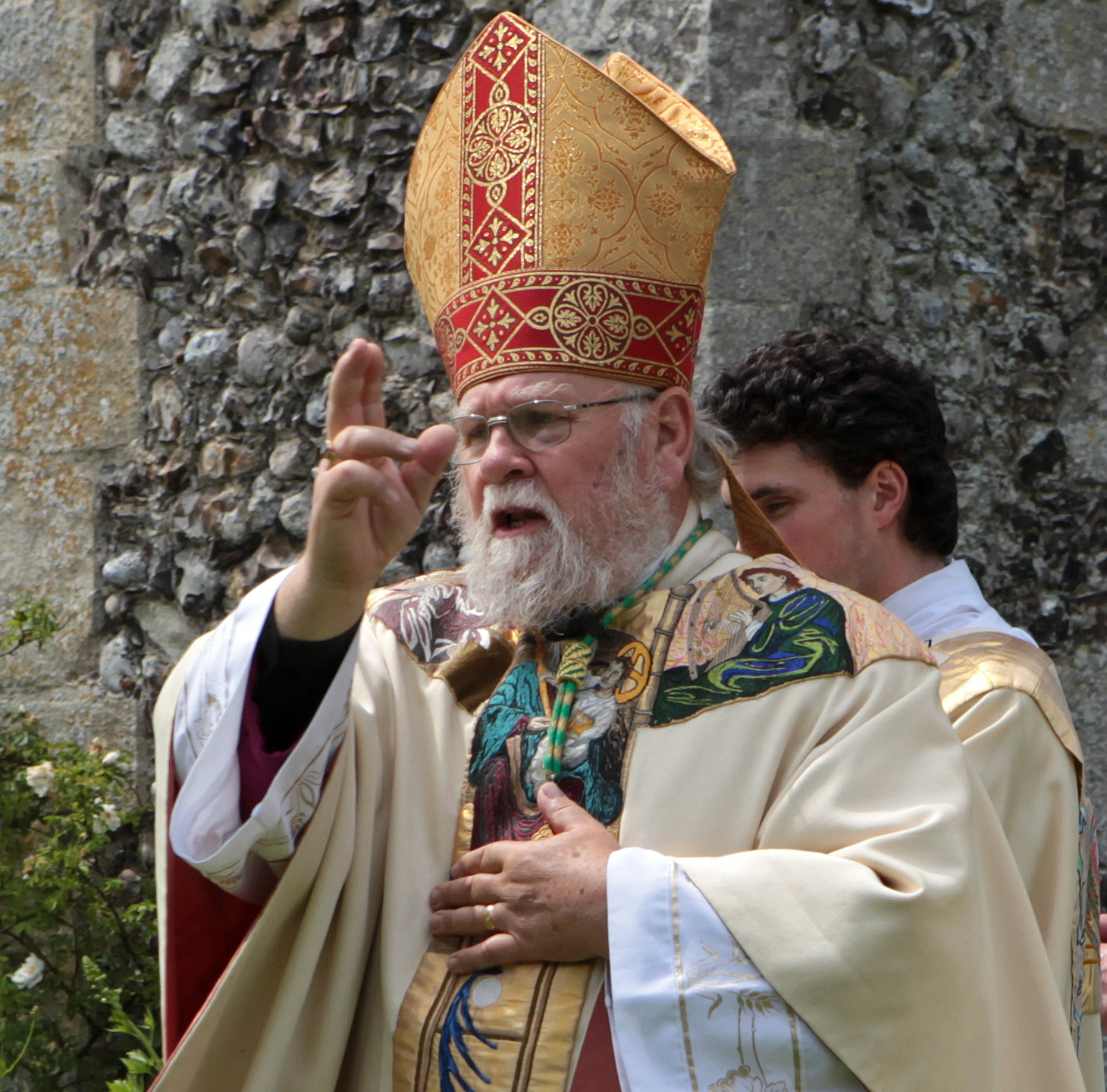
- Goddard in 2014
- Church: Roman Catholic
- Province: York
- Diocese: Blackburn
- See: Burnley
- Installed: 9 December 2000
- Term ended: 19 July 2014 (retired)
- Predecessor: Martyn Jarrett
- Successor: Philip North

Orders
- Ordination: 1970 (Anglican deacon); 1971 (Anglican priest); 2022 (Catholic deacon); 2022 (Catholic priest)
- Consecration: 7 December 2000 by David Hope

Personal details
- Born: 8 September 1947 (age 79)
- Denomination: Roman Catholic (formerly Anglican)
- Spouse: Vivienne
- Children: 2
- Education: Durham University; Wells Cathedral School

John William Goddard (born 8 September 1947) is a British Roman Catholic priest and former Anglican bishop. From 2000 to 2014, he was Bishop of Burnley, a suffragan bishop in the Church of England's Diocese of Blackburn. He left the Church of England and was received into the Roman Catholic Church in 2021. He was ordained deacon on Tuesday 29 March 2022 and priest on Saturday 2 April 2022 by Bishop Tom Williams in the Metropolitan Cathedral of Christ the King, Liverpool.

== Early life ==
Goddard studied theology at St Chad's College, Durham, and graduated from Durham University with a Bachelor of Arts (BA) degree in 1969. He then gained a Diploma in Theology (DipTh).

== Ordained ministry ==
Goddard was ordained in the Church of England as a deacon in 1970 and as a priest in 1971. He began his ordained ministry as a curate at St John's Southbank before continuing as a curate at Cayton and Eastfield (Scarborough) under the guidance of Alan A. Millar. He then held two incumbencies in Middlesbrough and became the rural dean. From 1988 to 1992 he was vice principal of Edinburgh Theological College and then rector of Ribbleton before his ordination to the episcopate.

Goddard was consecrated a bishop on 7 December 2000 by David Hope, Archbishop of York. On 9 December 2000, he was installed as Bishop of Burnley, a suffragan bishop in the Diocese of Blackburn.

Goddard retired on 19 July 2014.

=== Views ===
He has expressed the belief (2012) that there are no totally rural parishes in the Diocese of Blackburn, which includes large swathes of farming communities and extensive rural areas such as the Forest of Bowland. This is because most of the rural areas in the villages have residents whose involvement in commercial, academic, professional and urban matters reflect a more suburban character.

At the November 2012 meeting of the General Synod of the Church of England, Goddard was one of the three members of the House of Bishops who voted against the ordination of women as bishops.

== Roman Catholic Church ==
It was announced on 21 May 2021 that Goddard would be received into the Roman Catholic Church on the Feast of Pentecost, 23 May, by the auxiliary bishop of Liverpool. On 2 April 2022, he was ordained to the priesthood by Tom Williams during a service at Liverpool Metropolitan Cathedral; and serves as a priest of the Archdiocese of Liverpool. In April 2023, he was appointed a Chaplain of His Holiness, and thereby granted the title "Monsignor".

Goddard did not join the Personal Ordinariate of Our Lady of Walsingham, a canonical structure created for former Anglicans who had joined the Roman Catholic Church which has its own missal, but instead incorporated into the Archdiocese of Liverpool. His first post was as an assistant priest at St Oswald's Church, Longton. In September 2023, he was appointed parochial administrator of Our Lady Help of Christians, Tarleton.

== Personal life ==
Goddard is a keen narrowboater. He is married to Vivienne. Together they have two children; Michael and Gareth.

== Styles ==
- The Reverend John Goddard (1971–1987)
- The Reverend Canon John Goddard (1987–2000)
- The Right Reverend John Goddard (2000–2021)
- The Reverend John Goddard (2022–present)

Church of England titles
| Preceded by Martyn Jarrett | Bishop of Burnley; 2000–2014 | Succeeded by Philip North |
