= St John the Evangelist's Church, Leeds =

Coordinates: 53.8001°N 1.5423°W

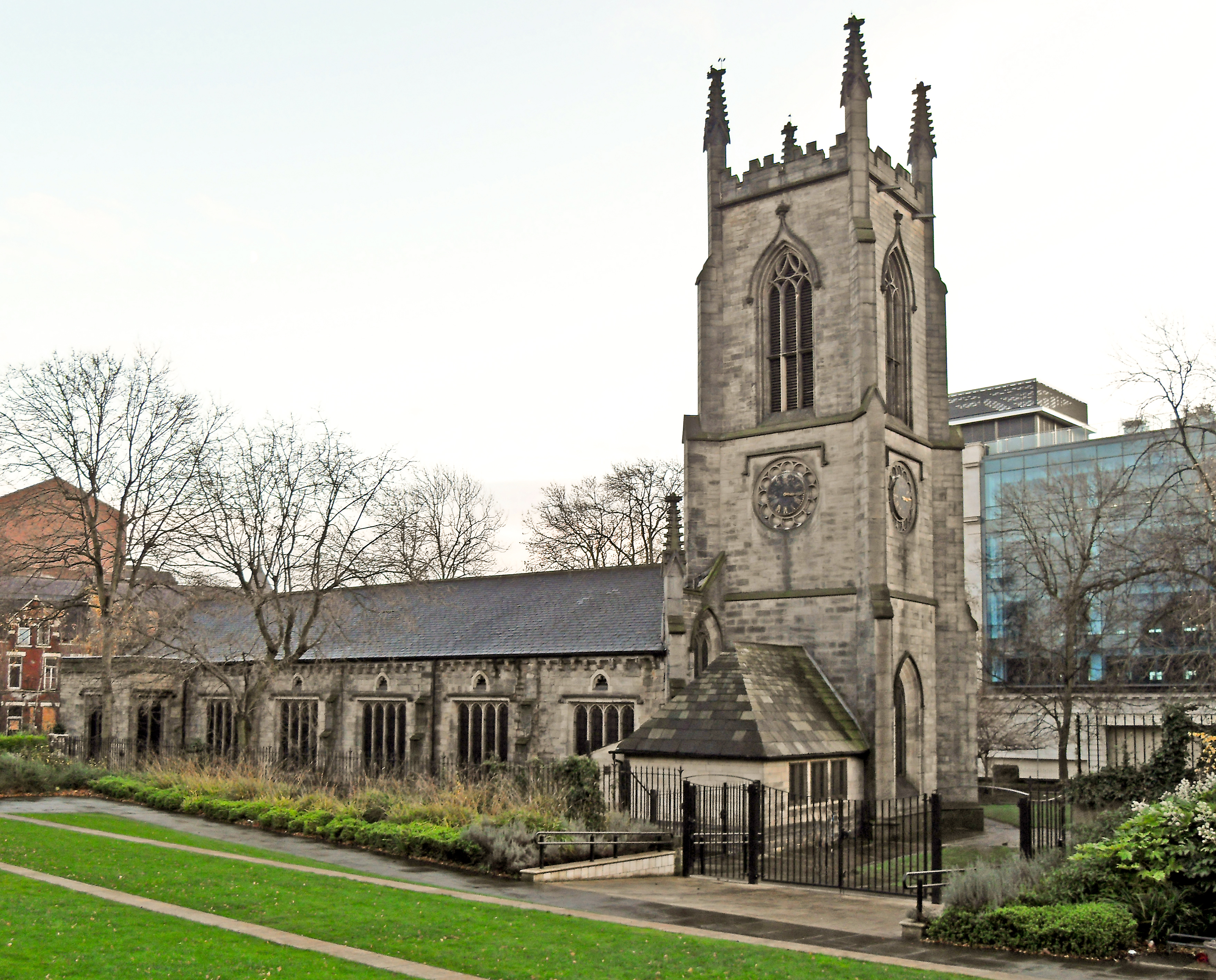
- St John the Evangelist's Church, Leeds, from the north-west

- Location in West Yorkshire
- OS grid reference: SE 302 338
- Location: New Briggate, Leeds, West Yorkshire
- Country: England
- Denomination: Anglican
- Website: Churches Conservation Trust

History
- Founder: John Harrison
- Dedication: Saint John the Evangelist

Architecture
- Functional status: Redundant
- Heritage designation: Grade I
- Designated: 26 September 1963
- Architectural type: Church
- Style: Gothic
- Groundbreaking: 1632
- Completed: 1838

Specifications
- Materials: Stone, slate roof

St John the Evangelist's Church is a redundant Anglican church in the centre of the city of Leeds, West Yorkshire, England. It is recorded in the National Heritage List for England as a designated Grade I listed building, and is under the care of the Churches Conservation Trust. The architectural historian Nikolaus Pevsner refers to it as "the only church at Leeds of more than local interest".

== History ==
St John's is the oldest church in the city centre of Leeds. It was begun in 1631 and was consecrated in 1634, at a time when few churches were being built. It was paid for by John Harrison, who was a wealthy wool merchant and local benefactor. The church was altered between 1830 and 1838; this included remodelling of the tower by John Clark. In the middle of the 19th century the parish planned to demolish the church and build a more modern one. A successful campaign to rescue it was supported by Richard Norman Shaw and Sir George Gilbert Scott. Gilbert Scott said that 'no other town in England can produce a parallel', persuading the Bishop to allow it to be restored rather than destroyed. In 1866–68 Shaw restored the church, and added a south porch and a new vestry. From 1890 Temple Moore reinstated some of the 17th-century woodwork removed by Shaw, and carried out further restoration. St John's was declared redundant on 1 November 1975, and was vested in the Trust on 17 January 1977.

== Architecture ==
"the only church at Leeds of more than local interest"

— Nikolaus Pevsner

The South side of the church

=== Exterior ===
The style of the architecture from the outside could be mistaken for the late 15th century. The church is built in ashlar stone, and has a grey slate roof. Its plan consists of a nave with a south aisle and a south porch, a chancel, and a west tower. The whole of the exterior of the church is embattled with pinnacles at the corners. Its architectural style is Perpendicular. The tower is in three stages and has diagonal buttresses. In the bottom stage is a two-light west window; the middle stage contains a clock face on the north, west and south sides; and in the top stage are three-light bell openings. The porch has angle buttresses, and an arched doorway with a sundial above. On each side of the church are four-light Perpendicular windows, with five-light windows at the east ends of the nave and aisle, and at the west end of the aisle. Internally the arcade is carried on octagonal piers, the capitals of which are carved with acanthus leaves and ball ornaments. The roof is highly decorated, containing tie beams, corbels carved with angels and musicians, gilded pendants, and panels decorated with roses and other plants.

=== Interior ===
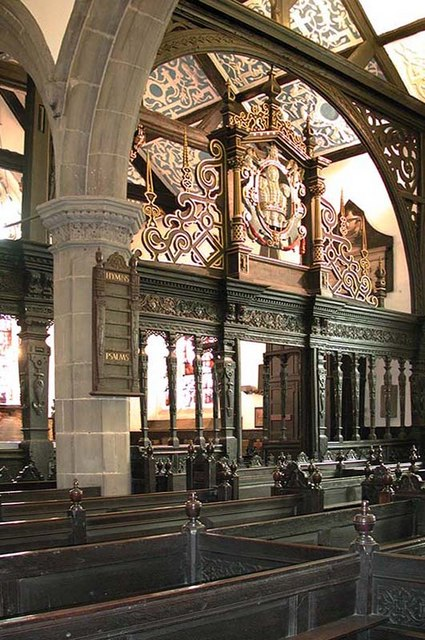
Screen and pews

The richly carved decoration and plasterwork follow late 16th century styles derived from the Low Countries. Most of the fittings are Jacobean in style, and have been described as the "glory" of the church. This applies particularly to the elaborately carved screen across the nave and the aisle. There is similarly detailed carving on the wall panels, the pews and the pulpit. Also in the church is a royal coat of arms and three brass chandeliers. The stained glass dates from the 19th century, and includes a memorial window to John Harrison, depicting him performing good deeds, and directing the building of the church. Around the church are memorials to other citizens of the city.

== See also ==
- Grade I listed buildings in West Yorkshire
- Grade I listed churches in West Yorkshire
- List of church restorations and alterations by Temple Moore
- List of churches preserved by the Churches Conservation Trust in Northern England
- Listed buildings in Leeds (City and Hunslet Ward - northern area)
