= Priestley Swain =

Bishop of Burnley

Edgar Priestley Swain (11 April 1881 – 25 July 1949) was the fourth Bishop of Burnley from 1931 until 1949.

== Biography ==
Born in Stoke Newington, London, he was the son of banker Harry Edwin Swain and Elizabeth Milsted. He was educated at St John's College, Cambridge and Ripon College Cuddesdon. He was successively Curate of Holy Trinity with All Souls, Birchfield, Chaplain to the Bishop of Birmingham, Vicar of Putney and Rural Dean of Barnes before ascending to the Episcopate. A man "whose great gifts marked him out for preferment," his scholarship was considered a great asset to the Church in the mid-20th century.

He died in Burnley while in office in 1949.

Church of England titles
Preceded by Henry Henn	Bishop of Burnley; 1931 – 1949	Succeeded by Charles Keith Kipling Prosser
