= Alfred Pearson (bishop) =

British Anglican bishop (1848–1909

- Bishop of Burnley
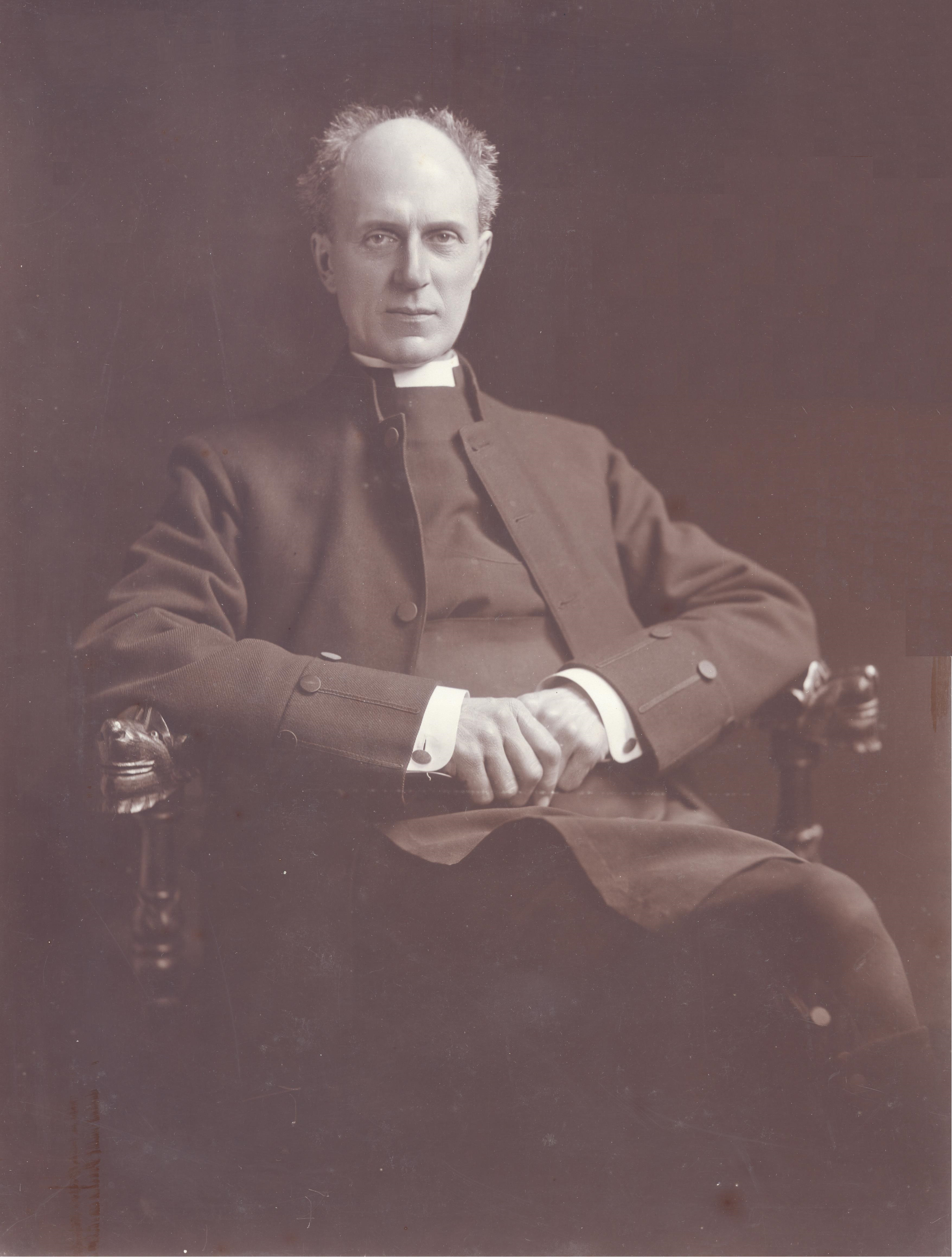
- Diocese: Diocese of Manchester
- In office: 1905–1909
- Predecessor: Edwyn Hoskyns
- Successor: Henry Henn
- Other post: Rector of Burnley (1905–1909)

Orders
- Ordination: 1874
- Consecration: 1905 by William Maclagan

Personal details
- Born: 30 April 1848 Brixton, Surrey, United Kingdom
- Died: 19 March 1909 (aged 60) Burnley, Lancashire, UK
- Denomination: Anglican
- Parents: Robert Pearson & Hannah née Brodrick
- Spouse: Caroline née Doncaster
- Education: Lincoln College, Oxford

Alfred Pearson (30 April 1848 – 19 March 1909) was the second Bishop of Burnley (a suffragan bishop in the Diocese of Manchester) from 1905 until his death.

Born at Clifton Lodge, Brixton Hills, Streatham in Brixton, Surrey, second son of Robert (a shipowner and Wharfinger at Stanton's wharf, Tooley Street, Southwark.) and his second wife, Hannah née Brodrick, and educated at Islington Grammar School and Lincoln College, Oxford, he graduated with a Bachelor of Arts on 6 July 1872, in 1872 he was appointed Curate of St Andrew's, Leedshe was ordained on Sunday 21 September 1873 by the Bishop of Ripon (Robert Bickersteth D.D. 1857–1884) at Ripon Cathedral. He was then appointed Curate of Knaresborough Parish Church between (1874) and (1877), Whilst he was a curate he continued his studies at Oxford and Graduated Lincoln College with a Master of Arts, Oxford, Thursday 27 June 1875, he was appointed incumbencies as Rector of St Ebbe's, Oxford on 20 October 1877, he was then appointed Vicar of The Living of All Saints' Church, Nottingham (1880–1888), whilst at Nottingham he met and Married Caroline Doncaster Noble, the eldest daughter of John Noble (Estate Manager of Woodhall, Watton, Heartfordshire), on 7 June 1883, on 30 May 1888 he was appointed Perpetual Curate of St Margaret's Church, Brighton (1888–1896). While living at Brighton, he started to make a name for himself. On 5 March 1890 (3rd week in Lent) he gave the Special Lenten Addresses under the dome of St Paul's Cathedral at 1:15pm. He had a book published, Christus Magister (Some teachings from the Sermon on the Mount by Alfred Pearson MA - price 5 shillings - "Twenty thoughtful, fresh and Vigorous Discourses"), He also wrote a Pamphlet called "The Christian Aims" price 1s. In Dec 1896 he was appointed to the Living of St Mark's, Sheffield (1896–1905, where in 1900 he was made Rural Dean of the area and prebendary of Osbaldwick, a canon of York from 1903) before his appointment to the episcopate. In Sheffield he was a strong Supporter of the Church Pastoral Aid Society, which raised funds to employ extra members of Church Staff. In 1897, on 21 May, Queen Victoria as part of her Diamond Jubilee celebrations, she opened the new Sheffield Town Hall. On her Arrival at the Town Hall the children sang a short hymn written by Alfred Pearson called "Loyal and Loving Children now Raising" the music was by Mr A Healey-Foster.

A hymn written by Rev Alfred Pearson for Queen Victoria. "Loyal and Loving the Children now Raising"

Blessings on Fatherland richly are falling, Crowning the ripening years that remain, Children of Fatherland blessings are calling, Down on their Empress-Queen's Diamond Reign.

In 1904 he was recommended to the vacant post as the Suffragan Bishop of Burnley by the Bishop of Manchester since he valued him as a fellow Evangelical who had worked in several "large Centers of Industrial Population". Pearson was consecrated a bishop by William Maclagan, Archbishop of York, at York Minster, on 2 February 1905, to serve as the 2nd suffragan Bishop of Burnley. He was also appointed to simultaneously serve as Rector of St Peter's, Burnley He died in office of TB in Burnley, Lancashire. He married Caroline Doncaster Noble. Before he died he Published "The Claims of the Faith on the Practice of Today" This was a selection of his Church Sermons.

Church of England titles
| Preceded by Edwyn Hoskyns | Bishop of Burnley; 1905–1909 | Succeeded by Henry Henn |
