= Glyn Webster =

British Anglican bishop (born 1951)

The Right Reverend Glyn Webster
- Bishop of Beverley
- Church: Church of England
- Province: Province of York
- Diocese: Diocese of York
- In office: 2013–2022
- Predecessor: Martyn Jarrett
- Successor: Stephen Race
- Other posts: Priest-in-charge All Saints' Church, North Street, York and St Mary Bishophill Junior, York (2022–); Honorary Assistant Bishop, Diocese of York (2022–)
- Previous posts: Acting Dean of York (2003–2004 & 2012); Queen's Chaplain (2011–2012); Canon chancellor, York Minster (2003–2013); Canon treasurer, York Minster (2000–2003)

Orders
- Ordination: 1977 (deacon); 1978 (priest)
- Consecration: 25 January 2013 by John Sentamu

Personal details
- Born: 3 June 1951 (age 75) Darwen, Lancashire, England
- Denomination: Anglican
- Education: Durham University

Glyn Hamilton Webster (born 3 June 1951) is a retired British Anglican bishop who was the Bishop of Beverley in the Church of England from January 2013 to January 2022. He was previously the canon chancellor (a canon residentiary) and Acting Dean of York at York Minster in the Diocese of York.

== Early life and education ==
Webster was born in 1951. He was educated at Darwen Secondary Technical School in Darwen, Lancashire, England. His first career was in National Health Service, working at the Blackburn Royal Infirmary and qualifying as a State Registered Nurse in 1973. He then trained for ordination at Cranmer Hall, Durham between 1974 and 1977.

== Ordained ministry ==
Webster was ordained in the Church of England as a deacon in 1977 and as a priest in 1978. He was a curate at All Saints' Church, Huntington in the Diocese of York from 1977 to 1981. From 1981 to 1992, he was Vicar of St Luke's Church, York. From 1981 to 1992, he was a chaplain at the York Hospital, known at the time as York District Hospital, and from 1992 to 1999, he was the Senior Chaplain for the York Health Services NHS Trust. He was additionally a canon and prebendary of York Minster from 1994 to 1999 and also Rural Dean for the City of York from 1997 to 2004. From 2005 to 2010, he was also Associate Diocesan Director of Ordinands. From 1999 his main role was as canon residentiary of York Minster — firstly as Treasurer until 2003, and then as Chancellor, and twice as Acting Dean during vacancies.

He was elected as a member of General Synod in 1995. From 2000 to January 2013, he served as prolocutor of the Lower House of the Convocation of York and also as a member of the Crown Nominations Commission and the Archbishops' Council. He was an Honorary Chaplain to the Queen (QHC) from 2010 until he was made a bishop.

=== Episcopal ministry ===
In August 2012, his appointment as the next Bishop of Beverley was announced following the announcement in December 2011 that Martyn Jarrett would retire as Bishop of Beverley on 30 September 2012. Beverley is the see reserved for the Provincial Episcopal Visitor for the Province of York.

Webster is a retired member of the Council of Bishops of The Society.

On 21 March 2021, it was announced that Webster would retire from full-time ministry and step down as Bishop of Beverley at Epiphany (6 January) 2022. In retirement, he has been Priest-in-charge at All Saints', North Street, York and St Mary Bishophill Junior, York since July 2022. He has also been an honorary assistant bishop in the Diocese of York since 2022.

=== Safeguarding Investigations and Past Case Reviews ===
In May 2016, Webster was one of six bishops accused of misconduct by an alleged victim of child sex abuse. He was cited in the Guardian and Church Times along with Peter Burrows, Steven Croft, Martyn Snow, Roy Williamson and Archbishop of York, John Sentamu as subject of Clergy Disciplinary Measure complaints owing to their inaction on the alleged victim's disclosure. The bishops contested the complaints because they were made after the church’s required one-year limit. All six bishops were pictured on a protest brochure which the alleged victim handed out at Steven Croft's enthronement as Bishop of Oxford later that year.

Webster was heavily criticised at the Independent Inquiry into Child Sex Abuse (IICSA) within the Church of England, and doubts were raised regarding the veracity of the evidence he gave to the inquiry after a victim had alleged that he had spoken with Webster about historical abuse by another Anglican bishop, and that the victim had “been advised by him not to report it” and to move on.

In October 2020, a report was published, entitled "A Betrayal of Trust" – an independent past case review requested by The Church of England, chaired by David Pearl. This found on the balance of probabilities that Webster had lied to the Independent Inquiry and had failed to act in a serious safeguarding breach within the Church.

On 23 October 2020 the Church Times reported the above findings and other national newspapers, including The Daily Telegraph, The Guardian and The Times all published articles suggesting that Webster might lose his office as Bishop of Beverley and might be banned from episcopal and priestly ministry within the Church of England. Webster resigned in 2022 whilst the accusations were still being investigated. He retired in January 2022 and was replaced as Bishop of Beverley by Stephen Race.

== Styles ==
- The Reverend Glyn Webster (1977–1994)
- The Reverend Canon Glyn Webster (1994–2013)
- The Right Reverend Glyn Webster (2013–present)
