= Leeds Grammar School =

Former grammar school in Yorkshire, England

Location
- Alwoodley Gates; Harrogate Road; Leeds, West Yorkshire, LS17 8GS; England; 53.86503°N 1.51851°W

Information
- Type: Private school Grammar school
- Motto: Nullius Non Mater Disciplinae (Nothing if not the Mother of Learning)
- Established: 1552 (1341)
- Founder: William Sheafield
- Local authority: City of Leeds
- Age: 4 to 18
- Enrolment: c. 1,500
- Houses: Thorseby, Clarell, Neville, Barry, Harrison, Sheafield, Ermystead, Lawson
- Publication: Leodiensian
- Merged: 2008

Leeds Grammar School was an independent school founded 1552 in Leeds, West Yorkshire, England. Originally a male-only school, in August 2005 it merged with Leeds Girls' High School to form The Grammar School at Leeds. The two schools physically united in September 2008.

The school was founded in 1552 by William Sheafield to provide free, subsidised or fee-paying education to the children of the City of Leeds. Despite 1552 being the traditional date for the foundation of the school, there is some evidence to suggest that the school existed as early as 1341. In 1805, the school was the subject of a ruling by Lord Eldon that set a precedent affecting grammar schools throughout England.

== History ==
Leeds Grammar School was founded in 1552, following the death of the Reverend William Sheafield in July of that year. Sheafield left £14 13s. 4d. in his will to maintain a schoolmaster "to teach and instruct freely for ever all such Younge Schollars Youthes and Children as shall come and resort to him from time to time to be taught instructed and informed", provided that a school house was built by the town of Leeds. The date for the school's foundation remains in doubt. Records indicate that there was a grammar school in Leeds as early as 1341. The school's first site is thought to have been in The Calls, by the River Aire, near the centre of the city. By about 1579 the school was in the New Chapel building at the head of Headingley Lane, where it remained until 1624. That year John Harrison, a great Leeds benefactor, removed the school "to a pleasant Field of his own which he surrounded with a substantial Wall and in the midst of the Quadrangle built the present Fabrick of the school". Harrison's school was on North Lane, on the site of the Grand Theatre opposite St John's Church. Through the years, the school grew steadily in numbers and reputation. Harrison's building was added onto in the 1640s by a new library, thanks to the endowment of Godfrey Lawson (Mayor of Leeds, 1669–70). The Lawson Library remains with the school (although it has moved to a number of different physical locations) making it the oldest library in Leeds. It was refurbished in 2007.

Towards the end of the 18th century, demand for Latin and Greek was falling, while Leeds was growing as a centre of commerce and industry. In 1791 the trustees proposed to appoint a third master, to teach writing and accounts, and a fourth to teach French and other modern languages. The plan was opposed by the master and usher. With the two sides unable to agree, a suit in the Court of Chancery began in 1795. In 1805, Lord Eldon, the Lord Chancellor, in a ruling that set a precedent for grammar schools across the country, proclaimed, "There is no authority for thus changing the nature of the Charity, and filling a School intended for the purpose of teaching Greek and Latin with Scholars learning the German and French languages, mathematics, and anything except Greek and Latin." He offered as a compromise that other subjects might be taught, as long as all boys also learnt the classical languages. On the death of the master in 1815, the trustees appointed one of their number as acting master, and effected the desired changes.

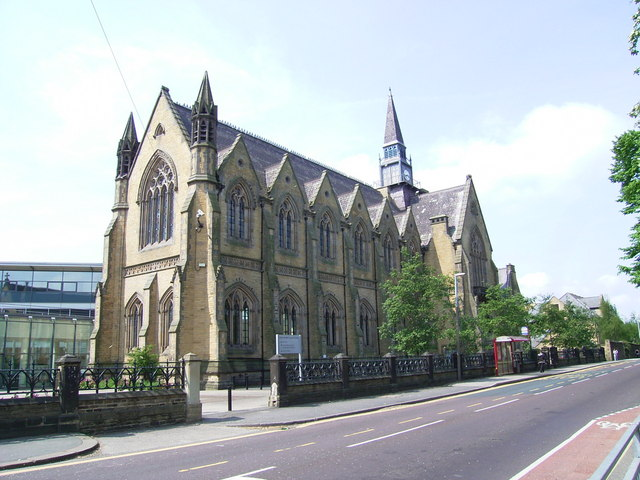
Woodhouse Moor site (now part of the University of Leeds)

By 1857, Leeds was growing prodigiously during the Industrial Revolution. The city conditions were dirty and Harrison's buildings inadequate for a Victorian education. In 1857 the decision was made by Rev. Alfred Barry (Headmaster) to move the school to new premises next to Woodhouse Moor. The building, in Gothic Revival style, opened in June 1859. The building was designed by Edward Middleton Barry, brother of the headmaster, Rev. Alfred Barry, after whom one of the eight houses was named. At that time the school roll numbered fewer than 100 boys and the buildings were planned for 200. Serious consideration was given in the 1920s to moving the school to Lawnswood – the current site of Leeds University's playing fields.

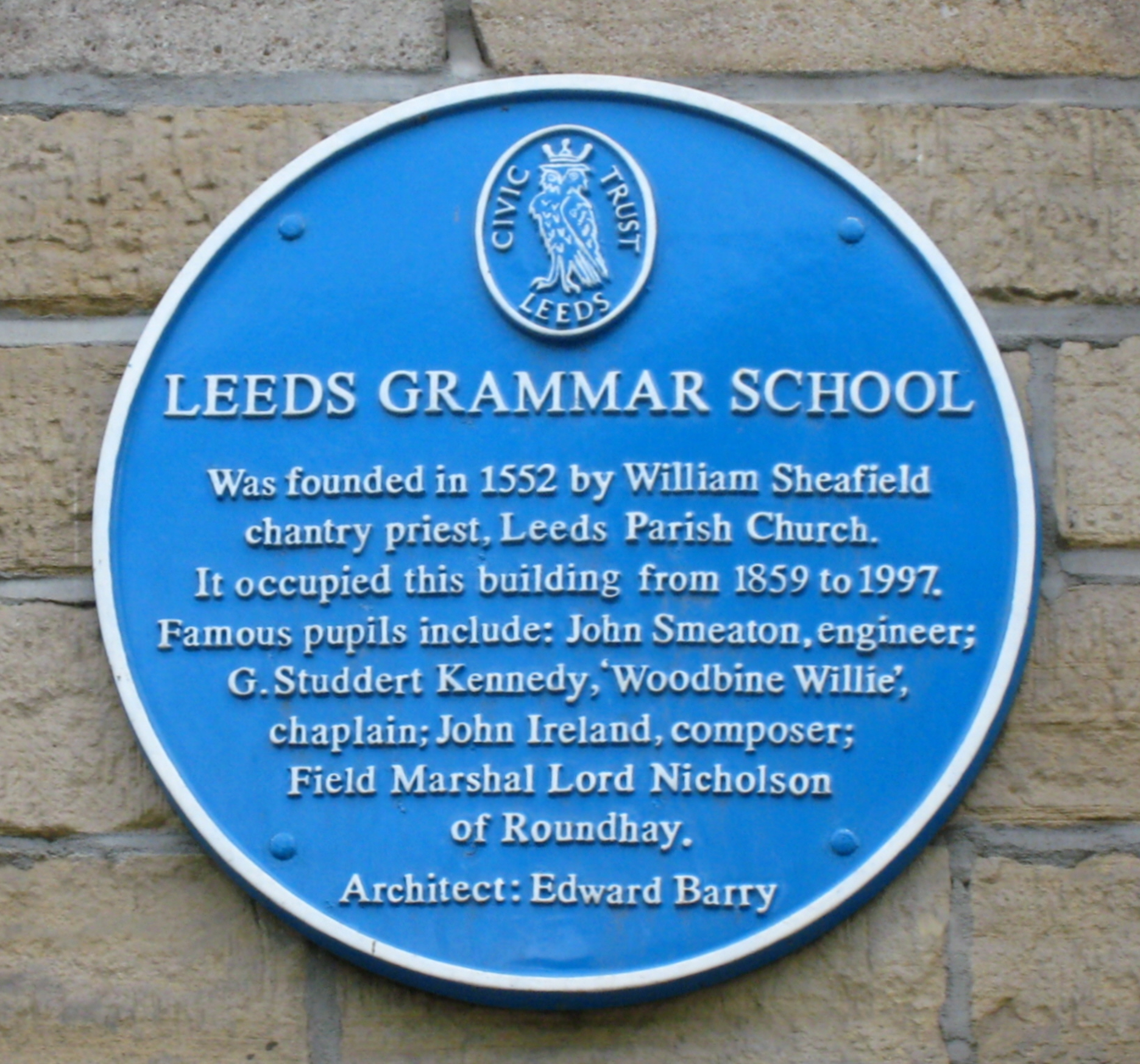
Leeds Grammar School plaque 25 July 2017

The school was in the direct grant scheme in the 1950s to 1970s, and the assisted places scheme in the 1970s to 1990s. Throughout the 20th century the school continued to expand, with the building of a swimming pool, sports hall, theatre, a design and technology department, assembly hall and classroom block. By the 1990s, the roll had risen to over 1,100 boys and the school operated on three separate sites. Despite continuous improvements to accommodate increased numbers and the requirements of a contemporary curriculum, no further development of the facilities was economically viable without great detriment to the education of the pupils. The area of Leeds surrounding the school, Hyde Park, was in decline and the University of Leeds was also seeking to expand and so the decision was taken by the school governors and the university to exchange the Woodhouse Moor, Junior School and Lawnswood premises for a university-owned 138-acre (0.56 km^{2}) site in Alwoodley to the north of Leeds. The Woodhouse Moor premises are now occupied by Leeds University Business School.

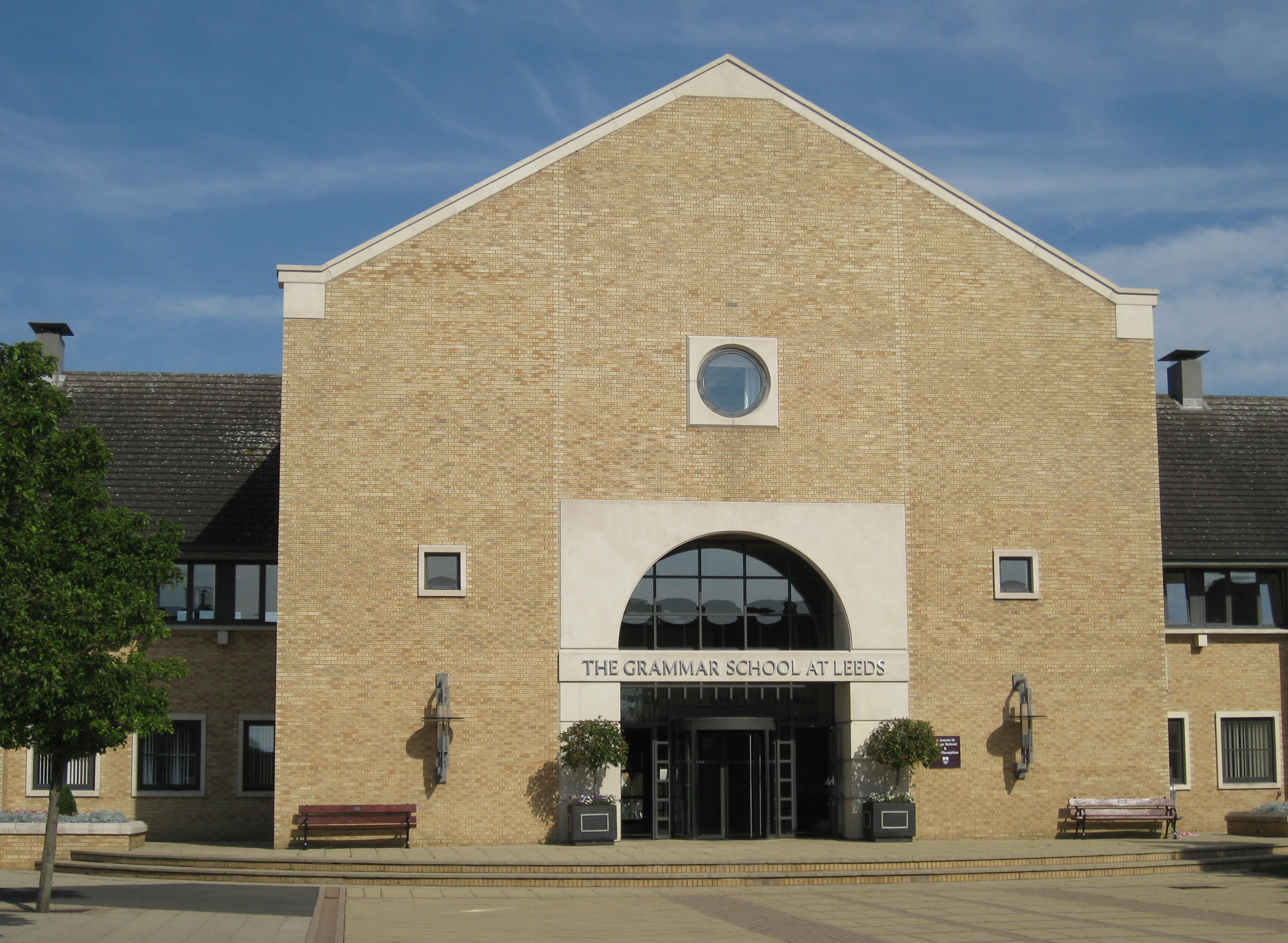
Main entrance to the complex at the Alwoodley Campus

In September 1997, at a cost of £18.5 million and after three years’ construction, Leeds Grammar School opened in Alwoodley Gates. In 1999 a new Headmaster Dr Mark Bailey was appointed. Following the shrinking of Leeds' child population, staff shortages and Leeds Girls' High School's need for more adequate modern buildings the decision was taken to merge with Leeds Girls' High School in 2003. The school passed out of existence on 4 July 2008, although it had been legally dissolved since August 2005.

== Houses ==
Leeds Grammar School has eight houses, named after individuals connected with the school or its formation. This system dates back to 1924, with the original school houses being Clarell, Sheafield, Neville and Thoresby. Currently there are eight houses:

- Barry – after Rev. Alfred Barry, who planned the move of Leeds Grammar School to its site in Woodhouse Moor, which it occupied between 1859 and 1997.
- Clarell – after Thomas Clarell, Vicar of Leeds from 1430 to 1469, and founder of the Clarell Chantry, in which was employed William Sheafield as chantry priest.
- Ermystead – after William Ermystead, who paid for the construction of the Lady Lane site in the 1590s.
- Harrison – after John Harrison, benefactor of Leeds, who built the school its third site on North Street.
- Lawson – after Godfrey Lawson, Mayor of Leeds, who endowed to the school the Lawson Library – the oldest library in Leeds.
- Nevile – for Sir John Nevil of Birstall- one of the first trustees of the school.
- Sheafield – after William Sheafield, who is traditionally thought of as the founder of the school in 1552, by virtue of the date of signature of his will, which endowed the school.
- Thoresby – after Ralph Thoresby, topographer of Leeds and alumnus of the school.

There are many competitions throughout the school year, the most notable of these being Sports day and House music. Any house activity, be it a win or a draw, results in the acquiring of House Points. All eight houses compete throughout the year for the coveted Bailey Cup – awarded at the end of the year for the house with the most House Points.

Following the merger with Leeds Girls High School four of these houses (Thoresby, Neville, Clarell and Barry) were removed. Four houses have been created from alumnae important to Leeds Girls High School (Eddison, Ford, Lupton and Powell) thereby maintaining the current eight-house system at GSAL.

== Merger with Leeds Girls' High School ==
The school administration merged with Leeds Girls' High School in August 2005, and the two schools physically merged in September 2008. At that time the Senior School (ages 11–18) and Junior School (ages 7–11) will remain at their present Alwoodley Site. The Infant School will move to the former LGHS site at Headingley alongside a new Nursery School. The merged school will be called The Grammar School at Leeds. The main Senior School site of Leeds Girls' High School will be sold to a private developer. Classes for girls and boys between the ages of 11 and 16 will remain segregated, but all extracurricular activities will be mixed.

The merger of the two schools has caused some controversy due to the expected increase in traffic levels at the Alwoodley site.

== Headmasters ==
In 2005 the school merged with Leeds Girls High School to form the Grammar School at Leeds
- 1999–2005: Dr Mark Bailey (continued with GSAL until 2010)
- 1986–1999: Bryan Collins
- 1976–1986: Anthony Verity
- 1975–1976: Maurice Hare (acting head)
- 1970–1975: Alan Aldous
- 1963–1970: E. E. Sabben-Clare
- 1962−1963: F. N. Hoggett (Acting Head)
- 1953–1962: T. G. C. Woodford
- 1923–1953: Dr Terry Thomas
- 1902–1922: Rev Canon J. R. Wynne-Evans
- 1884–1902: Rev John Henry Dudley Matthews
- 1862–1884: Rev Dr William George Henderson
- 1854–1862: Rev Dr Alfred Barry
- 1830–1854: Dr Joseph Holmes
- 1818–1830: George Walker
- 1813–1818: George Pierce Richards
- 1789–1813: Joseph Whiteley
- 1778–1789: Thomas Goodinge
- 1764–1778: Samuel Brooke
- 1755–1764: John Moore
- 1750–1755: Richard Sedgwick
- 1712–1750: Thomas Barnard
- 1706–1712: Thomas Dixon
- 1698–1706: Thomas Dwyer
- 1694–1698: Rev Miles Farrar
- 1690–1694: Edward Clark
- 1662–1690: Michael Gilbert
- 1651–1662: John Garnett
- 1631–1651: Joshua Pullen
- 1624–1630: Samuel Pullen

== Notable alumni ==
- Thomas Adam (1701–1784) – Church of England clergyman and religious writer.
- Thomas T Adamson-Coumbousis – Channel 4 News, TV Reporter/Producer
- Thomas Barnard, clergyman
- Arthur Bayldon, poet
- Beau (born 1946) – folk singer (Trevor Midgley)
- Irwin Bellow, Baron Bellwin (1923–2001) – Conservative minister
- Gordon Benson (born 1994) – triathlete for Great Britain
- John Berkenhout (1726–91) – English physician, naturalist and miscellaneous writer
- Tim Birkhead (born 1950) professor of behaviour and evolution
- Ian Black, journalist and author
- Robin Blaze – countertenor
- Jon Blundy (born 1961) – geologist, Professor of Petrology at University of Bristol
- Richard Boon, manager of Buzzcocks and the New Hormones record label
- Albert Braithwaite, Conservative M.P.
- William Henry Brookfield (1809–74) – Inspector of Schools, and chaplain-in-ordinary to Queen Victoria.
- William Arthur Brown (born 1945) – Master of Darwin College, Cambridge
- Jeff Christie Pop singer Yellow River 1970 No.1 in the Charts
- Charles West Cope (1811–1890) Victorian era painter of genre and history scenes
- Keith Cox (1933–1998) geologist and academic at the University of Oxford
- Robert Crosthwaite (1837–1925) inaugural Bishop of Beverley
- Geoffrey Crowther, Baron Crowther (1907–1972) – economist, editor of The Economist
- Barry Cryer (1935–2022) – Comedian and comedy writer
- Alan Davidson – author, diplomat, food writer
- Howard Devoto – ex-lead singer of Buzzcocks, Magazine and Luxuria
- Lord "Jack" Diamond (John Diamond) (1907–2004) – Politician, Member of parliament, and leader of the Social Democratic Party in the House of Lords
- George Dixon – MP for Birmingham, also Edgbaston. Educationalist
- Jeremy Dyson – scriptwriter especially for The League of Gentlemen
- Lord John Dyson b.1943 Master of The Rolls 2012 – 2016
- Matthew Elliott – CEO of Vote Leave
- Ralph Emmerson (1913–2008) – Bishop of Knaresborough from 1972 to 1979
- Ernest Farrar (1885–1918) – composer
- James Fawcett – Norrisian Professor of Divinity at the University of Cambridge
- Robin Flower (1881–1946) – poet
- John Freeborn (born 1919) – Battle of Britain RAF pilot
- Mike Hann (born 1937) – Wimbledon Junior Champion 1955. Wing Commander RAF
- Richard Harrington, Baron Harrington of Watford (born 1957) – MP for Watford, 2010 – 2019, Member of the House of Lords, 2022 – Present
- Tony Harrison (1937–2025) – poet
- Sir John Hawkshaw (1811–91) – Engineer (railways, canals, tunnels)
- George Henderson (1854–1903) – British soldier and military historian most famous for his work regarding the American Civil War and Stonewall Jackson
- Henry Bendelack Hewetson (1850–1899) – ophthalmologist and naturalist
- Sir Jack Hibbert – director of the Central Statistical Office, 1985–92.
- Ken Hodcroft – Chairman of Hartlepool United F.C.
- George Edward Holderness – eminent Anglican priest in the second half of the 20th century
- Arthur Michael Hollis – eminent Anglican clergyman in the mid 20th century
- Peter Matthew Hutton (born 1966) – Sports media executive and former commentator
- John Ireland (1879–1962) – composer
- Samuel Waite Johnson (1831–1912) – mechanical engineer
- Donald Kaberry, Baron Kaberry of Adel (1907–91) – politician, Member of Parliament for Leeds North West
- Sir Gerald Kaufman (1930–2017) – Member of Parliament
- Reverend Geoffrey Studdert Kennedy (1883–1929) – priest and counsellor in World War I, nicknamed "Woodbine Willie"
- Nichol Latimer (1830 - 1865), publisher of The North China Herald which was the most influential newspaper in China
- Theophilus Lindsey, Vicar of Catterick
- Frank Marsh (1936–2011) – consultant nephrologist
- William Ryott Maughan (1863–1933) – English-born Australian politician
- Alston James Weller May – 2nd Bishop of Northern Rhodesia
- Stanley Metcalfe (1932–2017) – cricketer
- Isaac Milner, Dean of Carlisle and Master of Queens, Cambridge
- Joseph Milner (1744–97) – English evangelical divine and Headmaster
- Colin Montgomerie (born 1963) – Golf Professional
- Patrick Munro (1883–1942) Conservative M.P. and international rugby union player
- William Nicholson, 1st Baron Nicholson (1845–1918) – Field Marshal
- Richard Peacock (1820–89) – Engineer; railway locomotive designer
- Christopher Price – Labour MP
- Joseph Proctor (academic) Master of Catherine Hall
- Joseph Bancroft Reade (1801–70) – Clergyman, amateur scientist and pioneer of photography
- James Buchanan Seaton Archdeacon of Johannesburg and later Bishop of Wakefield
- Sydney Selwyn (1934–1996), British physician, medical scientist and notable expert in the history of medicine
- Christopher Serpell (1910–91) - BBC Diplomatic Correspondent Father was Senior Master
- Guy Sigsworth – electronica producer and was member of the band Frou Frou
- John Smeaton (1724–94) – civil and mechanical engineer famous for building the third Eddystone Lighthouse, and for many other engineering projects
- Barnett Stross (1899–1967) – doctor and politician
- Dave Syers (born 1987) – Professional footballer for Bradford City
- Godfrey Talbot – war-time BBC correspondent; later the BBC's first officially-accredited royal correspondent
- Thomas Pridgin Teale – surgeon and ophthalmologist
- Ralph Thoresby (1658–1724) – Merchant, dissenter, and author of the first history of Leeds, Ducatus Leodiensis, in 1715
- John Rowe Townsend – children's writer
- Gary Verity – Farmer, Deputy Lord Lieutenant of West Yorkshire and Tour de Yorkshire promoter
- Lawrence Wager (1904–65) – geologist, explorer and mountaineer
- David Warburton (1919–1941) – cricketer
- Nigel Waterson (born 1950) – Member of Parliament for Eastbourne
- Philip Wilby (born 1949) – composer
- Christopher Wilson – Bishop of Bristol
- Ricky Wilson – lead singer of the Kaiser Chiefs
- Olly Cracknell – Rugby player for Wales and Ospreys
- Mark Kielesz-Levine (born 1985) – Television Journalist and Presenter
- V. C. Wynne-Edwards (1906–1997) – Naturalist and evolutionary biologist, notably for early support of group selection

== Notable teachers ==
- Alfred Barry (1826–1910) – Headmaster from 1854 to 1862; later the third Bishop of Sydney, 1884–89
- Joanne Harris – Author of Chocolat, Gentlemen & Players (Imaginary school based partly on Leeds Grammar School), et al.
- Cyril Norwood – Classics master, later Headmaster of Harrow School
- Samuel Pullen (1598–1667), first master, under the second endowment of the school, and later Church of Ireland Archbishop of Tuam.
- Richard Vickerman Taylor (born 1830) – Assistant master, later priest and historian
- Anthony Verity – Headmaster from 1976 to 1986, went on to head Dulwich College

== See also ==
- Listed buildings in Leeds (Hyde Park and Woodhouse)
