= Ronald Milner =

Bishop of Burnley (born 1927)

The Rt Revd Ronald Milner MA(Cantab)
- Bishop of Burnley
- Diocese: Diocese of Blackburn
- In office: 1988–1993
- Predecessor: Richard Watson
- Successor: Martyn Jarrett
- Other posts: Honorary assistant bishop in Southwell (since 1994); Archdeacon of Lincoln (1983–1988)

Orders
- Ordination: 1953 (deacon); 1954 (priest)
- Consecration: 1988

Personal details
- Born: 16 May 1927 (age 99)
- Denomination: Anglican
- Parents: Maurice & Muriel
- Spouse: Audrey Howard (m. 1950)
- Children: 2 sons; 3 daughters (1 d.)
- Education: Pembroke College, Cambridge

Ronald James Milner (born 16 May 1927) is an English Anglican clergyman who was the Bishop of Burnley from 1988 to 1993.

== Biography ==
Milner was born on 16 May 1927. He was educated at Hull Grammar School and Pembroke College, Cambridge before embarking on an ecclesiastical career with the post of Succentor at Sheffield Cathedral, after which he was Vicar of Westwood . He then became Vicar of St James Fletchampstead. Following this he was Rector of St Mary's, Southampton and then (his final appointment before ordination to the episcopate) Archdeacon of Lincoln. In retirement he continues to serve as an assistant bishop within the Diocese of Southwell and Nottingham.

Church of England titles
Preceded by Richard Watson	Bishop of Burnley; 1988–1993	Succeeded by Martyn Jarrett
