= Keith Prosser =

English Anglican bishop (1897–1954)

Rt Rev Charles Keith Kipling Prosser (27 March 1897 – 27 June 1954) was an Anglican clergyman who was the fifth Bishop of Burnley from 1950 until 1954.

Born in Coleshill, Warwickshire, he was the son of grocer Charles Richard Prosser and Annie May Cox, daughter of Rev. William Kipling Cox.

Educated at King Edward's School, Birmingham, he served during World War I with the Royal Garrison Artillery. He joined as a private in 1916 and was demobilised as a lieutenant in 1920 having earned a mention in despatches. He had a motorcycle accident in France in May, 1918, which led to hospitalisation. He served in 99 Siege Battery which suffered heavy casualties in June, 1918, when he was still recovering. Later that year, he caught Spanish flu and measles, and it was not until March, 1919 that he was fully fit.

After the war, he studied at Queens' College, Cambridge before ordination in 1923. Successively curate of Bishop Latimer's Church, Birmingham, rector of Alert Bay, British Columbia and rural dean of Leigh, he was ordained to the episcopate in 1950. He died in post four years later.

Church of England titles
Preceded by Edgar Priestley Swain	Bishop of Burnley; 1950 – 1954	Succeeded by George Edward Holderness
