= David Warburton (cricketer) =

English cricketer (1919–1941)

Personal information
- Full name: David Warburton
- Born: 30 May 1919; Huddersfield, Yorkshire, England
- Died: 4 February 1941 (aged 21); Crewe, Cheshire, England
- Batting: Right-handed
- Bowling: Right-arm fast

Domestic team information
- Years: Team
- 1939: Oxford University

Career statistics
Competition	First-class
Matches	1
Runs scored	4
Batting average	2.00
100s/50s	–/–
Top score	4
Balls bowled	64
Wickets	0
Bowling average	–
5 wickets in innings	–
10 wickets in match	–
Best bowling	–
Catches/stumpings	–/–
- Source: Cricinfo, 7 June 2020

David Warburton (30 May 1919 – 4 February 1941) was an English first-class cricketer and Royal Air Force Volunteer Reserve officer.

The son of The Reverend Robert Warburton, he was born at Huddersfield in May 1919. He was educated at Leeds Grammar School, before going up to Brasenose College, Oxford in 1938. While studying at Oxford, he made a single appearance in first-class cricket for Oxford University against Gloucestershire at Oxford in 1939. Batting twice in the match, he was dismissed for 4 runs in the Oxford first-innings by Tom Goddard, while in their second innings he was dismissed without scoring by the same bowler. With his right-arm fast bowling, he bowled a total of eight overs without taking a wicket. Due to the slow nature of the wickets at the start of the cricket season, he was not afforded further opportunities and this was to be Warburton's only first-class appearance for Oxford.

The start of the Second World War in September 1939 meant that just two weeks after returning to Oxford after the summer term, Warburton found himself in the Royal Air Force Volunteer Reserve, initially holding the rank of sergeant before being commissioned as a flying officer. He was promoted to flying officer in September 1940. After completing his training he helped to train Polish pilots of the Polish Air Force. On 4 February 1941, Warburton was flying a Wellington bomber from No. 18 Operational Training Unit on a training mission with a mixture of Polish and British aircrew. While flying over Crewe, the bomber was hit by friendly fire from a Home Guard anti aircraft unit near the Rolls-Royce factory and subsequently collided with a barrage balloon, crashing and killing all on board. He was buried at West Knoyle in Wiltshire, near to the family home at Mere.
