= Richard Vickerman Taylor =

English priest and historian (1830–1914)

Richard Vickerman Taylor (1830–1914) was an English schoolteacher and clergyman; and a biographer of Leeds worthies, and author on Yorkshire topics.

== Biography ==
Richard Vickerman Taylor was born in Leeds, Yorkshire, on 10 October 1830, the eldest son of John Taylor and his wife Ann Vickerman. He was educated from the age of eleven at Leeds Grammar School.

Taylor held a variety of teaching jobs; in 1851 in Rawdon for six months, before in the same year returning to Leeds Grammar School as an Assistant Master for two and a half years. In 1854 he moved to the Classical and Commercial school in Queen Square, Leeds. For the first six months of 1855 he taught at Somerset House, Kingsdown, Bristol. In the same year he passed exams at the College of Preceptors and matriculation exams for London University, moving to the capital and teaching in Blackheath whilst attending lectures at University College, London. In July 1856 he became Senior Classical Master at Bramham College, Tadcaster; and two years later he moved to the same position at Wesley College, Sheffield. While there he gained a B.A. degree from King's College London. In 1861 he was appointed Classical Tutor at Ripponden College near Halifax.

In 1863 he was ordained deacon, taking his priest's orders the following year. He held a number of curacies, including St Barnabas, Holbeck, Wortley, Brightside near Sheffield and Edlington. In 1878 he became Vicar of Melbecks, Swaledale.

A Fellow of the Royal Horticultural Society and a member of the Yorkshire Archaeological and Topographical Association, he also published and contributed to publications on the history of Yorkshire.

He was married twice, first, in 1860, to Caroline Franks; after her death in 1888, he married Elizabeth Ann Knowles in 1889. He died at the age of 83 years, on 8 July 1914, at his home, The Mount, Low Row, Swaledale.

== Publications ==
All listed in the British Library Public Catalogue:

- SAYWELL. Joseph Lemuel The Parochial History of Ackworth, Yorks., with archæological, antiquarian, and biographical notes & records (With an introduction by R. V. Taylor) James Atkinson & Son, Pontefract; Simpkin, Marshall & Co.: London, 1894.
- Anecdotæ Eboracenses. Yorkshire Anecdotes; or, remarkable incidents in the lives of celebrated Yorkshire men and women, etc. Whittaker & Co.: London, 1883.
- Anecdota Eboracensia. Yorkshire anecdotes, etc. (Second series) Whittaker & Co.: London, 1887.
- The Biographia Leodiensis; or, Biographical Sketches of the Worthies of Leeds and neighbourhood, from the Norman Conquest to the present time, etc. London, 1865.
- Supplement to The Biographia Leodiensis; or, Biographical Sketches of the Worthies of Leeds and neighbourhood, from the Norman Conquest to the present time, etc. London, 1867.
- The Ecclesiæ Leodienses; or, Historical and Architectural Sketches of the Churches of Leeds and neighbourhood, etc. London, 1875.
