= Godfrey Talbot =

English broadcast journalist (1908–2000)

Godfrey Talbot OBE LVO
- Born: Godfrey Walker Talbot; 8 October 1908; Walton, West Riding of Yorkshire, England
- Died: 2 September 2000 (aged 91); London, England
- Education: Leeds Grammar School
- Occupations: Journalist; Radio Broadcaster
- Years active: 1928 – 1969; 1973
- Spouse: Bess Owen (m. 1933; died 1998)
- Children: 2

Godfrey Walker Talbot OBE LVO (8 October 1908 – 2 September 2000) was an English broadcast journalist. After an early career in print journalism, his time as a BBC Radio journalist included periods as a war reporter and royal correspondent. He was the first officially accredited court correspondent at Buckingham Palace.

== Life ==
Talbot was born on 8 October 1908 at Walton, near Wakefield, Yorkshire, and he was educated at Leeds Grammar School. He joined the Yorkshire Post at the age of 20. Four years later, he was editor of the Manchester City News, then worked at the Daily Dispatch, before joining the BBC in 1937.

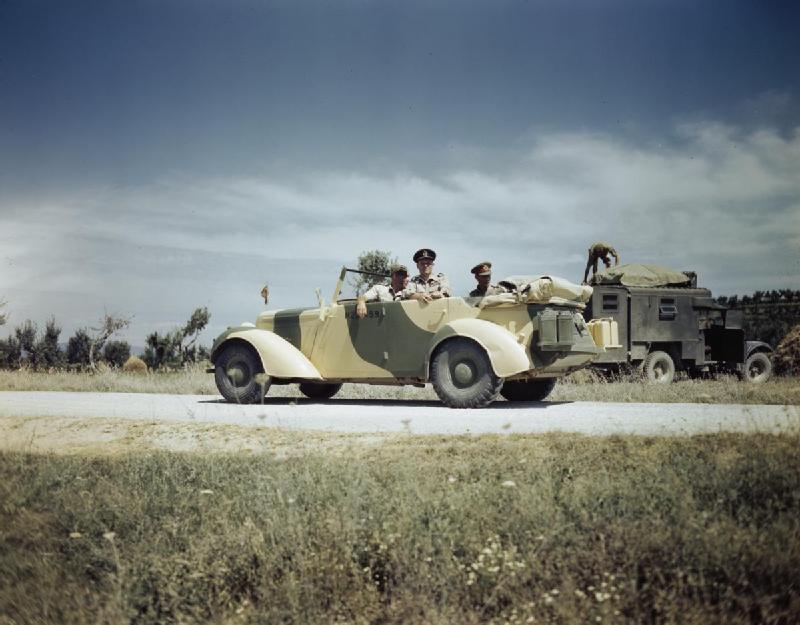
Imperial War Museum photograph 26 July 1944 in Italy. Caption reads "HM King George VI watches a squadron of British fighters take off on a mission from a Humber staff car. In the background the BBC reporter, Godfrey Talbot is preparing his van for recording the occasion"

During World War II, having been sent to replace Richard Dimbleby, he reported on North African battles such as Al Alamein and Cassino, for which he was mentioned in despatches and, in 1946, made a military Officer of the Order of the British Empire (OBE).

He appeared as a castaway on the BBC Radio programme Desert Island Discs on 29 August 1960. In the same year, he was appointed a Member of the Royal Victorian Order. He published two volumes of autobiography.

He died peacefully at home on 3 September 2000. He and his wife Bess Owen had two sons; she and one of them pre-deceased him.

== Bibliography ==
- —— (1944). Speaking from the desert; a record of the Eighth Army in Africa. OCLC 499983146.
- ——. Ten Seconds From Now. OCLC 153317112. (autobiography)
- ——. Permission to Speak. OCLC 463281404. (autobiography)
- —— (1978). The Country Life Book of Queen Elizabeth the Queen Mother. Country Life Books. ISBN 978-0-600-38772-5.
- ——. Our royal heritage.
- ——. Royalty annual.
- —— (1981). The Country life book of the Royal Family.
