= Frank Marsh (nephrologist) =

British nephrologist and academic administrator

Frank Marsh FRCP
- Born: 5 April 1936; Birmingham, Warwickshire, England
- Died: 16 January 2011 (aged 74)
- Education: Leeds Grammar School
- Alma mater: Gonville and Caius College
- Occupation: Nephrologist

Dr Francis Patrick Marsh FRCP (1936–2011), known as Frank, was a British nephrologist and academic administrator.

Marsh was born in Birmingham, England, on 5 April 1936, to Violet and Horatio Septimus Marsh, the latter an office manager. While he was still a child, his family moved to Leeds, and he was educated at Leeds Grammar School. During this time, he was lead violinist with the National Youth Orchestra.

He studied natural sciences at Gonville and Caius College, University of Cambridge, graduating in 1957. He qualified in medicine and surgery in 1960. He subsequently worked in hospitals in London, Kent and Canterbury, and at the Royal Free Hospital.

In 1971, he obtained a post as consultant physician, nephrologist and senior lecturer in medicine at London Hospital Medical College, rising to be dean of medical studies and a member of the council of governors there from 1990 to 1995). He was also chair of the board of the American University of the Caribbean from 2007 until 2010.

He also served as chair of the North East Thames regional medical advisory committee from 1986 to 1990); a member of the joint formulary committee of the British National Formulary from 1986 to 2008; a member of the executive committee of the Renal Association.

He was elected a Fellow of the Royal College of Physicians (FRCP) in 1976.

He died on 16 January 2011.
