= Stephen Race (bishop) =

British Anglican bishop

The Right Reverend Stephen Race SSC
- Bishop of Beverley (PEV)
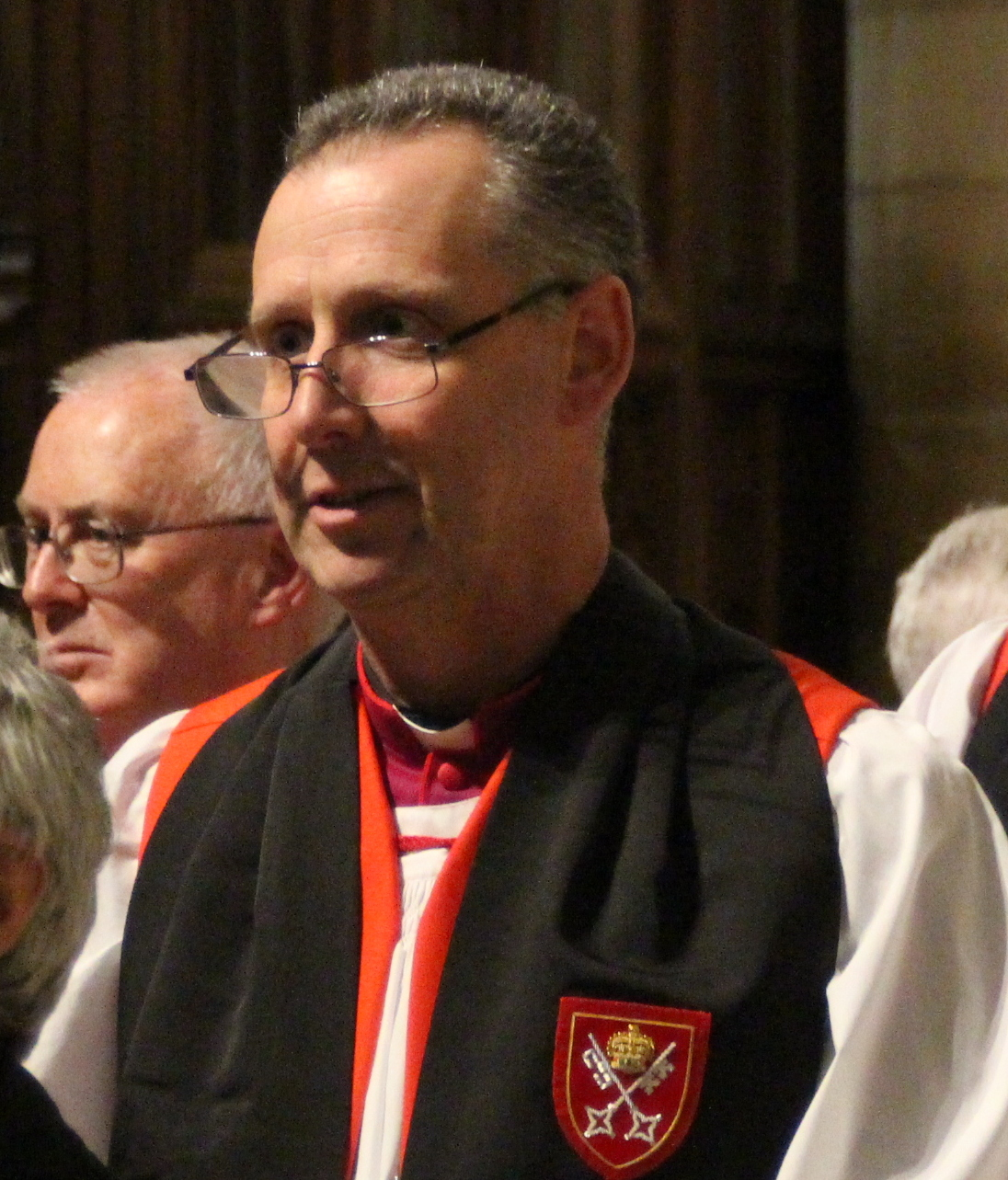
- Race in 2024
- Church: Church of England
- Diocese: Diocese of York
- In office: 2022 to present
- Predecessor: Glyn Webster

Orders
- Ordination: 2002 (deacon); 2003 (priest)
- Consecration: 30 November 2022 by Tony Robinson

Personal details
- Born: 1969 (age 56–57)
- Denomination: Anglicanism
- Education: College of St Hild and St Bede, Durham; St Stephen's House, Oxford

Stephen Peter Race SSC (born 1969) is a British Anglican bishop. Since 2022, he has been the Bishop of Beverley, the Provincial Episcopal Visitor for traditionalist Anglo-Catholics in the Church of England's Province of York.

== Early life and education ==
Race was born in 1969, and raised in Zimbabwe. He studied at the College of St Hild and St Bede, Durham, graduating from Durham University with a Bachelor of Arts (BA) degree in 1993. He then qualified as a teacher.

== Ordained ministry ==
Race trained for Holy Orders at St Stephen's House, Oxford. He was ordained in the Church of England as a deacon in 2002 and as a priest in 2003. From 2002 to 2005, he served his curacy at St Mary's Parish Church, Wigton, in the Diocese of Carlisle. In 2005, he was appointed vicar of the Church of St John the Baptist, Dodworth, in the Diocese of Wakefield. He was additionally assistant diocesan director of ordinands from 2005 and then diocesan director of ordinands from 2009. He was made area dean of Barnsley in 2009 and an honorary canon of Wakefield Cathedral in 2011. In 2014, he moved parishes and became priest-in-charge of St Mary's Church, Barnsley in the newly created Diocese of Leeds. He additionally became priest-in-charge of the Church of St Edward the Confessor, Barnsley and St Thomas' Church, Gawber in 2017. In 2018, he became Rector of Central Barnsley, a newly created benefice consisting of the three churches he led. St George's Church, Barnsley, was added to the benefice in 2018.

=== Episcopal ministry ===
On 12 October 2022, he was announced as the next Bishop of Beverley, in succession to Glyn Webster. The Bishop of Beverley provides alternative episcopal oversight to traditionalist Anglo-Catholic parishes in the Province of York that reject the ordination of women as priests and bishops. On 30 November 2022, he was consecrated a bishop during a service at York Minster: the principal consecrator was Tony Robinson, assisted by Philip North and Glyn Webster. In addition, he was made an honorary assistant bishop of the Diocese of Sheffield in 2023, and an assistant bishop of the Diocese of Liverpool and of the Diocese of Sodor and Man in 2023.

=== Views ===
He voted against introducing "standalone services for same-sex couples" on a trial basis during a meeting of the General Synod in November 2023; the motion passed.
