= Robert Crosthwaite =

Bishop of Beverley

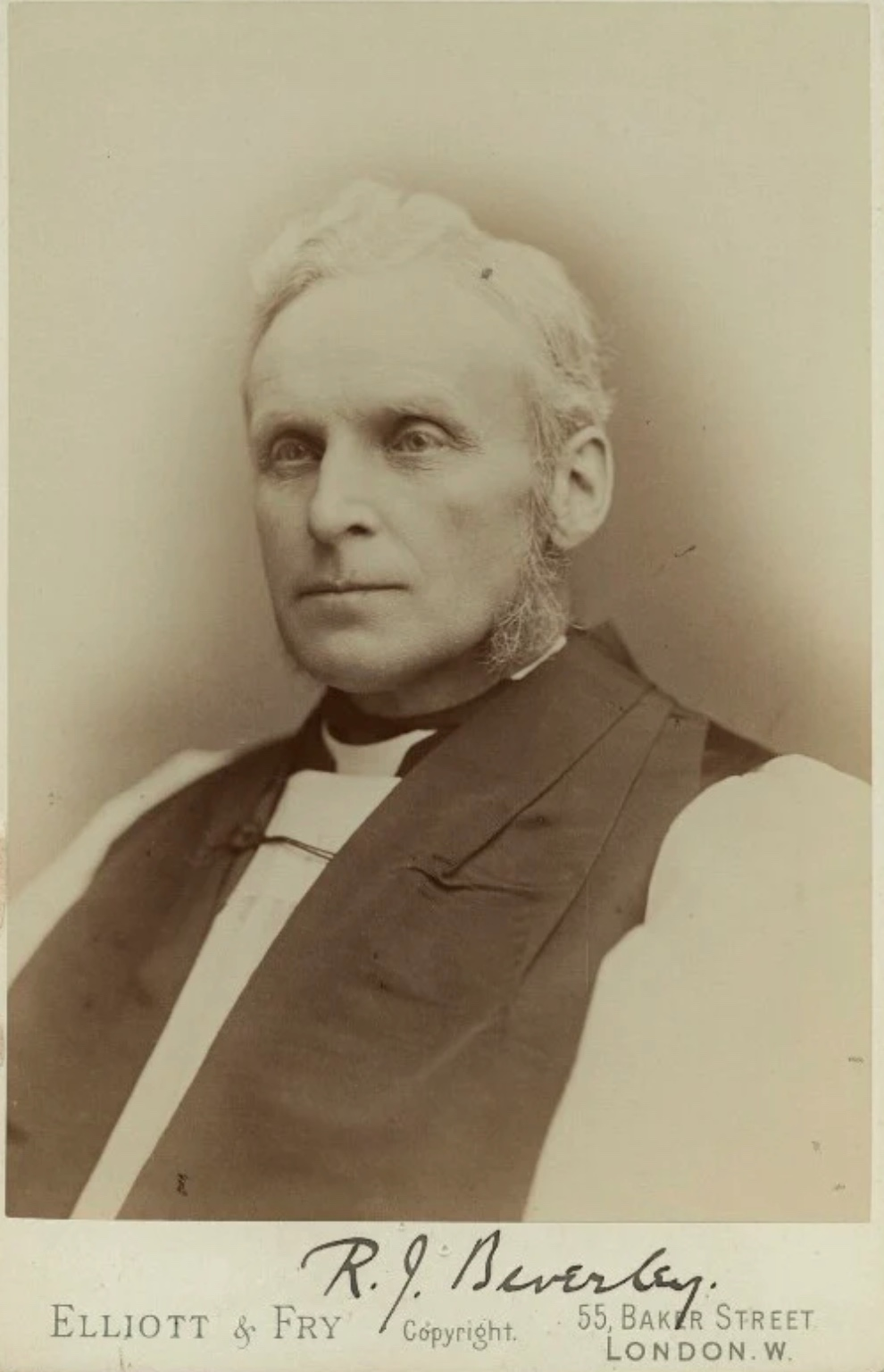
Robert Jarratt Crosthwaite, first Bishop of Beverley, 1870s

Robert Jarratt Crosthwaite (13 October 1837, Wellington, Somerset – 9 September 1925, Bolton Percy) was the inaugural Bishop of Beverley in the late nineteenth and early twentieth centuries.

Born in Wellington, Somerset, on 13 October 1837, Robert Crosthwaite was the son of Benjamin Crosthwaite, priest and canon. He was educated at Leeds Grammar School and Trinity College, Cambridge. Ordained in 1862, he began his career with a curacy at North Cave after which he was Domestic Chaplain to the Archbishop of York. Following incumbencies in Brayton and St Lawrence's Church, York, he was Rector of Bolton Percy (1885–1923). Crosthwaite was appointed Archdeacon of York in 1884.

In 1889, Crosthwaite was appointed suffragan bishop within the Diocese of York and served until 1923. He was consecrated a bishop by William Thomson, Archbishop of York, at York Minster. He became a Doctor of Divinity; and died on 9 September 1925 at Bolton Percy.
