= Bishop of Beverley =

Suffragan bishop of the Church of England

The Bishop of Beverley is a suffragan bishop and Provincial Episcopal Visitor for part of the Province of York in the Church of England. The title takes its name after the town of Beverley in the East Riding of Yorkshire, England. Since 2022, Stephen Race has served as Bishop of Beverley.

Originally a suffragan bishop in the Diocese of York, the bishop's role was to assist the Archbishop of York in overseeing the Diocese of York, but after 1923 the position fell into abeyance. The See was revived under the Suffragans Nomination Act 1888 by Order in Council dated 8 February 1994, as a Provincial Episcopal Visitor for the Province of York. The bishop has responsibility for those parishes in 9 dioceses of the province who do not accept the sacramental ministry of bishops who have participated in the ordination of women. As of 2014, three of the twelve dioceses in the northern province provide a different suffragan bishop to such parishes in their diocese: in the Diocese of Leeds this is the Bishop of Wakefield, and in Blackburn and Carlisle the Bishop of Burnley.

The See was vacant since Bishop Glyn Webster's retirement; in the vacancy, the Bishop suffragan of Burnley had undertaken duties in the west of the province and the area Bishop of Wakefield in the east. In October 2022, it was announced that Stephen Peter Race would be the next Bishop of Beverley: his consecration took place on 30 November 2022 at York Minster.

== List of bishops ==
Bishops of Beverley
| From | Until | Incumbent | Notes |
|---|---|---|---|
| 1889 | 1923 | Robert Crosthwaite | |
| 1923 | 1994 | in abeyance | |
| 7 March 1994 | 2000 | John Gaisford SSC | |
| 2000 | 2012 | Martyn Jarrett SSC | Formerly Bishop of Burnley |
| 25 January 2013 | 2022 | Glyn Webster | Formerly Canon Chancellor at York Minster; retired 6 January 2022 |
| 2022 | present | Stephen Race SSC | Consecrated 30 November 2022 |

== See also ==
- Bishop of Ebbsfleet
- Bishop of Fulham
- Bishop of Richborough
- List of Anglo-Catholic churches in England
