= Dean of Newcastle =

Head of Newcastle Cathedral

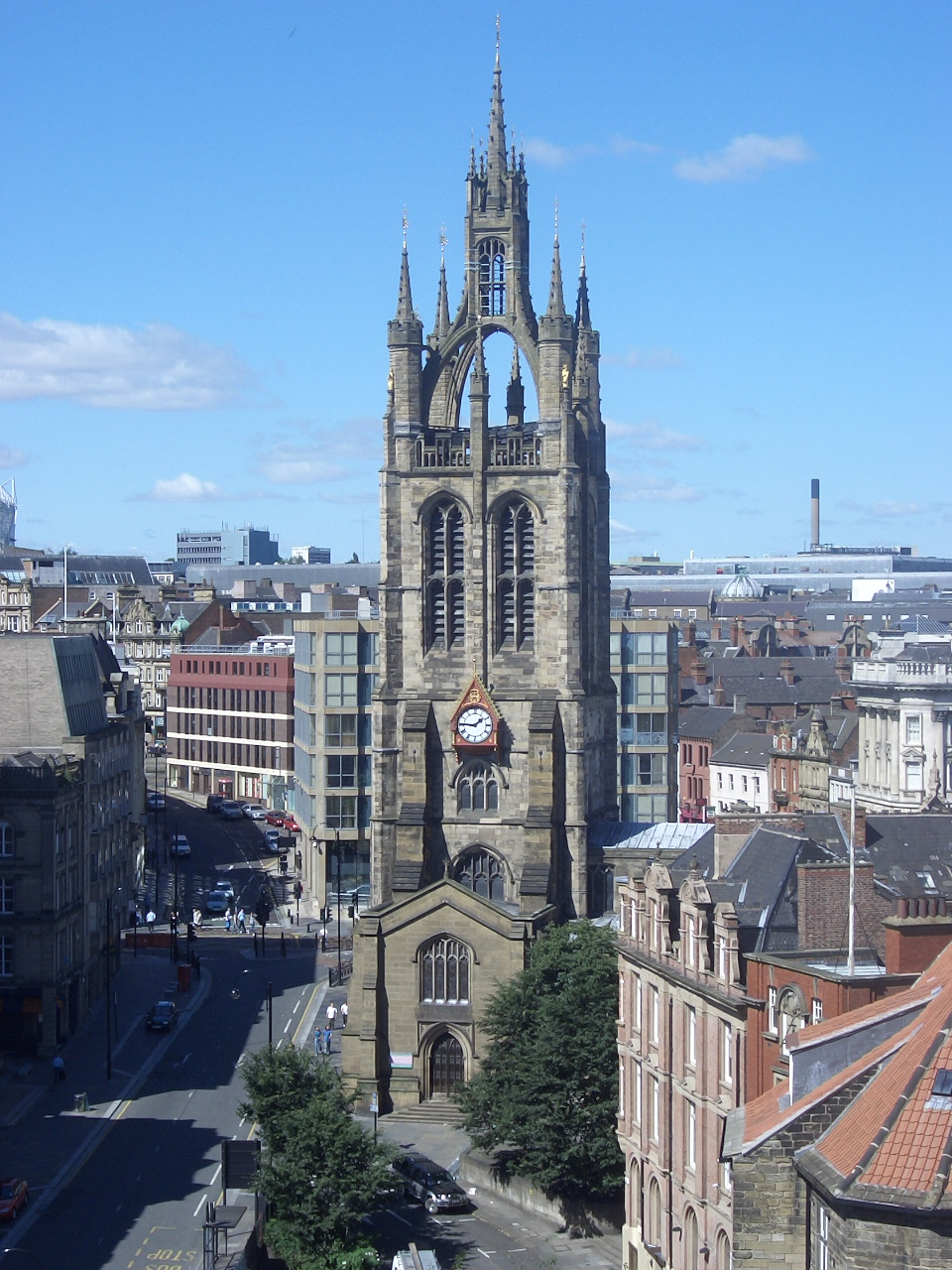
Newcastle Cathedral

The Dean of Newcastle is the head (primus inter pares – first among equals) and chair of the chapter of canons, the ruling body of Newcastle Cathedral. The dean and chapter are based at the Cathedral Church of Saint Nicholas, Newcastle upon Tyne. Before 2000 the post was designated as a provost, which since 1931 had been the equivalent of a dean at English cathedrals which had been parish churches. The cathedral is the mother church of the Diocese of Newcastle and seat of the Bishop of Newcastle.

== List of deans ==
=== Provosts ===
- 1931–1938 John Bateman-Champain
- 1938–1947 George Brigstocke
- 1947–1962 Noel Kennaby
- 1962–1976 Clifton Wolters
- 1976–1989 Christopher Spafford
- 1990–2001 Nicholas Coulton (became Dean)

=== Deans ===
- 2001–2003 Nicholas Coulton
- 2003–2018 Chris Dalliston
- 2018−2022 Geoff Miller
- 2023−present: Lee Batson
