= List of deans in the Church of England =

Key
Active dean	Male dean
Inactive dean	Female dean
Position vacant	

The deans in the Church of England are the senior Anglican clergy who head the chapter of a collegiate church (almost all of which are cathedrals). If they are dean of the diocesan chapter, they are the senior priest of the diocese and often also undertake some other diocesan and civic duties in the area. As of 4 August 2024, there are 46 deans (including vacancies): 44 of cathedrals plus the two royal peculiars.

== Deans ==
Church	Dean	Person	Date of birth and age	Instituted (Note: The date the person first became a dean.)
Canterbury Cathedral	The Dean of Canterbury	David Monteith	5 June 1968 (age 58)	18 May 2013 (Leicester); 17 December 2022 (Canterbury)
St George's Chapel, Windsor Castle	The Dean of Windsor	Christopher Cocksworth	12 January 1959 (age 67)	6 November 2023
Lichfield Cathedral	The Dean of Lichfield, honorary assistant bishop	Jan McFarlane	25 November 1964 (age 61)	21 September 2024
Peterborough Cathedral	The Dean of Peterborough	Chris Dalliston	2 April 1956 (age 70)	12 July 2003 (Newcastle); 20 January 2018 (Peterborough)
Manchester Cathedral	The Dean of Manchester	Rogers Govender	27 June 1960 (age 66)	14 January 2006
Exeter Cathedral	The Dean of Exeter	Jonathan Greener	9 March 1961 (age 65)	8 December 2007 (Wakefield); 26 November 2017 (Exeter)
Westminster Abbey	The Dean of Westminster	David Hoyle	1957 (age 68–69)	29 May 2010 (Bristol); 16 November 2019 (Westminster)
Peel Cathedral	The Dean of Peel	Nigel Godfrey	25 April 1951 (age 75)	15 October 2011
Ely Cathedral	The Dean of Ely	Mark Bonney	2 March 1957 (age 69)	22 September 2012
Coventry Cathedral	The Dean of Coventry	John Witcombe (Note: Witcombe has announced his intention to retire effective 31 May 2026.)	1 March 1959 (age 67)	19 January 2013
Ripon Cathedral (Note: When the Diocese of Leeds was formed on 20 April 2014, the cathedrals at Bradford, Ripon and Wakefield became part of that diocese; each (acting) dean remained (acting) dean of their respective cathedral. The reorganisation scheme created the position of "presiding dean of the diocesan chapter" and senior priest of the new diocese, but that role has never been referred to since.)	The Dean of Ripon	John Dobson	16 November 1964 (age 61)	14 June 2014
York Minster	The Dean of York	Dominic Barrington	1962 (age 63–64)	13 September 2015 (Chicago); 12 November 2022 (York)
Rochester Cathedral	The Dean of Rochester	Philip Hesketh	15 November 1964 (age 61)	19 June 2016
St Paul's Cathedral, London	The Dean of St Paul's	Andrew Tremlett	9 March 1964 (age 62)	17 July 2016 (Durham); 25 September 2022 (St Paul's)
Southwell Minster	The Dean of Southwell	Nicola Sullivan	15 August 1958 (age 68)	17 September 2016
Blackburn Cathedral	The Dean of Blackburn	Peter Howell-Jones	1962 (age 63–64)	25 March 2017
Birmingham Cathedral	The Dean of Birmingham	Matt Thompson	1968 (age 57–58)	30 September 2017
Liverpool Cathedral	The Dean of Liverpool	Sue Jones	1960 (age 65–66)	5 May 2018
St Edmundsbury Cathedral	The Dean of St Edmundsbury	Joe Hawes	1965 (age 60–61)	14 July 2018
Chester Cathedral	The Dean of Chester	Tim Stratford	26 February 1961 (age 65)	8 September 2018
Salisbury Cathedral	The Dean of Salisbury	Nick Papadopulos	1966 (age 59–60)	9 September 2018
Portsmouth Cathedral	The Dean of Portsmouth	Anthony Cane	1961 (age 64–65)	16 March 2019
Derby Cathedral	The Dean of Derby	Peter Robinson	1961 (age 64–65)	20 July 2020
Bristol Cathedral	The Dean of Bristol	Mandy Ford	1961 (age 64–65)	3 October 2020
Cathedral of the Holy Trinity, Gibraltar	The Dean of Gibraltar	Ian Tarrant	1957 (age 68–69)	13 October 2020
Hereford Cathedral	The Dean of Hereford	Sarah Brown	withheld	2 October 2021
Sheffield Cathedral	The Dean of Sheffield	Abi Thompson	1975 (age 50–51)	6 November 2021
St Albans Cathedral	The Dean of St Albans	Jo Kelly-Moore	1968 (age 57–58)	4 December 2021
Bradford Cathedral	The Dean of Bradford	Andy Bowerman	1967 (age 58–59)	19 June 2022
Norwich Cathedral	The Dean of Norwich	Andrew Braddock	1971 (age 54–55)	28 January 2023
Gloucester Cathedral	The Dean of Gloucester	Andrew Zihni	1977 (age 48–49)	23 April 2023
Christ Church Cathedral, Oxford	The Dean of Christ Church	Sarah Foot	23 February 1961 (age 65)	8 July 2023
Durham Cathedral	The Dean of Durham	Philip Plyming	1974 (age 51–52)	16 September 2023
Carlisle Cathedral	The Dean of Carlisle	Jonathan Brewster	1967 (age 58–59)	30 September 2023
Newcastle Cathedral	The Dean of Newcastle	Lee Batson	1977 (age 48–49)	14 October 2023
Southwark Cathedral	The Dean of Southwark	Mark Oakley	1968 (age 57–58)	3 December 2023
Truro Cathedral	The Dean of Truro	Simon Robinson	1967 (age 58–59)	21 January 2024
Leicester Cathedral	The Dean of Leicester	Karen Rooms	1961 (age 64–65)	9 March 2024
Wells Cathedral	The Dean of Wells	Toby Wright	1975 (age 50–51)	16 June 2024
Lincoln Cathedral	The Dean of Lincoln	Simon Jones	1972 (age 53–54)	14 September 2024
Chichester Cathedral	The Dean of Chichester	Edward Dowler	1967 (age 58–59)	14 September 2024
Worcester Cathedral	The Dean of Worcester	Stephen Edwards	1972 (age 53–54)	15 September 2024
Chelmsford Cathedral	The Dean of Chelmsford	Jessica Martin	1963 (age 62–63)	5 January 2025
Guildford Cathedral	The Dean of Guildford	Bob Cooper	26 July 1968 (age 58)	26 January 2025
Winchester Cathedral	The Dean of Winchester	Vacant since 1 May 2025		
Wakefield Cathedral	The Dean of Wakefield	Vacant since 31 July 2025		

=== Interim deans ===
Under the Cathedrals Measure 2021, the bishop must appoint a canon residentiary as "interim dean" during a vacancy in the deanery.

== See also ==
- List of bishops in the Church of England
- List of archdeacons in the Church of England

== See also ==
- Anglican deans
