= Christopher Spafford =

Christopher Garnett Howsin Spafford (1924–2011) was Provost of Newcastle from 1976 to 1989.

Spafford was born into an ecclesiastical family on 10 September 1924, educated at Marlborough College and St John's College, Oxford and ordained in 1950. After curacies at Brighouse and Huddersfield he held incumbencies at Hebden Bridge, Thornhill and Shrewsbury. He was Provost of Newcastle Cathedral from 1976 to 1989.

Spafford died in September 2011.

Church of England titles
Preceded by Clifton Wolters	Provost of Newcastle; 1976 – 1989	Succeeded by Nicholas Coulton
