= Peter Moore (priest) =

Peter Clement Moore OBE (4 June 1924 – 16 June 2000) was an Anglican priest who was the Dean of St Albans from 1973 to 1993.

== Education and career ==
Moore was educated at Cheltenham College and Christ Church, Oxford. He was ordained in 1948 and was a minor canon at Canterbury Cathedral before becoming a curate at Bladon and then chaplain at New College, Oxford, vicar of Alfrick and rural dean of Pershore. His last position before his appointment to the deanery was as a canon residentiary and the sub-dean at Ely Cathedral.

== Writings ==
His writings include:

- Tomorrow is Too Late (1970)
- Man, Woman and Priesthood (1978)
- Footholds in the Faith (1980)
- The Synod of Westminster (1985)
- Sharing the Glory (1990)

== Private life ==
Moore was a senior Freemason under the United Grand Lodge of England. He had been initiated into Freemasonry in October 1950, and died four months short of completing 50 years membership. He held the rank of Past Grand Chaplain from 1981.

Church of England titles
Preceded by Noel Kennaby	Dean of St Albans; 1973–1993	Succeeded by Christopher Lewis
