= Samuel Hammond (disambiguation) =

Samuel Hammond (1757–1842) was an American Revolutionary War officer and U.S. Representative from Georgia.

Samuel Hammond may also refer to:

- Samuel H. Hammond (1809–1878), American lawyer, author, newspaper editor and politician from New York
- Samuel M. Hammond (1870–1934), American football coach and physician
- Samuel Hammond (minister) (died 1665), Church of England minister and nonconformist
- Samuel Hammond Jr. (1949–1968), American student killed in the 1968 Orangeburg massacre
