= Geoff Miller (priest) =

British priest (born 1956)

The Very Reverend Geoff Miller DL
- Dean of Newcastle
- Church: Church of England
- Diocese: Diocese of Newcastle
- In office: 2018 to 2022
- Predecessor: Chris Dalliston
- Successor: Lee Batson
- Previous post: Archdeacon of Northumberland (2005–2018)

Orders
- Ordination: 1983 (deacon); 1984 (priest)

Personal details
- Born: Geoffrey Vincent Miller; 26 January 1956 (age 70) Manchester, England
- Denomination: Anglicanism
- Education: University of Durham; St John's College, Nottingham

Geoffrey Vincent Miller DL (born 26 January 1956) is a British retired Church of England priest and former school teacher. He served as Dean of Newcastle, before which he had been the Archdeacon of Northumberland since 2005.

== Early life and education ==
Miller was born on 26 January 1956 in Manchester, England, to Harold and Vera Miller. He was educated at Sharston High School, a state school in Sharston, Manchester. He studied at the University of Durham, graduating with a Bachelor of Education (BEd) degree in 1977. He then worked as a teacher until he began training for ordained ministry.

== Ordained ministry ==
In 1981, Miller entered St John's College, Nottingham, an Anglican theological college to be trained for ordained ministry. There, he completed a Diploma in Pastoral Studies (DPS) in 1983. He was ordained in the Church of England as a deacon in 1983 and as a priest in 1984.

After a curacy in Jarrow he was Team Vicar at St Aidan and St Luke, Billingham from 1986 to 1992; Urban Development Officer for the Diocese of Durham from 1991 to 1996; Vicar of St Cuthbert, Darlington from 1996 to 1999; and a residentiary canon at Newcastle Cathedral from 1995 until his archdeacon's appointment. He was installed as Dean of Newcastle on 20 October 2018, having served as acting dean from 4 February 2018. He retired in November 2022.

In February 2023, Miller was appointed as a deputy lieutenant for Tyne and Wear.

Church of England titles
Preceded by Peter Elliott	Archdeacon of Northumberland; 2005–2018	Succeeded by Mark Wroe
Preceded by Chris Dalliston	Dean of Newcastle; 2018–2022	Succeeded by Lee Batson
