= List of honorary fellows of King's College, Cambridge =

This is a list of Honorary Fellows of King's College, Cambridge.

- Danielle Allen
- Neal Ascherson
- John Barrell
- Sir George Benjamin
- Sir Adrian Cadbury
- Anthony Clarke, Baron Clarke of Stone-cum-Ebony
- Michael Cook
- Caroline Elam
- John Ellis
- E. M. Forster
- Carlos Frenk
- Roger Fry
- Sir John Eliot Gardiner
- Dame Anne Glover
- Sir Nicholas Goodison
- John Habgood, Baron Habgood
- Sir Oliver Hart
- Hermann Hauser
- Eric Hobsbawm
- Lisa Jardine
- Mervyn King, Baron King of Lothbury
- Sir Geoffrey Lloyd
- Sir Alfred Comyn Lyall
- Prasanta Chandra Mahalanobis
- Dusa McDuff
- Rana Mitter
- Frances Morris
- Karl Pearson
- Nicholas Phillips, Baron Phillips of Worth Matravers
- Sir Edward Playfair
- Atta ur Rahman
- C. R. Rao
- Martin Rees, Baron Rees of Ludlow
- David Sainsbury, Baron Sainsbury of Turville
- Alic Halford Smith
- Robert Tear
- Leslie Valiant
- Herman Waldmann
- Judith Weir
- Sir David Willcocks

== See also ==
- Category:Alumni of King's College, Cambridge
- Category:Fellows of King's College, Cambridge
