= List of deans of Christ Church, Oxford =

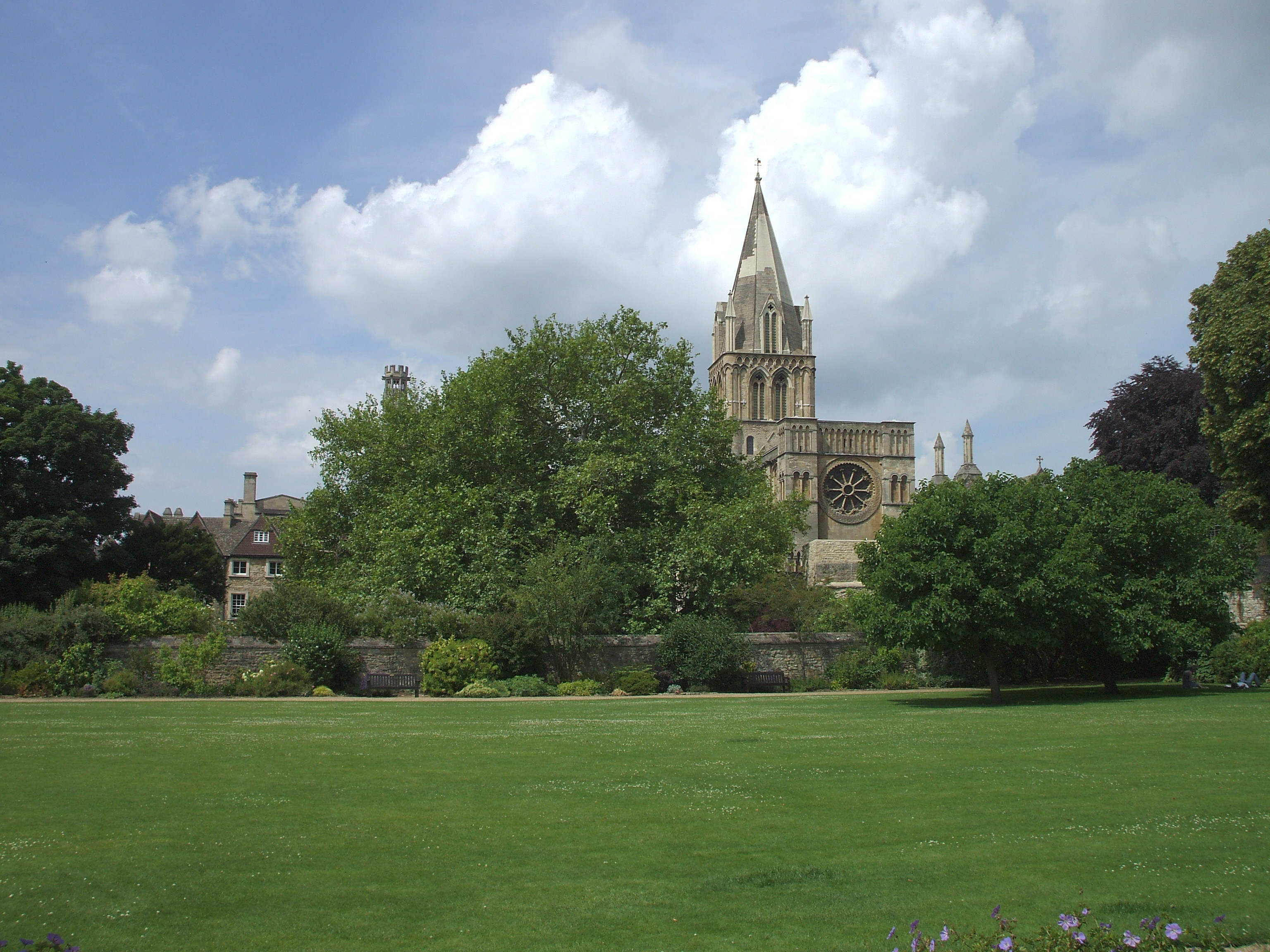
Christ Church Cathedral

The Dean of Christ Church is the dean of Christ Church Cathedral, Oxford and head of the governing body of Christ Church, a constituent college of the University of Oxford.

The cathedral is the mother church of the Church of England Diocese of Oxford and seat of the Bishop of Oxford. The chapter of canons of the cathedral formed the governing body of the college from its foundation until the Christ Church, Oxford Act 1867 (30 & 31 Vict. c. 76), by which the governing body was expanded to include the students (academics) in addition to the dean and chapter. The dean was ex officio head of the chapter and ipso facto head of the college. From 26 April 2022 until July 2023, the position was vacant. As of 8 July 2023, Sarah Foot is the first female dean of Christ Church.

== List of deans ==
From the diocese's foundation in 1542 until 1545, the cathedral was at Osney. There, the cathedral deans were:

- John London (1542–1543)
- Richard Cox (1543–1545, reappointed dean at Christ Church)

The academic deans of Christ Church's predecessor Oxford colleges were:

- John Hygdon (Dean of Cardinal College, 1525–1531; Dean of King Henry VIII's College, 1532–1533)
- John Oliver (Dean of King Henry VIII's College, 1533–1545)

Both the college and the see at Osney surrendered to the Crown on 20 May 1545. Christ Church, the double establishment of cathedral and college, was founded by letters patent on 4 November 1546.

Name	Portrait	Term of office	
Richard Cox		1546	1553
Richard Marshall		1553	1559
George Carew		1559	1561
Thomas Sampson		1561	1565
Thomas Godwin		1565	1567
Thomas Cooper		1567	1571
John Piers		1571	1576
Tobias Matthew		1577	1583
William James		1584	1596
Thomas Ravis (in commendam as Bishop of Gloucester from 1604)		1596	1605
John King		1605	1611
William Goodwin		1611	1620
Richard Corbet		1620	1628
Brian Duppa		1628	1638
Samuel Fell		1638	1648
Edward Reynolds		1648	1651
John Owen		1651	1660
Edward Reynolds		March–July 1660	
George Morley		July–October 1660	
John Fell (in commendam as Bishop of Oxford from 1676)		1660	1686^{[†]}
John Massey		1686	1688
Henry Aldrich		1689	1710^{[†]}
Francis Atterbury		1711	1713
George Smalridge (in commendam as Bishop of Bristol from 1714)		1713	1719^{[†]}
Hugh Boulter (in commendam as Bishop of Bristol)		1719	1724
William Bradshaw (in commendam as Bishop of Bristol)		1724	1732^{[†]}
John Conybeare (in commendam as Bishop of Bristol from 1750)		1733	1755^{[†]}
David Gregory		1756	1767^{[†]}
William Markham (in commendam as Bishop of Chester from 1771)		1767	1777
Lewis Bagot (in commendam as Bishop of Bristol from 1782)		1777	1783
Cyril Jackson		1783	1809
Charles Henry Hall		1809	1824
Samuel Smith		1824	1831
Thomas Gaisford		1831	1855^{[†]}
Henry Liddell		1855	1891
Francis Paget		1892	1901
Thomas Strong		1901	1920
Henry Julian White		1920	1934
Alwyn Williams		1934	1939
John Lowe		1939	1959
Cuthbert Simpson		1959	1969
Henry Chadwick		1969	1979
Eric Heaton		1979	1991
John Drury		1991	2003
Christopher Lewis	Christopher Lewis, then Dean of Christ Church, with Queen Elizabeth II	2003	2014
Martyn Percy		2014	2022
Sarah Foot		2023	

^{†} Died in office
