= John Drury (dean of Christ Church) =

British Anglican priest (born 1936)

The Very Reverend John Drury
- Dean of Christ Church
- Church: Church of England
- Diocese: Oxford
- In office: 1991 to 2003
- Predecessor: Eric Heaton
- Successor: Christopher Lewis
- Other post: Chaplain of All Souls College, Oxford (2003–2024)

Personal details
- Born: John Henry Drury; 23 May 1936 (age 90)
- Denomination: Anglicanism

John Henry Drury (born 23 May 1936) is a British Anglican priest and author. He was the dean of Christ Church Cathedral, Oxford, from 1991 to 2003 and chaplain of All Souls College, Oxford, from 2003 to 2024.

== Personal life ==
Drury was educated at Bradfield College and Trinity Hall, Cambridge. In 2009 he married the art historian Caroline Elam.

== Ordained ministry ==
Drury was ordained in 1963. His first post was a curacy at St John's Wood. Later he was chaplain of Downing College, Cambridge, then a fellow of Exeter College, Oxford. From 1973 to 1979 he was a residentiary canon at Norwich Cathedral and then head of religious studies at Sussex University. From 1981 to 1991 he was the dean of King's College, Cambridge. That year he became Dean of Christ Church, Oxford, a post he held for 12 years. He was chaplain of All Souls College, Oxford, from 2003 to 2024.

== Honours ==
He has been awarded a Doctor of Divinity (DD) Lambeth degree.

== Selected writings ==
- Angels and Dirt, 1972
- Luke, 1973
- Tradition and Design in Luke's Gospel, 1976
- The Pot and The Knife, 1979
- The Parables in the Gospels, 1985
- Critics of the Bible 1724–1873, 1989
- The Burning Bush, 1990
- Painting the Word, 1999
- Music at Midnight: the Life and Poetry of George Herbert, 2013

Church of England titles
Preceded by Eric William Heaton	Dean of Christ Church, Oxford; 1991– 2003	Succeeded by Christopher Andrew Lewis
