= Jeffrey John =

British Anglican priest (born 1953)

The Very Reverend Jeffrey John
- Associate Chaplain, St George's Paris
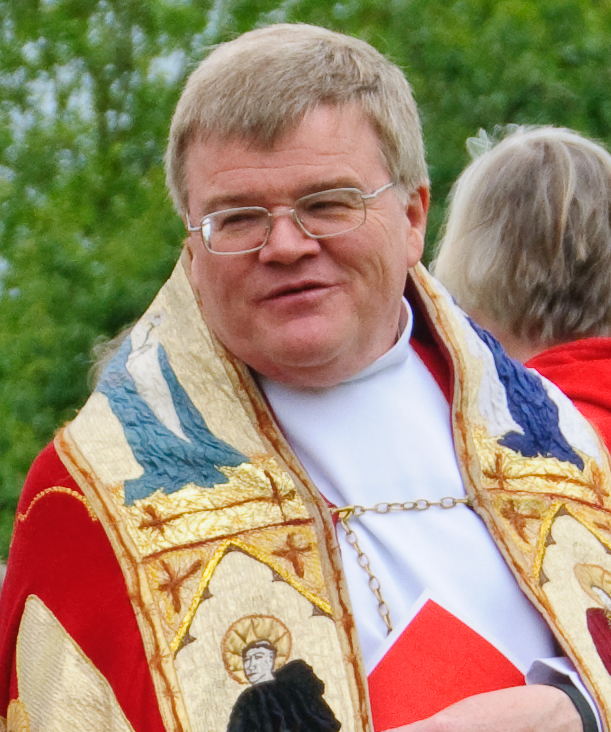
- John in 2009
- Church: Church of England
- Diocese: Europe
- In office: 2021 – present
- Other posts: Bishop-designate of Reading (2003); Dean of St Albans (2004–2021)

Orders
- Ordination: 1978 (deacon); 1979 (priest)

Personal details
- Born: Jeffrey Philip Hywel John; 10 February 1953 (age 73) Tonyrefail, Glamorgan, Wales
- Denomination: Anglican
- Spouse: Grant Holmes
- Education: Hertford College, Oxford; St Stephen's House, Oxford

Jeffrey Philip Hywel John (born 10 February 1953) is a Church of England priest, who served as the Dean of St Albans from 2004 to 2021. He made headlines in 2003 when he was the first person to have openly been in a same-sex relationship to be nominated as a Church of England bishop. Owing to the consequent controversy he stepped down. In the years since, he has reportedly been considered for at least seven diocesan bishoprics across England, Wales and the Isle of Man.

== Early life and education ==
John was born in Tonyrefail in South Wales in 1953. He studied at Tonyrefail Grammar School and Hertford College, Oxford, where he gained a first in classics and modern languages in 1975. He subsequently studied theology at St Stephen's House, Oxford, and obtained second-class honours. He later undertook a Doctor of Philosophy (DPhil) degree at the University of Oxford, which he completed in 1984 with a doctoral thesis titled "The importance of St Paul and the Pauline Epistles in second century Christian Gnosticism (apart from Marcion)".

== Ordained ministry ==
John was ordained in the Church in Wales: he was made deacon at Petertide 1978 (24 June) by David Reece, Assistant Bishop of Llandaff; and ordained priest the next Petertide (30 June 1979) by John Poole-Hughes, Bishop of Llandaff — both times in Llandaff Cathedral. After a curacy in Penarth he returned to Oxford in 1980 to study for a doctorate in Pauline theology. He became chaplain at Brasenose College. In 1984, he was appointed Dean of Divinity at Magdalen College, Oxford. In 1991 he was one of the founder members of Affirming Catholicism, a group promoting Catholicism within the Anglican tradition. He is also a trustee of the organisation. He also supported the campaign for the ordination of women. From 1991 he was the vicar of Holy Trinity, Eltham, (in the Diocese of Southwark) in south London. In 1997 he became Canon Chancellor and Theologian of Southwark Cathedral.

On 20 May 2003 John was nominated as Bishop of Reading, an area bishop in the Diocese of Oxford. The nomination led to controversy both in the Church of England and the wider Anglican Communion owing to John's long-term relationship (beginning in 1976) with Grant Holmes, also a Church of England priest, despite publicly stating that their relationship was celibate. John received criticism on his nomination both for his stance on gay issues and because he had not publicly repented his past sexual activities in such a way as to indicate that they were wrong. A number of conservative Anglican leaders in various countries stated their intention to split from the communion if the consecration went ahead. Concerns over the potential for division led Rowan Williams, Archbishop of Canterbury, to pressure John to step down. On 6 July 2003, he reportedly withdrew his acceptance of the nomination to the bishopric though it later emerged that he had not in fact agreed to do so. By that point, the process of his taking up the role was already quite advanced. These events inspired the creation of Inclusive Church. In spite of the withdrawal of John the differences in views of homosexuality within the Anglican church continued to cause controversy in 2003 following the election of Gene Robinson as Bishop of New Hampshire in the Episcopal Church in the United States.

On 19 April 2004, 10 Downing Street announced John's appointment as Dean of St Albans. He was inducted on 2 July 2004.

In 2021, John resigned as dean to become an associate chaplain at St George's, Paris. His final service at St Albans was on 14 February 2021.

=== Consideration for diocesan sees ===
At the end of August 2008, speculation began that John was one of the nominees for the post of Bishop of Bangor in Wales. A series of media reports in August and September 2008 added weight to the story, which drew strong negative reactions from conservative commentators from within the Church of England and in other conservative quarters.

July 2010 saw widespread media reports that John was the Crown Nomination Commission's preferred candidate for appointment as Bishop of Southwark in succession to Tom Butler. These reports again attracted wide comment, both in support and in opposition. Subsequent reports suggested that his name had been removed from the list of potential appointees following leaking of the proposal.

He was also reportedly on the shortlists to be appointed Bishop of Exeter in 2013 and Bishop of St Edmundsbury and Ipswich in 2014. It has also been reported that he was omitted from the shortlists for Bishop of St Asaph (2008) and Bishop of Sodor and Man (2017) on grounds of his civil partnership.

In 2017, John was again almost elected as a diocesan bishop, this time as Bishop of Llandaff. His candidacy was reportedly supported by a majority of the electors, but not the required supermajority. When no candidate reached that level of support within the required time-frame, the right to elect lapsed to the House of Bishops of the Church in Wales, who stated that no previous candidate would be considered again. Replying to a letter from John Davies (Bishop of Swansea and Brecon), acting Archbishop of Wales, John made a public response accusing the Church of homophobia throughout the process.

In 2018, John was on the four candidate short list for election as Bishop of Brechin in the Scottish Episcopal Church; he was not elected.

== Views ==
Following a talk broadcast on BBC Radio 4 in Holy Week 2007, John was criticised by some Evangelical bishops for denying the Reformed Protestant doctrine of penal substitutionary atonement. Critics included Tom Wright, Bishop of Durham; Pete Broadbent, Bishop of Willesden; and Wallace Benn, Bishop of Lewes. Referring to this particular explanation of the Christ's crucifixion, John said, "It was worse than illogical, it was insane. It made God sound like a psychopath." In explaining his own view, he said, "On the cross Jesus dies for our sins; the price of our sin is paid; but it is not paid to God but by God". He cited Julian of Norwich, a 14th-century English mystic who asserted that there is no wrath in God.

John has spoken publicly in favour of the introduction of same-sex marriage saying, "If you are gay, then please understand that God made you as you are, and loves you as you are, and if you invite him into your relationship, then of course he will bless you and sustain your love just as much as he blesses and sustains any other marriage."

== Personal life ==
In August 2006, after being in a relationship for 30 years, John and Grant Holmes entered into a civil partnership. Clergy in the Church of England are permitted to enter into same-sex civil partnerships, provided they remain celibate.

== Writings ==
- The Meaning in the Miracles (Canterbury Press, November 2001); ISBN 1-85311-434-0
- The Ministry of Deliverance (Affirming Catholicism) (Darton, Longman and Todd Ltd, February 1997); ISBN 0-232-52222-7
- Marriage, Divorce and the Church (Affirming Catholicism) (Darton, Longman and Todd Ltd, February 1997); ISBN 0-232-52224-3
- Living the Mystery: Affirming Catholicism and the Future of the Church (as editor; Darton, Longman and Todd Ltd, April 1994); ISBN 0-232-52071-2
- Permanent, Faithful, Stable: Christian Same-Sex Partnerships (Darton, Longman and Todd Ltd, January 1994); ISBN 0-232-52075-5
- Living Tradition: Affirming Catholicism in the Anglican Church (Darton, Longman and Todd Ltd, January 1992); ISBN 0-232-51981-1
