= Noel Kennaby =

Noel Martin Kennaby was Dean of St Albans from 1964 until 1973. He was born on 22 December 1905, educated at Queens' College, Cambridge and ordained in 1930. His first post was as a curate at Epsom after which he was priest in charge of Christ Church, Scarborough then Vicar of St Andrew's Handsworth. In 1943 he became Rural Dean of Tynemouth and then Provost of Newcastle. His last post before his appointment to the deanery was as senior chaplain to the Archbishop of Canterbury. He died on 22 January 1994.

Church of England titles
Preceded by George Edward Brigstocke	Provost of Newcastle; 1947 –1963	Succeeded by Conrad Clifton Wolters
Preceded by Arthur Kenneth Mathews	Dean of St Albans; 1964 –1973	Succeeded by Peter Clement Moore
