= Edward Henderson (dean) =

English priest (1873–1947)

Edward Lowry Henderson (1873 – 26 September 1947) was a priest in the Church of England and the Scottish Episcopal Church.

Born in 1873 and educated at Radley and Oriel College, Oxford, he was ordained in 1899. His first post was as a Curate of St Anne's Limehouse, after which he was Rector of St Margaret's Church, Lowestoft and then a Residentiary Canon at Gloucester Cathedral. In 1919, he was appointed Provost of St Mary's Cathedral, Edinburgh. In 1925, he became Dean of St Albans and a decade later of Salisbury. He retired in 1943, becoming Dean Emeritus and died on 26 September 1947.

His son Edward was Bishop of Bath and Wells from 1960 to 1975.

Church of England titles
Preceded by John Skinner Wilson	Provost of St Mary's Cathedral, Edinburgh; 1920 –1925	Succeeded by William James Margetson
Preceded by George Wilfrid Blenkin	Dean of St Albans; 1925 –1935	Succeeded by Cuthbert Carroll Thicknesse
Preceded by John Hugh Granville Randolph	Dean of Salisbury; 1936 –1943	Succeeded by Henry Charles Robins
