= Chris Dalliston =

Dean of Peterborough

The Very Reverend Chris Dalliston OStJ
- Dean of Peterborough
- Church: Church of England
- Diocese: Diocese of Peterborough
- In office: 2018 – present
- Other post: Dean of Newcastle (2003–2018)

Orders
- Ordination: 1984 (deacon); 1985 (priest)

Personal details
- Born: Christopher Charles Dalliston; 2 April 1956 (age 70)
- Denomination: Anglicanism
- Spouse: Michelle (m. 1989)
- Children: four
- Education: Diss High School
- Alma mater: Peterhouse, Cambridge; St Stephen's House, Oxford

Christopher Charles Dalliston (born 2 April 1956) is a British Anglican priest. He has been Dean of Peterborough since 2018, and was previously the Dean of Newcastle.

== Early life and education ==
Dalliston was born on 2 April 1956. He was educated at Diss High School, then a grammar school in Diss, Norfolk. After studying at Peterhouse, Cambridge, he worked at Ford Motor Company from 1978 to 1981. In 1981, he entered St Stephen's House, Oxford to study theology and train for ordination. He graduated from the University of Oxford with a BA degree in 1984.

== Ordained ministry ==
Dalliston was ordained in the Church of England as a deacon in 1984 and as a priest in 1985. From 1984 to 1987, he served his curacy at St Andrew with Holy Trinity, Halstead in the Diocese of Chelmsford. He was then domestic chaplain to John Waine, Bishop of Chelmsford between 1987 and 1991. From 1991 to 1995, he was Vicar of St Edmund's Church, Forest Gate, London.

In 1995, Dalliston moved to the Diocese of Lincoln. He was priest in charge of St Botolph's Church, Boston, from 1995 to 1997, and then vicar of the parish from 1997 to 2003. He was also the area dean of Holland East between 1997 and 2003.

From 2003 until 2018, he served as the dean of Newcastle; as such he was the first-among-equals of the chapter of Newcastle Cathedral and the most senior priest in the Diocese of Newcastle. In November 2017 he was nominated as the dean of Peterborough, and he was duly installed there on 20 January 2018.

== Personal life ==
In 1989, Dalliston married Michelle Aleysha Caron. Together they have four children; two sons and two daughters.

== Honours ==
In 2013, Dalliston was appointed to the Venerable Order of St John (MStJ) In 2023, he was promoted to an Officer of the Order (OStJ).

Church of England titles
Preceded by Nicholas Coulton	Dean of Newcastle; 2003 – 2018	Succeeded by Geoff Miller
Preceded by Charles Taylor	Dean of Peterborough; 2018–present	Incumbent
