= George Brigstocke =

George Edward Brigstocke (20 July 1891 – 25 October 1971) was an Anglican priest who converted to Roman Catholicism six years before his death.

Brigstocke was born in France to Hugh Mitchell Brigstocke and his wife, Anna Osborne. He had one brother, Capt. Hugh Fraser Brigstocke, who was killed in the First World War while serving with the King's Own Scottish Borderers.

He was educated at Marlborough and Keble College, Oxford and ordained in 1915. After curacies in Castleford and Stockton-on-Tees he held incumbencies at Horden and Hull. He was Provost of St Newcastle Cathedral from 1938 to 1947 then Principal of the College of the Venerable Bede, Durham until 1959. The college was for the training of school teachers and during World War II Brigstocke had served as a teacher of scripture for those pupils of Dame Allan's Schools who had not been evacuated, and at which schools he also chaired the governing body. He was a Canon Residentiary at Durham Cathedral and then Examining Chaplain to the Archbishop of Canterbury until he was received into the Roman Catholic Church in 1965.

One son, Hugh, was a noted art historian, while the other, Sir John Brigstocke, became an admiral in the Royal Navy.

Church of England titles
Preceded by John Bateman-Champain	Provost of Newcastle; 1938 – 1947	Succeeded by Noel Martin Kennaby
