= Clifton Wolters =

Anglican priest

Conrad Clifton Wolters (3 April 1909 – 7 February 1991) was an eminent Anglican priest in the 20th century.

Wolters was educated privately and at St John's College, Durham where he was a major prize winner and took First Class Honours in all parts of his Tripos. He was ordained in 1934. After curacies at Gipsy Hill and Beckenham he held incumbencies in Wimbledon Park and Sanderstead. He was Provost of Newcastle Cathedral from 1962 to 1976.

In retirement he was Chaplain to the Society of Saint Margaret. He was a leading expert on the medieval English mystics and produced what are still regarded by most as the outstanding modern English translations of The Cloud of Unknowing, Julian of Norwich, and Richard Rolle for Penguin Classics. He was much sought after as a Spiritual Director and Retreat Conductor as well as by conferences on the medieval mystics.

Church of England titles
Preceded by Noel Martin Kennaby	Provost of Newcastle; 1962 – 1976	Succeeded by Christopher Garnett Howsin Spafford
