= Henry Chadwick (theologian) =

British academic and Anglican priest (1920–2008)

The Very Reverend Henry Chadwick KBE FBA
- Chadwick in 1966
- Born: 23 June 1920; Bromley, Kent, England
- Died: 17 June 2008 (aged 87); Oxford, England
- Occupations: Academic and Anglican priest
- Title: Knight Commander of the Order of the British Empire

Academic background
- Education: Eton College
- Alma mater: Magdalene College, Cambridge; Ridley Hall, Cambridge

Henry Chadwick KBE FBA (23 June 1920 – 17 June 2008) was a British academic, theologian and Church of England priest. A former dean of Christ Church Cathedral, Oxford—and as such, head of Christ Church, Oxford—he also served as master of Peterhouse, Cambridge.

A leading historian of the early church, Chadwick was appointed Regius Professor at both the universities of Oxford and Cambridge. He was a noted supporter of improved relations with the Catholic Church, and a leading member of the Anglican–Roman Catholic International Commission. An accomplished musician, having studied music to degree level, he took a leading part in the revision and updating of hymnals widely used within Anglicanism, chairing the board of the publisher Hymns Ancient & Modern Ltd. for 20 years.

== Family and early life ==
Born in Bromley, Kent, Chadwick was the son of a barrister (who died when Chadwick was five) and a music-loving mother. He had a number of accomplished siblings: Sir John Chadwick served as the British Ambassador to Romania, and the Revd William Owen Chadwick and his other brother also became priests. Despite this, it was one of his sisters whom Chadwick would later describe as "the brightest of us all." Chadwick was educated at Eton College, where he became a King's Scholar. Although he did not show much aptitude as a Grecian, his lifelong love of music made its first appearance and resulted in his receiving organ lessons from Henry Ley.

After leaving Eton, he went to Magdalene College, Cambridge, on a music scholarship, and was expected to make music his career. A highlight of his undergraduate musical career was playing a two piano arrangement of Chabrier's España with Boris Ord, then organist of King's College, Cambridge. However, Chadwick chose to further his interest in Evangelical Christianity, which had existed from his school days. He graduated in 1941 and began his theological training in 1942, at Ridley Hall, Cambridge, being ordained deacon by the Archbishop of Canterbury, in Canterbury Cathedral, in 1943 and priest by the Bishop of Dover in 1944. He served a curacy at the Evangelical parish of Emmanuel, Croydon, arriving towards the end of the Second World War, as Croydon was attacked by German V-weapons, which provided a difficult pastoral challenge. From there, he became an assistant master at Wellington College. He married Margaret "Peggy" Browning in 1945, and they had three daughters.

== Academic career ==
=== Cambridge ===
Chadwick became a Fellow of Queens' College, Cambridge, with his appointment as chaplain in 1946, and in 1950 advanced to the position of dean. His rising academic reputation was confirmed in 1953 with the publication of a project which had occupied him since the days of his curacy—his new translation of Origen's Contra Celsum, with introduction and notes. He had by now made himself an expert in Patristic Greek; only an inexactness in philology marking his earlier abandonment of Greek for music. Also in 1953 he was appointed co-editor (with Hedley Sparks) of the Journal of Theological Studies and continued editing it until 1985. He held the university appointment of Hulsean Lecturer from 1954 to 1956.

=== Oxford ===
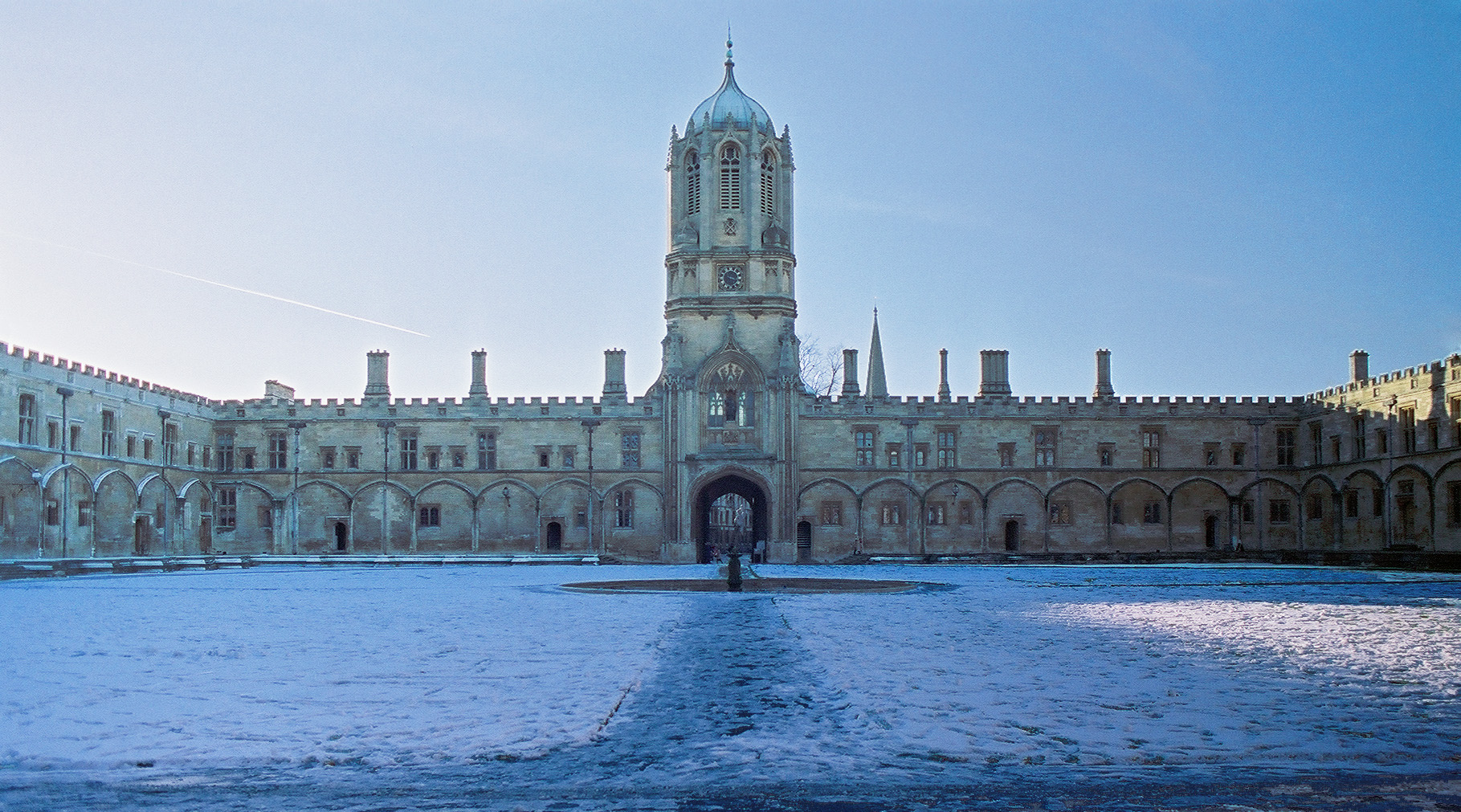
Tom Quad at Christ Church, Oxford, where Chadwick and his family lived during his time at Christ Church

Chadwick moved to Oxford in 1959, to take up the position of Regius Professor of Divinity (and with it the associated canonry at Christ Church Cathedral) at the relatively young age of 39. He was named a Fellow of the British Academy (FBA) soon after, and in 1962 Gifford Lecturer at the University of St Andrews lecturing on Authority in the Early Church. He gave a second series of lectures in 1963–64, on Authority in Christian Theology. 1963 also saw him appointed to an early Anglican inquiry into the issues surrounding the ordination of women. In the 1960s, along with scholars like E. R. Dodds, Peter Brown, and John Matthews, Chadwick helped make Oxford a centre in the developing study of Late Antiquity. He clarified the classical philosophical roots of Christian thinkers from Justin Martyr and Clement of Alexandria to Augustine of Hippo, and set about raising academic standards within the theology department—in particular making the degree of Doctor of Divinity (DD) into a genuine research degree, as opposed to an honorary award made to senior clerics who had produced a volume of sermons. 1967 saw the publication of his most widely read work, The Early Church, published under the Pelican imprint of Penguin Books. He was disappointed that he was allowed to include so few footnotes in the original publication, and correspondingly delighted when the publishers of a German edition requested additional notes for their translation. That same year he was appointed to a Church of England doctrine commission investigating "The place of the Articles in the Anglican tradition and the question of Subscription and Assent to them", which produced its report in July 1968 ready for that year's Lambeth Conference. The report ultimately led to changes in the doctrinal affirmations required of Church of England clergy at their ordination or on taking up new appointments. In 1968 he was appointed a vice-president of the British Academy.

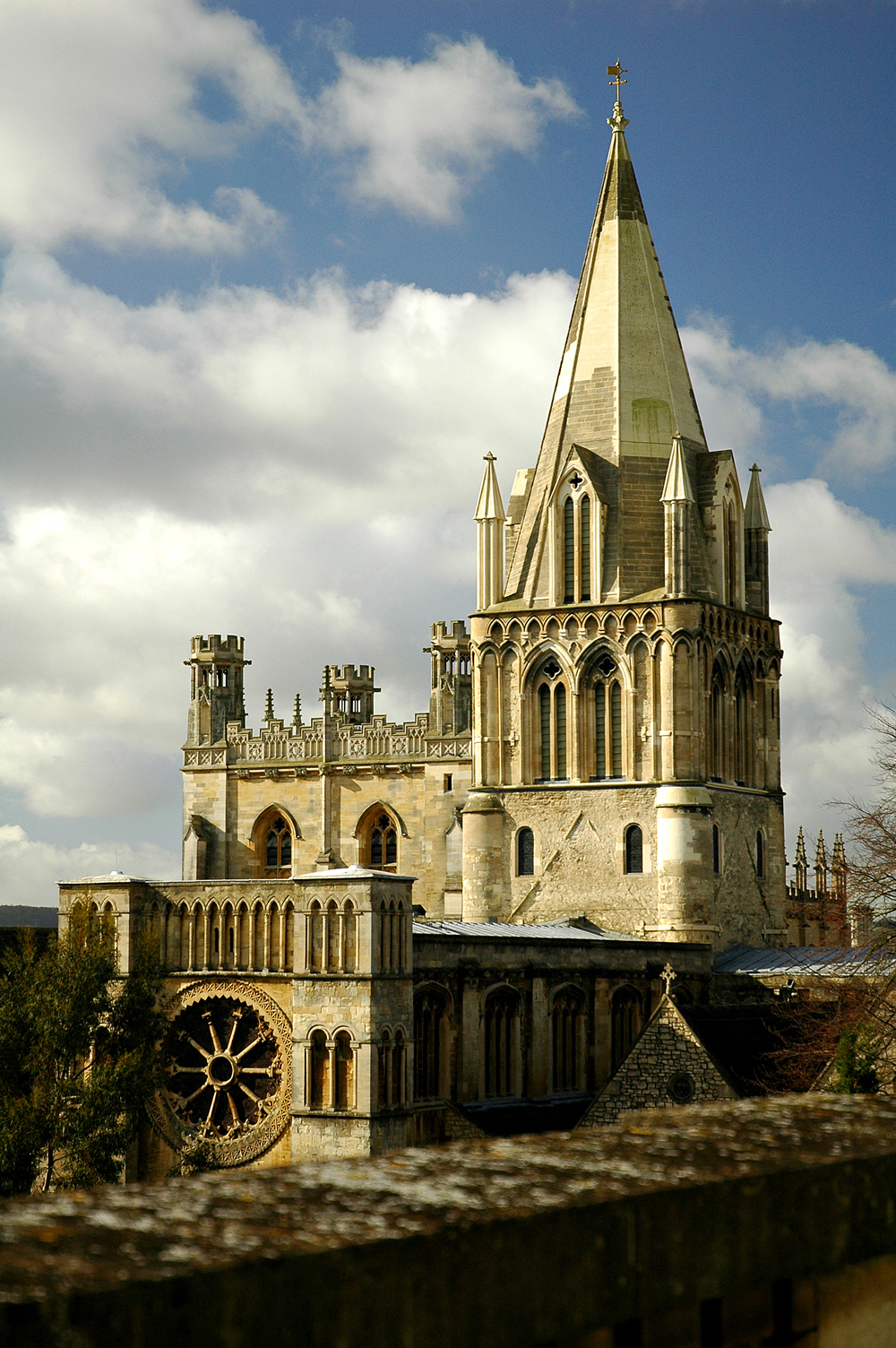
Christ Church Cathedral, Oxford, of which Chadwick was dean for ten years

In 1969, Chadwick was appointed Dean of Christ Church, uniquely a dual role as a cathedral dean and head of a college. This period was not entirely happy; a scholarly ability to see all sides of a question, along with an ingrained desire not to upset his colleagues, sometimes made it hard for him to make a quick or firm decision. However, during his time as Dean the college benefited from a continued programme of renovation with internal changes that provided more student accommodation. The position gave Chadwick the chance to influence the musical direction of the cathedral. In The Independent newspaper, obituary writer Andrew Louth notes that at the retirement of Sydney Watson as organist, when he and Chadwick played piano duets together Chadwick's technique was the equal of Watson's. The new organist, Simon Preston, had ambitious plans for improving musical standards, and Chadwick was pleased to be able to support these, not least by raising funds for a new organ.

Chadwick also found time to contribute to the administration of the wider university, serving on the Hebdomadal Council, as a Delegate of Oxford University Press, as one of the curators of the Bodleian, and as Pro-Vice-Chancellor 1974–75. It was during this period that he began to participate in the discussions of the Anglican–Roman Catholic International Commission (ARCIC); he was a member of the commission 1969–1981 and again 1983–1990. his early Evangelical sympathies having been tempered over time, helped by his friendship with Edward Yarnold, Master of Campion Hall. He was a master of the Anglican approach of producing statements capable of a range of interpretations to enable common ground to be reached; this worked well for simpler historical differences, but did not always impress the Roman Catholic members of the commission when it came to questions of ecclesiology and church authority. He was also able to use his historical background to put forward summaries of early church positions on a variety of subjects, and he had a true desire to establish consensus on the basis of the principles revealed by this research. Although his scholarly output suffered from the pressures on his time, he was editor of Oxford Early Christian Texts (from 1970), and was able to work on two major monographs, Priscillian of Avila: the occult and the charismatic in the early Church (published 1976) and Boethius: the consolations of music, logic, theology and philosophy (published 1981). The second of these in particular allowing him to draw on the full range of his interests.

=== Return to Cambridge ===
In 1979, Chadwick resigned the deanship, returning to Cambridge to take up the Regius Chair of Divinity. Additionally, he became a Syndic of Cambridge University Press, a Fellow of Magdalene, and was installed as an honorary canon of Ely Cathedral. He gained a reputation as a popular lecturer in Cambridge, and between 1982 and 1983 gave the Sarum Lectures in Oxford, for which his subject was Augustine of Hippo. Edited, these lectures became the basis for his 1986 book, Augustine. He retired from the professorship in 1983 and settled in Oxford.

After four years in retirement, he received an unexpected invitation to become Master of Peterhouse in 1987, thus becoming the first person in over four centuries to lead a college at both Oxford and Cambridge. Chadwick's second appointment as head of a college proved a happier experience than his first. The college had been experiencing some problems following the admission of the first female students, to which some fellows were implacably opposed, making their displeasure known at High Table. Chadwick insisted on civility, which coupled with the retirement of some of the fellows, ensured an improvement in the atmosphere within the college. This continued after his second retirement (again to Oxford) in 1993. He was appointed Knight Commander of the Order of the British Empire in the 1989 Queen's Birthday Honours. In 1991 he published a new translation of Augustine's Confessions, with extensive notes revealing Augustine's debt to Plotinus.

Chadwick also edited Oxford Early Christian Studies (from 1990). With his brother Owen, he edited The Oxford History of the Christian Church (12 vols., 1981–2010). His own volumes in this series were The Church in Ancient Society: from Galilee to Gregory the Great (2001) and East and West: The Making of a Rift in the Church: From Apostolic Times until the Council of Florence (2005). His final work was to have been on Photios I of Constantinople, research for which covered many of his interests, particularly classical learning and Christianity, and ecumenism. Some of his material on the topic was published in East and West. He was also an Editorial Advisor of Dionysius. He died in Oxford on 17 June 2008.

== Reputation and recognition ==
Writing in an obituary for The Guardian, the then Archbishop of Canterbury, Rowan Williams, wrote, "'The Anglican church,' it was said, 'may not have a Pope, but it does have Henry Chadwick,'" and further described him as an "aristocrat among Anglican scholars". Other obituaries and appreciations describe how he was generous with his time and knowledge, and always ready to point students in the right direction. The Independent credits his capacious memory and a personal library of around 20,000 books as the foundation of his broad scholarship. According to The Times, when reviewing others' writing he was usually generous, though capable of a courteous demolition job when well-deserved.

A capable preacher, though doubtful of his ability when preaching to a non-academic congregation, Chadwick was well regarded as a lecturer and companion at High Table. However, a natural shyness could give him a rather remote air. On an American lecture tour, he noticed three young women who came to every lecture, but took no notes. At the end of lectures he asked the women how they had enjoyed them, to be told that they had no real interest in the subject itself, but they loved to hear him speak. The character of the college provost in the A Staircase in Surrey novels of Christ Church colleague J. I. M. Stewart was based on that of Chadwick.

Chadwick held honorary degrees from the universities of Glasgow, Uppsala, Yale, Leeds, Manchester, Surrey, Chicago, Harvard, Jena and the Augustinian University of Rome. He was made an honorary fellow of Queens' College, Cambridge, in 1958, just before he took up his Oxford Chair; and of Magdalene College, Cambridge, in 1962. He also treasured a stole given to him by Pope John Paul II in 1982, and this was placed on his coffin during his funeral at Christ Church on 25 June 2008. Two Festschriften were made in his honour, one for his contributions to the study of church history (Christian Authority, ed. Gillian Evans, 1988), the other for his ecumenical work (The Making of Orthodoxy, ed. Rowan Williams, 1989). In addition to his work on ARCIC he was involved in similar conversations with the Eastern Orthodox Churches. In 1974 Ladbrokes had Chadwick at odds of 7–1 for appointment as the next Archbishop of Canterbury; his brother Owen was at 6–1. In 1984 The Times reported that both brothers were reputed to have turned down more than one bishopric.

Chadwick's love of music led him to serve for twenty years as chairman of the council of Hymns Ancient & Modern Ltd. During this time the company expanded its scope. From producing the hymnbooks Hymns Ancient and Modern (A&M), and The English Hymnal, it also took ownership of Canterbury Press, SCM Press, and the Church Times, leading to jokes that Chadwick was an ecclesiastical Rupert Murdoch. He was heavily involved in the editorial process leading to the supplements to A&M, 100 Hymns for Today, More Hymns for Today, Worship Songs Ancient and Modern, and Hymns Ancient and Modern New Standard, which combined the best of the original book with that from the supplements into a single volume, and also the most recent revision, Common Praise. He had particularly argued for the inclusion of the spiritual "Steal Away", and this was amongst the music used at his funeral.

He served as a Governor of Monkton Combe School from 1964 to 1974.

Chadwick was an International member of both the American Academy of Arts and Sciences and the American Philosophical Society.

A memorial to him and his brother was unveiled at Westminster Abbey on 2 February 2018.

== Publications ==
Chadwick published over 125 books, monographs, articles etc. Mentioned in obituaries as being particularly notable are:

- Origen: Contra Celsum (1953)
- Lessing's Theological Writings (Selected and Translated, Stanford University Press, 1957)
- Early Christian Thought and The Classical Tradition: Studies in Justin, Clement, and Origen (Oxford, 1966)
- Priscillian of Avila: The Occult and the Charismatic in the Early Church (1976)
- Augustine (Past Masters, Oxford, 1986)
- Saint Augustine: Confessions (Translation, introduction, notes. Oxford, 1991)
- The Early Church (The Penguin History of the Church, 1967 revised 1993)
- Augustine: A Very Short Introduction (Oxford University Press, 2001)
- The Church in Ancient Society: From Galilee to Gregory the Great (Oxford History of the Christian Church, 2001)
- East and West: The Making of a Rift in the Church (History of the Christian Church, 2003)

Academic offices
Preceded by Leonard Hodgson	Regius Professor of Divinity at Oxford; 1959–1970	Succeeded by Maurice Wiles
Preceded by Cuthbert Simpson	Dean of Christ Church; 1969–1979	Succeeded by Eric Heaton
Preceded by Geoffrey Hugo Lampe	Regius Professor of Divinity at Cambridge; 1979–1985	Succeeded by Stephen Sykes
Preceded by Hugh Trevor-Roper	Master of Peterhouse, Cambridge; 1987–1993	Succeeded by Sir John Meurig Thomas
