= Diss High School =

Location
- Walcot Road; Diss, Norfolk, IP22 4DH; England
- Coordinates: 52°22′48″N 1°06′54″E

Information
- Type: Stand alone convertor Academy
- Department for Education URN: 137092 Tables
- Ofsted: Reports
- Headteacher: Sam Stopps name="census"/>
- Gender: Co-educational
- Age: 11 to 18
- Enrolment: 931 pupils
- Former pupils: Old Dysseans
- Website: http://www.disshigh.norfolk.sch.uk

Diss High School is a secondary school and sixth form with academy status located in Diss, Norfolk, England. The school has approximately 931 pupils from ages 11 to 18.

== Main school ==
The school is split into two main blocks designated A and B. A block is home to the English, Geography and History departments. It also holds the main school library and the staff room. B block houses the maths, science and modern foreign languages departments as well as the hall, school office, head teacher's office and head of year offices. The Art and Design Technology departments have a separate block as does the Music department. In 2014, Diss High School received a 'good' rating from Ofsted.

== Academics ==
The school supplements the formal with a wide range of extra-curricular activities that go beyond sport and music.

=== Curriculum ===
Virtually all maintained schools and academies follow the National Curriculum, and are inspected by Ofsted on how well they succeed in delivering a 'broad and balanced curriculum'. The school has to decide whether Key Stage 3 contains years 7, 8 and 9- or whether year 9 should be in Key Stage 4 and the students just study subjects that will be examined by the GCSE exams at 16. Diss has chosen the latter route.

Key Stage 3

In the first two years all students follow a basic course comprising Art, Design Technology, English, Drama, PSHEE, Geography, History, Food, French, Spanish, Computing, Mathematics, Music, Religious Studies and Science.

Key Stage 4

Currently all pupils study English, Mathematics, Science, Physical Education, Computing, a Modern Foreign Language (French or Spanish), a Humanities subject (History or Geography), Careers, Religious Studies and PSHEE. They opt to study two other GCSE subjects. To make a language compulsory at Key Stage 4 is unusual. Staff turnover has made it difficult to deliver good results and depressed the number of youngsters obtaining the English Baccalaureate that requires it.

== Uniform ==
In February 2014, the school featured in several media reports after it announced a ban on skirts as part of the school uniform, to begin the following September. The ban received support from some parents and criticism from others. The governing body supported the ban with Norfolk County Council stating that it is for the school to set rules and regulations on uniform.

== Notable alumni ==
Diss High School and its predecessor schools have been attended by several notable former pupils. These include the cricketer, Thomas Lord, footballers Matthew Upson and Declan Rudd. Politician Sir Ralph Howell, businessman Eric Nicoli and Anglican clergyman Dean Christopher Dalliston also attended Diss Grammar School.

Painter and etcher James Henry Govier taught art at Diss GS between 1965 and 1972 after it merged with Eye Grammar School. Writer and environmentalist Roger Deakin taught English and French at Diss GS for three years from 1974.
