= Cuthbert Thicknesse =

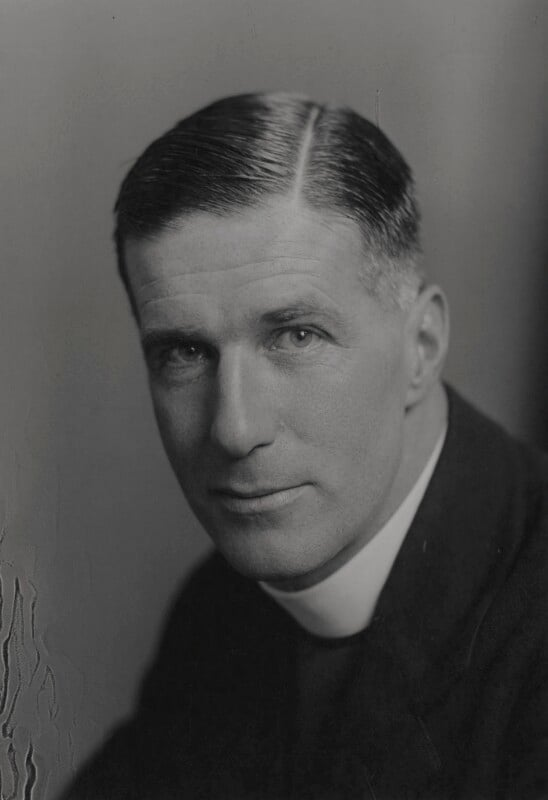
Thicknesse in the 1930s

Cuthbert Carroll Thicknesse (19 November 1887 – 2 June 1971) was Dean of St Albans from 1936 until his retirement in 1955.

Born into an ecclesiastical family of Lancashire landed gentry, the son of Ven. Francis Norman Thicknesse, and educated at Marlborough and Keble College, Oxford, he was ordained in 1913. He was firstly a Curate of St John-at-Hackney. He became a Temporary Chaplain to the Forces in May, 1915. He was sent to Flanders in January, 1917, attached to the Royal Artillery but, 4 months later, was wounded in the knee. He was invalided out in 1917 By then, he had married Rhoda Oonah Marjorie Moran Pratt, and the Archbishop of York was able to have him appointed Rector of Bedworth, a post reserved for Chaplains to the Forces. In 1922, he moved to Wigan, and was made an Honorary Chaplain to the King. In 1934, he was recommended for the vacant see at Guildford but was unsuccessful. He became Dean of St Albans two years later. Noted for a ‘volcanic’ temperament, he was a fierce opponent of nuclear weapons, and he refused to hold a service of celebration in St Albans Cathedral at the cessation of the war with Japan in August 1945. He was described in his obituary as “a high church man and convinced Anglican”.

Church of England titles
Preceded by Edward Henderson	Dean of St Albans; 1936–1955	Succeeded by Kenneth Mathews
