= George Blenkin =

English cleric

George Wilfrid Blenkin (16 February 1861 – 24 September 1924) was an Anglican cleric who was Dean of St Albans from 1914 until his death in 1924.

Blenkin was born in Boston, Lincolnshire into an ecclesiastical family, the son of Canon George Beatson Blenkin, sometime Vicar of Boston, and Maria Swan. He was educated at Harrow School and Trinity College, Cambridge, and ordained in 1886. He was successively chaplain of Emmanuel College, Cambridge and then of Trinity College, Cambridge and finally Vicar of Brading before his appointment as dean.

Church of England titles
Preceded by Walter Lawrance	Dean of St Albans; 1914–1924	Succeeded by Edward Henderson
