= Kenneth Mathews =

Arthur Kenneth Mathews OBE DSC was Dean of St Albans from 1955 until 1963.
He was born into an ecclesiastical family on 11 May 1906 and educated at Monkton Combe School and Balliol College, Oxford, where he met his future brother-in-law Henry Brooke, Baron Brooke of Cumnor through the Balliol Boys' Club, of which they were successively president. He was ordained in 1933. His first post was as a Curate at Penistone after which he was Padre to the Tanker Fleet of the Anglo-Saxon Petroleum Company and then Vicar of Forest Row. When World War II came he enlisted as a Chaplain in the RNVR during which he served on HMS Norfolk and was decorated twice for gallantry - in successful engagements against the German battleships Bismarck (in 1941) and Scharnhorst (in 1943). When peace returned he was Vicar of Rogate (1946–54) and Rural Dean of Midhurst (1950–54) before his elevation to the Deanery. After this he was Rector of St Peter’s, Peebles (1963–68) and Vicar of Thursley (1968-1976) before retiring in 1976. "A sailor's padre to the end", he died on 18 December 1992.

He was married twice: in 1936 to Agnes Elisabeth (Betty) Butler (who died in 1981) and in 1987 to Diana Goschen (who survived him). He had no children.

Church of England titles
Preceded by Cuthbert Thicknesse	Dean of St Albans; 1955–1963	Succeeded by Noel Kennaby
