= William Margetson =

William James Margetson (29 March 1874 – 30 March 1946) was an eminent Anglican priest in the first half of the twentieth century. He was educated at Oxford University and ordained in 1897. He held incumbencies of St Petroc Minor, Little Petherick, South Wimbledon, Surbiton and Newington before being appointed Provost of St Mary's Cathedral, Edinburgh in 1925, a post he held for 13 years.

He married Marion Jenoure and was the father of the diplomat Sir John Margetson.

Religious titles
| Preceded by Edward Lowry Henderson | Provost of St Mary’s Cathedral, Edinburgh; 1925–1938 | Succeeded by Ernest Denny Logie Danson |
