= Nicholas Coulton =

Nicholas Guy Coulton (born 14 June 1940) was Provost of Newcastle from 1990 to August 2001 and then, when the office title changed, its Dean until 2003.

Coulton was born on 14 June 1940, educated at Blundell's School, and qualified as a solicitor in 1962. He was ordained after a period of study at Ripon College Cuddesdon in 1967. He was curate of Pershore Abbey until 1971 when he became domestic chaplain to the Bishop of St Albans. In 1975 he became Vicar of St Paul’s Bedford, a post he held until his appointment at Newcastle.

From 2003 to 2008 he was a residentiary canon at Christ Church, Oxford.

Church of England titles
Preceded by Christopher Garnett Howsin Spafford	Provost, then Dean of Newcastle; 1990 – 2003	Succeeded by Christopher Charles Dalliston
