= Eric Nicoli =

British businessman

Eric Luciano Nicoli CBE
- Born: August 5, 1950 (age 75); United Kingdom
- Education: King's College London
- Occupation: Businessman
- Known for: Former CEO of EMI Group plc

Eric Luciano Nicoli, CBE (born 5 August 1950) is a British businessman who is Chairman of the PGA European Tour Group and has been the chairman of Centtrip since 2015. He was CEO of EMI Group plc between 12 January 2007 and August 2007, having previously been executive chairman of the group since July 1999.

In addition to his position at EMI, Nicoli has previously been group chief executive of United Biscuits (Holdings) plc (1991–1999) and non-executive chairman of HMV Group plc, The Tussauds Group Ltd and Vue Entertainment Ltd.

== Early life ==
Nicoli was born on 5 August 1950, the son of an Italian prisoner of war. His brother, Fabio Nicoli, who was an art director at A&M Records, died in 1977 at the young age of 30 from liver failure.

Nicoli was educated at Diss Grammar School and went on to graduate with a First Class degree in Physics from King's College London.

== Career ==
From 1972, Nicoli spent 27 years in the food manufacturing industry. While working in marketing for the confectionery company Rowntree's (previously owned by Rowntree Mackintosh), Nicoli spotted a gap in the market and filled it with two chocolate bars that have since become bestsellers: the Lion Bar and Yorkie.

From Rowntree’s, Nicoli joined the multinational food manufacturer United Biscuits in 1980. He started out as marketing director before moving to become the group business planning director from 1984. He was managing director of the Frozen Foods division in 1985 and of the Biscuit and Confectionery division from 1986 to 1988. In 1989, he became chief executive of the company’s European operations before stepping up to be group chief executive in 1991, a role he held until April 1999 when he moved to EMI. He was the youngest CEO of a FTSE 100 company.

Nicoli first joined EMI in the capacity of non-executive director in July 1993 and became an executive director on 1 May 1999 shortly before being appointed executive chairman. He left EMI in August 2007 when the company was sold to private equity group Terra Firma.

He became a director of HMV Group plc in 2000 and served as chairman from 2001 to 2004. He was also chairman of The Tussauds Group from 2001 to 2007, Vue Entertainment from 2006 to 2010, and uSwitch from 2013 to 2015. From 2010 to 2014, he was senior partner of Sunningdale Capital LLP. He was a non-executive director of Greencore Group from 2010 to 2017. He was chairman of YO! Sushi between 2015 and 2021.

Nicoli has been chairman of Centtrip since 2015. He is also currently a director for Akazoo and a senior independent director of PGA European Tour.

== Recognition ==
In July 2003, he received the honorary degree of Doctor of Engineering from Brunel University for his outstanding service to the local community. In 2006, he received the CBE for services to the music industry.
