= Walter Lawrance =

Walter John Lawrance (1840 – 1914) was a priest in the Church of England at the end of the 19th century and the first part of the 20th.

Lawrance was born in 1840 and educated at St Paul's and Trinity College, Cambridge, before he became ordained deacon in 1863 and priest in 1864. His first position was as a curate in St. Paul's, Chatham, then at Aylesford, both in Kent. He later moved to St Albans where he became the church's rector, then from 1883 the Archdeacon of St Albans. In March 1900 he was appointed the first Dean of St Albans. He was an Honorary Chaplain to the Queen from 1896, and Chaplain in Ordinary from July 1898.

Lawrance died on 12 August 1914.

Church of England titles
Preceded by Inaugural appointment	Dean of St Albans; 1900–1914	Succeeded by George Wilfrid Blenkin
