= Caroline Elam =

British art historian

Caroline Mary Elam (born 12 March 1945) is a British art historian specializing in Florentine architecture, art and patronage in the Renaissance. She has been a senior research fellow at the Warburg Institute in the University of London since 2012.

== Early life and education ==
Elam was born in 1945 to John Frederick ("Jack") Elam OBE (later headmaster of Colchester Royal Grammar School) and Joan Barrington Lloyd and attended Colchester County High School for Girls. She obtained a BA in classics at Lady Margaret Hall, University of Oxford, in 1967 and an MA in the history of art from the Courtauld Institute of Art in 1970.

Her brother John Nicholas Elam CMG (1939−2024), a diplomat and cultural adviser, served as British ambassador to Luxembourg in the 1990s.

== Career ==
Elam was appointed as a lecturer in the history of art at the University of Glasgow from 1970 to 1972. She was subsequently awarded a research fellowship at King's College, Cambridge from 1972 until 1976. She taught the history of art at Westfield College, University of London from 1976 to 1987 before serving as editor of the Burlington Magazine from 1987 until 2002. In addition to publishing articles on the history of art and curating exhibitions, Elam lectures widely in universities and art galleries. From 2002 to 2004 she was Andrew W. Mellon Professor for the History of Art at the Center for Advanced Studies for the Visual Arts in the National Gallery of Art, Washington, D.C. In 2004 she was appointed visiting professor at the Harvard Center for Italian Renaissance Studies at Villa I Tatti, Florence after winning the I Tatti Mongan Prize in 2003. She was a trustee of the Fitzwilliam Museum, Cambridge and an honorary fellow of King's College Cambridge. In 2005 she was awarded an honorary doctorate by Oxford Brookes University.

== Personal life ==
In 2009 Elam married the Very Rev. John Henry Drury, former dean of Christ Church Cathedral, Oxford.

== Selected publications ==
- Elam, Caroline (2004), Roger Fry and the Re-Evaluation of Piero della Francesca, The Council of The Frick Collection Lecture Series, The Frick Collection, ISBN 091211424X
- — (2006). Roger Fry: Manegna (in Italian). Translated by Rossella Rizzo. Milan: Abscondita. ISBN 9788884164254.
- — (2007). Roger Fry: Giovanni Bellini (in Italian). Translated by Rossella Rizzo. Milan: Abscondita. ISBN 9788884166470.
- — (2008). Roger Fry’s Journey: from the Primitives to the Post-Impressionists. Edinburgh: National Galleries of Scotland. ISBN 1906270112.
- — (2019). Roger Fry and Italian Art. London: Ad Ilissum in association with the Burlington Magazine. ISBN 978-1912168088.
- Debenedetti, Ana; — (2019). Botticelli: Past and Present. London: UCL Press.
