= Samuel Hammond (minister) =

Church of England minister

Samuel Hammond D.D. (died 10 December 1665, in Hackney) was a Church of England minister, and later a nonconformist.

== Biography ==
Hammond is said to have been a ‘butcher's son of York’, although the Oxford Dictionary of National Biography notes no butchers of his surname on the lists of freemen of that city.

In 1638 Hammond entered King's College, Cambridge as a sizar. There he was servitor to Dr. Samuel Collins (1576–1651), professor of divinity at Cambridge, and by the Earl of Manchester's interest obtained a fellowship in Magdalene College. He created a great impression in the university by his preaching in St. Giles's Church, and obtained many pupils and followers. Sir Arthur Hesilrigge took him into the north of England as his chaplain, and he settled for some time as minister in Bishopwearmouth, but moved from there to Newcastle. An order of the common council, dated 5 November 1652, appointed him as preacher at St Nicholas's Church, Newcastle, on Sunday and lecturer on Thursday, at a salary of £100.

While at Newcastle Hammond was concerned in the examination and exposure of an impostor named Thomas Ramsay. This man's frauds were exposed in a tract entitled A False Jew: or a Wonderful Discovery of a Scot, baptized at London for a Christian, circumcised at Rome to act a Jew, rebaptized at Hexham for a Believer, but found out at Newcastle to be a Cheat. The dedicatory epistles are signed by Tho. Weld, Sam. Hammond, Cuth. Sidenham, and Wil. Durant. The tract contains a second title-page and pagination, which is the Declaration and Confession published by the impostor under the name of Joseph ben Israel. The Baptist minister of Hexham, Thomas Tillam, supposed himself unfairly treated in this pamphlet, and replied to it by‘Banners of Love displayed …; or an Answer to a Narrative stuffed with Untruths, by four Newcastle Gentlemen. Hammond also helped to write a tract attacking the Quakers, entitled The Perfect Pharise, under Monkish Holines, opposing the Fundamental Principles of the Doctrine of the Gospel, … manifesting himself in the Generation of men called Quakers. Hammond's name comes third among five Newcastle ministers who sign this tract. An introductory epistle ‘to the Reader’ by Hammond appears in a book called God's Judgements upon Drunkards, Swearers, and Sabbath-Breakers.

At the Restoration he was ejected from his charge at Newcastle, and retired to Hamburg as minister to the society of merchants there. Lord-Chancellor Hyde objected to renew the charter of the society of merchants, which was nearly expired, if they retained Hammond, and he was compelled to leave. He went first to Stockholm, where a merchant named Cutler befriended him. The historian Edmund Calamy mentions with praise a letter from Stockholm as having ‘something of the spirit and style of the martyrs,’ though it was apparently never printed. Hammond then proceeded to Danzig, and finally to London, taking up his abode in Hackney.

He died on 10 December 1665.
