= Christopher Lewis (priest) =

British priest and academic

The Very Reverend Christopher Lewis
- Dean of Christ Church
- Church: Church of England
- Diocese: Oxford
- In office: 2003–2014
- Predecessor: John Drury
- Successor: Martyn Percy
- Other post: Dean of St Albans (1994–2003)

Orders
- Ordination: 1973 (deacon); 1974 (priest)

Personal details
- Born: Christopher Andrew Lewis; 4 February 1944 (age 82)
- Denomination: Anglicanism
- Parents: Admiral Sir Andrew Lewis
- Spouse: Rhona Jane Martindale (m. 1970)
- Children: Three
- Education: Marlborough College
- Alma mater: University of Bristol; Corpus Christi College, Cambridge; Westcott House, Cambridge
- Military career
- Branch: Royal Navy
- Service years: 1961–1966
- Rank: Lieutenant
- Conflicts: Indonesia–Malaysia confrontation

Christopher Andrew Lewis (born 4 February 1944) is a Church of England priest and academic. He was Dean of St Albans from 1994 to 2003 and Dean of Christ Church from 2003 to 2014.

== Early life and education ==
Lewis was born on 4 February 1944, to Admiral Sir Andrew Lewis and his wife, Rachel Elizabeth (née Leatham). He was educated at Marlborough College, an all-boys public school in Wiltshire. He went on to study sociology and theology at the University of Bristol, graduating with a Bachelor of Arts (BA) degree in 1969. He later returned to studying, and graduated from Corpus Christi College, Cambridge with a Doctor of Philosophy (PhD) degree in theology in 1974. He trained for ordination at Westcott House, Cambridge.

== Career ==
=== Military service ===
Lewis served in the Royal Navy from 1961 to 1966. He served aboard a minesweeper during the Indonesia–Malaysia confrontation. He was promoted from acting sub-lieutenant to sub-lieutenant on 1 September 1965. He was promoted to lieutenant on 1 March 1966.

On 17 October 1966, Lewis transferred to the Permanent Royal Navy Reserve in the rank of lieutenant. This ended his full-time military service.

=== Ordained ministry ===
Lewis was ordained in the Church of England as a deacon in 1973 and as a priest in 1974. He served as assistant curate of Barnard Castle (1973–76). From 1976 to 1979 he was both Director of the Oxford Institute for Church and Society and a tutor at Ripon College Cuddesdon. He was Senior Tutor at Ripon College Cuddesdon (1979–81) and (Vice Principal) 1981–82. He was also priest-in-charge of Aston Rowant with Crowell from 1978 to 1981. He was Vicar of Spalding from 1982 to 1987 when he was appointed a canon residentiary of Canterbury Cathedral. He was also Director of Ministerial Training for the Diocese of Canterbury from 1989 to 1994.

Lewis was Dean of St Albans Cathedral from 1994 to 2003. He was for some time Chairman of the Association of English Cathedrals. In 2003, he was appointed Dean of Christ Church; this made him both head of Christ Church Cathedral, Oxford and of the associated college of the University of Oxford. He retired on 4 February 2014, his 70th birthday.

== Personal life ==
In 1970, Lewis married Rhona Jane Martindale. They have two sons and one daughter.
