= Eric Heaton =

Eric William Heaton (15 October 1920 – 24 August 1996) was an Old Testament scholar and a former Dean of Christ Church, Oxford (1979–1991).

Eric Heaton's father was a sheep farmer at Long Preston in the West Riding of Yorkshire.

He was educated at Ermysted's Grammar School and Christ's College, Cambridge (1939–1942) and a curate in Durham. He was appointed Chaplain of Gonville and Caius College, Cambridge in 1945. After seven years he was appointed a Canon of Salisbury Cathedral.

He was Fellow, Chaplain, and Tutor in Theology of St John's College, Oxford (1960–1974) and Senior Tutor (1967–1973). He was Dean of Durham Cathedral (1974–1979).

In 1951, he married Rachel Dodd, daughter of the eminent theologian C. H. Dodd whose work on the translation of the New English Bible Heaton much admired.

== Notable works by Heaton ==
- The Book of Daniel - Introduction and Commentary (1956)
- Everyday Life in Old Testament Times (1956)
- The Old Testament Prophets (1958)
- Commentary on the Sunday Lessons — New Lectionary Year One (1959)
- The Hebrew Kingdoms (1968)
- Solomon's New Men: The Emergence of Ancient Israel as a National State (1974)
- School Tradition of the Old Testament (1994)

Church of England titles
| Preceded by John Wild | Dean of Durham Cathedral; 1974–1979 | Succeeded by Peter Baelz |
| Preceded by Henry Chadwick | Dean of Christ Church, Oxford; 1979–1991 | Succeeded by John Drury |
