= Dean of St Albans =

Head of the Chapter of St Albans Cathedral in England

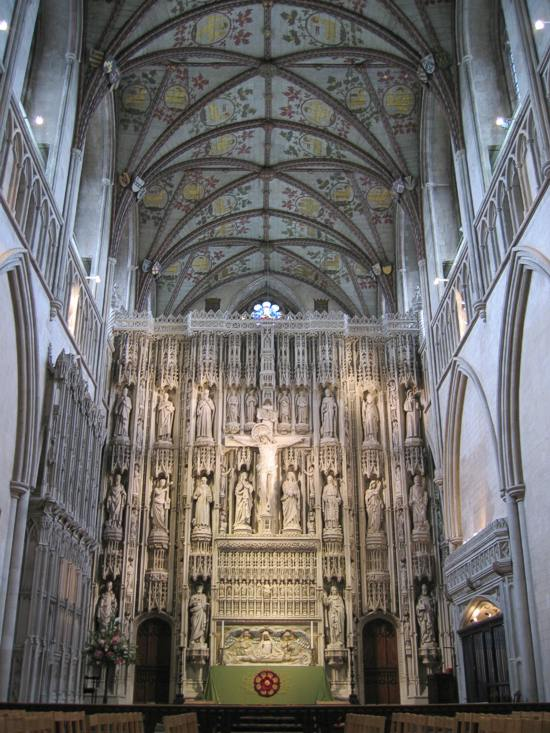
The screen in St Albans Cathedral

The Dean of St Albans is the head of the Chapter of St Albans Cathedral in the city of St Albans, England, in the Diocese of St Albans. As the Dean of St Albans is also the Rector of St Albans, with parochial responsibilities for the largest parish in the Church of England, it is regarded as one of the most senior Deaneries in the United Kingdom.

The Chapter and Dean of St Albans was founded and constituted by Letters patent in February 1900. The first incumbent was Walter Lawrance and the incumbent is Jo Kelly-Moore.

== List of deans ==
- 1900–1914 Walter Lawrance
- 1914–1924 George Blenkin
- 1925–1935 Edward Henderson
- 1936–1955 Cuthbert Thicknesse
- 1955–1963 Kenneth Mathews
- 1964–1973 Noel Kennaby
- 1973–1993 Peter Moore
- 1994–2003 Christopher Lewis
- 2004–2021 Jeffrey John
- 2021–present Jo Kelly-Moore
