= Lee Batson =

British Anglican priest

The Very Reverend Lee Batson
- Dean of Newcastle
- Church: Church of England
- Diocese: Newcastle
- In office: October 2023 – present
- Predecessor: Geoff Miller

Orders
- Ordination: 2004 (deacon); 2005 (priest)

Personal details
- Born: Lee Paul Batson; 1977 (age 48–49) Northolt
- Denomination: Anglicanism
- Education: Royal Holloway; Westcott House, Cambridge; Selwyn College, Cambridge

Lee Paul Batson (born 1977) is a British Anglican priest. Since 2023, he has served as Dean of Newcastle.

== Biography ==
Batson was born in 1977 in Northolt. He was educated at Southend High School for Boys, before studying ancient and medieval history at Royal Holloway, graduating BA in 1999 and MA in 2000. He trained for the ministry at Westcott House, Cambridge, and graduated with a BA in theology from Selwyn College, Cambridge in 2003.

Batson was ordained in the Church of England as a deacon in 2004 and as a priest in 2005. He served as curate in Saffron Walden between 2004 and 2008, and in 2008 became Priest in Charge in Boreham. In 2017, he became Team Rector of the Epping Team Ministry, also serving as Area Dean from 2018, and also as World Church Partnership Officer, developing links between the diocese and the Anglican Church of Kenya. He also served on the diocesan board of education and chaired the Epping Forest Schools Partnership Trust, an academy trust.

After his appointment as Dean of Newcastle was announced on 14 July 2023, he was installed as Dean on 14 October.

Church of England titles
Preceded by Geoff Miller	Dean of Newcastle; 2023 to present	Incumbent
