= Newcastle Cathedral =

Coordinates: 54°58′12″N 1°36′40″W

- Cathedral Church of St Nicholas
- The cathedral at sunset

- Shown within Tyne and Wear
- OS grid reference: NZ 24989 64009
- Location: Newcastle upon Tyne, Tyne and Wear
- Country: England
- Denomination: Church of England
- Previous denomination: Roman Catholic
- Tradition: High Church
- Website: newcastlecathedral.org.uk

Architecture
- Functional status: Active
- Heritage designation: Grade I
- Style: English Gothic
- Years built: 1091 – c. 1500

Specifications
- Capacity: 1,000

Administration
- Province: York
- Diocese: Newcastle

Clergy
- Bishop: Helen-Ann Hartley
- Dean: Lee Batson

Newcastle Cathedral, formally the Cathedral Church of St Nicholas, is a Church of England cathedral in Newcastle upon Tyne, Tyne and Wear, England. It is the seat of the Bishop of Newcastle and is the mother church of the Diocese of Newcastle.

It is the most northerly diocese of the Anglican Church in England, reaching from the River Tyne as far north as Berwick-upon-Tweed and as far west as Alston in Cumbria. The cathedral is a grade I listed building.

Founded in 1091 during the same period as the nearby castle, the Norman church was destroyed by fire in 1216 and the current building was completed in 1350, so is mostly of the Perpendicular style of the 14th century. Its tower is noted for its 15th-century lantern spire. Heavily restored in 1777, the building was raised to cathedral status in 1882, when it became known as the Cathedral Church of St Nicholas.

== History ==
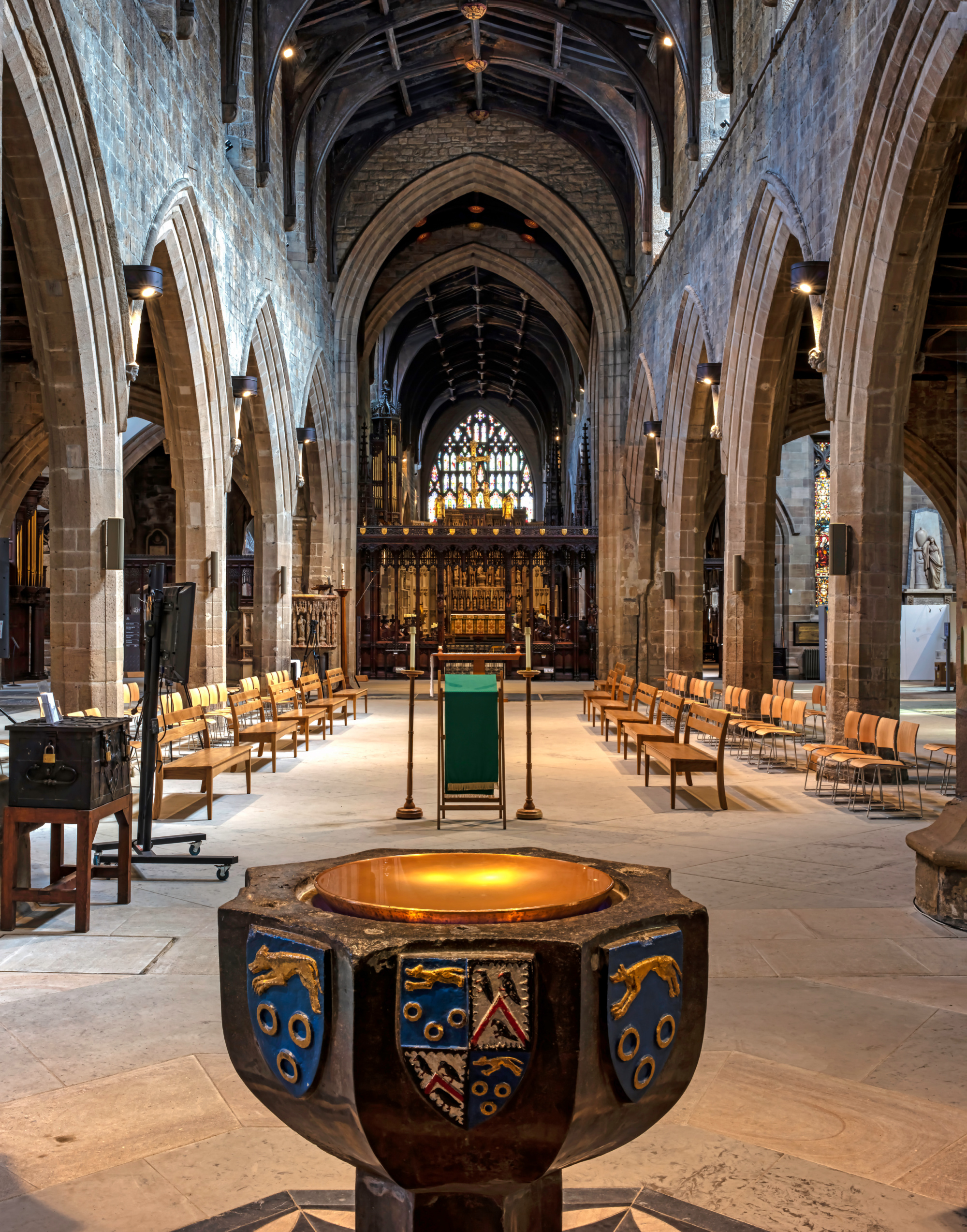
Looking down the nave, remodelled in 2020/21, towards the East Window.

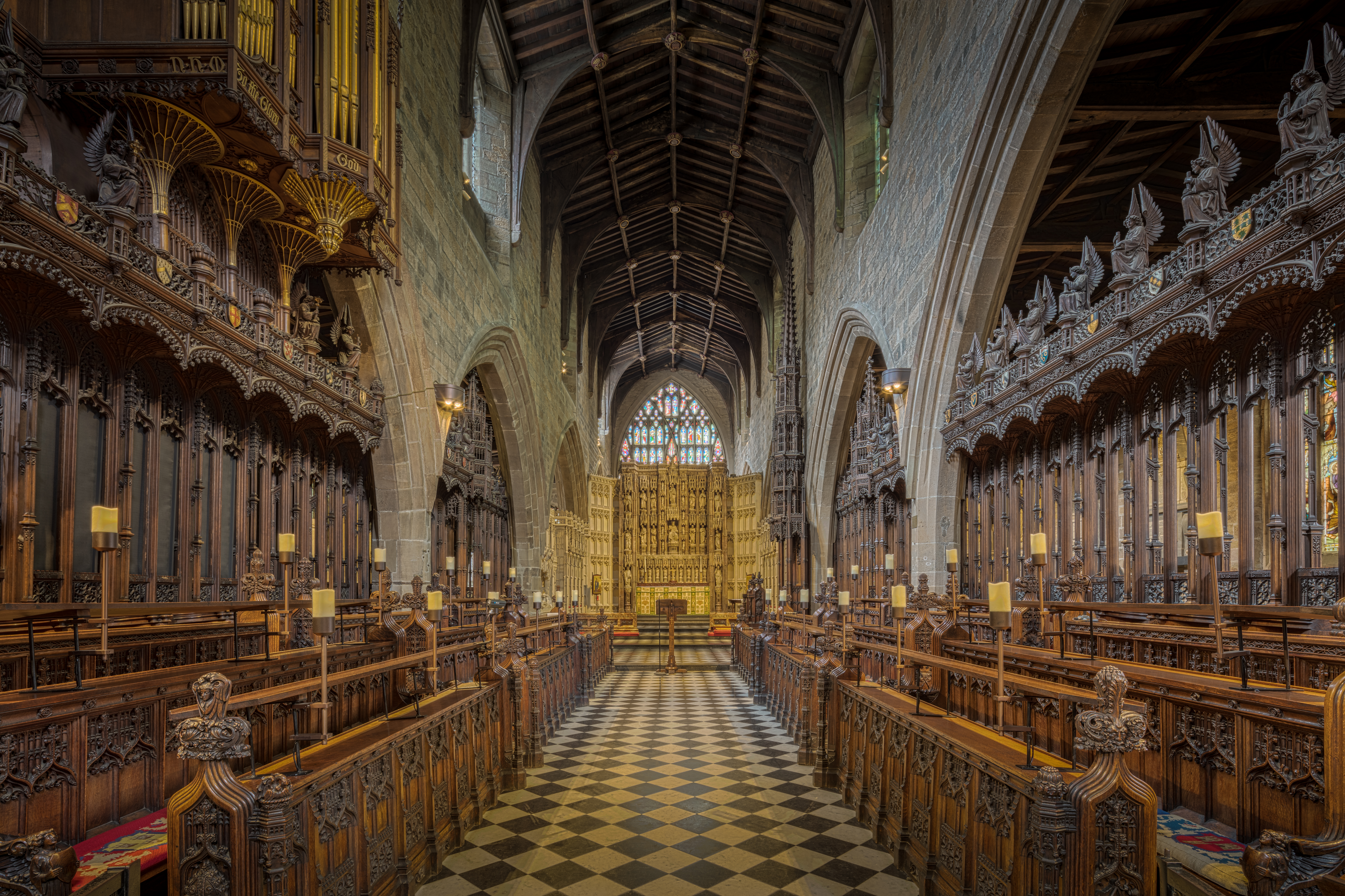
The choir

The cathedral is named after Saint Nicholas, the patron saint of sailors and boats. This may reflect the cathedral's position on the northern heights above the River Tyne. It was originally a parish church, built in 1091. It was built close to the line of Hadrian's Wall through Newcastle, which may have passed through or near the churchyard to the south, but unfortunately the exact location of its line through the very centre of the city is currently lost. Close to the south of the cathedral is Newcastle Castle, which gave the city its name, and which was itself built on the site of the Hadrian's Wall fort of Pons Aelius. The Norman church was destroyed by fire in 1216 and the present structure was completed in 1350.

The most famous notable of the cathedral was the Scottish reformer John Knox, who served as minister from late 1550 until 2 February 1553.

In the mid-19th century Newcastle experienced a huge increase in its population, leading to the construction of over 20 new churches in the suburbs. As Newcastle continued to grow, so did its need for a diocese separate from Durham, and so in 1882 the Diocese of Newcastle was formed, with St Nicholas's as its cathedral.

The cathedral is notable for its unusual lantern spire, which was constructed in 1448. For hundreds of years, it was a main navigation point for ships using the River Tyne. At its base the tower measures 36 ft 9 in (11.20 m) by 35 ft (11 m) and it is 194 ft 2 in (59.18 m) from the base to the top of the steeple.

On each corner of the lantern are gilded statues, of Adam eating the apple, Eve holding out the apple, Aaron dressed as a bishop, and David holding a harp. Following work on the street in the 1860s the tower was found to be cracking and tilting, so two porches were added to buttress the structure. Since then the tower has settled and the ornate wooden font cover, which is suspended from the tower inside, does not hang in line with the font.

The interior of the church was badly damaged by Scottish invaders during their brief occupation of the city in 1640, and in 1644, during the nine-week Siege of Newcastle, Scottish invaders threatened to bombard the lantern tower, but were deterred when the mayor Sir John Marley put his Scottish prisoners in it. The tower was repaired in September 1645, 1723 and 1761. A lightning conductor was added in 1777.

In 2020 and 2021, the cathedral closed to visitors on account of the COVID-19 pandemic lockdown. However, the building work of the Common Ground in Sacred Space heritage project continued. The renovation works entailed removing the Victorian pews, installing underfloor heating, restoring and re-laying up to 130 ledger stones (gravestones), improving the churchyards, and adding an east entrance to the building. The cathedral re-opened in August 2021.

In October 2021, the building was one of 142 sites across England to receive part of a £35-million injection into the government's Culture Recovery Fund.

== Bells ==
The tower contains a ring of fourteen bells, the tenor bell which weighs almost two tons, plus one 14th and two 15th-century bells, the oldest of which, "Michael", is rung for daily services. The addition of a second treble bell (named "Gabriel") in 1999 has made it possible to ring a lighter peal of ten bells. In addition to these bells is a bourdon ('The Major') which weighs nearly six tonnes and is hung for swing chiming.

== Notable interior features ==
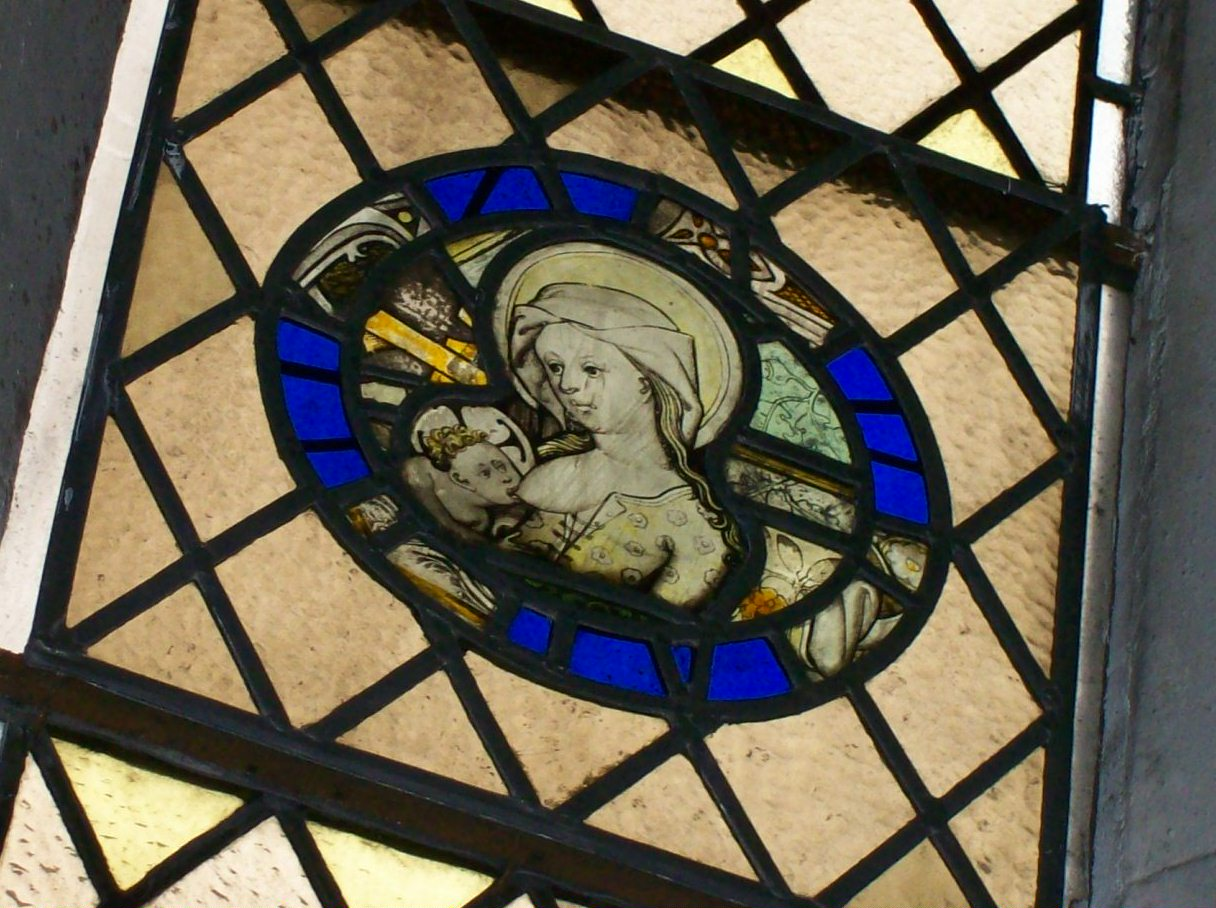
Medieval Madonna and Child roundel in St Margaret's Chapel

The nave furnishings were designed by the local artist and craftsman Ralph Hedley in the early 20th century, after the parish church of St Nicholas became a cathedral in 1882. The high altar depicts Christ in Majesty holding an orb and sceptre, flanked by the Four Evangelists each with their special symbol.

Inside the cathedral a finely carved marble monument commemorates Admiral Lord Collingwood (1748–1810), born just to the south of the cathedral in a house in The Side, who took over command at the Battle of Trafalgar (21 October 1805) after the death of Admiral Lord Nelson. Collingwood was baptised and married in St Nicholas's and each year, on 21 October, a wreath is laid in his memory in front of the monument. His body was buried in St Paul's Cathedral in London, near to that of Nelson.

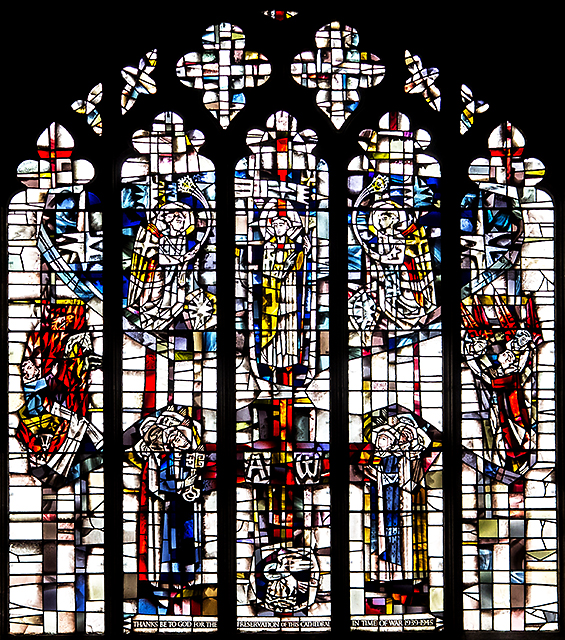
Ascension window by Leonard Evetts

The cathedral is filled with beautiful stained glass. Much of the original glass was broken during the Civil War and most now dates from the 18th century onwards. St Margaret's Chapel contains the only known fragment of medieval stained glass in the cathedral, a beautiful roundel of the Madonna feeding the Christ Child. More-modern stained glass works such as in St. George's Chapel were erected in honour of two of Tyneside's late 19th-/early 20th-century industrial pioneers, who both died in 1931 within weeks of each other. Other references to industry can be found in the cathedral's stained glass, including in the Charles Parsons window, which features Turbinia, the first turbine-driven steam yacht, with which Parsons astonished the Queen's Navy at the Spithead naval review in 1897. The five-light east window in the Chapel of the Ascension is by Leonard Evetts and was installed in 1963 in thanksgiving for the cathedral's survival during the Second World War.

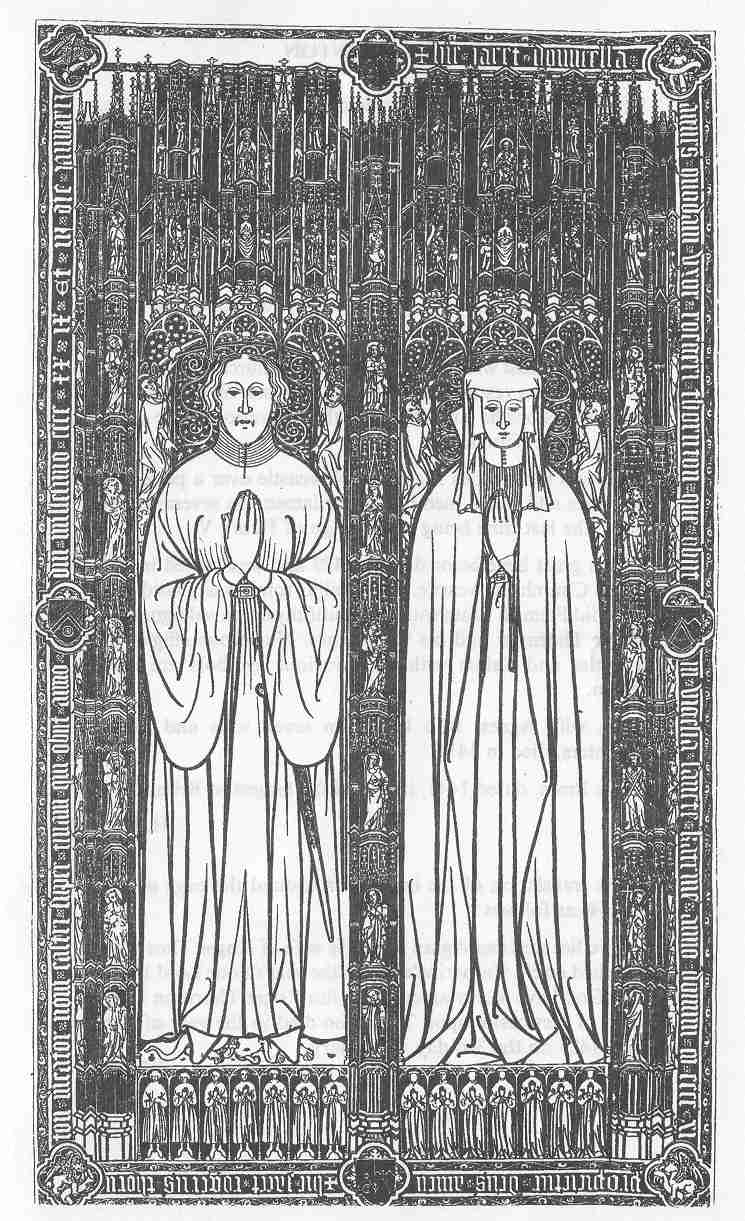
Monumental brass of Roger and Agnes Thornton and their fourteen children. It was originally in All Saints' Church nearby.

The cathedral contains a number of memorials, the oldest being a 13th-century tomb effigy of a knight in armour, thought to be Peter le Marechal, sword-bearer to King Edward I. It is one of the oldest objects in the cathedral. Another is the Thornton Brass, a monumental brass to Roger Thornton and his wife; he was a successful merchant, three times Mayor of Newcastle, several times Member of Parliament, and great benefactor to the cathedral. This is one of the finest examples of a Flemish brass and dates from at least as early as 1441 (maybe pre-1429); it is believed to be the largest brass in the United Kingdom, and originally it covered Thornton's tomb in the nearby All Saints' Church, Newcastle upon Tyne. This commemoration to Thornton, his wife, seven sons and seven daughters can now be seen fixed vertically on the far side of the High Altar of Newcastle Cathedral, facing the east window. A horizontal replica was previously kept near the north door of the cathedral for brass rubbing purposes.

Just to the north of the cathedral stands a bronze statue of Queen Victoria erected to commemorate 500 years of the Shrievalty (the jurisdiction of a sheriff) of Newcastle. Sculpted by Alfred Gilbert and unveiled in 1903, two years after Queen Victoria's death, the statue was a gift from W. H. Stephenson, a company director and politician who held the office of mayor in Newcastle seven times.

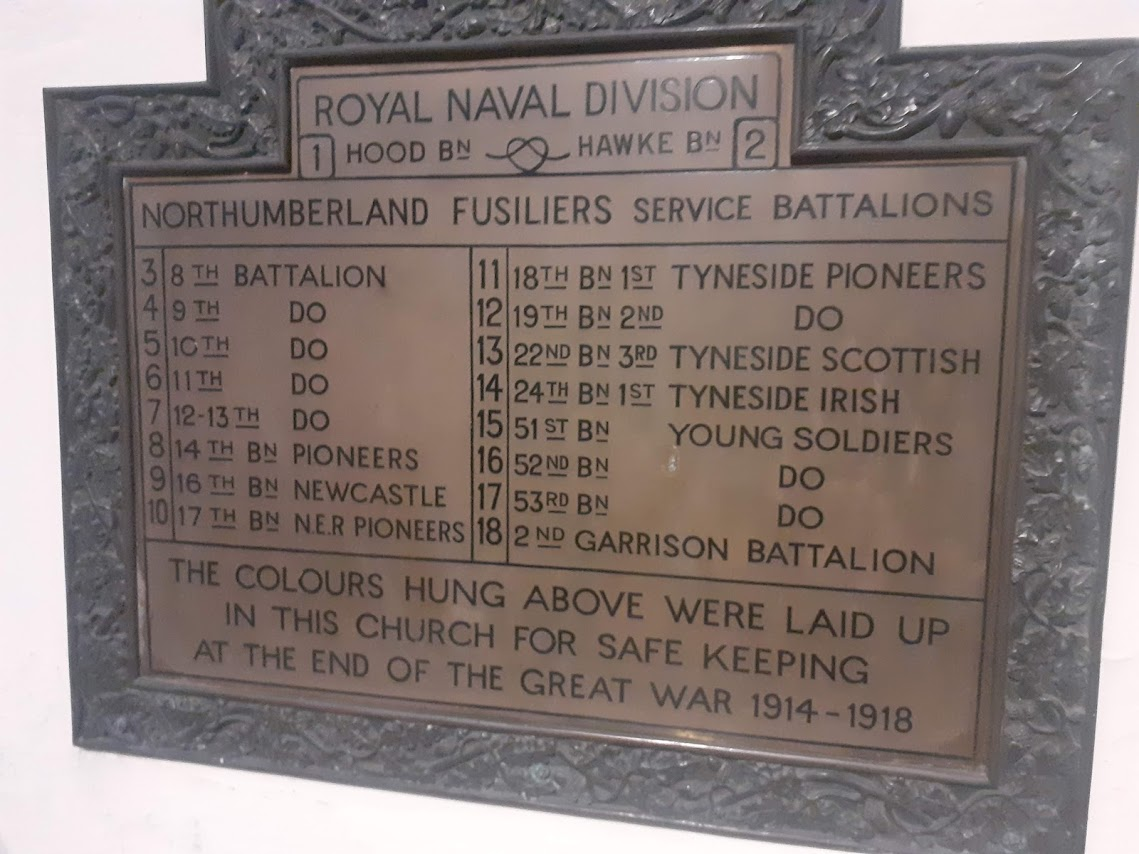
A plaque listing the colours hung in Newcastle Cathedral.

The cathedral is home to a number of standards presented to the cathedral for safe keeping at the end of the First World War; they are displayed in the Chapel of the Northumberland Fusiliers. These include two belonging to the Royal Naval Division (Hood Battalion and Hawke Battalion), and 16 belonging to battalions of the Northumberland Fusiliers (8th, 9th, 10th, 11th 12th & 13th, 14th, 16th (Newcastle Commercials), 17th (North Eastern Railway Pioneers), 18th (1st Tyneside Pioneers), 19th (2nd Tyneside Pioneers), 22nd (3rd Tyneside Scottish), 24th (1st Tyneside Irish), 51st, 52nd, 53rd and 2nd Garrison).

== Dean and chapter ==
Arms used by the cathedral chapter.

As from 14 September 2024:

- Dean – The Very Reverend Lee Batson
- Canon for Worship & Congregational Life – The Revd Canon Ruth Hulse
- Canon for Mission – The Revd Canon Zoe Heming
- Archdeacon of Northumberland – The Venerable Rachel Wood

== Music ==
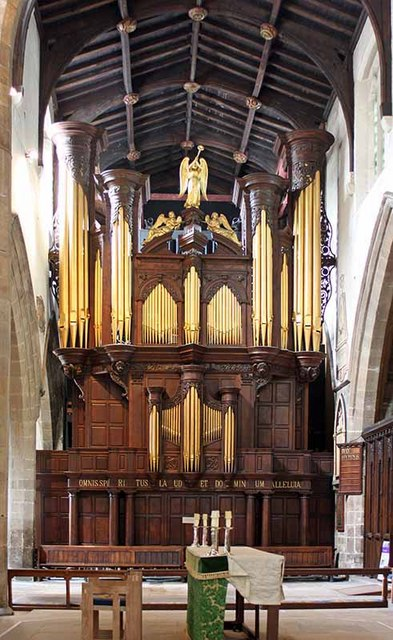
The Lewis & Co/ Harrison & Harrison/ Nicholson & Co organ at Newcastle Cathedral.

The cathedral has a strong tradition of music. In 1503, the thirteen-year-old Princess Margaret, daughter of Henry VII and engaged to marry James IV of Scotland, while passing through Newcastle on her way north, noted in her journal a number of children in surplices "who sang melodious hymns, accompanying themselves with instruments of many sorts". Later, the baroque composer Charles Avison (1709–1770) was organist and choirmaster at the church.

The cathedral choir has been featured on BBC Radio 3's Choral Evensong.

The cathedral is home to a fine organ, a four-manual Grand Organ built by T C Lewis, although rebuilt several times since, notably by Harrison & Harrison in 1911 and 1954 and by Nicholson & Co. of Worcester in 1981.

== See also ==
- Samuel Hammond
