= Will Adam =

Anglican archdeacon

The Venerable Will Adam
- Archdeacon of Canterbury
- Church: Church of England
- Province: Canterbury
- Diocese: Canterbury
- In office: 18 July 2022 – present
- Predecessor: Jo Kelly-Moore

Orders
- Ordination: 1994 (deacon); 1995 (priest)

Personal details
- Born: William Jonathan Adam; October 28, 1969 (age 57)
- Denomination: Church of England
- Spouse: Lindsay Yates
- Children: 3
- Education: Aylesbury Grammar School; University of Manchester

William Jonathan Adam FSA FRHistS (born 28 October 1969) is a Church of England priest. He was appointed Archdeacon of Canterbury in 2022 and had previously been the deputy secretary general of the Anglican Communion and ecumenical advisor to the Archbishop of Canterbury.

== Education and family ==
Will Adam was born in October 1969 and has two younger sisters. He was educated at Aylesbury Grammar School and studied theology and English church history at Manchester University. He then attended Westcott House, Cambridge, from where he was sent to the Bossey Ecumenical Institute in Switzerland for six months in 1993. Adam later went on to earn a master's degree and a doctorate in canon law at Cardiff Law School. He was elected as a Fellow of the Royal Historical Society (FRHistS) in 2011 and as a Fellow of the Society of Antiquaries of London (FSA) in 2024. His wife, Lindsay Yates, is also an Anglican priest (and the current Canon Precentor for Canterbury Cathedral) and they have three daughters.

== Career ==
Adam was ordained deacon in 1994 and priest in 1995 and served in parishes in the dioceses of Oxford (1994–2002), Ely (2002–2010), and London (2010–2017). While still a curate in 1996, he appeared in a television advertisement for Ford Escort cars, in which the caption stated, "Will Adam has married 14 women since he got his. What do you do in yours?", showing him adjusting his clerical collar. In 1998, he was a youth delegate to the World Council of Churches Assembly in Harare, Zimbabwe.

In 2017, Adam was appointed the Archbishop of Canterbury's Ecumenical Adviser at Lambeth Palace, while also holding the role of honorary assistant priest in his wife's parish at Compton, West Sussex. In 2019, he was also made director of the Department for Unity, Faith and Order in the Anglican Communion. In this role he was responsible for and co-secretary of dialogues between the Anglican Communion and other churches and Christian world communions, including those with the Catholic Church (Anglican - Roman Catholic International Commission and IARCCUM), the Orthodox Church (ICAOTD) and a new dialogue with the Pentecostal World Fellowship. In February 2021 he was appointed deputy secretary general of the Anglican Communion, based at the Anglican Communion Office (ACO) adjacent to Portobello Road Market.

In March 2022, it was announced that Adam would be the next Archdeacon of Canterbury and a residentiary canon of Canterbury Cathedral, following the departure of the previous incumbent, the Very Reverend Jo Kelly-Moore, who was made Dean of St Albans. He was installed at Canterbury during Evensong on 18 July 2022, but seconded back to the ACO for the Fifteenth Lambeth Conference between 27 July and 7 August 2022. In 2025, he chaired the Diocese of Canterbury’s Vacancy in See Committee as part of the process for the appointment of the 106th Archbishop of Canterbury.

== Bibliography ==
- Will Adam, Legal flexibility and the mission of the Church: dispensation and economy in ecclesiastical law Farnham, Surrey, 2011. ISBN 978-1-4094-2055-2
- Lindsay Yates and Will Adam, Canon law and the newly ordained, (third edition, 2011), Ministry Division of the Church of England, Church House Publishing, London.
