= Jo Kelly-Moore =

Anglican dean

The Very Reverend Jo Kelly-Moore
- Dean of St Albans
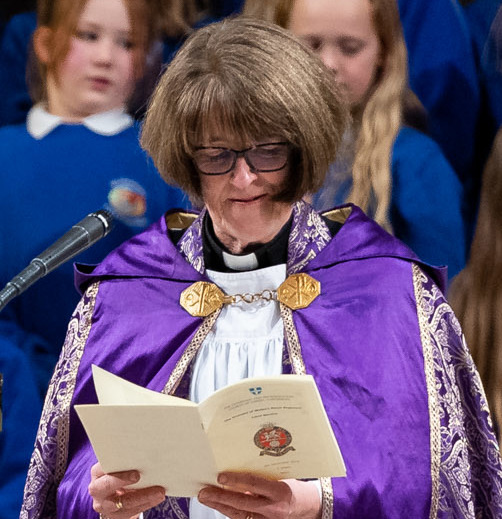
- Kelly-Moore in 2019
- Diocese: Diocese of St Albans
- In office: 4 December 2021 – present
- Predecessor: Jeffrey John
- Other posts: Dean of Auckland & Deputy Vicar-General (2010–2017); Archdeacon of Canterbury & Canon Residentiary, Canterbury Cathedral (2017–2021)

Orders
- Ordination: 2000 (deacon); 2001 (priest)

Personal details
- Born: 1968 (age 57–58) New Zealand
- Denomination: Anglican
- Spouse: Paul
- Children: 2
- Profession: Priest, solicitor (former)
- Education: Victoria University of Wellington

Joanne Kelly-Moore (born 1968) is a New Zealand Anglican priest who has been the Dean of St Albans since 2021. She was previously the Dean of Auckland in the Anglican Church of New Zealand from 2010 to 2017, and then Archdeacon of Canterbury in the Church of England.

== Early life, education and family ==
She was born in Wellington in 1968. She was educated at Victoria University of Wellington, graduating with Bachelor of Arts (BA) and Bachelor of Laws (LLB) degrees. She is married to Paul and they have two children. Before training for the ministry, Kelly-Moore practised as a solicitor in New Zealand and in London.

== Ministry career ==
After leaving her legal career, Kelly-Moore studied theology at the Bible College of New Zealand, graduating with a Bachelor of Divinity (BD) degree in 1999. She then undertook further training for ordained ministry at St John's College, Auckland, the theological college of the Anglican Church in Aotearoa, New Zealand and Polynesia. She was made deacon in 2000 and ordained priest in 2001. She served first as assistant curate at St Aidan's Remuera until 2004, when she became its vicar; in Remuera she was additionally chaplain to Corran School for Girls. In August 2010, she was installed as Dean of Auckland (lead priest at Holy Trinity Cathedral, Auckland, the mother church of the Anglican Diocese of Auckland). During her time as dean, she oversaw the completion of the cathedral church building and was also deputy vicar-general of the diocese. She served on the general synod of the Anglican Church in Aotearoa, New Zealand and Polynesia and on that synod's standing committee.

On 11 September 2016, it was announced that Kelly-Moore was to become Archdeacon of Canterbury (and a canon residentiary of Canterbury Cathedral, the worldwide mother church of Anglicanism), in the United Kingdom. She was collated on 22 January 2017, becoming also a canon of the cathedral. The cathedral uses "vice dean" not of one particular appointee, but to refer to the canon in residence for each month.

On 6 September 2021, it was announced that Kelly-Moore was to become Dean of St Albans, the clerk primus inter pares at St Albans Cathedral, late in 2021. She was installed on 4 December 2021.

She is chair of the Executive Board of the Association of English Cathedrals.
